= Lynwood Senior High School =

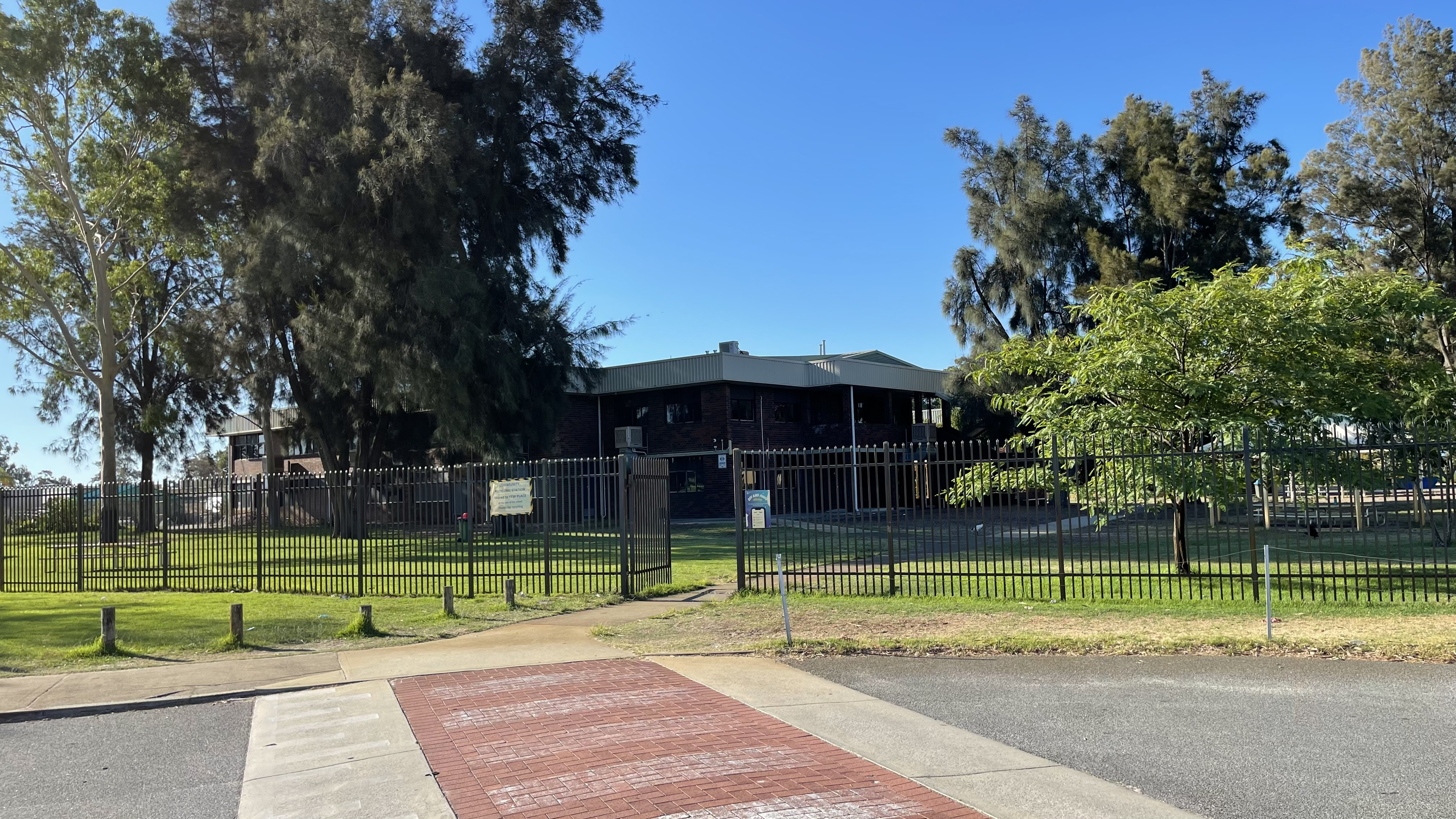
- Car park entry

Location
- 436 Metcalfe Rd; Parkwood, Perth, Western Australia 6147; Australia; 32°02′29″S 115°55′02″E

Information
- Type: Independent public co-educational specialist high day school
- Motto: Learners Today, Leaders Tomorrow
- Established: 1974; 52 years ago
- Educational authority: WA Department of Education
- Specialists: Football (soccer); Vocational education; Sustainability; Intensive English Centre
- Principal: Emma Walker
- Years: 7–12
- Enrolment: 1,136 (6 June 2022)
- Campus type: Suburban
- Colours: Blue and yellow
- Website: www.lynwood.wa.edu.au

Lynwood Senior High School is an independent public co-educational specialist high day school in the City of Canning, located in the Perth suburb of Parkwood, Western Australia.

Established in 1974, the school caters for students from Year 7 to Year 12. The school specialises in sustainability education and a specialist soccer program. As well as preparing students for university, the school includes a comprehensive vocational education and training pathway for students in years 11 and 12.

== History ==
The school began in 1974 as eight demountable classrooms on the grounds of Cannington Senior High School. In January 1975, the school, comprising years 8 and 9, moved to the newly constructed campus at Parkwood. Bill Goulding was the first principal, who, with deputy principals Meredith Crossing and Peter Clark, instituted "Sincerity" as the school motto and the swan as the emblem for the school crest. Mauve was the colour of the first school uniform, later regarded humorously by school commentators as garish 1970s fashion.

In the beginning, many of the students were from families who immigrated from the United Kingdom. Student numbers were low. Students and teachers bonded into a close knit community. Hotly contested hockey and cricket matches were held often between students and teachers. In September 1988 during the Australian Bicentenary, a time capsule was constructed by Design and Technology teacher Frank Murphy and his Vocational Education students. Records of student work, music, and photographs were stored in the capsule. The time capsule was buried in front of the canteen and it will be opened in September 2038. During the 1990s, Lynwood became multicultural with students from families who emigrated from Asia, the Middle East and Africa. In 2018, Lynwood was awarded WA Secondary School of the Year.

== Catchment area and enrolments ==
The school catchment area, specified by the WA Department of Education in 2018, included the suburbs of Ferndale, Lynwood, Parkwood, and small parts of Langford and Riverton. The feeder primary schools, specified by the WA Department of Education in 2005, included Bannister Creek, Brookman, and Parkwood.

In 2018, Neighbouring high schools included Willetton Senior High School to the west, Canning Vale College to the south, Thornlie Senior High School to the east, and Sevenoaks Senior College to the north. The Canning River demarcates the northern catchment border.

Between 2007 and 2011, enrolments declined from 1,032 to 900. The fall in student numbers from 2010 was due to the change in enrolment age for students entering high school in Western Australia.

== Specialist programs ==
Lynwood offers specialist education in sustainability. Currently, Environment and Life Sciences (EaLs) education at the school is the only recognised sustainability curriculum course approved in Western Australia. Statewide, students may apply for, and attend, the specialist course from years 7 to 10. The course is enriched by strong partnerships with a range of universities, government and community organisations, and it is pioneering high school sustainability education in Western Australia.

The school offers a specialised football (soccer) program as part of the Lynwood Specialised Soccer Academy. In 2004, the program was endorsed as part of the Gifted and Talented Education (GATE) by the WA Department of Education. During the 5-year program, opportunities arise for coaching, refereeing and organising events. The program also streams into upper school WACE units and VET courses specific to football for university or TAFE placements.

As well, the school hosts an Intensive English Centre (IEC) for newly arrived migrant students, between the ages of 12–16 years from various cultural backgrounds, to learn English as an additional language.

== Eals Program ==
Lynwood Senior High School specialises in a special program called Eals. Eals stands for environment and life sciences. The program helps students learn sustainability and about the environment.

== Academic ranking ==
WA school ATAR ranking
Year	Rank	Median ATAR	Eligible students	Students with ATAR	% students with ATAR
2020	96	74.35	228	48	21.05
2019	39	82.20	277	31	11.12
2018	61	80.55	229	29	12.66
2017	28	85.70	225	41	18.22
2016	83	75.60	255	52	20.39

In 1986, Sherwant Singh Gill won the Beazley Medal for the top ranked academic student in Western Australia.

== Notable alumni ==
- Sharron Booth – writer, The Silence of Water (2022)
- Trevor Cochrane – creative director, executive producer and presenter, best known as the presenter of Garden Gurus
- Jacob Collard – former A-League soccer player
- Tyler Garner – Australian futsal player
- Jarryd Goundrey – content creator and comedian
- Tareq Kamleh – medical doctor and member of outlawed Islamic State
- Tobias Muhafidin – musician and actor
- John Sherrit – drummer, The Kind and Close Action, Innocent Bystanders, Johnny Diesel and the Injectors, Diesel, Jimmy Barnes, Richard Clapton
- Kai Qi (Bernice) Teoh – Australian badminton player
- Kai Chen Teoh – Australian badminton player
- Devon Terrell – actor

== See also ==
- List of schools in the Perth metropolitan area
