= Girrawheen Senior High School =

Location
- 39 Calvert Way; Girrawheen, Western Australia; Australia; 31°50′13″S 115°50′31″E

Information
- Type: Independent public co-educational day school
- Opened: 1974; 52 years ago
- Educational authority: WA Department of Education
- Principal: Barbara Newton
- Years: 7–12
- Enrolment: 442 (2021)
- Campus type: Suburban
- Colour
- Website: www.girrawheenshs.wa.edu.au

Girrawheen Senior High School is an independent public co-educational high day school, located in the Perth suburb of Girrawheen, Western Australia.

== Overview ==
Girrawheen Senior High School opened in 1974.

In 2008, Girrawheen Senior High School was selected as one of six schools in Western Australia to receive a trade training centre. The facility was constructed at a cost of A$2.98 million, and opened in 2010. Students from Balga Senior High School also use the facility.

In 2014, Girrawheen Senior High School was selected as a site for a Clontarf Academy. The Clontarf Academy uses Australian rules football to improve the education, employment prospects and life skills of Aboriginal boys.

Girrawheen Senior High School became an Independent Public School at the start of 2013. In 2015, the school started accepting year 7 students for the first time, alongside most other public high schools in the state.

In 2021, Girrawheen Senior High School teacher, Charan Pabla, was named as WA Premier’s Secondary Teacher of the Year in the WA Education Awards.

In 2022, Girrawheen Senior High School was named as the winner of the WA Education Awards for Excellence in Teaching and Learning.

In 2025, Girrawheen Senior High School has been selected as one of four schools in Western Australia to participate in the Connected Community School trial as part of the $21 million initiative by the State and Federal Government.

== Academic results ==
Girrawheen Senior High School consistently performs above like-schools in ATAR results. In 2016, the school had a median ATAR of 76.8 from 12 students, whereas like-schools had a median ATAR of 60.7. In 2017, the school had a median ATAR of 73.2 from 16 students, whereas like-schools had a median ATAR of 64.1. In 2018, the school had a median ATAR of 72.0 from 12 students, whereas like-schools had a median ATAR of 56.4.

== Local intake area ==
Girrawheen Senior High School's local intake area covers parts of Alexander Heights, parts of Balga, Mirrabooka, Girrawheen, parts of Koondoola and Marangaroo. Students living in the local intake area have a guaranteed place at the school if they apply. Students living outside the local intake area can apply, and they will be accepted on a case-by-case basis.

== Student numbers ==
Girrawheen Senior High School has a high proportion of Aboriginal students, at 21% as of 2019, as well as a high proportion of students with a language background other than English, at above 35% as of 2019.

| Year | Number |
|---|---|
| 2012 | 457 |
| 2013 | 413 |
| 2014 | 424 |
| 2015 | 490 |
| 2016 | 483 |
| 2017 | 457 |
| 2018 | 433 |
| 2019 | 421 |
| 2020 | 436 |
| 2021 | 444 |
| 2022 | 446 |
| 2023 | 438 |
| 2024 | 469 |

== Notable alumni ==
- Tammy MacIntosh – Actress
- Damien Martyn – Cricket commentator and former cricketer
- Duop Reath – Basketballer

== See also ==
- List of schools in the Perth metropolitan area
