= Belmont City College =

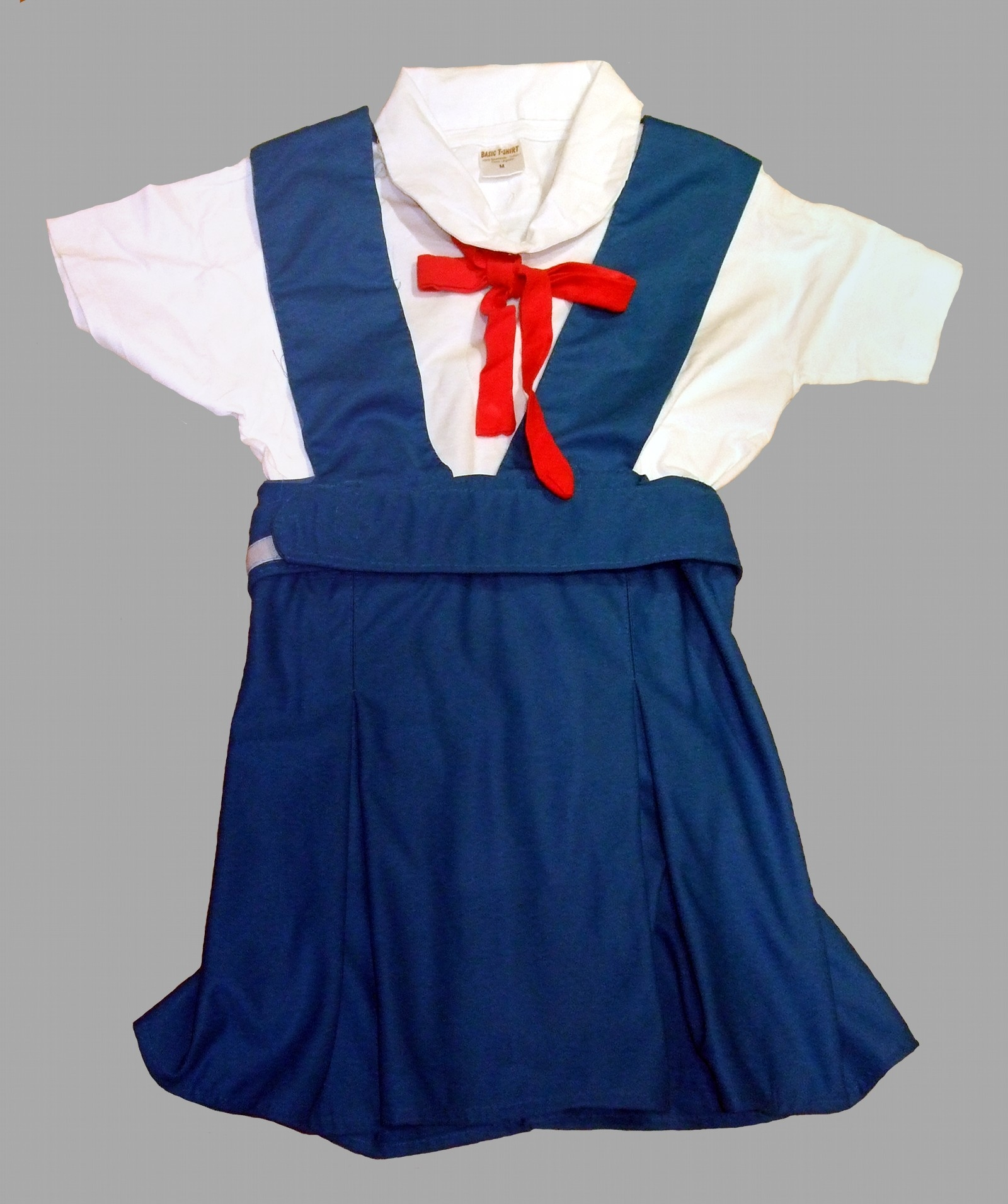

Location
- 106 Fisher Street, Belmont, Western Australia; Australia; 31°57′33″S 115°56′04″E

Information
- Former name: Belmont Senior High School
- Type: Public co-educational high school
- Motto: Bold, Creative, Caring
- Established: 1957; 69 years ago
- Educational authority: WA Department of Education
- Principal: Darrel Le Mercier
- Years: 7–12
- Enrolment: 967 (2026)
- Campus type: Suburban
- Colours: Navy blue and yellow
- Website: www.belmontcc.wa.edu.au

Belmont City College (BCC) is a comprehensive independent public co-educational high school, located in Belmont, 6 kilometres (4 mi) east of Perth, Western Australia (WA). Opening in 1957, the school's catchment area covers most of the City of Belmont and the eastern part of the Town of Victoria Park. As of Semester 1, 2026 the college had an enrolment of 967 students between Year 7 and Year 12. In Semester 1, 2011, 69 students enrolled were Indigenous Australians.

From 1957 until 2000, the college was known as Belmont Senior High School.

== Catchment area ==
Belmont's catchment area has been specified by the WA Department of Education to include the suburbs of Ascot, Cloverdale, Kewdale, Redcliffe and Rivervale. Students in Carlisle and Lathlain have the choice between Belmont City College and Kent Street Senior High School. Belmont's feeder primary schools are Belmay, Belmont, Cloverdale, Redcliffe and Tranby.

Its neighbour high schools are Kent Street Senior High School to the southwest, Cannington Community College to the south and Governor Stirling Senior High School to the northeast.

== History ==
The school opened in 1957. Its catchment area grew substantially after the Court government's closure of Kewdale Senior High School in 1999, (Note: In 2000, Australian Islamic College reopened a school on the site of the former Kewdale Senior High School as their Kewdale campus.) but between 2000 and 2005, there was a decline in the percentage of students enrolling from the feeder primary schools, with the school population shrinking from 790 to 520 in this period. During this period, there were also a number of violent incidents at the school which attracted negative media attention.

From 2005 to 2006 onwards, the school instituted a number of reforms focusing on improving the school culture and the efficiency of administration. These included the school-wide implementation of the "Choose Respect" initiative to address bullying, which won a regional award for excellence in 2007 and saw Belmont teachers presenting at Safe Schools events in other states, and a restorative justice initiative for peaceful conflict resolution. The school also formed a special agreement with the University of Western Australia during this period for its academic students, and with the City of Belmont for its vocational students.

In 2010 the college became one of the first 34 schools in WA to become part of the state government's Department of Education internal Independent Public Schools scheme. The system retained direct accountability to the Director General of Education while allowing the school to have some control over its resources.

== Special programs ==
- BCC Hospitality Specialist Program
- Music and Arts, including a school band and concerts.
- Structured Workplace Learning
- A+ Academic Extension Program
- Follow the Dream – Tertiary Aspirations Program
- Aboriginal school-based traineeships
- Breakfast Club

Students can be in all or none of these programs when attending BCC.

== See also ==
- List of schools in the Perth metropolitan area

== Sources ==
- Hunter, Lindsay; Morling, Loreley A. (2016). Town of Victoria Park Local History Collection Timeline (3rd ed.). Town of Victoria Park Library.
