= Hampton Senior High School =

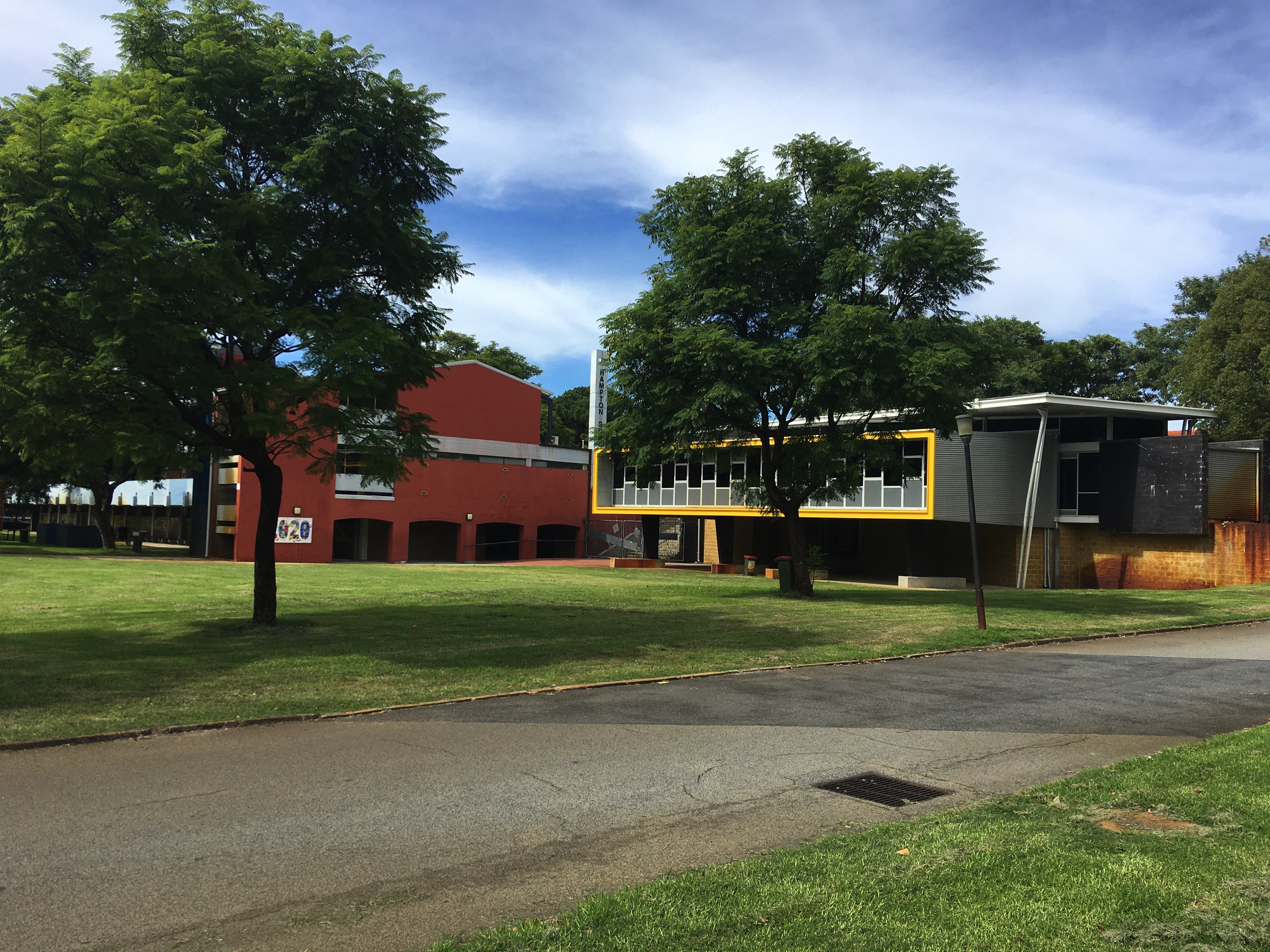

Location
- 60 Morley Drive East; Morley, Western Australia; Australia; 31°53′28″S 115°55′37″E

Information
- Type: Independent public co-educational day school
- Motto: Latin: Labor omnia vincit (Hard work conquers all)
- Opened: 1966; 60 years ago
- Educational authority: WA Department of Education
- Specialist: Cheer Dance; Information & Communication Technology; Performing Arts; Gifted & Talented dance; STEM; Athletics Academy
- Principal: Tracy Griffiths
- Years: 7–12
- Enrolment: 821 (2022)
- Campus type: Suburban
- Colours: Red & Gold
- Website: www.hampton.wa.edu.au

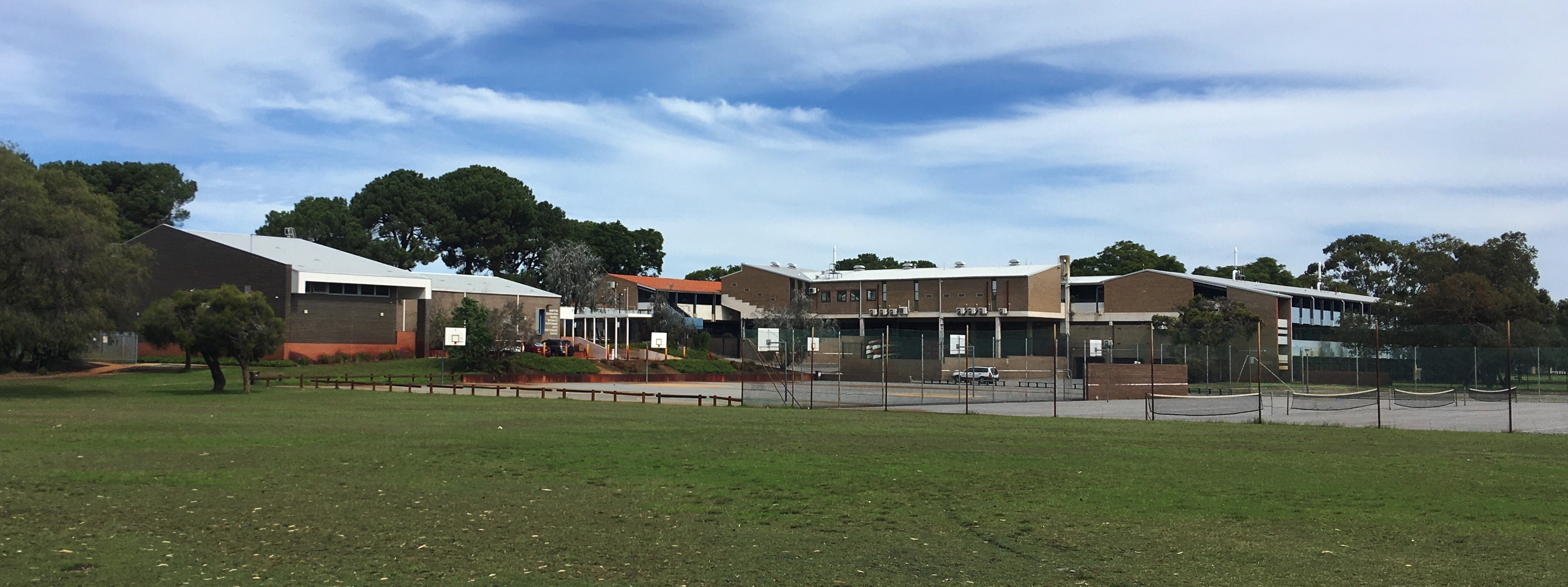
Hampton Senior High School longshot

Hampton Senior High School is an Independent public co-educational high day school, located in the Perth suburb of Morley, Western Australia.

== History ==
In August 1965, the Department of Education announced that a school would open in Hampton in 1966 to reduce overcrowding at Governor Stirling, Cyril Jackson and John Forrest Senior High Schools. Hampton Senior High School opened in February 1966, but the school had not been completed yet. Two classrooms at Middle Swan Primary School and five at Midland Technical School were used by the school for the first term of 1966. Students were transported by bus to other facilities to do home economics and design and technology.

In term two, the school's buildings were complete and so the school moved in.

The school is named after John Hampton, the Governor of Western Australia from 1862 to 1868.

In 1986, the school first started its dance program. In 1991, the school held its 25th year reunion. An aerial photo was taken of all the staff and students on the oval.

Hampton Senior High School became an Independent Public School in 2015.

== Programs ==
Hampton Senior High Schools has Department of Education endorsed specialist programs in cheer dance, information and communication technology (ICT) and performing arts. Hampton Senior High School is also one of only two schools offering a Gifted and Talented Dance program in Western Australia.

== Local intake area ==
Hampton Senior High School's local intake area covers parts of Bassendean, Bayswater, Eden Hill, Embleton, Kiara, Morley and Noranda. Students living in the local intake area have a guaranteed place at the school if they apply. Students applying from outside the local intake area will be accepted on a case-by-case basis.

== Academic results ==
Year	Rank	Median ATAR	Eligible students	Students with ATAR	% Students with ATAR	Ref
2021	—N/a	59.25	86	29	33.72%	
2020	117	67.15	93	24	25.81%	
2019	136	61.90	110	29	26.36%	
2018	140	60.65	112	37	33.04%	
2017	136	60.35	120	36	30.00%	
2016	121	67.75	95	25	26.32%	

== Student numbers ==
In the school's first year, it had 266 students. Its peak student population was 1,534, in 1973.

Year	Number
2014	680
2015	843
2016	810
2017	830
2018	821
2019	795

== List of principals ==
Name	Years
Eric Beckwith	1966–1974
Eric Strauss	1975–1983
Robert Chambers	
Neil Ryan	
Halina Szunejko	
Karen Arnold	
John Mortimer	
Lindsay Pearse	
Eleanor Hughes	
Steve Beaton	–2021
Tracy Griffiths	2022–

== Notable alumni ==
- Narelda Jacobs – journalist and presenter for Network 10
- Renee Lim – actress and doctor
- Alisha Farrer - Actress and Model

== See also ==
- List of schools in the Perth metropolitan area
