= Eastern Hills Senior High School =

Location
- Lot 289 Keane St East; Mount Helena, Western Australia; Australia; 31°52′30″S 116°13′12″E

Information
- Type: Independent public co-educational day school
- Opened: 1892; 134 years ago
- Educational authority: WA Department of Education
- Principal: John Dunning
- Years: 7–12
- Enrolment: 961 (2021)
- Campus type: Suburban
- Colour
- Website: www.ehshs.wa.edu.au

Eastern Hills Senior High School is an Independent Public secondary school in Mount Helena, in the Perth Hills, 35 kilometres (22 mi) east of Perth, Western Australia. It serves approximately 950 students from year 7 to year 12.

== Overview ==
The school was opened originally in 1892 as Lion Mill School. In 1954, it became Mount Helena Junior High School, serving both primary students and secondary students from years eight to ten. The original school consists of single storey, linear brick buildings with a clay tile roof. It is built in a non-specific architectural style, although it borrows elements from the California bungalow style and the Post War International Style. It was built between 1951 and 1960 in three stages.

In 1963, Mount Helena Primary School was opened next to Mount Helena Junior High School. The original school was renamed to Eastern Hills High School, teaching students between year eight and ten only. The school's home economics and manual arts facilities were expanded in 1962 as well. Over the years, the school had other additions to it. More classrooms were added in c. 1964 and 1967. A computer science laboratory was built in 1967 as well, and in 1968, tennis courts were added. Changes in the curriculum resulted in additions to the school as well. A science block opened in 1966, a more specialised library was completed in 1972, and a manual arts centre opened in c. 1978.

In 1975, after advocating from parents, the school opened to year 11 students, and year 12 students the following year. This was to ease enrolments at Governor Stirling Senior High School, which was one of the largest schools in Western Australia at the time. It was chosen as more cost effective to expand Eastern Hills than to build a school in Swan View. The school was renamed to Eastern Hills Senior High School as a result.

A community recreation centre, including a gymnasium, opened in 1980.

In July 1997, a new $1.6 million technology and performing arts centre opened at the school. A new teaching block for year eights opened in 1998, and a music centre in 2006.

In 2014, Eastern Hills Senior High School became an Independent Public School. In 2015, Eastern Hills Senior High School, alongside most other public high schools in Western Australia, transitioned to having year 7 students.

On the night of Thursday, 8 September 2016, the school was heavily damaged by vandals, causing $100,000 worth of damage. Over 200 windows were broken, rooms were flooded and computers were destroyed, affecting 40% of the school. Only limited classes were held on Friday, the school telling parents to keep their children at home if possible. A 19-year-old man and a 22-year-old man were charged over the incident on Saturday 10 September. The men were convicted and given a suspended prison sentence.

In 2017, Eastern Hills Senior High School signed a sister school agreement with Taishi Senior High School (Japanese: 兵庫県立太子高等学校) in Hyogo Prefecture, Japan.

Refurbishment of the school's facilities is expected to start in August 2021, and be complete in 2022. The upgrade has a cost of $2 million. An architect for the upgrade was appointed in December 2020. The upgrade is part of the state's COVID-19 recovery plan to create jobs.

== Student numbers ==
Year	Number
2016	920
2017	944
2018	975
2019	939
2020	944
2021	961
2022	943

== Notable alumni ==
- Craig Challen – Cave diver and 2019 Australian of the Year for his involvement in the Tham Luang cave rescue
- Jemma Green – City of Perth councillor until March 2018 and acting Lord Mayor of Perth from October 2017 to January 2018
- Alyssa Hayden – Former Liberal member for Darling Range
- Louise Pratt – Labor Party Senator for Western Australia and former member of the Western Australian Legislative Council for the East Metropolitan Region

== See also ==
- List of schools in the Perth metropolitan area
