= Canning College =

School in Bentley, Western Australia

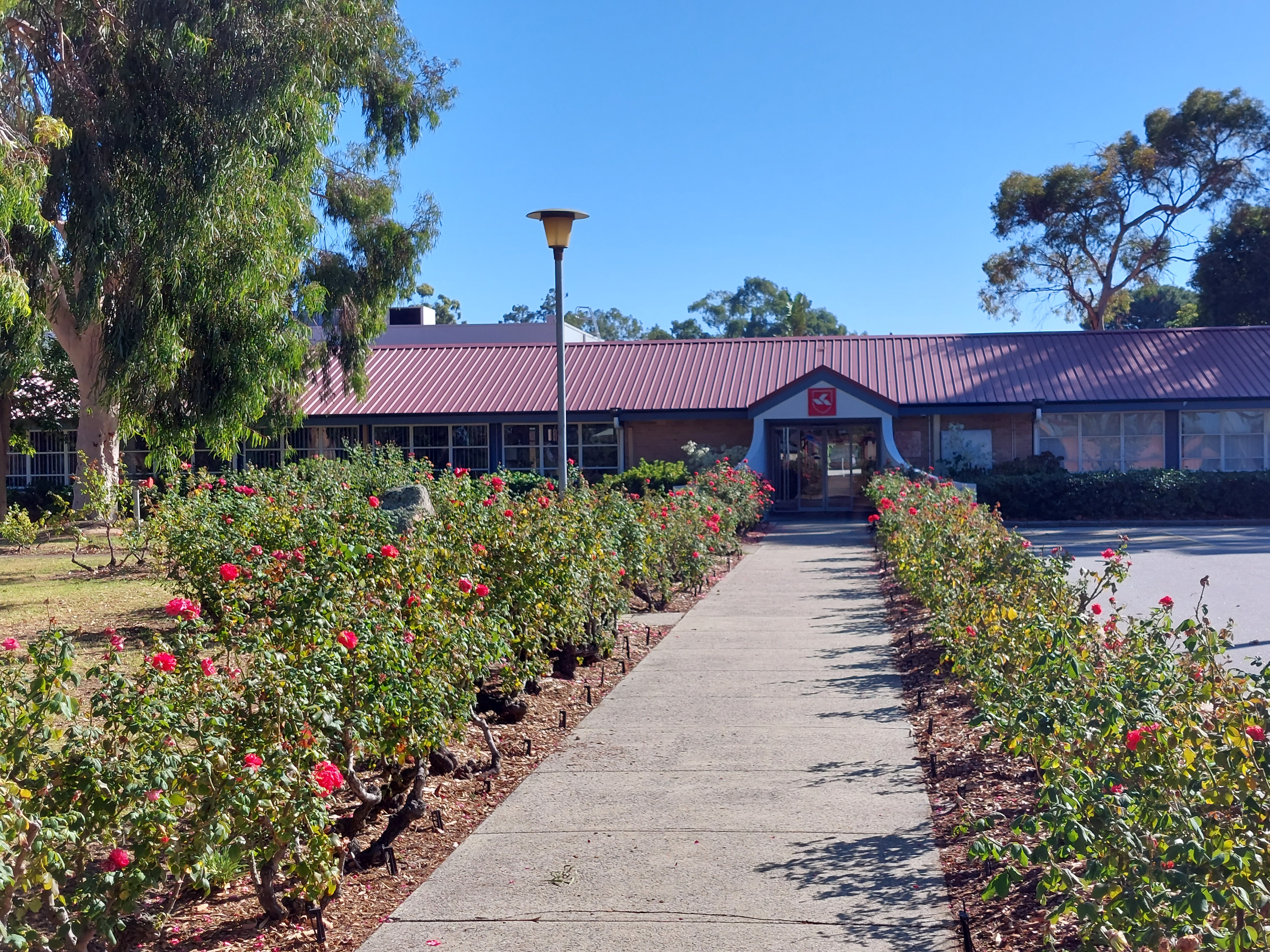

Location
- Bentley, Perth, Western Australia; Australia; 32°00′34″S 115°53′49″E

Information
- Type: Independent public Co-educational specialist high school; provider of university preparation programs
- Established: 1982; 44 years ago
- Educational authority: Department of Education
- Principal: Leila Bothams
- Years: 10, 11, 12, WA Universities' Foundation Program, Certificate IV in University Access Program, Diploma of Commerce.
- Enrolment: 200 (2022)
- International students: Local students will be reintroduced to the school which had been limited to international students only
- Campus: Suburban
- Colours: Red, white and grey
- Website: canningcollege.wa.edu.au

Canning College is a specialist education institution delivering programs that provide local and international students with pathways into universities. It delivers programs for Year 10, Year 11, Year 12 (WA Certificate of Education and WA Universities' Foundation Program), Certificate IV (in University Access Program) and Diploma of Commerce. Canning College is located on Marquis Street in Bentley, a suburb situated seven kilometres (four miles) south-east of Perth, Western Australia. It is next to Curtin University.

Established in 1982 by the Department of Education, the college initially provided secondary and tertiary-preparation education for domestic and international students completing senior secondary programs or their equivalent. From 2019, the college provided education to fee-paying international students only. From 2024, local students are also entitled to enrol into Canning College programs.

== Programs ==
Canning College provides a number of education programs:

- Western Australian Universities Foundation Program
- Western Australian Certificate of Education (Year 12)
- Certificate IV (University Access Program)
- Diploma of Commerce
  - University of Western Australia stream
  - Curtin University stream
- Year 11 Secondary studies
- Year 10 Secondary studies
- Bridging programs

== See also ==
- List of schools in the Perth metropolitan area
- List of Australian tertiary institutions
