= List of schools in the Perth metropolitan area =

This is a list of schools in the city of Perth, Western Australia. The Western Australian education system traditionally consists of primary schools, which accommodate students from Kindergarten to Year 6, and high schools, which accommodate students from Years 7 to 12. Previously primary schools accounted for Year 7 education, but in 2015 all Western Australian schools transitioned Year 7 to be a part of the high school system. In country areas, district high schools serve as both primary and junior high schools, with students generally commuting to or boarding at larger towns to finish the last two years of their education.

== Public schools ==
=== Primary schools ===
Name	Suburb	LGA	Established	Notes
Alinjarra Primary School	Alexander Heights	Wanneroo	1987	Alinjarra means "North".
Alkimos Beach Primary School	Alkimos	Wanneroo	2017	
Alkimos Primary School	Alkimos	Wanneroo	2016	
Anne Hamersley Primary School	Ellenbrook	Swan	2018	Named after Anne Hamersley, an early pastoralist in the Ellenbrook area.
Anzac Terrace Primary School	Bassendean	Bassendean	1969	Located on Anzac Terrace, Bassendean.
Applecross Primary School	Applecross	Melville	1905	
Arbor Grove Primary School	Ellenbrook	Swan	2004	Located near Arbor Drive, Ellenbrook.
Ardross Primary School	Ardross	Melville	1961	
Armadale Primary School	Armadale	Armadale	1899	Relocated in 1987
Ashburton Drive Primary School	Gosnells	Gosnells	1986	Located on Ashburton Drive, Gosnells.
Ashdale Primary School	Darch	Wanneroo	2005	Part of the Ashdale Cluster of schools alongside Landsdale PS, Landsdale Gardens PS, Madeley PS, Carnaby Rise PS and Ashdale Secondary College.
Ashfield Primary School	Ashfield	Bassendean	1955	
Aspiri Primary School	Piara Waters	Armadale	2018	Located on Aspiri Promenade, Piara Waters.
Attadale Primary School	Attadale	Melville	1953	
Atwell Primary School	Atwell	Cockburn	1998	
Aubin Grove Primary School	Aubin Grove	Cockburn	2011	
Aveley North Primary School	Aveley	Swan	2018	
Aveley Primary School	Aveley	Swan	2012	
Balcatta Primary School	Balcatta	Stirling	1964	
Baldivis Primary School	Baldivis	Rockingham	1924	
Baldivis Gardens Primary School	Baldivis	Rockingham	2017	
Balga Primary School	Balga	Stirling	1965	
Ballajura Primary School	Ballajura	Swan	1989	
Bambara Primary School	Padbury	Joondalup	1978	Name means "forest country".
Banksia Grove Primary School	Banksia Grove	Wanneroo	1997	Previously Neerabup Primary School
Banksia Park Primary School	Leeming	Melville	1989	Formerly East Leeming PS until Feb 1989 web
Bannister Creek Primary School	Ferndale	Canning	2008	Named after adjacent creek. Followed merger of Ferndale, Kinlock and Lynwood.
Bassendean Primary School	Bassendean	Bassendean	1906	Known as West Guildford until 1922
Bateman Primary School	Bateman	Melville	1970	
Bayswater Primary School	Bayswater	Bayswater	1894	
Beaconsfield Primary School	Beaconsfield	Fremantle	1890	
Beaumaris Primary School	Ocean Reef	Joondalup	1991	Situated on Beaumaris Boulevard, Ocean Reef. Formerly North Ocean Reef PS.
Beckenham Primary School	Beckenham	Canning	1912	Originally East Cannington
Beechboro Primary School	Beechboro	Swan	1988	
Beeliar Primary School	Beeliar	Cockburn	1999	
Beenyup Primary School	Byford	Serpentine-Jarrahdale	2020	
Beldon Primary School	Beldon	Joondalup	1985	
Belmay Primary School	Cloverdale	Belmont	1952	
Belmont Primary School	Belmont	Belmont	1897	
Bentley Primary School	Bentley	Canning	1952	Formerly Bentley Park PS
Bertram Primary School	Bertram	Kwinana	2007	
Bibra Lake Primary School	Bibra Lake	Cockburn	1987	
Bicton Primary School	Bicton	Melville	1903	
Bletchley Park Primary School	Southern River	Gosnells	2008	Located within the Bletchley Park residential development.
Booragoon Primary School	Booragoon	Melville	1967	
Boyare Primary School	Mirrabooka	Stirling	1991	Likely named after nearby Boyare Avenue, Mirrabooka.
Brabham Primary School	Brabham	Swan	2021	
Bramfield Park Primary School	Maddington	Gosnells	1979	Located next to Bramfield Street, Maddington. Formerly North Maddington PS.
Brentwood Primary School	Brentwood	Melville	1956	
Brookman Primary School	Langford	Gosnells	1976	Located on Brookman Avenue, Langford.
Bull Creek Primary School	Bull Creek	Melville	1975	
Bungaree Primary School	Rockingham	Rockingham	1969	Named for Dharug elder, explorer and entertainer, Bungaree.
Burrendah Primary School	Willetton	Canning	1976	Name meaning "the place of the story of the black swan" in the language of the Dharawal people. Formerly South Willetton PS.
Butler Primary School	Butler	Wanneroo	2003	
Burns Beach Primary School	Burns Beach	Joondalup	2022	
Byford Primary School	Byford	Serpentine-Jarrahdale	1901	web
Caladenia Primary School	Canning Vale	Gosnells	2007	Possibly named after the Caladenia genus of orchids which are featured in the school logo.
Calista Primary School	Calista	Kwinana	1964	
Camboon Primary School	Noranda	Bayswater	1971	Most likely named after nearby Camboon Road, Noranda.
Campbell Primary School	Canning Vale	Gosnells	2002	Located on Campbell Road, Canning Vale.
Canning Vale Primary School	Canning Vale	Canning	1912	Closed 1988, reopened at new location 1994
Caralee Community School	Willagee	Melville	2005	Name is likely a portmanteau of the merged schools is succeeded; Willagee and Carawatha.
Carine Primary School	Carine	Stirling	1978	
Carlisle Primary School	Kewdale	Belmont	1919	Named for the suburb of Carlisle.
Carnaby Rise Primary School	Landsdale	Wanneroo	2017	Like the nearby Carnaby Reserve, the school is possibly named for Carnaby's black cockatoo. Another possibility is the Carnaby Park residential estate, although it contains the Beenyup Grove Primary School. Part of the Ashdale Cluster of schools alongside Ashdale PS, Landsdale PS, Landsdale Gardens PS, Madeley PS and Ashdale Secondary College.
Carramar Primary School	Carramar	Wanneroo	2005	
Caversham Primary School	Caversham	Swan	1904	
Challis Community Primary School	Armadale	Armadale	1974	Named after Challis Road, which was named after a family who had established an orchard in the area in the 1910s.
Charthouse Primary School	Waikiki	Rockingham	1991	Located on Charthouse Road, Waikiki.
Chidlow Primary School	Chidlow	Mundaring	1897	
Churchlands Primary School	Churchlands	Stirling	1965	
City Beach Primary School	City Beach	Cambridge	1956	
Clarkson Primary School	Clarkson	Wanneroo	1993	
Clayton View Primary School	Koongamia	Swan	2004	Followed merger of Bellevue and Koongamia. Located on Clayton Street, Koongamia.
Clifton Hills Primary School	Kelmscott	Armadale	1972	Formerly Connell Avenue PS until 1975. Area is colloquially known as "Clifton Hills", named after Lewis Cliffington, an early woodcutter from the area.
Cloverdale Primary School	Cloverdale	Belmont	1961	Formerly Fisher Street PS
Collier Primary School	Como	South Perth	1948	Named after Philip Collier, 14th Premier of Western Australia. like many local sites around South Perth and Como.
Comet Bay Primary School	Secret Harbour	Rockingham	2007	Named after Comet Bay.
Como Primary School	Como	South Perth	1916	
Connolly Primary School	Connolly	Joondalup	1991	
Coogee Primary School	Coogee	Cockburn	1894	The school began in 1894, and house 10 was a teachers house in the 1800s.
Coolbellup Community School	Coolbellup	Cockburn	2005	Followed merger of Coolbellup and North Lake
Cooloongup Primary School	Cooloongup	Rockingham	1978	
Coolbinia Primary School	Coolbinia	Stirling	1955	
Cottesloe Primary School	Peppermint Grove	Peppermint Grove	1896	Named after the suburb of Cottesloe which had existed before the creation of the suburb of Peppermint Grove around the same time of the schools creation..
Craigie Heights Primary School	Craigie	Joondalup	1974	Originally Craigie PS; merged with Camberwarra PS and renamed Craigie Heights 2008; rebuilt and relocated to original Craigie PS site in 2010
Creaney Primary School	Kingsley	Joondalup	1983	Named after Creaney Drive, Kingsley. The name Kingsley could not be used due to Kingsley Primary School, Armadale existing prior to the suburb of Kingsley.
Currambine Primary School	Currambine	Joondalup	1997	
Curtin Primary School	Karawara	South Perth	1957	Likely named after nearby Curtin University, itself named after John Curtin, 14th Prime Minister of Australia. Formerly Koonawarra until 2004.
Dalkeith Primary School	Dalkeith	Nedlands	1938	
Dalmain Primary School	Kingsley	Joondalup	1990	Named after Dalmain Street, Kingsley. The name Kingsley could not be used due to Kingsley Primary School, Armadale existing prior to the suburb of Kingsley.
Darlington Primary School	Darlington	Mundaring	1912	
Davallia Primary School	Duncraig	Joondalup	1974	Named after the Davallia plant.
Dawson Park Primary School	Forrestfield	Kalamunda	1982	Likely named after the adjacent Dawson Park.
Dayton Primary School	Dayton	Swan	2023	
Deanmore Primary School	Karrinyup	Stirling	1961	Situated on Deanmore Road, Karrinyup.
Dianella Primary College	Dianella	Stirling	1963	Formerly Mirrabooka PS until 2016
Dianella Heights Primary School	Dianella	Stirling	1964	
Doubleview Primary School	Doubleview	Stirling	1951	
Dryandra Primary School	Mirrabooka	Stirling	1989	Situated on Dryandra Drive in Mirrabooka. Dryandra is a Banksia genus native to greater southwestern Western Australia.
Duncraig Primary School	Duncraig	Joondalup	1975	
East Beechboro Primary School	Beechboro	Swan	1979	
East Butler Primary School	Butler	Wanneroo	2007	
East Fremantle Primary School	East Fremantle	Fremantle	1898	
East Hamersley Primary School	Hamersley	Stirling	1979	
East Hamilton Hill Primary School	Hamilton Hill	Cockburn	1960	
East Kenwick Primary School	Kenwick	Gosnells	1980	
East Maddington Primary School	Maddington	Gosnells	1974	
East Victoria Park Primary School	East Victoria Park	Victoria Park	1914	Relocated in 1977
East Waikiki Primary School	Waikiki	Rockingham	1987	
East Wanneroo Primary School	Wanneroo	Wanneroo	1975	
Eddystone Primary School	Heathridge	Joondalup	1986	Possibly named after the Eddystone Lighthouse in Cornwall, as shown on the school crest and mentioned on the school's website.
Eden Hill Primary School	Eden Hill	Bassendean	1915	Formerly Guildford North until Dec 1915
Edgewater Primary School	Edgewater	Joondalup	1983	
Edney Primary School	High Wycombe	Kalamunda	1989	Situated on Edney Road, High Wycombe.
Ellen Stirling Primary School	Ellenbrook	Swan	2008	Like the suburb of Ellenbrook, the school is named after Ellen Stirling, the wife of Captain James Stirling, Western Australia's first governor.
Ellenbrook Primary School	Ellenbrook	Swan	1996	
Embleton Primary School	Embleton	Bayswater	1961	
Endeavour Primary School	Port Kennedy	Rockingham	2000	Located on Endeavor Drive, Port Kennedy.
Excelsior Primary School	Canning Vale	Gosnells	2005	Located on Excelsior Drive, Canning Vale.
Falls Road Primary School	Lesmurdie	Kalamunda	1979	Located on Falls Road, Lesmurdie.
Floreat Park Primary School	Floreat	Cambridge	1951	
Forest Crescent Primary School	Thornlie	Gosnells	1987	
Forrestdale Primary School	Forrestdale	Armadale	1915	Relocated in 1978
Forrestfield Primary School	Forrestfield	Kalamunda	1927	Relocated in 1965
Fremantle Primary School	Fremantle	Fremantle	1904	
Freshwater Bay Primary School	Claremont	Claremont	2011	Despite the name, Freshwater Bay is further down the river in Peppermint Grove. Formerly Claremont PS.
Gibbs Street Primary School	East Cannington	Canning	1972	Located on Gibbs Street, East Cannington.
Gidgegannup Primary School	Gidgegannup	Swan	1992	
Glen Forrest Primary School	Glen Forrest	Mundaring	1891	
Glendale Primary School	Hamersley	Stirling	1971	Like other nearby landmarks, the school is named after Glendale Avenue, Hamersley.
Glengarry Primary School	Duncraig	Joondalup	1980	Located on Glengarry Drive, Duncraig.
Golden Bay Primary School	Golden Bay	Rockingham	2015	
Goollelal Primary School	Kingsley	Joondalup	1981	Named for Lake Goollelal. Goollelal means "swamp hen". The name Kingsley could not be used due to Kingsley Primary School, Armadale existing prior to the suburb of Kingsley.
Gooseberry Hill Primary School	Gooseberry Hill	Kalamunda	1972	
Gosnells Primary School	Gosnells	Gosnells	1905	
Grandis Primary School	Banksia Grove	Wanneroo	2019	Located on Grandis Boulevard, Banksia Grove.
Greenfields Primary School	Mandurah	Mandurah	1990	Named for nearby suburb of Greenfields.
Greenmount Primary School	Greenmount	Mundaring	1913	
Greenwood Primary School	Greenwood	Joondalup	2008	Followed merger of East Greenwood and Allenswood
Grovelands Primary School	Camillo	Armadale	1979	Located on Grovelands Drive, Camillo.
Guildford Primary School	Guildford	Swan	1833	Oldest continually operating government school in WA
Gwynne Park Primary School	Brookdale	Armadale	1978	Located nearby Gwynne Park.
Halidon Primary School	Kingsley	Joondalup	1986	Located on Halidon Street, Kingsley. The name Kingsley could not be used due to Kingsley Primary School, Armadale existing prior to the suburb of Kingsley.
Hammond Park Primary School	Hammond Park	Cockburn	2014	
Hampton Park Primary School	Morley	Bayswater	1955	Existed prior to nearby Hampton Senior High School, which is named for John Hampton, 6th Governor of Western Australia.
Harmony Primary School	Atwell	Cockburn	2004	Located on Harmony Avenue, Atwell.
Harrisdale Primary School	Harrisdale	Armadale	2016	
Hawker Park Primary School	Warwick	Joondalup	1982	Origin of the name is unknown.
Heathridge Primary School	Heathridge	Joondalup	1980	
Helena Valley Primary School	Helena Valley	Mundaring	1927	
Herne Hill Primary School	Herne Hill	Swan	1922	
High Wycombe Primary School	High Wycombe	Kalamunda	1961	
Highgate Primary School	Highgate	Vincent	1895	
Hillarys Primary School	Hillarys	Joondalup	1973	Formerly Lymburner until 2002
Hillcrest Primary School	Bayswater	Bayswater	1950	
Hillman Primary School	Hillman	Rockingham	1974	
Hilton Primary School	Hilton	Fremantle	1950	Formerly Hilton Park
Hocking Primary School	Hocking	Wanneroo	2008	
Hollywood Primary School	Nedlands	Nedlands	1935	Named after the historical Hollywood precinct of Nedlands.
Honeywood Primary School	Wandi	Kwinana	2018	Named for Honeywood Estate residential development.
Hudson Park Primary School	Girrawheen	Wanneroo	1975	Previously Girrawheen PS
Huntingdale Primary School	Huntingdale	Gosnells	1977	
Illawarra Primary School	Ballajura	Swan	1981	Located on Illawarra Crescent, Ballajura.
Inglewood Primary School	Inglewood	Stirling	1920	Formerly North Inglewood
Jandakot Primary School	Jandakot	Cockburn	1901	
Jarrahdale Primary School	Jarrahdale	Serpentine-Jarrahdale	1874	Relocated in 1954
John Butler Primary College	Butler	Wanneroo	2014	Like the suburb of Butler, the school is likely named after John Butler, the first recorded explorer of the Wanneroo and Lake Joondalup areas in 1834.
Jolimont Primary School	Jolimont	Subiaco	1905	
Joondalup Primary School	Joondalup	Joondalup	1993	
Kalamunda Primary School	Kalamunda	Kalamunda	1895	
Kapinara Primary School	City Beach	Cambridge	1967	"Kapi" means water; "nara" possibly refers to the cupping of water in the hands. Name was previously thought to mean "water over there" in a mixture of Noongar and a Kimberly language although has been refuted.
Kardinya Primary School	Kardinya	Melville	1977	
Karrinyup Primary School	Karrinyup	Stirling	1964	
Kelmscott Primary School	Kelmscott	Armadale	1882	
Kensington Primary School	Kensington	South Perth	1926	
Kewdale Primary School	Kewdale	Belmont	1915	Formerly South Belmont until 1951
Kingsley Primary School	Armadale	Armadale	1969	
Kinross Primary School	Kinross	Joondalup	1995	
Koondoola Primary School	Koondoola	Wanneroo	1975	
Koorana Primary School	Warnbro	Rockingham	1994	Koorana means "bring forth the young".
Kyilla Primary School	North Perth	Vincent	1945	Formerly Selkirk Street PS. "Kyilla" was suggested for the school's new name due to an unconfirmed meaning of "north". Also possibly named for Kyilla Airliner, the largest commercial aeroplane in Australia, which was witnessed by 5000 people at the Maylands Aerodrome in November 1937.
Lake Gwelup Primary School	Gwelup	Stirling	1914	Named for nearby Lake Gwelup.
Lake Monger Primary School	Wembley	Cambridge	1954	Named for Lake Monger. Formerly Wandarra until Feb 1988.
Lakelands Primary School	Lakelands	Mandurah	2014	
Landsdale Primary School	Landsdale	Wanneroo	1999	Part of the Ashdale Cluster of schools alongside Ashdale PS, Landsdale Gardens PS, Madeley PS, Carnaby Rise PS and Ashdale Secondary College.
Lathlain Primary School	Lathlain	Victoria Park	1956	
Leda Primary School	Leda	Kwinana	1992	
Leeming Primary School	Leeming	Melville	1982	
Lesmurdie Primary School	Lesmurdie	Kalamunda	1920	
Lockridge Primary School	Lockridge	Swan	1971	
Maddington Primary School	Maddington	Gosnells	1914	
Madeley Primary School	Madeley	Wanneroo	2009	Part of the Ashdale Cluster of schools alongside Ashdale PS, Landsdale PS, Landsdale Gardens PS, Carnaby Rise PS and Ashdale Secondary College.
Madora Bay Primary School	Madora Bay	Mandurah	2023	
Maida Vale Primary School	Maida Vale	Kalamunda	1912	
Makybe Rise Primary School	Baldivis	Rockingham	2011	Situated on Makybe Drive, Baldivis.
Malvern Springs Primary School	Ellenbrook	Swan	2012	Named after Malvern Springs residential estate.
Mandurah Primary School	Mandurah	Mandurah	1872	
Manning Primary School	Manning	South Perth	1936	Canning Bridge until 1939; Como South until 1951
Marangaroo Primary School	Marangaroo	Wanneroo	1987	
Marmion Primary School	Marmion	Joondalup	1956	
Marri Grove Primary School	Byford	Serpentine-Jarrahdale	1993	Formerly West Byford PS
Maylands Peninsula Primary School	Maylands	Bayswater	2004	Followed merger of Maylands and East Maylands. Located on the Maylands Peninsula. The former site of Maylands Primary School is now used by the Constable Care Safety School.
Meadow Springs Primary School	Meadow Springs	Mandurah	2012	
Medina Primary School	Medina	Kwinana	1954	
Melville Primary School	Melville	Melville	1957	New school constructed in 2005, immediately adjoining the site of old school which is now a public park
Merriwa Primary School	Merriwa	Wanneroo	1995	
Middle Swan Primary School	Middle Swan	Swan	1839	Relocated to Stratton in 1991
Midvale Primary School	Midvale	Swan	1954	
Millen Primary School	East Victoria Park	Victoria Park	1936	Most likely named after Edward Millen, Federal Minister for Defence and Repatriation during WWI. Other locations around East Victoria Park are also named after him, like Edward Millen House, Edward Millen Park and a hospital.
Mindarie Primary School	Mindarie	Wanneroo	1997	
Morley Primary School	Morley	Bayswater	1934	
Mosman Park Primary School	Mosman Park	Mosman Park	1906	
Mount Claremont Primary School	Mount Claremont	Nedlands	1915	Originally Graylands; renamed in 2006
Mount Hawthorn Primary School	Mount Hawthorn	Vincent	1906	
Mount Helena Primary School	Mount Helena	Mundaring	1890	Whites Mill 1890–1898; Lion Mill 1898–1925
Mount Lawley Primary School	Mount Lawley	Stirling	1912	Relocated due to arson from July 2012 until beginning of 2015.
Mount Pleasant Primary School	Mount Pleasant	Melville	1953	
Mullaloo Beach Primary School	Mullaloo	Joondalup	1986	
Mullaloo Heights Primary School	Mullaloo	Joondalup	1978	
Mundaring Primary School	Mundaring	Mundaring	1907	
Mundijong Primary School	Mundijong	Serpentine-Jarrahdale	1896	
Nedlands Primary School	Nedlands	Nedlands	1913	
Neerigen Brook Primary School	Armadale	Armadale	1970	Named after nearby Neerigen Brook. Formerly West Armadale PS.
Newborough Primary School	Karrinyup	Stirling	1955	Located on Newborough Street, Karrinyup. Formerly North Scarborough until 1971.
Newton Primary School	Spearwood	Cockburn	1981	Located on Newton Street, Spearwood.
Nollamara Primary School	Nollamara	Stirling	1956	
Noranda Primary School	Noranda	Bayswater	1980	
North Balga Primary School	Balga	Stirling	1968	
North Beach Primary School	North Beach	Stirling	1934	Formerly Hamersley until 1970
North Cottesloe Primary School	Cottesloe	Cottesloe	1913	web
North Dandalup Primary School	North Dandalup	Murray	1900	
North Fremantle Primary School	North Fremantle	Fremantle	1887	
North Harrisdale Primary School	Harrisdale	Armadale	2021	
North Mandurah Primary School	Mandurah	Mandurah	1982	
North Morley Primary School	Dianella	Bayswater	1970	Located slightly outside the north-western corner of Morley.
North Parmelia Primary School	Parmelia	Kwinana	1971	
North Perth Primary School	North Perth	Vincent	1899	
North Woodvale Primary School	Woodvale	Joondalup	1990	
Oakwood Primary School	Meadow Springs	Mandurah	2018	Situated on Oakwood Gate, Meadow Springs.
Oberthur Primary School	Bull Creek	Melville	1979	Located on Oberthur Crescent, Bull Creek.
Ocean Reef Primary School	Ocean Reef	Joondalup	1988	
Orange Grove Primary School	Orange Grove	Gosnells	1923	
Orelia Primary School	Orelia	Kwinana	1969	
Osborne Primary School	Osborne Park	Stirling	1903	
Padbury Primary School	Padbury	Joondalup	1973	
Palmyra Primary School	Palmyra	Fremantle	1913	
Parkerville Primary School	Parkerville	Mundaring	1899	
Parkwood Primary School	Parkwood	Canning	1975	Formerly West Lynwood PS until Feb 1989
Pearsall Primary School	Pearsall	Wanneroo	2013	
Phoenix Primary School	Hamilton Hill	Cockburn	1976	Located on Phoenix Road, Hamilton Hill.
Piara Waters Primary School	Piara Waters	Armadale	2012	
Pickering Brook Primary School	Pickering Brook	Kalamunda	1915	
Pinjarra Primary School	Pinjarra	Murray	1954	
Port Kennedy Primary School	Port Kennedy	Rockingham	1996	
Poseidon Primary School	Heathridge	Joondalup	1986	Located on Poseidon Road, Heathridge.
Poynter Primary School	Duncraig	Joondalup	1980	Located on Poynter Drive, Duncraig
Queens Park Primary School	Queens Park	Canning	1905	
Quinns Beach Primary School	Quinns Rocks	Wanneroo	2001	Located close to Quinns Beach.
Quinns Rocks Primary School	Quinns Rocks	Wanneroo	1980	
Ranford Primary School	Canning Vale	Canning	1999	
Rawlinson Primary School	Marangaroo	Wanneroo	2005	Located on Rawlinson Drive, Marangaroo. Originally East Marangaroo.
Redcliffe Primary School	Redcliffe	Belmont	1908	
Richmond Primary School	East Fremantle	Fremantle	1921	Richmond is a historic precinct of East Fremantle.
Riva Primary School	Piara Waters	Armadale	2022	Named after Riva Estate residential development.
Rivergums Primary School	Baldivis	Rockingham	2016	Named after Rivergums housing estate.
Riverside Primary School	Greenfields	Mandurah	1995	Close to the Serpentine River
Riverton Primary School	Riverton	Canning	1949	
Rockingham Beach Primary School	Rockingham	Rockingham	1895	Located close to Rockingham Beach.
Rockingham Lakes Primary School	Port Kennedy	Rockingham	2002	Named for the Rockingham Lakes; Lake Cooloongup and Lake Walyungup.
Rosalie Primary School	Shenton Park	Subiaco	1906	The school and nearby park are named after a historic Rosalea Estate. Date of spelling change is unknown.
Roseworth Primary School	Girrawheen	Wanneroo	2008	Followed merger of Hainsworth and Montrose
Rossmoyne Primary School	Rossmoyne	Canning	1964	
Rostrata Primary School	Willetton	Canning	1983	Located on Rostrata Avenue, Willetton.
Safety Bay Primary School	Safety Bay	Rockingham	1942	
Samson Primary School	Samson	Melville	1986	
Sawyers Valley Primary School	Sawyers Valley	Mundaring	1884	
Scarborough Primary School	Scarborough	Stirling	1934	
Seaforth Primary School	Gosnells	Gosnells	1972	Like other landmarks such as the nearby railway station, the school is named after a historic farm in the Gosnells area.
Secret Harbour Primary School	Secret Harbour	Rockingham	1997	
Serpentine Primary School	Serpentine	Serpentine-Jarrahdale	1880	
Settlers Primary School	Baldivis	Rockingham	2005	Named after Settlers Hill housing estate.
Shelley Primary School	Shelley	Canning	1975	
Sheoak Grove Primary School	Baldivis	Rockingham	2020	Nyilla-nyilla, "Nyilla" being the name of the street where the school is situated, is the Noongar name for the fruit attached to the sheoak tree.
Shorehaven Primary School	Alkimos	Wanneroo	2022	Near Shorehaven Beach. Located on Shorehaven Boulevard within the Shorehaven residential estate.
Singleton Primary School	Singleton	Rockingham	1996	
Somerly Primary School	Clarkson	Wanneroo	2009	Located within the Somerly housing development.
Sorrento Primary School	Sorrento	Joondalup	1970	
South Ballajura Primary School	Ballajura	Swan	1994	
South Coogee Primary School	Beeliar	Cockburn	1921	South Coogee is the historical name for the area which has since been subdivided.
South Lake Primary School	South Lake	Cockburn	1986	
South Padbury Primary School	Padbury	Joondalup	1989	
South Perth Primary School	South Perth	South Perth	1898	
South Thornlie Primary School	Thornlie	Gosnells	1976	
Southern Grove Primary School	Southern River	Gosnells	2018	
Southwell Primary School	Hamilton Hill	Cockburn	1974	Likely named after nearby Southwell Crescent, Hamilton Hill.
Spearwood Primary School	Spearwood	Cockburn	1914	Relocated in 1972 (originally at Watson Oval)
Spring Hill Primary School	Tapping	Wanneroo	2011	Located on Spring Hill, Tapping.
Springfield Primary School	Kallaroo	Joondalup	1972	Named after Springfield housing development.
St Gerard's Primary School	Westminster	Stirling	1965	
Subiaco Primary School	Subiaco	Subiaco	1897	
Success Primary School	Success	Cockburn	2009	
Sutherland Dianella Primary School	Dianella	Stirling	1966	Located on Sutherland Avenue, Dianella.
Swan View Primary School	Swan View	Swan	1942	
Swanbourne Primary School	Swanbourne	Nedlands	1905	Called North Claremont 1905–1921; relocated in 2001 from Devon Road
Takari Primary School	Balcatta	Stirling	1969	Takari means "tomorrow" or "future". Formerly North Balcatta PS.
Tapping Primary School	Tapping	Wanneroo	2007	
Thornlie Primary School	Thornlie	Gosnells	1960	
Treeby Primary School	Treeby	Cockburn	2022	
Rivervale Primary School	Rivervale	Belmont	1954	Previously Tranby PS.
Tuart Hill Primary School	Tuart Hill	Stirling	1910	
Tuart Rise Primary School	Baldivis	Rockingham	2015	The western portion of Baldivis contains tuart trees. School is not located within the Tuart Ridge residential estate.
Two Rocks Primary School	Two Rocks	Wanneroo	2007	
Upper Swan Primary School	Upper Swan	Swan	1905	
Victoria Park Primary School	Victoria Park	Victoria Park	1894	
Waddington Primary School	Koondoola	Wanneroo	1979	Surrounded by Waddington Crescent, Koondoola.
Waikiki Primary School	Waikiki	Rockingham	2002	
Walliston Primary School	Walliston	Kalamunda	1970	
Wanneroo Primary School	Wanneroo	Wanneroo	1899	
Warnbro Primary School	Warnbro	Rockingham	1973	
Warriapendi Primary School	Balga	Stirling	1970	Formerly N.E. Balga until 1971
Wattle Grove Primary School	Wattle Grove	Kalamunda	1915	
Weld Square Primary School	Morley	Bayswater	1970	Located on Weld Square.
Wellard Primary School	Wellard	Kwinana	2018	
Wembley Primary School	Wembley	Cambridge	1936	
Wembley Downs Primary School	Wembley Downs	Stirling	1959	
West Balcatta Primary School	Balcatta	Stirling	1977	
West Beechboro Primary School	Beechboro	Swan	1992	
West Byford Primary School	Byford	Serpentine-Jarrahdale	2013	
West Greenwood Primary School	Greenwood	Joondalup	1977	
West Leederville Primary School	West Leederville	Cambridge	1898	
West Leeming Primary School	Leeming	Melville	1986	
West Morley Primary School	Dianella	Stirling	1968	Located to the west of Morley.
Westfield Park Primary School	Camillo	Armadale	1970	Located next to Westfield Park Reserve.
Westminster Primary School	Westminster	Stirling	1958	Formerly North Nollamara PS
White Gum Valley Primary School	White Gum Valley	Fremantle	1901	
Willandra Primary School	Seville Grove	Armadale	1993	
Willetton Primary School	Willetton	Canning	1970	
Wilson Primary School	Wilson	Canning	1963	
Winterfold Primary School	Beaconsfield	Fremantle	1967	Likely named after nearby Winterfold Road.
Winthrop Primary School	Winthrop	Melville	1991	
Wirrabirra Primary School	Gosnells	Gosnells	1970	Name means "place of trees near water". Formerly West Gosnells until 1971.
Woodbridge Primary School	Woodbridge	Swan	1934	Formerly West Midland PS
Woodland Grove Primary School	Byford	Serpentine-Jarrahdale	2017	Named after Woodland Grove residential estate.
Woodlands Primary School	Woodlands	Stirling	1964	
Woodlupine Primary School	Forrestfield	Kalamunda	1978	Nearby Woodlupine Brook which flows through Forrestfield town centre.
Woodvale Primary School	Woodvale	Joondalup	1987	
Wooroloo Primary School	Wooroloo	Mundaring	1896	Formerly Byfields Mill until 1898
Yale Primary School	Thornlie	Gosnells	1969	Located on Yale Road, Thornlie.
Yanchep Beach Primary School	Yanchep	Wanneroo	2014	Named for nearby Yanchep Beach in northern Yanchep.
Yanchep Lagoon Primary School	Yanchep	Wanneroo	1975	Named for the Yanchep Lagoon in southern Yanchep. Formerly Yanchep District High School until 2018.
Yanchep Rise Primary School	Yanchep	Wanneroo	2021	Located on the eastern dune of Yanchep.
Yangebup Primary School	Yangebup	Cockburn	1982	
Yarralinka Primary School	Southern River	Gosnells	2021	Located on Yarralinka Road, Southern River. Named after a type of disease-resistant wheat.
Yokine Primary School	Yokine	Stirling	1959	
Yuluma Primary School	Innaloo	Stirling	1960	Nearby Yuluma Park and Reserve. Formerly North Innaloo until 1997.

=== High schools ===
Name	Suburb	LGA	Established	Notes
Applecross Senior High School	Ardross	Melville	1958	HS until 1960
Armadale Senior High School	Armadale	Armadale	1953	JHS until 1954; HS until 1962
Ashdale Secondary College	Darch	Wanneroo	2009	7–12. Part of the Ashdale Cluster of schools alongside Ashdale PS, Landsdale PS, Landsdale Gardens PS, Madeley PS and Carnaby Rise PS.
Atwell College	Atwell	Cockburn	2008	
Aveley Secondary College	Ellenbrook	Swan	2018	
Balga Senior High School	Balga	Stirling	1970	
Baldivis Secondary College	Baldivis	Rockingham	2013	
Balcatta Senior High School	Balcatta	Stirling	1967	
Ballajura Community College	Ballajura	Swan	1995	7–12
Belmont City College	Belmont	Belmont	1957	Formerly Belmont SHS until 2000
Belridge Secondary College	Beldon	Joondalup	1991	
Bob Hawke College	Subiaco	Subiaco	2020	
Bullsbrook College	Bullsbrook	Swan	1952	K–12, PS until 1953; SHS until 2013
Butler College	Butler	Wanneroo	2013	
Byford Secondary College	Byford	Jarrahdale	2014	
Cannington Community College	Cannington	Canning	2001	K–10
Canning Vale College	Canning Vale	Gosnells	2004	
Carine Senior High School	Carine	Stirling	1973	HS until 1976
Cecil Andrews College	Seville Grove	Armadale	1980	Formerly SHS until 2016
Churchlands Senior High School	Churchlands	Stirling	1962	HS until 1966
Clarkson Community High School	Clarkson	Wanneroo	1996	
Comet Bay College	Secret Harbour	Rockingham	2006	
Como Secondary College	Como	South Perth	1969	Formerly Como SHS
Darling Range Sports College	Forrestfield	Kalamunda	1975	Formerly Forrestfield SHS until 2008
Dianella Secondary College	Dianella	Stirling	1965	Formerly Mirrabooka SHS until 2016
Duncraig Senior High School	Duncraig	Joondalup	1979	
Eastern Hills Senior High School	Mount Helena	Mundaring	1962	Mount Helena JHS until 1961
Ellenbrook Secondary College	Ellenbrook	Swan	2007	
Fremantle College	South Fremantle	Fremantle	2018	Replaced Hamilton and South Fremantle SHSs
Gilmore College	Orelia	Kwinana	1956	Formerly Kwinana SHS until 2006
Girrawheen Senior High School	Girrawheen	Wanneroo	1974	
Governor Stirling Senior High School	Midland	Swan	1946	Originally Midland Junction HS until 1959; 8–10 until 1954
Greenwood College	Greenwood	Joondalup	1976	Formerly Greenwood Senior High School
Hammond Park Secondary College	Hammond Park	Cockburn	2020	
Hampton Senior High School	Morley	Bayswater	1966	
Harrisdale Senior High School	Harrisdale	Armadale	2017	
John Curtin College of the Arts	Fremantle	Fremantle	1954	
John Forrest Secondary College	Morley	Bayswater	1961	HS until 1965; SHS until 2010; known as Embleton until 1962
Kalamunda Senior High School	Kalamunda	Kalamunda	1960	JHS until 1961; HS until 1971
Kelmscott Senior High School	Kelmscott	Armadale	1973	
Kent Street Senior High School	Kensington	South Perth	1940	Central school until 1946; HS until 1952
Kiara College	Kiara	Swan	1974	Formerly Lockridge Senior High School until 2015
Kinross College	Kinross	Joondalup	2002	6–10
Lakeland Senior High School	South Lake	Cockburn	1990	
Leeming Senior High School	Leeming	Melville	1985	
Lesmurdie Senior High School	Lesmurdie	Kalamunda	1981	
Lynwood Senior High School	Parkwood	Canning	1974	Parkwood was originally part of Lynwood, hence the name of the school
Melville Senior High School	Melville	Melville	1960	HS until 1964 web
Mindarie Senior College	Mindarie	Wanneroo	2003	
Morley Senior High School	Noranda	Bayswater	1970	
Mount Lawley Senior High School	Mount Lawley	Stirling	1955	HS until 1959
Ocean Reef Senior High School	Ocean Reef	Joondalup	1984	
Perth Modern School	Subiaco	Subiaco	1911	Academically selective 1912–1958, and since 2007
Piara Waters Senior High School	Piara Waters	Armadale	2023	
Ridge View Secondary College	Baldivis	Rockingham	2019	
Rockingham Senior High School	Rockingham	Rockingham	1971	
Roleystone Community College	Roleystone	Armadale	1983	K–10; DHS (6–10) until 2011
Rossmoyne Senior High School	Rossmoyne	Canning	1968	
Safety Bay Senior High School	Safety Bay	Rockingham	1978	
Shenton College	Shenton Park	Subiaco	2001	Previously Swanbourne SHS and Hollywood SHS
Southern River College	Gosnells	Gosnells	1976	Formerly Gosnells SHS until 2005
Sevenoaks Senior College	Cannington	Canning	2001	11–12 only
Swan View Senior High School	Swan View	Mundaring	1977	
Thornlie Senior High School	Thornlie	Gosnells	1971	
Wanneroo Secondary College	Wanneroo	Wanneroo	1977	SHS until 2013
Warnbro Community High School	Warnbro	Rockingham	1995	
Warwick Senior High School	Warwick	Joondalup	1981	
Willetton Senior High School	Willetton	Canning	1977	
Woodvale Secondary College	Woodvale	Joondalup	1985	SHS until 2010
Yanchep Secondary College	Yanchep	Wanneroo	2018	Replaced Yanchep District High School
Yule Brook College	Maddington	Gosnells	1978	Formerly Maddington SHS, renamed in 2000

=== Other schools ===
Name	Suburb	LGA	Established	Notes
Burbridge School	Koondoola	Wanneroo	1979	Education support
Canning College	Bentley	Canning	1982	Adult re-entry school
Carson Street School	East Victoria Park	Victoria Park	1955	Primary education support
Castlereagh School	Willetton	Canning	1978	Education support
Coolbellup Learning Centre	Coolbellup	Cockburn	1985	Education support
Cyril Jackson Senior Campus	Bassendean	Bassendean	1982	Adult re-entry school & Education Support
Fremantle Language Development Centre	3 campuses		1982	K–3 language specialist
Forrestdale Community Kindergarten	Forrestdale	Armadale	1975	Community kindergarten
Gladys Newton School	Balga	Stirling	1959	Education support
Kensington Secondary School	Kensington	South Perth	1962	Secondary education support; formerly South Kensington School until 2002
Kenwick School	Kenwick	Gosnells	1981	Education support
Malibu School	Safety Bay	Rockingham	1982	Education support
Moorditj Noongar Community School	Midland	Swan	2001	Aboriginal K–7 school
Mosman Park School for Deaf Children	Mosman Park	Mosman Park	1947	Specialist support
North East Metro; Language Development Centre	3 campuses		1983	K–3 language specialist
North Lake Senior Campus	Kardinya	Melville	1973	Adult re-entry school
Peel Language Development Centre	Port Kennedy	Rockingham	2002	K–3 language specialist
School of Isolated and Distance Education	Leederville	Vincent	1918	Distance education
Sir David Brand School	Coolbinia	Stirling	1985	Education support
South East Metro; Language Development Centre	3 campuses		1985	K–3 language specialist
Tuart College	Tuart Hill	Stirling	1982	Adult re-entry school
WA Institute for Deaf Children	Cottesloe	Cottesloe	1985	Specialist support
Wattle Grove School	Wattle Grove	Kalamunda	2011	
West Coast Language Development Centre	2 campuses		1984	K–3 language specialist

=== Defunct public schools ===
Primary schools

Name	Suburb	LGA	Opened	Closed	Notes
Allenswood Primary School	Greenwood	Joondalup	1976	2007	Amalgamated into Greenwood PS
Barton's Mill School	Pickering Brook	Kalamunda	1910	1947	
Bedfordale Primary School	Bedfordale	Armadale	1896	1954	Formerly Narrogin Brook until 1903
Bellevue Primary School	Bellevue	Swan	1903	2004	Amalgamated into Clayton View PS
Bibra Lake Primary School	Bibra Lake	Cockburn	1892	1966	Unrelated to present school of same name
Birralee Primary School	Innaloo	Stirling	1962	1996	Amalgamated with existing North Innaloo (Yuluma) PS
Blackmore Primary School	Girrawheen	Wanneroo	1971	2008	Amalgamated with existing Girrawheen Primary School.
Camberwarra Primary School	Craigie	Joondalup	1977	2010	Amalgamated with Craigie PS; renamed Craigie Heights; relocated back to Craigie PS site in 2010
Cannington Primary School	Cannington	Canning	1891	2000	Closed for new Cannington Community College
Canning Mills Primary School	Roleystone	Armadale	1891	1956	
Canning Vale Primary School	Canning Vale	Canning	1913	1987	Unrelated to present school of same name; known as North Jandakot in 1913–14
Carawatha Primary School	Willagee	Melville	1957	2005	Amalgamated into Caralee CS
Carmel Primary School	Carmel	Kalamunda	1904	1990	Formerly Heidelberg until 1916
Churchman's Brook School	Bedfordale	Armadale	1914	1926	
Claremont Primary School	Claremont	Claremont	1893	2011	Central school 1909–1946; HS 1946–1960; amalgamated into Freshwater Bay PS.
Coolbellup Primary School	Coolbellup	Cockburn	1965	2004	Amalgamated into Coolbellup CC
Dianella Primary School	Dianella	Stirling	195?	1995	Formerly Cleveland Street PS; amalgamated with existing Sutherland PS
East Claremont Primary School	Claremont	Claremont	1905	2011	Amalgamated into Freshwater Bay PS
East Greenwood Primary School	Greenwood	Joondalup	1980	2007	Amalgamated into Greenwood PS
East Maylands Primary School	Maylands	Bayswater	1954	2004	Amalgamated into Maylands Peninsula PS
East Perth Primary School	East Perth	Perth	1895	?	
East Rockingham Primary School	East Rockingham	Kwinana	1923	1975	
Ferndale Primary School	Ferndale	Canning	1979	2008	Amalgamated into Bannister Creek PS
Greenwood Primary School	Greenwood	Joondalup	1976?	1998?	Peppermint Drive site; unrelated to current school of same name
Hainsworth Primary School	Girrawheen	Wanneroo	1972	2007	Amalgamated into Roseworth PS
Hamilton Hill Primary School	Hamilton Hill	Cockburn	1903	1987	
Hopelands School	Hopeland	Serpentine-Jarrahdale	1924	1978	
Hope Valley Primary School	Hope Valley	Cockburn	1960	2005	Formerly Naval Base PS
Innaloo Primary School	Innaloo	Stirling	1914	1959	Njookenbooroo until 1926; Scarborough until 1928; relocated to North Innaloo (Yuluma)
Karnup Primary School	Karnup	Rockingham	1926	1947	
Karragullen Primary School	Karragullen	Armadale	1913	1999	Formerly Illawarra; relocated in 1920
Kenwick Primary School	Kenwick	Gosnells	1938	1979	Re-opened as a special school
Kinlock Primary School	Ferndale	Canning	1967	2008	Amalgamated into Bannister Creek PS
Koongamia Primary School	Koongamia	Swan	1957	2004	Amalgamated into Clayton View PS
Koorilla Primary School	Coolbellup	Cockburn	1969	2004	Formerly South Coolbellup PS; amalgamated into Coolbellup CC
Langford Primary School	Langford	Gosnells	1972	2008	Amalgamated with existing Brookman PS
Leederville Primary School	Leederville	Vincent	1900	1994	Became SIDE centre
Lynwood Primary School	Lynwood	Canning	1970	2008	Amalgamated into Bannister Creek PS
Mandogalup Primary School	Mandogalup	Kwinana	1921	1944	
Maylands Primary School	Maylands	Bayswater	1903	2004	Amalgamated into Maylands Peninsula PS
McKay Street Primary School	Bentley	Canning	1967	1983	
Midland Primary School	Midland	Swan	1894	2005	
Montrose Primary School	Girrawheen	Wanneroo	1974	2007	Amalgamated into Roseworth PS
Mundaring Weir Primary School	Mundaring Weir	Mundaring	1899	1959	
Newcastle Street Primary School	Northbridge	Perth	1895	1977	Formerly West Perth until 1928
North Lake Primary School	Coolbellup	Cockburn	1967	2004	Formerly East Coolbellup; amalgamated into Coolbellup CC
Oakford Primary School	Oakford	Serpentine-Jarrahdale	1923	1998	
Piesse Brook Primary School	Piesse Brook	Kalamunda	1928	1954	
Rivervale Primary School	Rivervale	Belmont	1907	1990	Formerly Burswood until 1923
Roleystone Primary School	Roleystone	Armadale	1905	2011	K-5 only; amalgamated with Roleystone DHS
Rottnest Primary School	Rottnest	Fremantle	1885	2009	Moved to present location in 1963; amalgamated with Beaconsfield PS in December 2009
South Kensington Primary School	Kensington	South Perth	1948	1962	Re-opened as a special school
Thomas Street Primary School	Subiaco	Subiaco	1904	1979	
Wanneroo Junior Primary School	Wanneroo	Wanneroo			Amalgamated with Wanneroo Primary School
Warwick Primary School	Warwick	Joondalup	1974	1996	
Wattleup Primary School	Wattleup	Cockburn	1977	2005	
West Perth Primary School	West Perth	Perth	?	1985	
West Swan Primary School	West Swan	Swan	1892	1982	
Whiteside Primary School	Cloverdale	Belmont	1964	1998	Amalgamated with existing Cloverdale PS
Willagee Primary School	Willagee	Melville	1953	2005	Amalgamated into Caralee CS

High schools

Name	Suburb	LGA	Opened	Closed	Notes
Bentley Senior High School	Bentley	Canning	1960	1982	HS until 1966; became Canning College
Cannington Senior High School	Cannington	Canning	1965	2001	Became Cannington Community College and Sevenoaks Senior College
City Beach Senior High School	City Beach	Cambridge	1966	2005	Now an international school
Claremont High School	Claremont	Claremont	1947	1958	Split from Claremont PS, merged into Hollywood SHS
Craigie Senior High School	Craigie	Joondalup	1976	2003	
Cyril Jackson Senior High School	Bassendean	Bassendean	1962	1981	HS until 1967; became Cyril Jackson Senior Campus
Fremantle Boys' High School	Fremantle	Fremantle	1854	1954	Merged with Princess May GHS into John Curtin SHS
Girdlestone High School	Perth	Perth	1847	1960	Formerly Perth Girls'; central school from 1909 (co-located with Perth Boys'); split 1936 to form Perth Central Girls' and Perth Girls' (East Perth); became HS and renamed Girdlestone in July 1946
Hamilton Senior High School	Hamilton Hill	Cockburn	1962	2017	HS until 1968; merged into Fremantle College
Hollywood Senior High School	Nedlands	Nedlands	1958	2000	Merged into Shenton College
Kewdale Senior High School	Kewdale	Belmont	1965	1999	Merged into Belmont City College
Padbury Senior High School	Padbury	Joondalup	1987	2011	
Perth Boys High School	East Perth	Perth	1847	1958	Central school from 1909; high school July 1946
Perth Girls' High School	East Perth	Perth	1936	1962	
Princess May High School	Fremantle	Fremantle	1848	1954	Formerly Fremantle Girls'; became central school 1909, renamed and became HS 1935; merged with Fremantle Boys' into John Curtin SHS
Scarborough Senior High School	Scarborough	Stirling	1959	1999	HS until 1963
South Fremantle Senior High School	South Fremantle	Fremantle	1967	2017	Merged into Fremantle College
Swanbourne Senior High School	Swanbourne	Nedlands	1961	2000	HS until 1965; merged into Shenton College
Tuart Hill Senior High School	Tuart Hill	Stirling	1956	1982	Became Tuart College
Yanchep District High School	Yanchep	Wanneroo	1975	2017	Replaced by Yanchep Lagoon Primary School and Yanchep Secondary College

== Private schools ==
=== Catholic primary schools ===
In Western Australia, Catholic primary schools are usually (but not always) linked to a parish. Prior to the 1970s, most schools were founded by religious institutes, but with the decrease in membership of these institutes, together with major reforms inside the church, lay teachers and administrators began to take over the schools, a process which completed by approximately 1990. The Catholic Education Office (CEO), headquartered in Leederville, was established in 1993 and is responsible for co-ordinating administration, curriculum and policy across the Catholic school system. Preference for enrolment is given to Catholic students from the parish or local area, although non-Catholic students are admitted if room is available.

Until 2009, Catholic primary schools accommodate students from kindergarten to year 7 in the Western Australian school system, but from 2010, year 7 students are accommodated by the Catholic high school system. The change is limited to Catholic schools; almost all others (state and independent) remain K–7 schools.

Name	Suburb	LGA	Opened	Notes
Aranmore Catholic Primary School	Leederville	Vincent	1976	Formerly St Mary's
Christ The King School	Beaconsfield	Fremantle	1903	
Emmaus Catholic Primary School	Dayton	Swan		
Francis Jordan Catholic School	Currambine	Joondalup	1995	Currambine Catholic PS until 2013
Good Shepherd Catholic Primary School	Kelmscott	Armadale	1977	
Good Shepherd Catholic School	Lockridge	Swan	1983	
Hammond Park Catholic Primary School	Hammond Park	Cockburn	2013	
Holy Rosary Primary School	Doubleview	Stirling	1959	
Holy Spirit Primary School	City Beach	Cambridge	1965	
Infant Jesus Primary School	Morley	Bayswater	1954	
Liwara Catholic Primary School	Greenwood	Joondalup	1973	
Majella Catholic Primary School	Balga	Stirling	1971	
Mary MacKillop Community Primary School	Ballajura	Swan	1989	
Mary's Mount Primary School	Gooseberry Hill	Kalamunda	1921	
Mater Christi Catholic Primary School	Yangebup	Cockburn	1989	
Matthew Gibney Catholic Primary School	High Wycombe	Kalamunda	1991	
Mel Maria Catholic Primary School	Attadale	Melville	1973	Merger of three earlier primary schools
Notre Dame Catholic Primary School	Cloverdale	Belmont	1960	
Orana Catholic Primary School	Willetton	Canning	1979	
Our Lady's Assumption Primary School	Dianella	Stirling	1967	
Our Lady of Fatima Primary School	Palmyra	Melville	1923	Formerly St Gerard's
Our Lady of Good Counsel Primary School	Karrinyup	Stirling	1965	
Our Lady of Grace Primary School	North Beach	Stirling	1954	
Our Lady of Lourdes Primary School	Nollamara	Stirling	1958	
Our Lady of Mercy Primary School	Girrawheen	Wanneroo	1975	
Our Lady of Mt Carmel Primary School	Hilton	Fremantle	1954	
Padbury Catholic Primary School	Padbury	Joondalup	1984	
Queen of Apostles Catholic Primary School	Riverton	Canning	1956	
Sacred Heart Primary School	Highgate	Vincent	1898	
Sacred Heart Primary School	Thornlie	Gosnells	1965	Relocated in 1988
Sacred Heart Primary School	Mundaring	Mundaring	1953	
Santa Clara Primary School	St James	Canning	1954	
St Andrew's Primary School	Clarkson	Wanneroo	1997	
St Anthony's Primary School	Greenmount	Mundaring	1957	Relocated from Midvale in 1988
St Anthony's Primary School	Wanneroo	Wanneroo	1935	
St Augustine's Primary School	Rivervale	Belmont	1952	
St Benedict's School	Applecross	Melville	1953	
St Bernadette's Catholic Primary School	Port Kennedy	Rockingham	1994	
St Brigid's Primary School	Middle Swan	Swan	1902	Relocated from Midland in 1991.
St Columba's Catholic Primary School	Bayswater	Bayswater	1936	
St Columba's Catholic Primary School	South Perth	South Perth	1908	
St Denis Catholic School	Joondanna	Stirling	1952	
St Dominic's School	Innaloo	Stirling	1955	
St Elizabeth's Catholic Primary School	Hocking	Wanneroo		
St Emilie's Catholic Primary School	Canning Vale	Gosnells	2001	
St Francis of Assisi Catholic Primary School	Butler	Wanneroo	2003	
St Gerard's Primary School	Westminster	Stirling	1965	
St Helena's Catholic Primary School	Ellenbrook	Swan	1999	
St Jerome's Primary School	Munster	Cockburn	1935	
St John Paul II Catholic Primary School	Banksia Grove	Wanneroo	2004	
St John's School	Scarborough	Stirling	1948	
St Joseph's School	Queens Park	Canning	1936	
St Jude's School	Langford	Gosnells	1979	
St Kieran Catholic Primary School	Tuart Hill	Stirling	1920	Relocated in 1952
St Lawrence Primary School	Balcatta	Stirling	1960	
St Luke's Catholic Primary School	Woodvale	Joondalup	1989	
St Maria Goretti's Catholic Primary School	Redcliffe	Belmont	1956	
St Michael's Primary School	Bassendean	Bassendean	1914	Formerly St Joseph's
St Munchin's Primary School	Gosnells	Gosnells	1952	Relocated in 1978
St Patrick's Primary School	Fremantle	Fremantle	1855	Relocated from Parry St in 1968
St Paul's Primary School	Mount Lawley	Stirling	1929	Originally a Montessori school
St Peter's Primary School	Inglewood	Stirling	1941	
St Pius X Primary School	Manning	South Perth	1957	
St Simon Peter Catholic Primary School	Ocean Reef	Joondalup	1988	
St Thomas' Primary School	Claremont	Claremont	1909	
St Vincent's Primary School	Parmelia	Kwinana	1956	Relocated from Medina in 2004
Star of the Sea Primary School	Rockingham	Rockingham	1950	Relocated in 1972; formerly Sacred Heart PS
Whitford Catholic Primary School	Craigie	Joondalup	1978	
Xavier Primary School	Brookdale	Armadale		

=== Catholic K–12 and high schools ===
Name	Suburb	LGA	Category	M/F/Co-ed	Opened	Notes
Aquinas College	Salter Point	South Perth	Catholic	M	1938	
Aranmore Catholic College	Leederville	Vincent	Catholic	Co-ed	1903	
CBC Fremantle	Fremantle	Fremantle	Catholic	M	1882	
Chisholm Catholic College	Bedford	Bayswater	Catholic	Co-ed	1989	
Clontarf Aboriginal College	Waterford	South Perth	Catholic	Co-ed		
Corpus Christi College	Bateman	Melville	Catholic	Co-ed	1983	
Divine Mercy College	Yangebup	Cockburn	Catholic	Co-ed	1996	
Emmanuel Catholic College	Success	Cockburn	Catholic	Co-ed	1999	
Holy Cross College	Ellenbrook	Swan	Catholic	Co-ed	2010	
Iona Presentation College	Mosman Park	Mosman Park	Catholic	F/Co-ed	1900	
Irene McCormack Catholic College	Butler	Wanneroo	Catholic	Co-ed	2007	
John XXIII College	Mount Claremont	Nedlands	Catholic	Co-ed	1977	Relocated in 1986
Kolbe Catholic College	Rockingham	Rockingham	Catholic	Co-ed	1989	
La Salle College	Middle Swan	Swan	Catholic	Co-ed	1954	Co-educational from 1974; formerly named De La Salle College Midland
Lumen Christi College	Martin	Gosnells	Catholic	Co-ed	1984	
Mater Dei Catholic College	Edgewater	Joondalup	Catholic	Co-ed	1993	
Mazenod College	Lesmurdie	Kalamunda	Catholic	M	1966	
Mercedes College	East Perth	Perth	Catholic	F	1846	
Mercy College	Koondoola	Wanneroo	Catholic	Co-ed	1972	
Mother Teresa Catholic College	Baldivis	Rockingham	Catholic	Co-ed	2014	
Newman College	Churchlands	Stirling	Catholic	Co-ed	1977	
Prendiville Catholic College	Ocean Reef	Joondalup	Catholic	Co-ed	1985	
Sacred Heart College	Sorrento	Joondalup	Catholic	Co-ed	1967	
Salvado Catholic College	Byford	Serpentine-Jarrahdale	Catholic	Co-ed	2018	
Santa Maria College	Attadale	Melville	Catholic	F	1938	
Servite College	Tuart Hill	Stirling	Catholic	Co-ed	1958	Formerly St Phillip's HS
Seton Catholic College	Samson	Fremantle	Catholic	Co-ed	1990	
St Brigid's College	Lesmurdie	Kalamunda	Catholic	F/Co-ed	1929	
St. Clare's School	Lathlain	Victoria Park	Catholic	F	1967	Specialist support
St Francis' School	Maddington	Gosnells	Catholic	Co-ed	1967	Alternative
St John Bosco College	Piara Waters	Armadale	Catholic	Co-ed	2015	
St. Norbert College	Queens Park	Canning	Catholic	Co-ed	1965	
Trinity College	East Perth	Perth	Catholic	M	1961	
Ursula Frayne Catholic College	Victoria Park	Victoria Park	Catholic	Co-ed	1990	

=== Independent schools ===
Independent schools (officially referred to as "non-systemic schools" in Part 4 of the School Education Act 1999) comprise those which are outside the State or Catholic systems. These schools are officially registered by the Minister based on formal advice from the chief executive officer of the Department of Education and Training, following an application by the governing body of the school at least six months in advance of the school's opening. It is an offence in Western Australia to run an unregistered school, under Section 154 of the Act. Under the previous Act (Education Act 1928), a school could commence first but had to apply within one month for "efficient" status, which would be granted by the Minister after inspection and a comprehensive audit by the Department (Section 32A).

Name	Suburb	LGA	Category	M/F/Co-ed	Opened	Notes
Al-Ameen College	Langford	Gosnells	Islamic	Co-ed	2008	Formerly Langford Islamic College
Al-Hidayah Islamic School	Bentley	Canning	Islamic	Co-ed	1994	
Alkimos Baptist College	Merriwa	Wanneroo	Baptist	Co-ed	2011	
All Saints' College	Bull Creek	Melville	Anglican	Co-ed	1981	
ALTA-1	Landsdale	Wanneroo	Christian (CSA)	Co-ed	2004	Alternative
Atlantis Beach Baptist College	Two Rocks	Wanneroo	Baptist	Co-ed	2016	
Australian Christian College (Darling Downs)	Brookdale	Armadale	Adventist	Co-ed	1982	Armadale 7DA Primary School until Sep 2007; Brookdale Adventist until late 2011
Australian Islamic College	Kewdale	Belmont	Islamic	Co-ed	1986	Relocated in 2000
Australian Islamic College	Dianella	Stirling	Islamic	Co-ed	1996	
Australian Islamic College	Thornlie	Gosnells	Islamic	Co-ed	1990	
Banksia Montessori School	Dianella	Stirling	Montessori	Co-ed		
Beechboro Christian School	Beechboro	Swan	Christian (SCEA)	Co-ed	1991	
Beehive Montessori School	Mosman Park	Mosman Park	Montessori	Co-ed	1977	
Blue Gum Montessori School	Bibra Lake	Cockburn	Montessori	Co-ed	1983	
Bold Park Community School	Wembley	Cambridge	Independent	Co-ed	1991	
Byford John Calvin School	Byford	Serpentine-Jarrahdale	Free Reformed	Co-ed	1999	
Carey Baptist College	Harrisdale	Armadale	Baptist	Co-ed	1998	Forrestdale campus opened 2016
Carmel Adventist College	Carmel	Kalamunda	Adventist	Co-ed	1907	
Carmel Adventist College Primary	Bickley	Kalamunda	Adventist	Co-ed	1907	
Carmel School	Dianella	Stirling	Jewish	Co-ed	1959	
Casa Mia Montessori Community School	Bassendean	Bassendean	Montessori	Co-ed	1999	
Christ Church Grammar School	Claremont	Claremont	Anglican	M	1910	
Chrysalis Montessori School	Glendalough	Stirling	Montessori	Co-ed	1990	
Communicare Academy	Kenwick	Gosnells	Alternative	Co-ed		
Court Grammar School	Mundijong	Serpentine-Jarrahdale	Anglican	Co-ed	2006	Formerly Serpentine-Jarrahdale Grammar School
Dale Christian School	Armadale	Armadale	Christian (CSA)	Co-ed	1983	
Ellenbrook Christian College	Ellenbrook	Swan	Christian (SCEA)	Co-ed	2001	
Emmanuel Christian Community School	Girrawheen	Wanneroo	Christian (CSA)	Co-ed	1982	
Eton Farm Primary School	Dayton	Swan	Independent	Co-ed		
Fountain College	Ferndale	Canning	Independent	Co-ed	2006	
Fremantle Christian College	Hamilton Hill	Cockburn	Christian (CSA)	Co-ed	1989	Formerly Calvary CS until 2003, New Life CC until 2013
Guildford Grammar School	Guildford	Swan	Anglican	Co-ed	1896	
Hale School	Wembley Downs	Stirling	Anglican	M	1858	
Havenport MSL College	Cockburn Central	Cockburn	Special	Co-ed		
Helena College	Glen Forrest	Mundaring	Independent	Co-ed	1921	Formerly Helena School in Cottesloe
Helena River Steiner School	Midland		Steiner	Co-ed	2018	
Heritage College	Forrestfield	Kalamunda	Christadelphian	Co-ed	2006	
Hensman Street Elementary	South Perth	South Perth	Independent	Co-ed		
Hillside Christian College	Forrestfield	Kalamunda	Christian (CSA)	Co-ed	1978	Formerly Forrestfield CS
Indie School Western Australia	Midland		Special	Co-ed		
International School of Western Australia	City Beach	Cambridge	International	Co-ed	2007	
John Calvin Christian College	Armadale	Armadale	Free Reformed	Co-ed	1957	
John Septimus Roe Anglican Community School	Mirrabooka	Stirling	Anglican (ACS)	Co-ed	1990	
John Wollaston Anglican Community School	Camillo	Armadale	Anglican (ACS)	Co-ed	1989	
Kalamunda Christian School	Walliston	Kalamunda	Christian (SCEA)	Co-ed	1984	
Kelmscott John Calvin School	Champion Lakes	Armadale	Free Reformed	Co-ed	1983	
Kennedy Baptist College	Murdoch	Melville	Baptist	Co-ed	2013	Merger of Somerville and Winthrop Colleges
Kerry Street Community School	Hamilton Hill	Cockburn	Independent	Co-ed	1980	Formerly Fremantle Alternative School
Kingsway Christian College	Darch	Wanneroo	Christian	Co-ed	1983	Formerly Northern Districts CC until 1989
Lake Joondalup Baptist College	Joondalup	Joondalup	Baptist	Co-ed	1990	
Lance Holt School	Fremantle	Fremantle	Independent	Co-ed	1970	
Landsdale Christian School	Landsdale	Wanneroo	Adventist	Co-ed	1987	Landsdale Gardens Adventist until 2016
Living Waters Lutheran College	Warnbro	Rockingham	Lutheran	Co-ed	1997	
Methodist Ladies' College	Claremont	Claremont	Uniting	F	1907	
Moerlina School	Mount Claremont	Nedlands	Independent	Co-ed	1974	Formerly part of Lance Holt School
Mundaring Christian College	Mundaring	Mundaring	Christian (SCEA)	Co-ed	1988	
Northshore Christian Grammar School	Alkimos	Wanneroo	Christian (SCEA)	Co-ed	2017	
Oneschool Global WA	Willetton	Canning	Exclusive Brethren	Co-ed		Formerly Woodthorpe School
Penrhos College	Como	South Perth	Uniting	F	1940	Formerly St Anne's College until 1952
Perth College	Mount Lawley	Stirling	Anglican	F	1902	
Perth Montessori School	Burswood	Victoria Park	Montessori	Co-ed	1980	
Perth Waldorf School	Bibra Lake	Cockburn	Waldorf/Steiner	Co-ed	1983	
Peter Carnley Anglican Community School	Wellard	Kwinana	Anglican (ACS)	Co-ed	2007	
Peter Moyes Anglican Community School	Mindarie	Wanneroo	Anglican (ACS)	Co-ed	2000	
Pioneer Village School	Armadale	Armadale	Independent	Co-ed	1983	
Port School	Hamilton Hill	Cockburn	Independent	Co-ed		Special/Alternative
Presbyterian Ladies' College	Peppermint Grove	Peppermint Grove	Uniting	F	1915	
Providence Christian College	Southern River	Gosnells	Christian	Co-ed	1984	Formerly Thornlie Christian College
Quinns Baptist College	Mindarie	Wanneroo	Baptist	Co-ed	1996	
Quintillian School	Mount Claremont	Nedlands	Independent	Co-ed	1975	Relocated in 1992
Regent College	Victoria Park	Victoria Park	Christian (Riverview)	Co-ed	1981	K–10 until 1994
Rehoboth Christian College	Kenwick	Gosnells	Christian	Co-ed	1977	Relocated in 1979; 8–12 until 2005; formerly Rehoboth Christian High School
Rockingham John Calvin School	Baldivis	Rockingham	Free Reformed	Co-ed	1995	
Rockingham Montessori School	Rockingham	Rockingham	Montessori	Co-ed	1988	Formerly Rockingham Family School
Scotch College	Swanbourne	Nedlands	Uniting	M	1897	
Seda College WA	Fremantle	Fremantle	Independent	Co-ed		
Smyl Community College	Rockingham	Rockingham		Co-ed		
South Coast Baptist College	Waikiki	Rockingham	Christian (CSA)	Co-ed	1985	Formerly Maranatha Christian College
Southern Hills Christian College	Bedfordale	Armadale	Christian (SCEA)	Co-ed	1980	Formerly "Armadale Christian College" and "Emmaus"
Sowilo Community High School	Wilson	Canning	Alternative	Co-ed	2001	
St Andrew's Grammar School	Dianella	Stirling	Greek Orthodox	Co-ed	1991	
St George's Anglican Grammar School	Perth	Perth	Anglican	Co-ed	2015	Moved from Murdoch College
St Hilda's Anglican School for Girls	Mosman Park	Mosman Park	Anglican	F	1896	
St James' Anglican School	Alkimos	Wanneroo	Anglican	Co-ed	2015	
St. Mark's Anglican Community School	Hillarys	Joondalup	Anglican (ACS)	Co-ed	1986	
St Mary's Anglican Girls' School	Karrinyup	Stirling	Anglican	F	1921	
St Stephen's School	Duncraig / Tapping	Joondalup / Wanneroo	Uniting	Co-ed	1982	
Swan Christian College	Middle Swan	Swan	Christian (SCEA)	Co-ed	1983	
Swan Valley Anglican Community School	Aveley	Swan	Anglican (ACS)	Co-ed	2006	
Taylors College (Perth Campus)	Claremont	Claremont	Independent	Co-ed	2006	
Telethon Speech and Hearing Centre	Wembley	Cambridge	Special	Co-ed	1967	
The Japanese School In Perth	City Beach	Cambridge	International	Co-ed		
The King's College	Wellard	Kwinana	Christian (CSA)	Co-ed	1986	Formerly El Shaddai CS
The Montessori School	Kingsley	Joondalup	Montessori	Co-ed	1962	
The Silver Tree Steiner School	Parkerville	Mundaring	Steiner	Co-ed	1996	
The Studio School	Fremantle	Fremantle	Alternative	Co-ed	2021	
Tranby College	Baldivis	Rockingham	Uniting	Co-ed	1997	
Treetops Montessori School	Darlington	Mundaring	Montessori	Co-ed	1972	Originally a Lance Holt School; formerly Hills Family School to 1989
Victoria Park Christian School	Victoria Park	Victoria Park	Christian	Co-ed		
Wesley College	South Perth	South Perth	Uniting	Co-ed/M	1923	Co-ed K-6, Boys 7-12
West Coast Steiner School	Nollamara	Stirling	Steiner	Co-ed		
Youth Futures Community School	Midland	Swan	Independent	Co-ed	1978	Alternative; relocated in 1998; formerly Foothills School (Guildford), Then Corridors College

=== Defunct private schools ===
Name	Suburb	LGA	Category	Opened	Closed	Notes
Aboriginal Community College	Gnangara	Wanneroo	Independent	1979	2007	ABC story
Ananda Marga School	Perth	Perth	Ananda Marga	1978	1979	
Australian College of Applied Education	Perth	Perth	Hotel school	1989	2017	
Australian Trades College (Perth South)	Armadale	Armadale	Vocational	2010		
Australian Trades College (Perth South)	Maddington	Gosnells	Vocational	2008		
Bible Baptist Christian Academy	Mount Helena	Mundaring	Baptist	1985		
Brigidine College	Floreat	Cambridge	Catholic girls'	1943	1977	Amalgamated into Newman College
Christian Brothers College	Highgate	Vincent	Catholic boys'	1936	1989	Merged into Chisholm Catholic College
Christian Brothers College	Leederville	Vincent	Catholic boys'	1942	1986	Merged into Aranmore Catholic College
Christian Brothers College	Perth	Perth	Catholic boys'	1894	1961	Boarding school and some day boarders moved to Aquinas College in 1938; college relocated and became Trinity College in 1962
Corpus Christi Primary School	Myaree	Melville	Catholic	1964	1972	Amalgamated into Mel Maria PS
Cottesloe High School	Peppermint Grove	Peppermint Grove	Independent girls'	1900	1937	
Damla College	Ferndale	Canning	Independent (Turkish)	2006		
De Vialar College	Hilton	Fremantle	Catholic	1968	1989	Amalgamated into Seton Catholic College
Gumnut Montessori School	Claremont	Claremont	Montessori	1987	2009	
Holy Cross School	Kensington	South Perth	Catholic	1938	1972	
Holy Family Primary School	Como	South Perth	Catholic	1954	1975	
Holy Name School	Carlisle	Victoria Park	Catholic	1938	2010	Amalgamated with Notre Dame, Cloverdale
KIDS Open Learning School	Maylands	Bayswater	non-denominational	1975	2016	All Buildings and Assets have been gifted to Bold Park Community School
Kingston International College	Perth	Perth	International			
Kwinana Christian School	Calista	Kwinana	Christian	2002	2015	
Loreto Convent School	Claremont	Claremont	Catholic girls'	1897	1976	Amalgamated into John XXIII College
Loreto Nedlands Primary School	Nedlands	Nedlands	Catholic	1931	2023	
Marist Junior College	Wembley	Cambridge	Catholic boys'	1954	1977	Formerly St. Joseph's; amalgamated into Newman College
Marist Senior College	Churchlands	Stirling	Catholic boys'	1965	1976	Amalgamated into Newman College
Mater Gratiae Primary School	Pickering Brook	Kalamunda	Catholic	1955	1969	
Midland Christian School	Middle Swan	Swan	Christian (SCEA)	1981	2009	Amalgamated into Swan Christian College
Murdoch College	Murdoch	Melville	Independent	2000	2014	Moved to St George's Anglican Grammar School
Nollamara Christian Academy	Nollamara	Stirling	Baptist	1979	2016	
Northside Christian School	Beechboro	Swan	Christian (CSA)	1981	1989	Failed; assets transferred to John Septimus Roe Anglican Community School
Oberon School	North Perth	Vincent		1975	1986	
Our Lady Help of Christians Primary School	East Victoria Park	Victoria Park	Catholic	1936	1980	Amalgamated into Xavier College
Our Lady Queen of Peace Primary School	Willagee	Melville	Catholic	195?	1972	Amalgamated into Mel Maria PS
Phoenix Academy	Fremantle	Fremantle	International	1989	2014	Became a tertiary institution.
Ponderosa School	Armadale	Armadale	Independent	1982	1994	
Raith Girls' Grammar School	South Perth	South Perth	Anglican	1918	1940	Moved premises and became St Anne's College
Riverlands School	West Swan	Swan	Montessori	1991		
Riverside Community School	Victoria Park	Victoria Park	Adventist	1927		
Siena College	Doubleview	Stirling	Catholic girls'	1962	1977	Amalgamated into Newman College
Smyl Community College	Rockingham	Rockingham	Independent			
Somerville Baptist College	Murdoch	Melville	Baptist	1999	2012	Amalgamated into Kennedy Baptist College
St. Bernadette's Primary School	Glendalough	Stirling	Catholic	1959	1978	
St. Brendan's College	Hilton	Fremantle	Catholic	1964	1989	Amalgamated into Seton Catholic College
St. Brigid's College	West Perth	Perth	Catholic	1888	1971	
St. Francis Xavier High School	East Victoria Park	Victoria Park	Catholic	1953	1980	Amalgamated into Xavier College
St. Joachim's High School	Victoria Park	Victoria Park	Catholic	1926	1989	Amalgamated into Ursula Frayne Catholic College; "Our Lady of Mercy" until 1955
St. Joachim's Primary School	Victoria Park	Victoria Park	Catholic	1901	1989	Amalgamated into Ursula Frayne Catholic College
St. Joseph Pignatelli Primary School	Attadale	Melville	Catholic	1954	1972	Amalgamated into Mel Maria PS
St. Joseph's High School (Adelaide St)	Fremantle	Fremantle	Catholic	1913	1967	Relocated and renamed De Vialar College
St. Louis School	Claremont	Claremont	Catholic	1938	1976	Amalgamated into John XXIII College
St. Mark's College	Bedford	Bayswater	Catholic boys'	1959	1989	Formerly Christian Brothers HS until 1972; merged into Chisholm Catholic College
St. Mary's College	Leederville	Vincent	Catholic girls'	1942	1986	Merged into Aranmore Catholic College
St. Thomas Aquinas College	Bedford	Bayswater	Catholic girls'	1941	1989	Merged into Chisholm Catholic College
WA International College	Joondalup	Joondalup	International	1991	2005	
West Coast College	West Perth	Perth	Christian	1989	1990	
Winthrop Baptist College	Murdoch	Melville	Baptist	1994	2012	Amalgamated into Kennedy Baptist College
Woodbridge House Preparatory School	Guildford	Swan	Anglican boys'	1921	1942	Amalgamated into Guildford Grammar School
Xavier College	East Victoria Park	Victoria Park	Catholic	1981	1989	Amalgamated into Ursula Frayne Catholic College
Yanchep Community School	Two Rocks	Wanneroo	Independent	1977	1981	
Yidarra Catholic Primary School	Bateman	Melville	Catholic	1985	2021	Merged into Corpus Christi College

== Largest schools ==
The largest schools in Perth by number of students, as of 2025, are as follows.

Primary schools

1. Piara Waters Primary School
2. Aspiri Primary School
3. Harrisdale Primary School
4. Oakwood Primary School
5. Brabham Primary School
6. Caladenia Primary School
7. Highgate Primary School
8. Mount Hawthorn Primary School
9. Aubin Grove Primary School
10. Wellard Primary School

High schools

1. Rossmoyne Senior High School
2. Shenton College
3. Willetton Senior High School
4. Carine Senior High School
5. Harrisdale Senior High School
6. Churchlands Senior High School
7. Mount Lawley Senior High School
8. Applecross Senior High School
9. Comet Bay College
10. Duncraig Senior High School

== See also ==
- Lists of schools in Australia
