= Ballajura Community College =

School in Perth, Western Australia

Location
- Ballajura, Perth, Western Australia; Australia; 31°50′40″S 115°53′43″E

Information
- Type: Public co-educational high day school
- Established: 1995; 31 years ago
- Educational authority: WA Department of Education
- Principal: Belinda Hall
- Years: 7–12
- Enrolment: 1,128 (2021)
- Campus type: Suburban
- Website: www.bcc.wa.edu.au

Ballajura Community College is a public co-educational high day school, located on Illawarra Crescent in the suburb of Ballajura, 14 kilometres (8.7 mi) north of Perth, Western Australia. Established in 1995, the school caters for students from Year 7 to Year 12.

== History ==
Ballajura Community College started operating in 1995, with an initial enrolment of 650 students.

== See also ==
- List of schools in the Perth metropolitan area
