= Safety Bay Senior High School =

Public high school in Western Australia

Location
- Malibu Road, Safety Bay, Western Australia; Australia; 32°18′11″S 115°44′26″E

Information
- Type: Public co-educational high day school
- Motto: Imagine Believe Achieve
- Established: 1978; 48 years ago
- Educational authority: WA Department of Education
- Principal: Jessica Halliday
- Years: 7–12
- Enrolment: 1174 (2025)
- Campus type: Suburban
- Colours: Navy blue and teal
- Website: safetybay.wa.edu.au

Safety Bay Senior High School is a public co-educational high day school in the southern Perth suburb of Safety Bay, Western Australia, on Malibu Road, approximately 60 kilometres (37 mi) south of the Perth central business district.

The school was established in 1978 and caters for students from Year 7 to Year 12. The school consists of a middle school for Years 7, 8 and 9 students and a senior school for Years 10, 11 and 12 students.

Total enrolments at the school have declined from 1,177 in 2009, to 1,021 in 2010, 978 in 2011, 954 in 2012 and then increased to 1,000 in 2013.

== See also ==
- List of schools in the Perth metropolitan area
