= Swan View Senior High School =

- Swan View Senior High School in September, 2026

Location
- Gladstone Avenue, Swan View, Perth, Western Australia; Australia; 31°53′17″S 116°02′37″E

Information
- Type: Independent public co-educational high day school
- Established: 1977; 49 years ago
- School district: North Metropolitan Education Region
- Educational authority: WA Department of Education
- Principal: George Sekulla
- Years: 7–12
- Enrolment: 582 (2017)
- Colours: Junior school (Year 7–9): Emerald green and black; Senior school (Year 10–12): Ash grey and black
- Website: www.svshs.wa.edu.au

Swan View Senior High School is an independent public co-educational high day school, located in Swan View, Western Australia. The school is located within the North Metropolitan Education Region school district, a district of the WA Department of Education.

Established in 1977, the school provides education for approximately 580 students from Year 7 to Year 12.

== See also ==
- List of schools in the Perth metropolitan area
