= Carmel Adventist College =

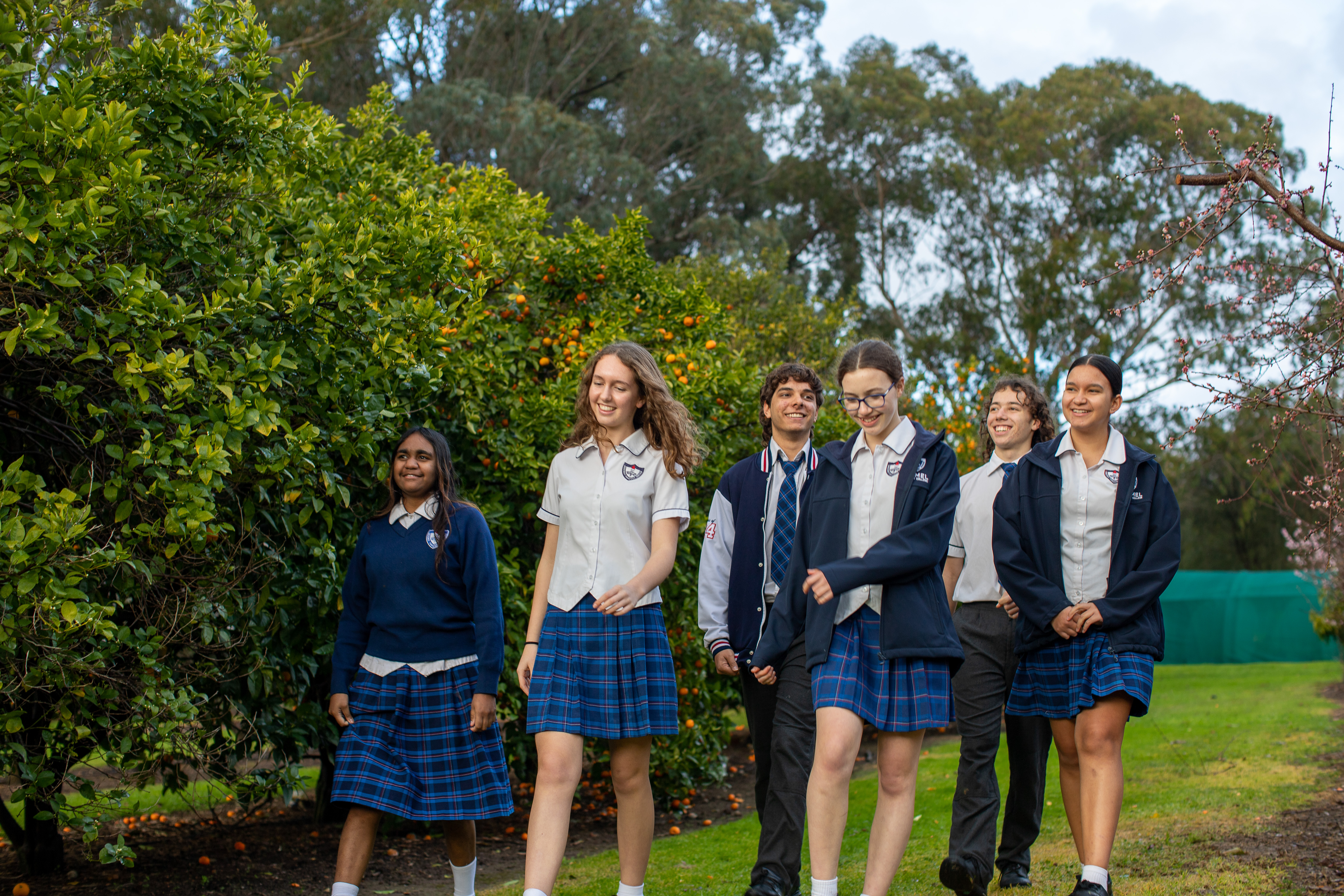

Information
- Former name: Darling Range School
- Type: Independent co-educational early learning, primary and secondary day school
- Motto: Greatness through service
- Religious affiliation: Australian Union Conference of Seventh-day Adventists
- Denomination: Seventh-day Adventist
- Established: 1907; 119 years ago
- Authority: Adventist Christian Schools Western Australia
- Principal (Secondary Campus): Brad Flynn
- Deputy Principal (Secondary Campus): Jessica Foster
- Director of Studies (Secondary Campus): Amanda Lobegeiger
- Principal (Early Learning & Primary Campus): Raeanne Fehlberg
- Principal (Early Learning & Primary Campus): Nicola Warchol
- Years: 3-year-old Kindy to Year 12
- Enrolment: 361 (2025)
- Campuses: Early Learning & Primary Campus (3-year-old Kindy to Year 6), Secondary Campus (Year 7 to Year 12)
- Campus type: Rural
- Colours: Blue, white and red
- Slogan: Bright minds. Big hearts.
- Website: www.carmelcollege.wa.edu.au

Carmel Adventist College is an independent Seventh-day Adventist co-educational early learning, primary and secondary day school located in the Perth suburbs of Carmel and Bickley, Western Australia, Australia. The College caters for students from 3-year-old Kindy to Year 12 and is open to any student who wishes to study and learn within a Christian environment. The College is part of the Seventh-day Adventist Church's worldwide educational system, the world's second-largest Christian school system.

== History ==
This school began as the Darling Range School on 12 January 1907. It was originally established to provide local education facilities for secondary students of Seventh-day Adventist families who would otherwise have had to go across the country to Avondale School in Cooranbong, a town about 120 kilometres (75 mi) north of Sydney, to receive their education.

Charles E Ashcroft, an early Seventh-day Adventist, offered to donate land for the proposed boarding school. The land was situated 27 kilometres (17 mi) east of Perth in the Heidelberg Valley (now Bickley Valley) in the Darling Range. Ashcroft's offer was accepted and work began immediately. Church members demonstrated their interest in the venture by contributing both time and money. The school opened 13 January 1907 with Harry R. Martin as Principal, and only two students. By the end of the first week the number had grown to five and by the close of the year to 14.

Since its modest beginning in 1907, the school has undergone many changes which culminated in the rebuilding of the main administrative-classroom block in 1977. The College estate was gradually enlarged until it totalled 55 hectares (140 acres), of which 9 hectares (22 acres) are in orchard, mainly stone fruits and citrus.

The school celebrated its centenary in 2007 and has continued to undergo renovations and changes to improve the appearance and ability to provide an excellent education to its students. This includes the removal of the majority of the property's orchards, allowing for a better view of the valley, the remodeling of the library with the addition of brand new computers and facilities, as well as the changes made to the school's academic and behavioural policies to allow for a difference in learning and discipline.

== See also ==
- Seventh-day Adventist education
- List of schools in the Perth metropolitan area
- List of Seventh-day Adventist secondary schools
