= Mercy College, Perth =

Mercy College
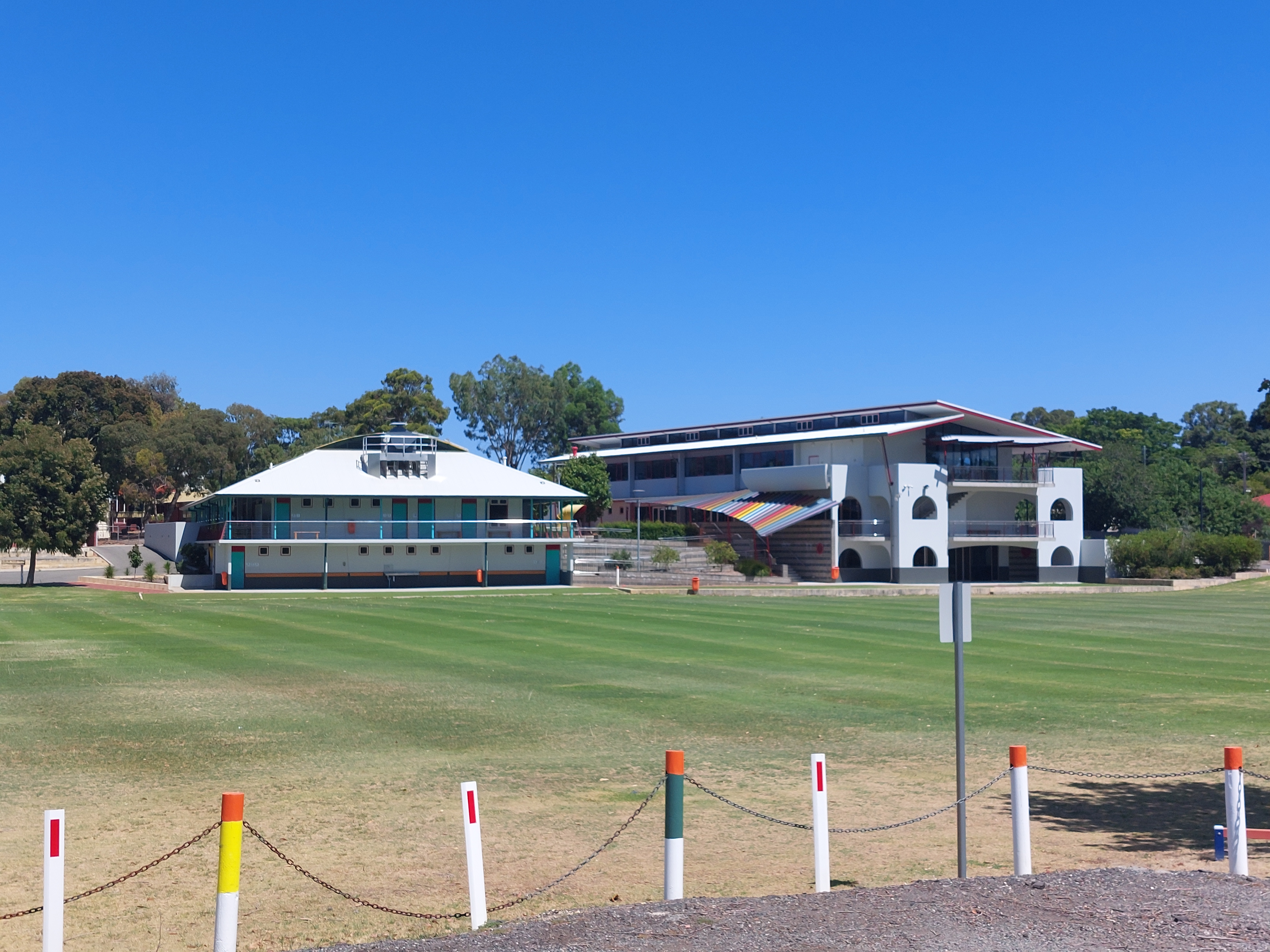
- East view of the Mercy College, Koondoola, Western Australia

Location
- Koondoola, Western Australia; Australia; 31°50′50″S 115°51′33″E

Information
- School type: Independent co-educational primary and high day school
- Motto: Latin: Misericordia (Love in action)
- Denomination: Roman Catholic
- Established: 1972; 54 years ago
- Principal: Kevin Sheehy
- Staff: c. 100
- Years: K–12
- Enrolment: c. 1,550
- Campus type: Suburban
- Colours: Blue, white & gold
- Website: www.mercy.wa.edu.au

Mercy College is an independent Roman Catholic co-educational primary and high day school located in the Perth suburb of Koondoola, Western Australia. Mercy College caters for 2000 students from kindergarten to Year 12. Mercy College draws on its history as a part of the journey of the Sisters of Mercy, founded by Catherine McAuley. The school was established by the Sisters of Mercy in 1972. The college's aim is to offer a Christian and general education which will provide for the spiritual, intellectual, physical, emotional and social needs of its students.

The principal is Kevin Sheehy.

== Overview ==
In January 1846 the first Sisters of Mercy arrived in the new colony promising to give their services to the poor, the sick and the uneducated. Within a few years they had built a convent, three schools and two orphanages - one for Aboriginal children.

In 1888, the sisters established St. Brigid's School in West Perth in an area of sand, scrub and bush. By 1896 there were about 500 pupils and in 1928 there were 40 Sisters of Mercy and 600 pupils. As the city and the suburbs grew and spread the sisters from West Perth began new schools at Leederville (Aranmore), Lesmurdie (St. Brigid's), Osborne Park (St Kieran) and Wanneroo. In 1969 the West Perth Sisters decided to leave West Perth as it was now a busy commercial area, and bought land in Koondoola. Mercy College was built in 1972 for girls in the northern suburbs, and St. Brigid's transferred directly to the new Mercy College as well.

The first students were all females and the first buildings are now part of the Junior Learning Centre on Mirrabooka Avenue. The school expanded rapidly from the first Year 8 - 10 classes in 1972. The primary school (Year 5) began in 1974. Mercy College is now a co-educational school spanning kindergarten to Year 12, and it enrols approximately 1,600 students and employs over 200 staff.

The College is separated into two different learning areas: the Primary, catering for students from kindergarten to Year 6 and the Secondary catering for students from Years 7 to 12.

== Notable alumni ==
- Antoni Grover, defender for the Fremantle Dockers

== See also ==
- List of schools in the Perth metropolitan area
