= Cyril Jackson Senior Campus =

School in Bassendean, Western Australia

Location
- 53 Reid Street; Bassendean, Western Australia; Australia; 31°54′49″S 115°56′34″E

Information
- Type: Independent public co-educational day school
- Opened: 1962; 64 years ago
- Educational authority: WA Department of Education
- Principal: Milton Butcher
- Years: 11–12
- Enrolment: 550 (2025)
- Campus type: Suburban
- Colour
- Website: cyriljackson.wa.edu.au

Cyril Jackson Senior Campus is an Independent Public senior secondary school in Bassendean, a suburb of Perth, Western Australia. It serves approximately 550 compulsory age and mature age students from Year 11 to Year 12.

== Overview ==
The surrounding area saw a large growth in population in the 1950s with the creation of a public housing estate in Ashfield. The school was established in 1961 or 1962 as a standard public secondary school, but only officially opened in 1964. It was named Cyril Jackson Senior High School, after Cyril Jackson, the inspector-general of schools in Western Australia in the 1890s. It was designed by Silver Fairbrother and Associates architects, and renamed to its current name around 1993.

Cyril Jackson Senior Campus has students from Year 11 to Year 12. It is one of two schools in Western Australia that offers secondary education to adult students, although it also has school-aged students. It accepts enrolments from all over Western Australia. It offers ATAR, General, Foundation, and Certificate level courses.

Cyril Jackson Senior Campus has a university-style environment, unique among Western Australian schools, with no uniform, no bell times, and teachers referred to by their first names. Among the types of students enrolled at Cyril Jackson are formerly homeschooled people who need a location to complete ATAR courses and VET certificates, or students who do not fit in at regular schools.

In 2011 and 2012, Governor Stirling Senior High School Year 11 and 12 students were co-located at Cyril Jackson Senior Campus whilst that school was being redeveloped.

== Student numbers ==
Year	Number
2016	420
2017	464
2018	481
2019	458
2020	453
2021	347
2022	309
2023	434
2024	533
2025	550

== Notable alumni ==
- Ian Britza, former Liberal Party politician for the electoral district of Morley

== See also ==
- List of schools in the Perth metropolitan area
