= Glenn Sterle =

Australian politician (born 1960)

Senator Glenn Sterle
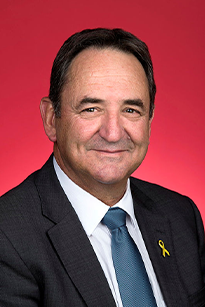

Senator for Western Australia
- Incumbent
- Assumed office 1 July 2005

Personal details
- Born: 3 January 1960 (age 66) Melbourne, Victoria, Australia
- Party: Labor (since 1991)
- Occupation: Union organiser
- Website: www.glennsterle.com.au

Glenn Sterle (born 3 January 1960) is an Australian politician. A former trade union organiser, he has been an Australian Labor Party member of the Australian Senate since 2005, representing the state of Western Australia.

== Early life ==
Sterle was born in Melbourne on 3 January 1960. His father was born in Yugoslavia and arrived in Australia as a refugee after World War II, while his mother was born in the United Kingdom.

Sterle grew up in the Perth suburb of Langford. He attended Thornlie Senior High School, but dropped out at the age of 17 to work as a furniture removalist. Three years later, he founded his own business operating road trains throughout northern Western Australia and the Northern Territory. He spent fourteen years working as an owner-operator before giving up his business to take on a position as an organiser with the Transport Workers Union (TWU) in 1991.

== Labour movement ==
Aside from working as a TWU organiser, Sterle served on his local branch committee, and was ultimately elected to the union's federal council in 1998, remaining in all three positions until his election to the Senate in 2004. His time with the union included a brief stint as acting state secretary in 1998 and an integral role in a major airline strike in the state in 2000. It was also during this period that Sterle received the Centenary Medal, in 2003, for services to training in the transport industry.

== Politics ==
Sterle's involvement with the union prompted him to join the Australian Labor Party in 1991, and in 1999, he was elected as a delegate to the party's state conference. He served as the ALP's transport policy convener in 2000, and was a delegate to the party's national conference in 2002 and 2004. He subsequently decided to make a bid to enter parliament, and in the lead-up to the 2004 federal election, challenged the preselection of veteran senator and former cabinet minister Peter Cook. Cook was determined to remain in parliament, but withdrew from the ballot of their shared Centre Faction when it became clear that Sterle had achieved enough support to win. As a result, Sterle gained the second position on the party's Senate ticket and was easily elected.

== Senate ==
Sterle's term began on 1 July 2005. He has served on a variety of Senate and joint-house committees, notably Rural and Regional Affairs, and Transport: Legislation and References. He served as a temporary Chair of Committees from 12 November 2013 to 9 May 2016.

Sterle was appointed Shadow Assistant Minister for Road Safety in Bill Shorten's shadow ministry in June 2018, and retained the position in the Anthony Albanese's shadow ministry after the 2019 election.
