= Thornlie Senior High School =

Location
- Thornlie, a suburb of Perth, Western Australia; Australia; 32°03′58″S 115°57′36″E

Information
- Type: Independent public co-educational high day school
- Motto: Engage Inspire Achieve
- Established: 1971; 55 years ago
- Educational authority: WA Department of Education
- Principal: Donna McDonald
- Staff: 104.5 (11 May 2024)
- Years: 7–12
- Enrolment: 1,095 (11 May 2024)
- Campus type: Suburban
- Website: www.thornlieshs.wa.edu.au

Thornlie Senior High School is an independent public co-educational high day school in the City of Gosnells, located off Ovens Road in the Perth suburb of Thornlie, Western Australia.

The school was established in 1971 and has 1,095 enrolled students as of 11 May 2024 from Year 7 to Year 12, although it has had enrolments as high as 1,200 students. It is located in the Canning educational district.

The school offers a specialist Rugby program. As well as preparing students for university—the school includes a comprehensive vocational education and training pathway for students in years 11 and 12.

In 2013, Prime Minister Julia Gillard held Community Cabinet at the high school. The event was booked out, and a small group of animal rights activists held a peaceful protest outside the event.

Enrolments at the school have been relatively stable at around 1,100 students. However, between 2009 and 2013 student numbers dropped below 1,000 due to changes in enrolment s.

== Academic rankings ==
In 2010 four students from the school were awarded Certificates of Excellence by the Curriculum Council of Western Australia and one student was awarded the University of Western Australia Fogarty Foundation award.

WA school ATAR ranking

| Year | Rank | Median ATAR | Eligible students | Students with ATAR | % students with ATAR |
|---|---|---|---|---|---|
| 2018 | 121 | 65.6 | 150 | 40 | 26.67 |
| 2017 | 140 | 59.70 | 139 | 38 | 27.34 |
| 2016 | 139 | 58.45 | 125 | 35 | 28.00 |

Year 12 student achievement data

| Year | Rank (Note: Ranking of school compared to other schools in the state) | % +75 in WACE (Note: Based on the number of Stage 3 course enrolments in the school where a WACE course score of 75 or above was achieved) | Rank | % +65 in WACE (Note: Based on the number of Stage 3 course enrolments in the school where a WACE course score of 65 or above was achieved) | % graduates (Note: Percentage of Year 12 cohort that graduated with a WACE certificate) |
|---|---|---|---|---|---|
| 2015 | >50 | <10.77 | >50 | <31.24 | 90.25 |
| 2014 | 42 | 11.39 | >50 | <32.41 | 96.15 |
| 2013 | >50 | <10.00 | >50 | <31.39 | 97.78 |
| 2012 | >50 | <9.88 | >50 | <33.55 | 96.40 |
| 2011 | >50 | <11.88 | >50 | <40.00 | 97.27 |
| 2010 | >50 | <10.69 | >50 | <43.40 | 85.82 |
| 2009 | >50 | <27.91 (>75% minimum of one subject) | >50 | <31.25 (64.6% or more) | 96.92 |

== Notable alumni ==
- Glenn Sterle – Australian Senator for Western Australia.
- Caitlin Parker – First Australian woman to receive a Bronze in women's Olympic boxing.
- Peter Bol – Two time Olympian in men's 800 metres.

== See also ==
- List of schools in the Perth metropolitan area
