= Yule Brook College =

School in Perth, Western Australia

Location
- Maddington, Perth, Western Australia; Australia; 32°02′54″S 116°00′31″E

Information
- Former name: Maddington Senior High School
- Type: Public co-educational middle day school
- Motto: One student at a time
- Established: 1978; 48 years ago
- Educational authority: WA Department of Education
- Principal: Stephen Jones
- Years: 7–12
- Enrolment: 324 (2025)
- Campus type: Suburban
- Website: www.yulebrookcollege.wa.edu.au

Yule Brook College is a public co-educational middle day school, located on Dellar Road in Maddington, a suburb of Perth, Western Australia.

== Overview ==
The college was initially established in 1978 as Maddington Senior High School, and renamed as Yule Brook College in 2000. It caters for students from Year 7 to Year 12.

The school's creation was a result of government restructuring education facilities in the south east metropolitan corridor. Two new middle schools, Yule Brook and Cannington Community College, were opened in 2000 and 2001 respectively. A new senior campus, Sevenoaks Senior College for Year 11 and 12 was also opened in the old Cannington Senior High School site. In 2023 Yule Brook College become a senior high school, adding year 11 and 12.

Enrolments at the school have been reasonably stable with around 250 students when Year 7 started intake at the school in 2015. Yule Brook College uses the Big Picture Education design, which focuses on "one student at a time".

== See also ==
- List of schools in the Perth metropolitan area
