= Aranmore =

Aranmore may refer to:

- Aranmore Catholic College, a school in Perth, Western Australia
- Arranmore, an island in County Donegal, Ireland
- Inishmore, the largest of the Aran Islands in County Galway, Ireland
