= Cannington Community College =

Location
- Cannington, Perth, Western Australia; Australia; 32°00′51″S 115°56′13″E

Information
- Type: Public co-educational primary and high school
- Motto: Advance Together
- Established: 2001; 25 years ago
- Educational authority: WA Department of Education
- Principal: Jo Stephens
- Years: Kindergarten–Year 10
- Enrolment: 829 (2023)
- Campus: Suburban
- Website: canningtoncc.wa.edu.au

Cannington Community College is a public co-educational primary and high school, located on Wharf Street in Cannington, a suburb of Perth, Western Australia.

== Overview ==
The school was initially established in 2001 and caters for students from Kindergarten to Year 10. The school's creation was a result of government restructuring education facilities in the south east metropolitan corridor. Two new middle schools, Cannington Community College and Yule Brook College, were opened in 2000 and 2001 respectively. A new senior campus, Sevenoaks Senior College for Year 11 and 12 was also opened on the old Cannington Senior High School site.

The school itself was formed from an amalgamation of Cannington Primary School and the lower secondary component of Cannington Senior High School.

The school draws students for the surrounding Primary schools; Gibbs Street, Queens Park and Beckenham.

In 2013 a fire burned through six classrooms in one of the main school buildings, two of the rooms will have to be demolished. The classrooms were used for children in Years one to four and the fire required 40 fire fighters to bring it under control.

== See also ==
- List of schools in the Perth metropolitan area
