= Sevenoaks Senior College =

School in Cannington, Western Australia

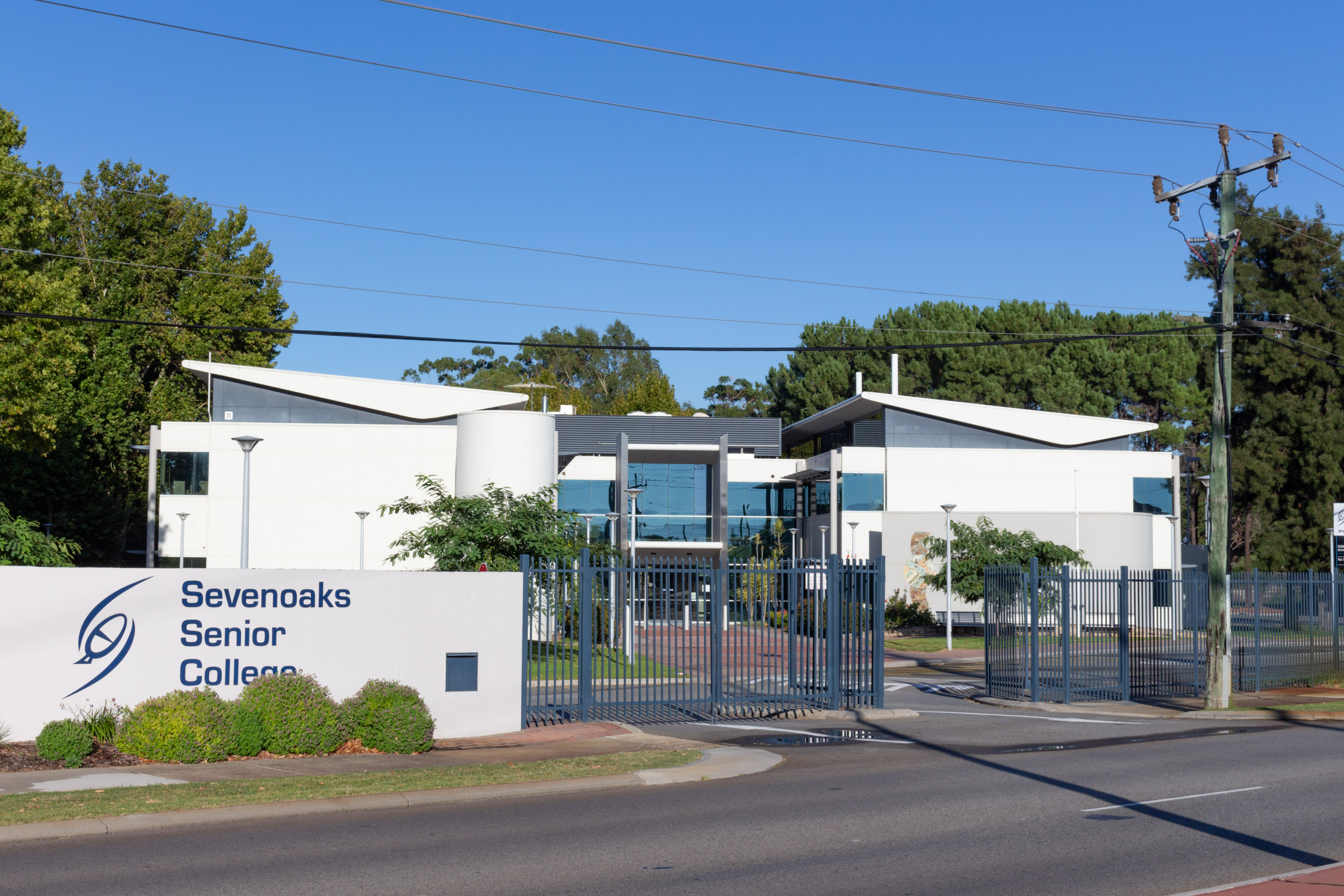
- Main entrance to the College, pictured in 2017

Location
- Cannington, Perth, Western Australia; Australia; 32°00′45″S 115°56′33″E

Information
- Type: Public co-educational high day school
- Motto: Find Your Future
- Established: 19 September 2001; 24 years ago
- Educational authority: WA Department of Education
- Principal: Karen Read
- Years: 11–12
- Enrolment: 469 (2013)
- Website: www.sevenoaks.wa.edu.au

Sevenoaks Senior College is a comprehensive public co-educational high day school, located in Cannington, 10 kilometres (6 mi) southeast of Perth, Western Australia, close to the Cannington railway station. Opened in 2001, the school is a senior secondary campus which accepts Year 11 and Year 12 students from the Perth metropolitan region.

== History ==
The school is sited on the grounds of what was formerly Cannington Senior High School, which was built in 1965 and existed until 2000. The decision was made to close Cannington and open two new schools—Cannington Community College (K–10) and Sevenoaks Senior College (Years 11 and 12). Sevenoaks cost A$8.6 million to build, and was formally opened on 19 September 2001 by Minister for Education Alan Carpenter, although it had been operating since the beginning of 2001. Students from Yule Brook College who continue to study after leaving Year 10 will attend Sevenoaks.

The inaugural principal of the school was David Wood who later headed up the Curriculum Council of Western Australia and the school had 450 foundation students.

Enrolments at the school have fluctuated from 464 in 2009 to 511 in 2010, 501 in 2011, 498 in 2012 and 469 in 2013.

== Teaching and learning ==
The school is based upon adult learning principles and has a focus on industry and community partnerships. Unlike most schools in the Western Australian school system, it is self-managing with its own College Board, with the Principal being accountable to the Director-General of the Department of Education and Training for the operation of the college.

== See also ==
- List of schools in the Perth metropolitan area
