= Balga Senior High School =

School in Perth, Western Australia

Location
- Balga, Western Australia; Australia; 31°51′08″S 115°50′48″E

Information
- Type: Public co-educational high school
- Motto: Strength in Unity
- Established: 1970; 56 years ago
- Educational authority: WA Department of Education
- Principal: Mark Carton
- Years: 7–12
- Enrolment: 433 (2013)
- Campus type: Suburban
- Colours: Blue and white
- Website: www.balgashs.wa.edu.au

Balga Senior High School is a public co-educational high school, located on Markham Way in the suburb of Balga, 13 kilometres (8.1 mi) north of Perth, Western Australia.

Established in 1970, the school caters for students from Year 7 to Year 12.

== Overview ==
A fire was deliberately lit at the school in 2002 causing $200,000 worth of damage.

Merv Hammond, the school principal from 1995 to 2006, was named Principal of the Year by the then education minister Alan Carpenter in 2002. Hammond later retired in 2006 following charges of 15 counts of corruption of A$400,000 of funds being embezzled in companies associated with the Balga Works Program for disadvantaged youth. These charges were later dropped, in 2009.

Enrolments in the school have remained fairly stable with 444 in 2007, 476 in 2008, 456 in 2009, 433 in 2010, 456 in 2011, 430 in 2012 and 433 in 2013.

In 2010, the school appeared at the bottom of the annual league tables, with only 55.17% of Year 12 students graduating. This was the lowest proportion of any school in the state.

== See also ==
- List of schools in the Perth metropolitan area
