= Australian College of Applied Education =

Former Australian hotel school

Coordinates: 31.9499°S 115.8537°E

- Former names: Australian School of Tourism and Hotel Management
- Type: Private
- Active: 1989; 37 years ago–2017; 9 years ago
- Parent institution: Careers Australia
- Location: Perth, Western Australia, Australia
- Campus: Urban

The Australian College of Applied Education (ACAE), previously the Australian School of Tourism and Hotel Management (ASTHM), was Australia's first private hotel school, established in 1989 in Perth. ACAE ran courses ranging from hospitality and cookery, to business, management and accounting.

ACAE's parent Careers Australia generated hundreds of millions of dollars in taxpayer funding for expensive training courses. Investigations by ABC television journalists revealed the company was targeting vulnerable students using door-to-door sales brokers offering "free" computers as inducements to enroll. When that sales tactic was banned by the Federal Government, Careers Australia moved to telemarketing, online competitions offering "free" iPads, and employment websites to obtain people's personal information without their knowledge. In April 2017 the Australian Government denied Careers Australia access to its vocational education scheme because of its poor track record, which included the company admitting to breaking consumer law. The business, including ACAE's Perth campus, was closed down on 25 May 2017.
