= Independent Public Schools =

Australian education initiative

Independent Public Schools (IPS) refers to an education reform first introduced in Western Australia in 2009 by the state's Department of Education. An independent public school is a state/public school that, while a part of the state education system, has been granted a higher degree of decision-making authority than a regular, non-independent state school. The term, Independent Public School, has been increasingly used by other state governments in Australia, such as Queensland, to label similar reforms to the governance of their state schools. Federal Australian governments also use the term Independent Public Schools. In February 2014 the Federal Education Minister, Christopher Pyne, announced a $70 million Independent Public Schools Initiative to support 1,500 state schools across Australia to become more autonomous.

== Western Australia ==
The Independent Public Schools (IPS) initiative was launched in Western Australia in 2009 by then Education Minister Dr Elizabeth Constable and the State Premier Colin Barnett. The Independent Public Schools initiative in Western Australia is an opt-in program, meaning schools choose to become an independent public school. In 2009, primary and secondary state schools were invited for the first time to express an interest in becoming an IP school through an application process administered by the Western Australian Department of Education. Applying schools need to demonstrate their readiness for increased autonomy and accountability through demonstrating the principal and school administration have prudent and effective financial and staff management ability. Schools should also demonstrate that there is a benefit to the school of becoming an IP school, and that the school staff and local community support the application. Applications are assessed by an independent panel. In its first round, 34 schools were admitted into the program. These schools began operating as IP schools in 2010. Since 2010, the following number of schools have been admitted into the program: 64 in 2011, 73 in 2012, and 84 in 2013. A further nine new schools opened as Independent Public Schools in 2014. Over half of all public schools have sought to become Independent Public Schools since the initiative began in 2010.

== Key features of IPS in Western Australia ==
Schools granted IPS status choose to opt into a number of "flexibilities" or "authorities". These include:

- the authority to recruit and appoint staff, including teachers, new graduates and support staff, thereby circumventing the central placement process administered by the department;
- the authority to determine a school's staffing profile and to create new job descriptions and positions;
- the authority to manage staff leave decisions and staff relief costs;
- the authority to determine a school's professional development priority and program;
- not being obliged to employ from the central recruitment pool, including redeployed staff;
- the authority to manage a one-line budget;
- the authority to award contracts and dispose of assets with values up to $150,000;
- the authority to manage school utilities and facilities (including electricity, gas, water and waste) and to retain savings;
- authority to determine curriculum to suit student needs.

Independent Public Schools are also awarded a recurring payment of between $25,000 - $50,000 for administrative support, and $20,000-$40,000 one-off payments for transition costs.

Independent Public Schools and their principals must:

- create and convene a School Board to oversee the principal's management of the school;
- create a business plan to guide the school for three years;
- produce an annual school report and annual self-assessment;
- be performance managed directly by the Department of Education Director-General. Principals are held accountable through a Delivery and Performance Agreement signed by the Principal, Chair of the School Board and Director-General. The Delivery and Performance Agreement identifies the resources and support the school will receive, programs the school will deliver, student achievement and how it will be monitored, and performance and accountability of the school;
- be subject to financial audits;
- determine and report on the satisfaction levels of students, staff and parents;
- respect the existing industrial platform of the Department of Education which determines staff salaries, wages and conditions;
- comply with relevant legislation, including School Education Act 1999, School Education Regulations 2000, and Public Sector Management Act 1994, and other Government and department policies and external agreements;
- comply with the mandated curriculum, as set out by the School Curriculum and Authority Act 1997.

An Independent Public School, its principal and board cannot:

- deny the enrolment of students who are eligible to attend their local school (a student who resides in the local area), although the school can enroll students from outside of the local area;
- charge an enrolment fee for students to attend (outside of fees applicable to all public schools);
- exclude students without following the requirements of the School Education Act 1999;
- appoint or dismiss the principal.

== Research and criticism ==
The Independent Public Schools initiative has been justified on the grounds that system decentralisation and principal autonomy improves the educational outcomes of students. A review of the Western Australian IPS initiative commissioned by the Department of Education (WA) was undertaken in 2013. This review found that principals welcomed the flexibilities offered by the program. There was no evidence of any change to attendance, suspension or academic achievement. The review noted that it was too early for the initiative to demonstrate an effect on student outcomes. A study in Victoria, Australia, following self-managing reforms in that state found no direct cause and effect between the decentralisation of decision-making in planning and resource allocation, and improved learning outcomes of students. A recent review of the literature into the effects of school autonomy concludes there is no causal link between autonomy and improved student learning outcomes, however local decision-making can improve learning outcomes in particular circumstances, such as where there are strong accountability mechanisms and a focus on improving the quality of teaching. The OECD has attempted to map the types and levels of autonomy across education systems, and to measure the impact of school autonomy on student performance. A comparison of the 2003 PISA results by the OECD concludes that different facets of school autonomy and accountability are associated with the level of student achievement - students perform better on average in schools with the authority to hire staff, but perform worse in schools with authority over formulating budgets. A comparison of the 2006 PISA results concludes that 'school level autonomy in relation to staffing, educational content and budgeting do not show a significant association with school performance. However, a system-level composition effect appears with regard to school autonomy in educational content as well as budgeting. Students in educational systems giving more autonomy to schools to choose textbooks, to determine course content, and to decide which courses to offer, tend to perform better regardless of whether the schools which individual students attend have higher degrees of autonomy or not'. A comparison of the 2012 PISA results concludes that school systems where schools have more autonomy over curricula and assessments tend to perform better overall, however the relationship between school autonomy and performance within countries is more complex, with factors such as accountability arrangements and teacher-principal collaboration in school management impacting on performance. Scholarly concern is registered about the effects of self-management and the deregulation of school choice that has accompanied it. These effects include: increased administrative burden on principals; levels of resourcing required to effectively self-govern; and the intensification of 'the gaps between schools serving the rich and those serving the poor, gaps marked by growing differences in school size, student intake, resources and achievement'. Other research explicitly situates IPS in its political and policy context. IPS has been criticised as a New Public Management reform not directed at improving the educational outcomes of students, but at reforming the public sector, particularly through introducing managerialist and market values, practices and mechanisms. IPS is also understood as a regulatory regime aligned with neoliberal modalities of governing. Using a Foucauldian theoretical approach to the IPS initiative, the rationalities, techniques and practices of IPS have been understood as transforming the identities of principals around the neoliberal norms of entrepreneurship, self-reliance and self-responsibility.
