= Thornlie, Western Australia =

Thornlie
- Suburb
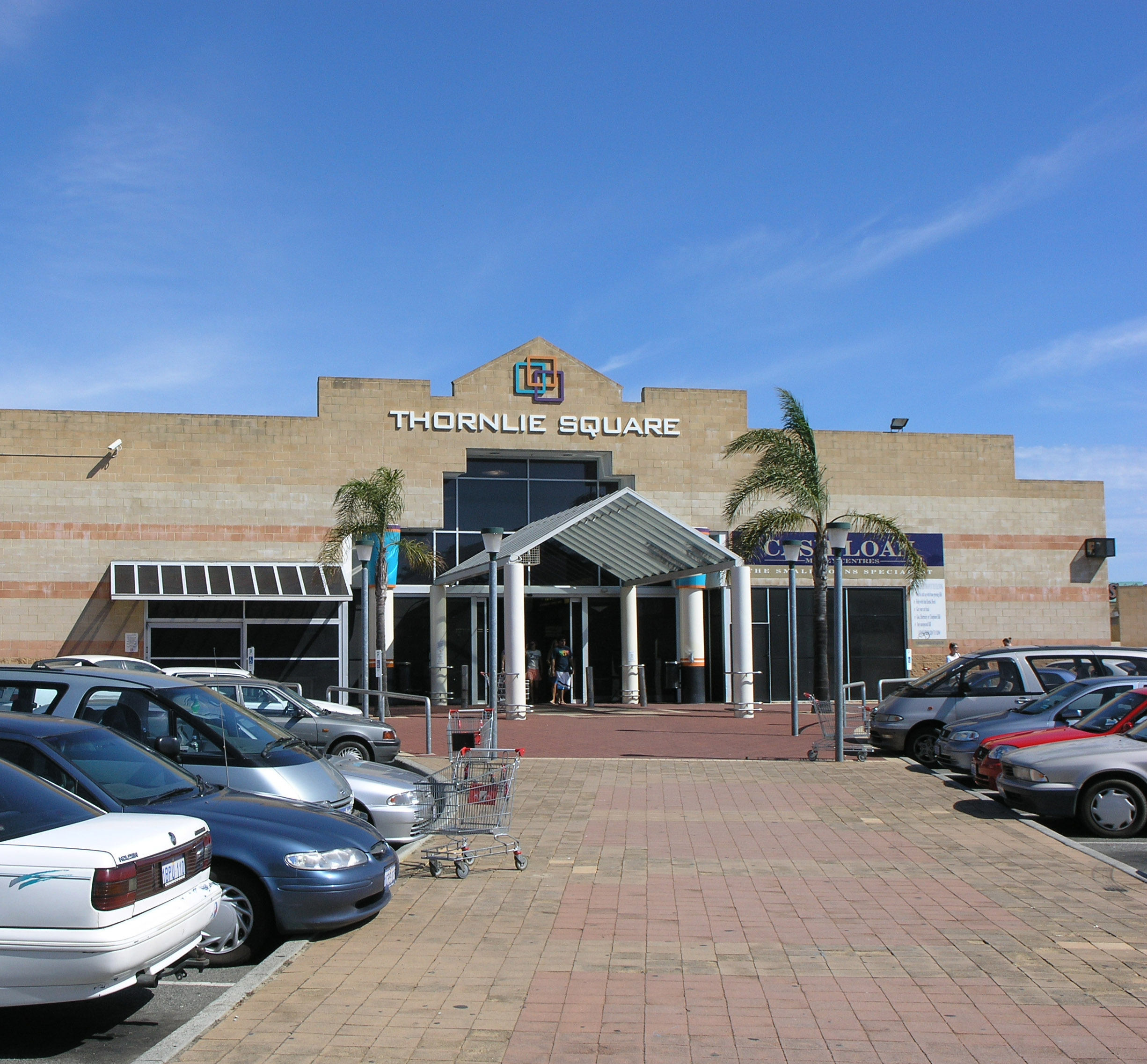
- Thornlie Square shopping centre
- Interactive map of Thornlie
- Coordinates: 32°03′36″S 115°57′18″E
- Country: Australia
- State: Western Australia
- City: Perth
- LGA: City of Gosnells
- Location: 15 km (9.3 mi) SSE of the Perth CBD
- Established: 1956

Government
  - State electorate: Gosnells, Cannington, Southern River
  - Federal division: Burt

Area
  - Total: 11.6 km^{2} (4.5 sq mi)

Population
  - Total: 23,665 (SAL 2021)
- Postcode: 6108
Suburbs around Thornlie
| Langford | Kenwick | Maddington |
| Parkwood | Thornlie | Gosnells |
| Canning Vale | Southern River | Huntingdale |

Thornlie is a large residential suburb of Perth, the capital city of Western Australia, located 15 kilometres (9.3 mi) south-east of the city's central business district. It is a part of the City of Gosnells local government area. The Canning River runs through the northern side of the suburb. Since the 1950s the suburb has developed in approximately five stages; north-east Thornlie (1950s–60s), south Thornlie (1970s–80s), Crestwood (1970s), Castle Glen (1980s) and Forest Lakes (1980s to present).

== History ==
Captain Peter Pégus was the original settler of the area now known as Thornlie, which he had called "Coleraine" when granted the land in 1829. Prior to this the area would have been used by the indigenous Noongar population. In 1834, Pégus' premises and belongings were burned in a fire that was to prove the end of his settlement.

The name Thornlie was derived from a farm "Thornlie Park", established in 1884 by Frank and Amy James, Amy being a niece of Walter Padbury, who financed the property.

The James family subsequently sold the estate, which had been a productive dairy farm, in 1937 to the mine-manager and investor, Nat Harper. When Harper died in 1954, the 694-hectare (1,715-acre) Thornlie estate was put up for auction in two lots. 92 hectares (228 acres) of Lot 1 were purchased by D. and M. O'Sullivan, and by June 1956 the Gosnells Roads Board had provided approval for the development of the area. By March 1957, 40 houses had been completed, and by May 1958 there were 100 occupied homes. Thornlie was thus established as a residential suburb in the late 1950s as a housing estate aimed mainly at middle-income earners and inner city dwellers.

The first homes in the area included a section of residences constructed in the 1950s and early 1960s, to the north of the intersection of Thornlie Avenue and Spencer Road, and residences to the south of Thornlie Avenue between Spencer Road and the Canning River, constructed in the 1960s and 1970s. During this time Thornlie's development was aimed at inner city dwellers who might want to live in a more spacious semi-urban-rural setting. It is one reason why Thornlie has typically large blocks of 700–900 square metres (7,500–9,700 sq ft) and is often described as one of Perth's leafy suburbs.

The more upmarket Crestwood Estate, which was an experiment in providing fully integrated facilities and services to home-owners, was established from the early 1970s in the southern part of Thornlie, an experiment that was rarely replicated in later Perth subdivisions. From the 1980s, the newer Castle Glen and Forest Lakes housing estates, which were at that time to some extent in competition with one another for land buyers, were established in the remaining land in the western and south-western portions of Thornlie. The focus of these developments was on providing affordable housing for new home buyers, generally young families.

Some semi-rural land in the western portion, mainly used for horse agistment and chicken-farming, was developed in the early 2000s. At one stage there were several industrial activities taking place in the north-western portion. The last of these to close, in about 2004, was the Inghams chicken-processing factory, the site of which was redeveloped for a residential estate.

== Facilities ==
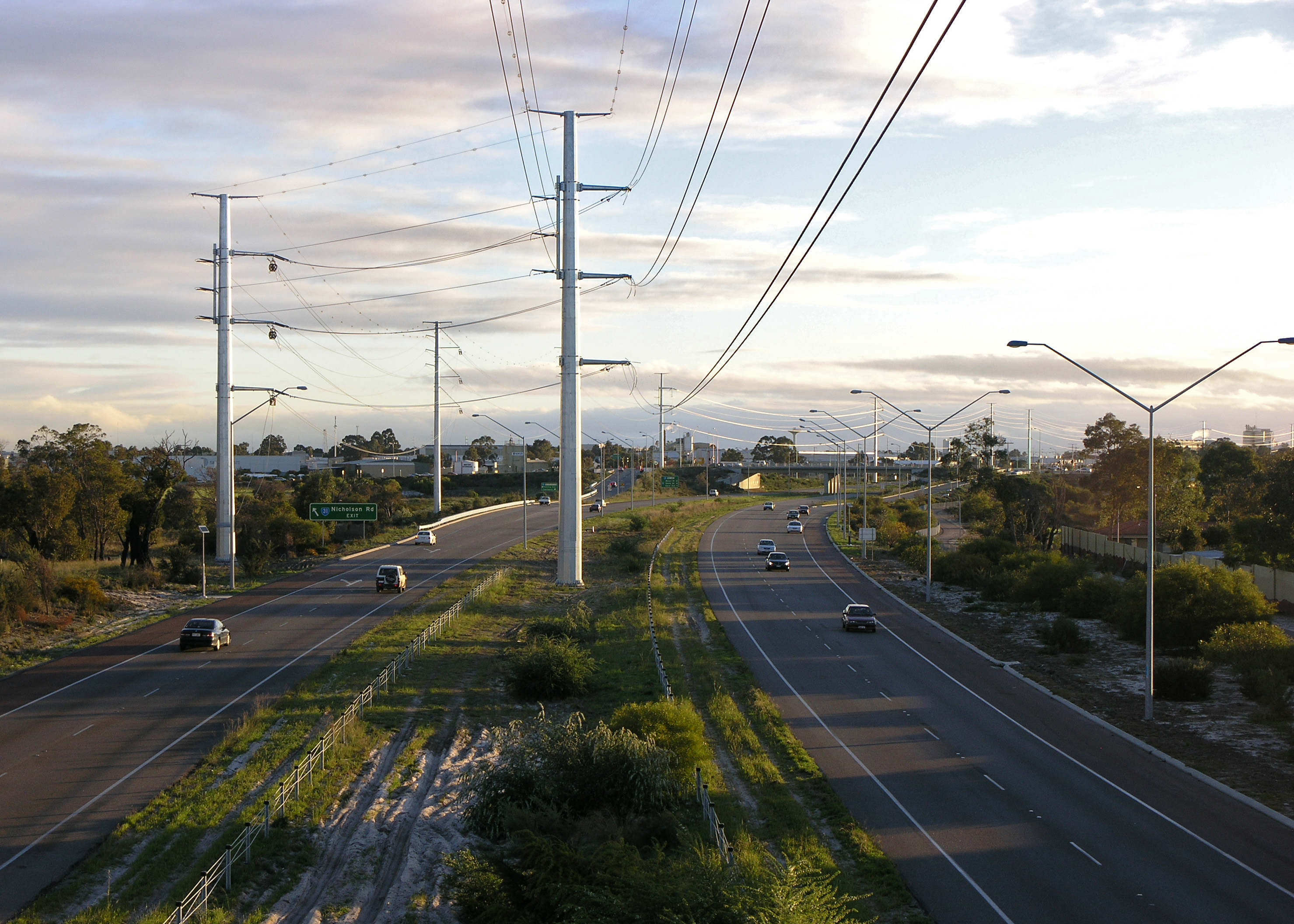
Roe Highway at the Nicholson Road exit

Thornlie is primarily a dormitory suburb with strong transport links to employment elsewhere in the metropolitan region. Albany Highway connects the suburb to the CBD, Roe Highway links it the regional road network. Thornlie is also home to the terminus of the Thornlie line, which is a spur line off of the Armadale line. There are also frequent bus services that serve Thornlie railway station, such as the high frequency route 930 to Elizabeth Quay bus station. There are many other bus services that connect Thornlie Station to other stations on the Transperth Network, such as route 210 and 211 both operating to Gosnells railway station. Also route 206 which serves Cannington railway station. In the future, Thornlie railway station will be upgraded as part of the Thornlie-Cockburn Link works by Metronet, which will mean that it will no longer be the terminus of the Thornlie–Cockburn line. Retail services are provided through local and neighbourhood centres, the largest of which are Thornlie Square Shopping Centre (1970s) and the Forest Lakes Forum (1990s). A range of sporting facilities are available for community use include lawn bowls, tennis courts, a skate park, swimming pool, gyms and ovals for cricket and football. Baseball Park, built in 2007, is the home of Perth Heat, a team in the Australian Baseball League.

== Community ==
Thornlie has two local papers distributed fortnightly, the Comment News and the Gosnells Examiner. 107.3 Heritage FM is a volunteer-run radio station for Thornlie and the City of Gosnells as a whole. Community programmes include the annual Safe City awards including the Community Initiative Award, the Constable Peter Ball Memorial Youth Award and the Community Kids Award.

== Demographics ==
The percentage of residents born overseas (39.4%) is greater than both the national (27%) and metropolitan (31.3%) average. 11.3% of residents were born in England; 3% in New Zealand, and significant smaller percentages from Malaysia, India and Scotland. 14% of residents speak a language other than English at home. Unemployment (3.4%) is lower than the regional average (3.7%) and socio-economic disadvantage less than the City of Gosnells as whole. Weekly household incomes are characterised by a lower proportion of both low and higher income households compared with the Perth average. There are no major differences between the religious affiliation of Thornlie and the Perth region as a whole. The dominant religion is Catholicism (22.4%) followed by Anglicanism (19.5%), Islam (4.6%) and Buddhism (3.5%). Since 2001 there has been a mild decline in the number of Catholics and Anglicans and an increase in the number of Muslims, by 2002 Thornlie had the highest population of Muslims in Perth.

== Crestwood Estate ==
Thornlie contains Crestwood Estate, a model housing development still noted for its successful implementation of the Radburn design principles. Original Radburn architect Clarence Stein reportedly described it as the "first perfect Radburn scheme in the world", and from 1973 to 1976 it received both national and international recognition. Whilst the Radburn principles flavoured many other post-war developments across Australia including the Perth suburbs of City Beach and Karawara, it remains one of the few suburbs that has not undergone a sustained process of "de-Radburnisation" since the 1990s. From a heritage perspective Crestwood is a highly significant link to a major twentieth century urban design movement and a prime example of 1970s progressive suburban design.

Crestwood was based on the ideas of Paul Ritter, the City of Perth's first city planner. Ritter had spent many years advocating the idea that "it takes a village to raise a child". One of his lectures on creating innovative urban environments to meet the needs of family and community life captured the imagination of property developer Ron Sloan. Together Sloan, Ritter and planner Hugh Reynolds designed a residential estate according to a strict design brief.

Crestwood was to be equally efficient and economical as a conventional subdivision, with the same density of homes (1.3 ha or 3.3 acres), but 8% additional open space. Every house was to face a park and roads were to be designed to limit the speed of vehicles. There was to be passive surveillance of recreational areas, and pedestrian traffic through the estate was to be separated from vehicular. Each house was individually designed, some through a design competition organised by the Institute of Architects. The landscaping of the estate was designed by renowned landscape architect John Oldham.

Originally, Crestwood was intended to be built to about five times the size that was eventually constructed. It was to be built around a large pool complex with administration buildings and a recreational area. However, the collapse of land values in the early 1970s led to slow takeup of the allotments and significant losses for Sloan. Opposition from the City of Gosnells, on the grounds that they would not fund the maintenance of any future subdivisions built along the same lines, led to Sloan abandoning the design concept and the subdivision never progressed as envisioned. The remaining land was used in the 1980s and 1990s for two more conventional subdivisions, Forest Lakes and Castle Glen Estates.

The significance of the subdivision was recognised at the time. In 1973 the developer won the Award of Merit from the Urban Development Institute of Australia. In 1975 the Federal Minister for Urban Planning visited the site, and later went on to use the concept for three projects in Canberra. Other delegates visited throughout the 1970s, including academics from the University of Sydney and America.

== Transport ==
=== Bus ===
- 208 Cannington Station to Murdoch University – serves Berehaven Drive and Towncentre Drive
- 212 Thornlie Station to Nicholson Road Station – serves Wilfred Road
- 213 Thornlie Station to Nicholson Road Station – serves Yale Road
- 214 Thornlie Station to Canning Vale – serves Spencer Road, Hume Road, Lachlan Road, Ovens Road and Forest Lakes Drive
- 215 and 216 Thornlie Station to Gosnells Station – serve Spencer Road
- 228 Thornlie Station to Gosnells Station – serves Spencer Road, Spring Road, Thornlie Avenue, Culross Avenue, Connemara Drive, Tullamore Avenue, Bardwell Street and Burslem Drive
- 517 Thornlie Station to Murdoch TAFE – serves Spencer Road and Warton Road
- 930 Thornlie Station to Elizabeth Quay Bus Station (high frequency) – serves Spencer Road
- 930X Thornlie Station to Elizabeth Quay Bus Station - Limited Stops – serves Spencer Road

=== Rail ===
- Thornlie–Cockburn line
  - Thornlie railway station

== Gallery ==
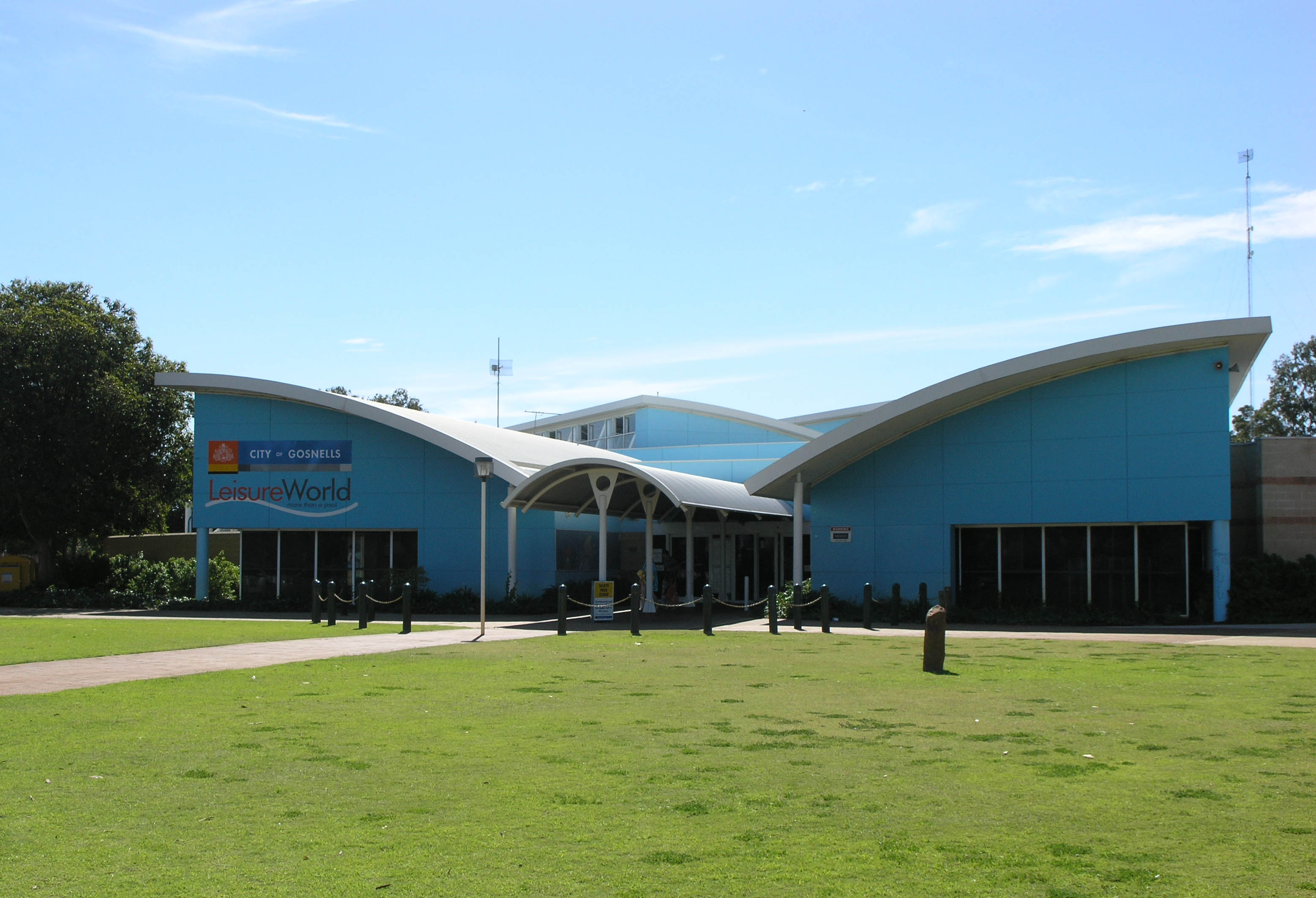
Thornlie Leisure Centre

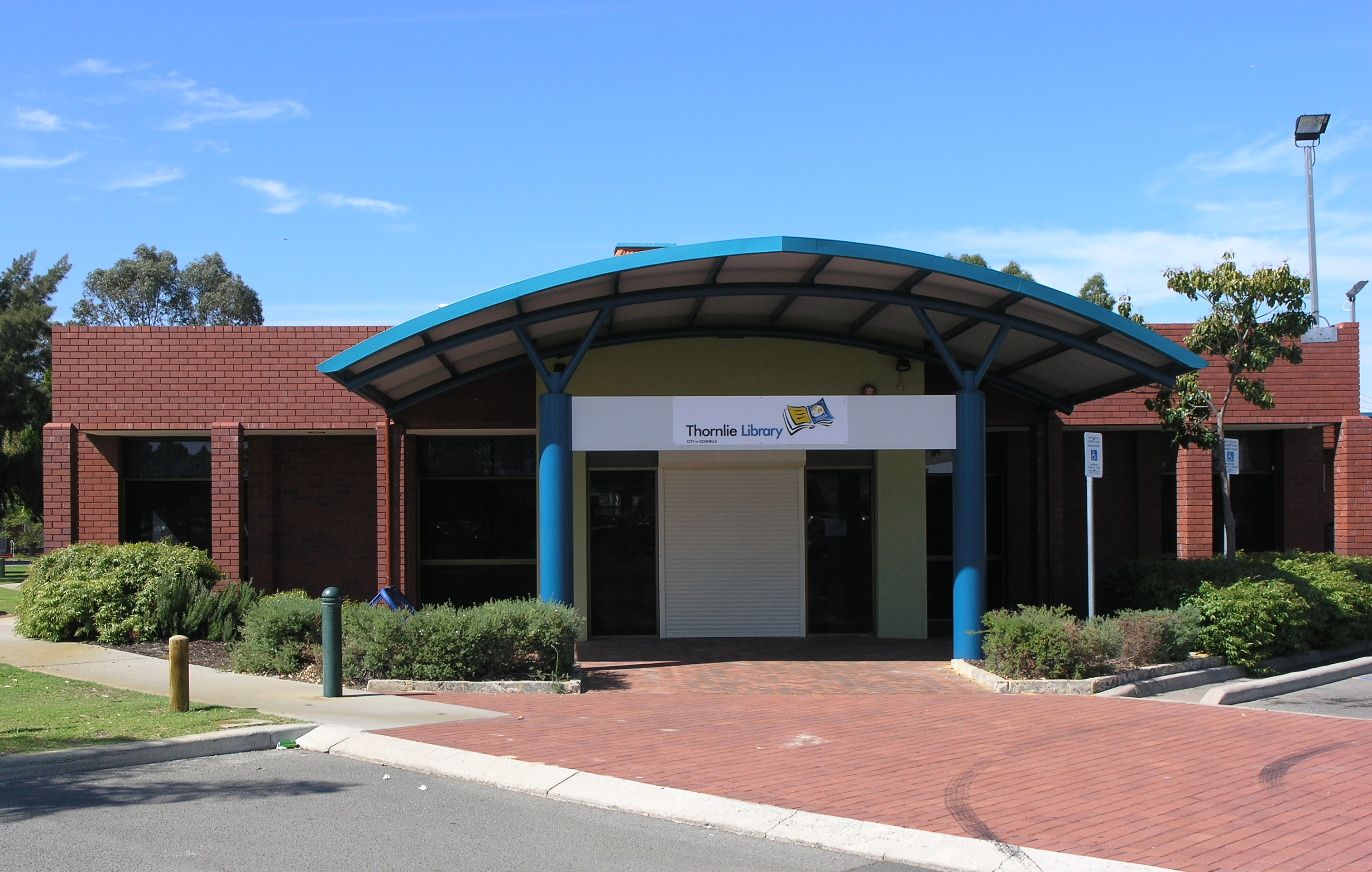
Thornlie Library

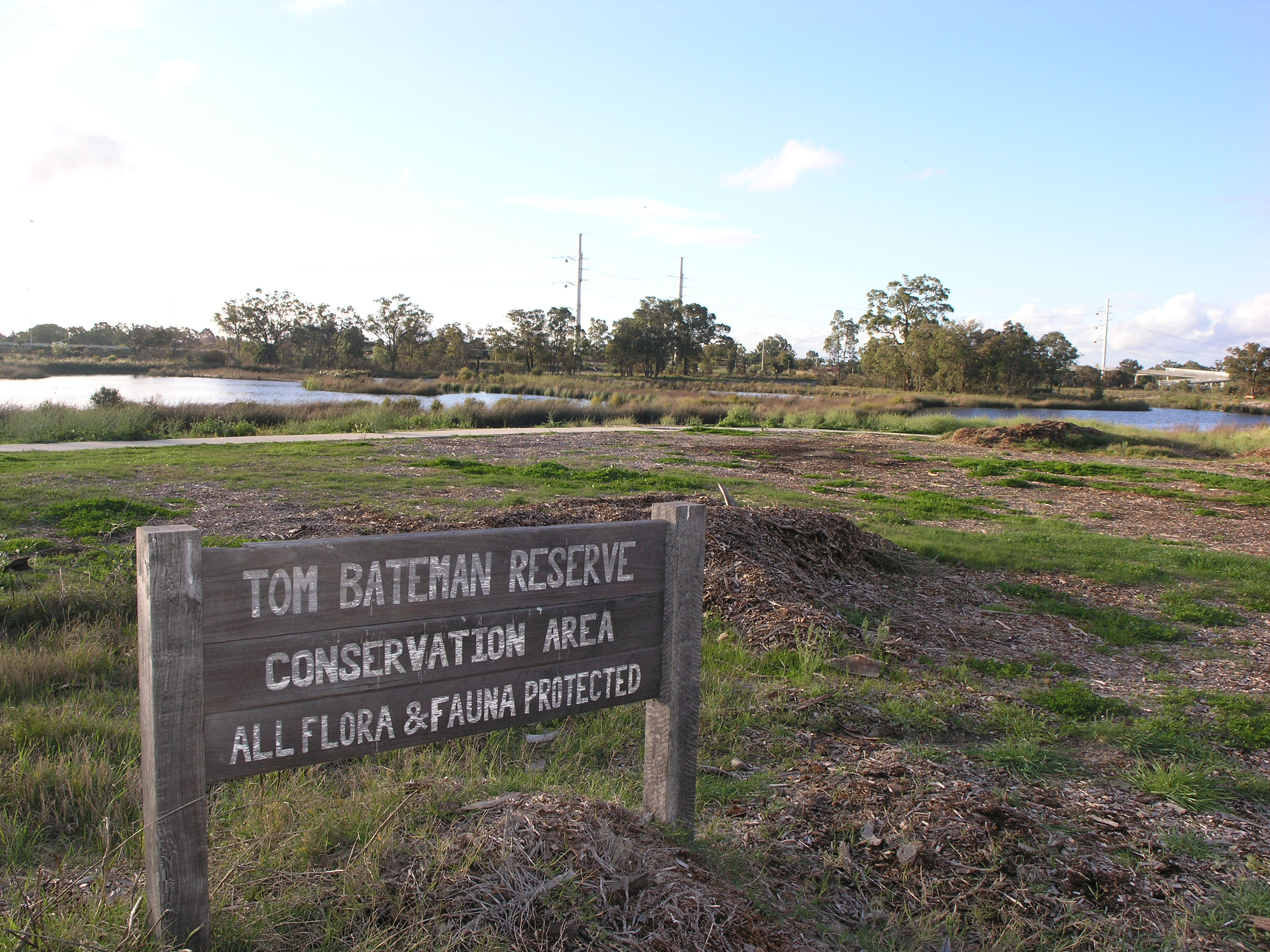
Tom Bateman Reserve

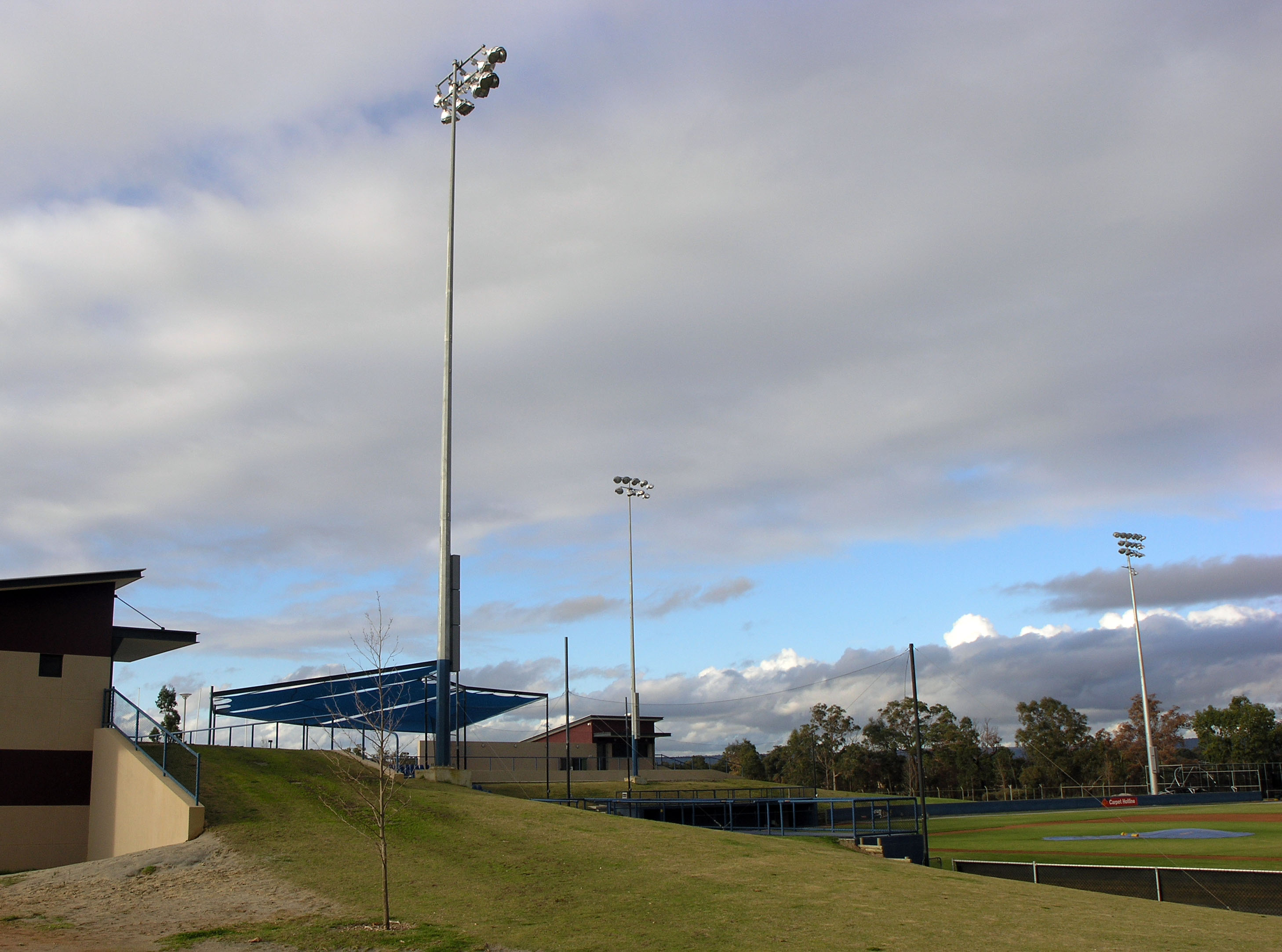
Baseball Park
