= Metronet =

Metronet may refer to:

- Metronet (British infrastructure company), who maintained London Underground infrastructure between 2003 and 2008.
- Metronet (Western Australia), government agency formed in 2017, responsible for managing extensions to Perth's transport network.
- MetroNet, a proposed linking of television stations by Metromedia in the late 1970s that never came to fruition
