= Thornlie–Cockburn line =

Suburban rail line in Perth, Western Australia

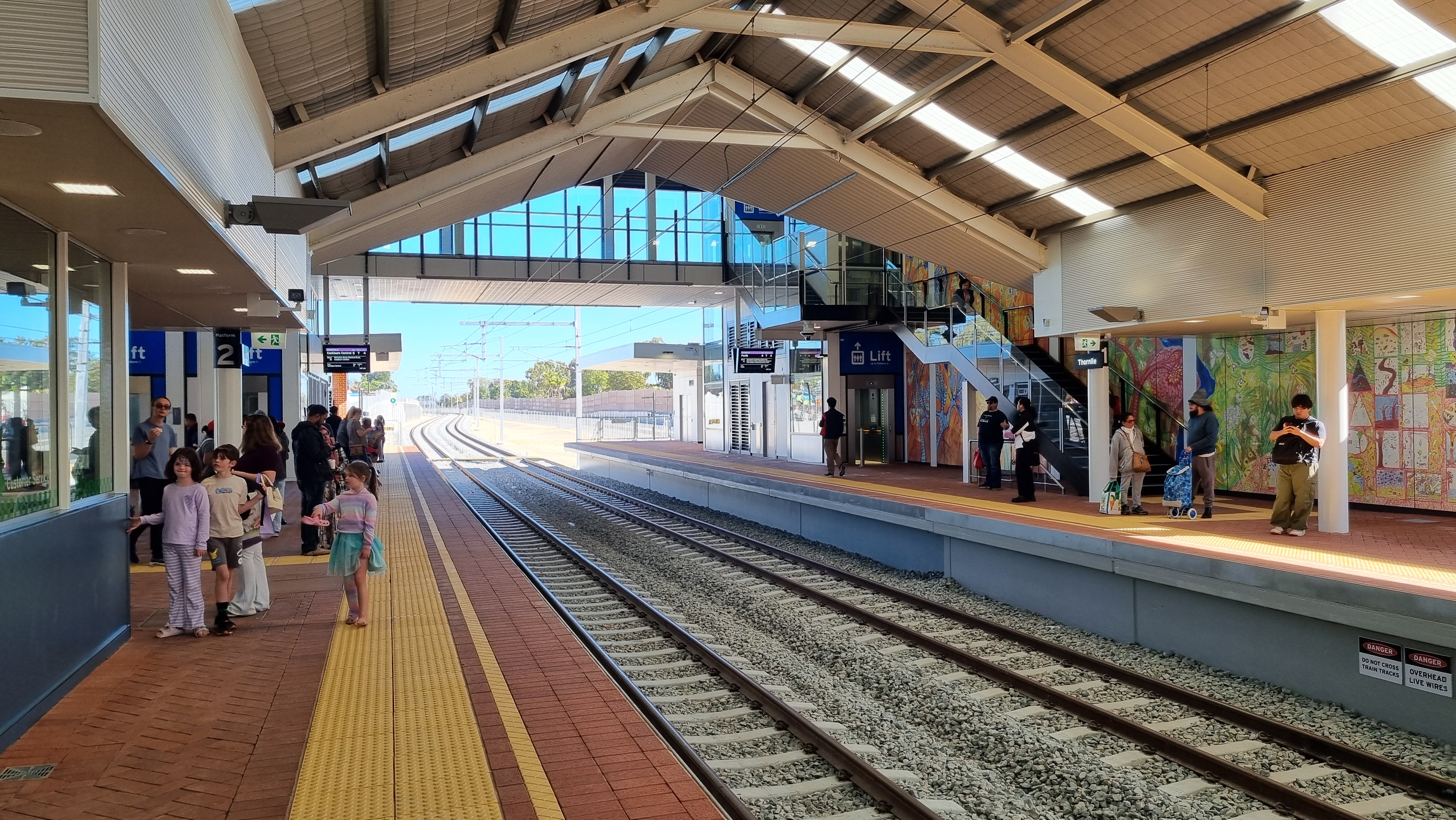
- Thornlie station, June 2025

Overview
- Owner: Public Transport Authority
- Locale: Perth, Western Australia
- Termini: Perth (north); Cockburn Central (south)
- Stations: 15

Service
- Type: Suburban rail
- System: Transperth
- Operator: Public Transport Authority
- Depot: Claisebrook railcar depot
- Rolling stock: Transperth A-series trains; Transperth B-series trains
- Ridership: 4,144,783 (year to June 2026)

History
- Work began: Mid-2004
- Opened: 7 August 2005
- Closed: 20 November 2023
- Reopened: 8 June 2025

Technical
- Line length: 31.6 km (19.6 mi) (Note: This includes 1.3 km (0.8 mi) from Perth station to Claisebrook station, 12.7 km (7.9 mi) from Claisebrook station to Beckenham junction, and 17.6 km (10.9 mi) from Beckenham junction to Cockburn Central station.)
- Num of tracks: 2
- Character: At-grade and elevated
- Track gauge: 1,067 mm (3 ft 6 in) narrow gauge
- Electrification: 25 kV 50 Hz AC from overhead catenary
- Operating speed: 130 km/h (81 mph)
- Signalling: Fixed block signalling
- Train protection system: Automatic train protection
Route map
- Red shading denotes the Free Transit Zone

The Thornlie–Cockburn line, formerly the Thornlie line, is a suburban railway line in Perth, Western Australia, which is operated by the Public Transport Authority as part of the Transperth system. The line branches off the Armadale line south of Beckenham station and runs for 17.6 kilometres (10.9 mi) to Cockburn Central station on the Mandurah line. North of Beckenham station, Thornlie–Cockburn line services run alongside the Armadale line to Perth station.

The Thornlie line originated from initial plans for the Mandurah line, which was to branch off the Armadale line and run along the Kwinana freight railway. The Mandurah line's planned route changed in 2001, but not before tunnels were built for the line to exit the Armadale line south of Beckenham and enter the Kwinana Freeway. It was decided to build the Thornlie line instead as a one-station branch of the Armadale line. The main construction contract was awarded to Barclay Mowlem in 2004 and the Thornlie line opened on 7 August 2005.

In 2017, planning began on a 14.5-kilometre (9.0 mi) extension to Cockburn Central station, known as the Thornlie–Cockburn Link. Built as part of the Metronet project, the contract for the Thornlie–Cockburn Link was awarded to CPB Contractors and Downer in December 2019, and construction began in 2020. Originally budgeted at A$716 million, the construction cost eventually rose to $1.352 billion. On 20 November 2023, the Thornlie line was temporarily closed for construction on the Victoria Park-Canning Level Crossing Removal Project, which resulted in the elevation of five stations between Perth and Beckenham. The Thornlie line reopened on 8 June 2025, upon which the extension opened and the line was renamed the Thornlie–Cockburn line.

Branching from the Armadale line south of Beckenham station, the Thornlie–Cockburn line runs parallel to the Kwinana freight railway, along which there are three stations: Thornlie, Nicholson Road and Ranford Road. At the Kwinana Freeway, the line enters the freeway's median strip and travels parallel to the Mandurah line to terminate at Cockburn Central station. The Thornlie–Cockburn line has a frequency of four trains per hour all day, with lower frequencies at night. The travel time from Perth to Cockburn Central is 36 minutes. All stations on the branch are fully accessible and have 150-metre-long (490 ft) platforms; train lengths are limited by several stations between Perth and Calisle with 100-metre-long (330 ft) platforms. The line recorded 4,144,783 boardings in the year to June 2026.

== History ==
=== Spur to Thornlie ===
Initial plans for the Mandurah line had the line as a spur off the Armadale line along the Kwinana freight railway in the same manner as the present-day Thornlie line. The South West Metropolitan Railway Master Plan was released in March 1999, detailing the route and stations along the railway. The South West Metropolitan Railway would have diverged from the Armadale line at Kenwick, entering a tunnel to pass under the Perth-bound Armadale line track, Albany Highway, Roe Highway, and the freight railway. It would have then travelled parallel and on the southern side of the freight railway, with stations in Thornlie near Spencer Road, Nicholson Road, and in Canning Vale near Ranford Road, and provisions for a future station at Karel Avenue to serve Jandakot Airport. The railway would have then entered another tunnel at Jandakot, known as the Glen Iris tunnel, to go into the median of the Kwinana Freeway, continuing south from there to Mandurah. Several level crossings on the freight railway were planned to be replaced by road-over-rail bridges, at Albany Highway, Spencer Road, Nicholson Road, and Karel Avenue.

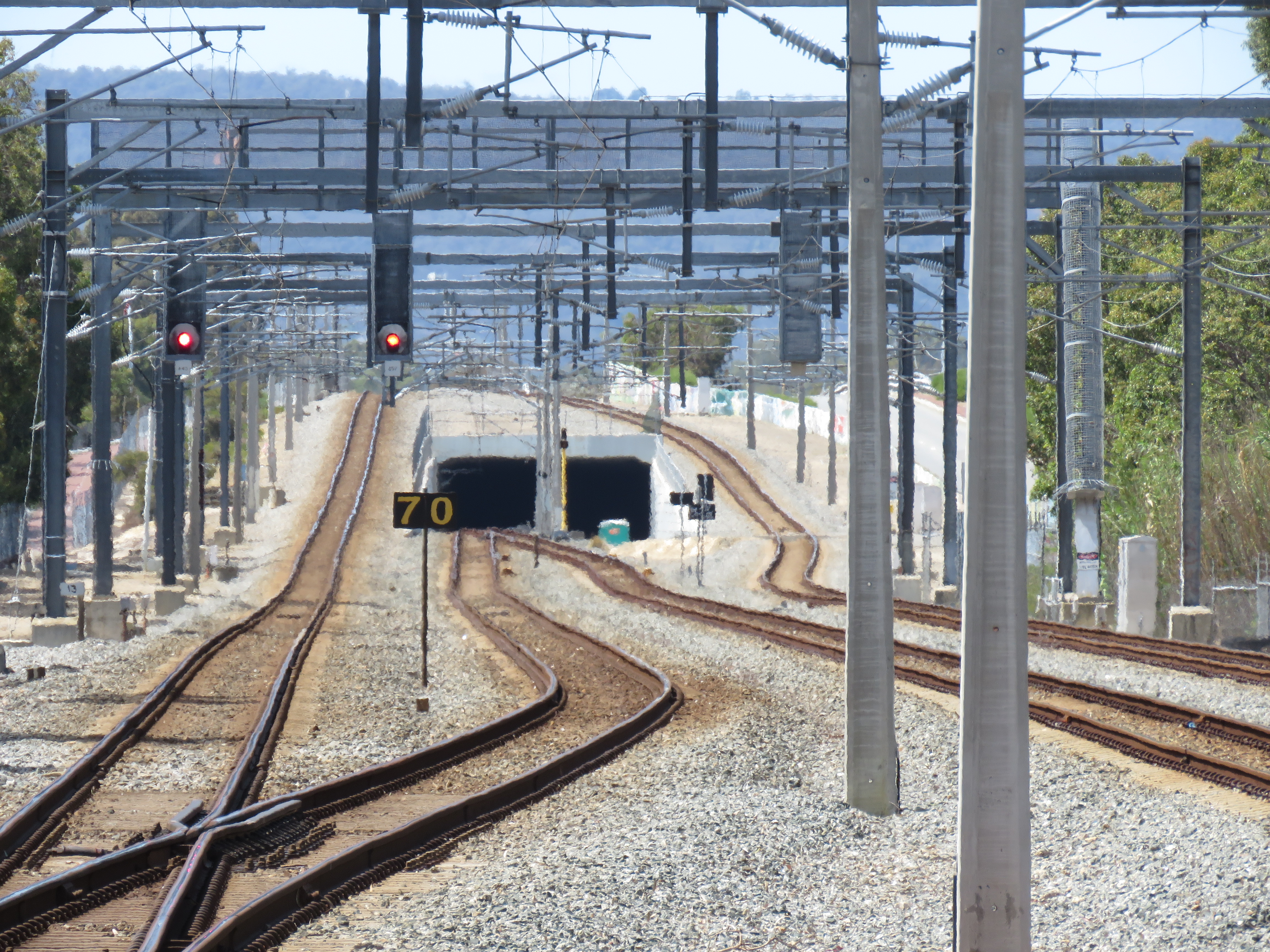
The Thornlie line diverging from the Armadale line and entering the Kenwick tunnel

As part of an extension of Roe Highway from Welshpool Road to Kenwick Link and realignment of Albany Highway in the late 1990s and early 2000s, the first stage of the Kenwick tunnel was built and Albany Highway was grade separated from the freight railway. The 200-metre-long (660 ft) Glen Iris tunnel was also constructed as part of an extension of the Kwinana Freeway in 2000.

Following the election of the Labor Party in 2001, the Mandurah line was rerouted to follow a more direct route along the Kwinana Freeway to the Perth central business district. It was decided to build the Thornlie line as a one station branch of the Armadale line to Spencer Road using the Kenwick tunnel. Building Nicholson Road station was also considered. A new master plan was released in 2002. Spencer Road was planned to be grade separated and Thornlie station was planned to have a bus interchange and parking for about 450 cars. Patronage for Thornlie station was projected to be 3,500 boardings per day. Patronage was not forecast to be high enough for Nicholson Road station to be built initially, but it was expected to be built in the future. Train frequencies were planned to be four trains per hour upon opening in December 2004.

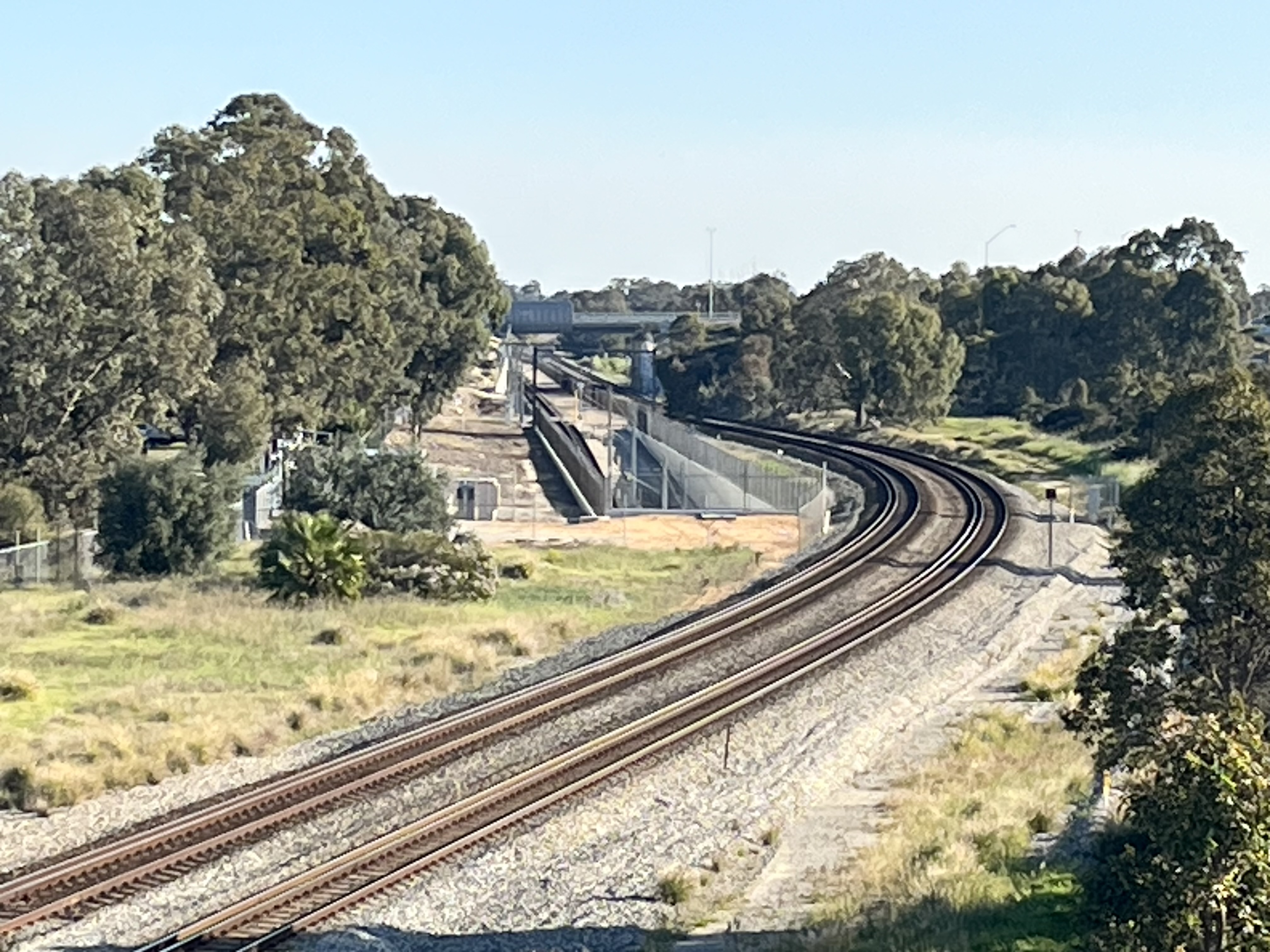
Southern portal for the Kenwick tunnel next to the Kwinana freight railway viewed from the Albany Highway bridge

New MetroRail was formed in 2003 as a division of the Public Transport Authority to manage extensions to railways in Perth, including the Mandurah line, the Thornlie line, and an extension of the Joondalup line to Clarkson station. The second stage contract for the Kenwick tunnel was awarded to John Holland Group in March 2003 at a cost of A$14.225 million. The second stage consisted of 380 metres (1,250 ft) of tunnel; the realignment of 1.4 kilometres (0.87 mi) of the Kwinana freight railway, which was leased by Australian Railroad Group at the time; and the construction of noise walls. The total tunnel length after the two stages was 440 metres (1,440 ft). Workers on the John Holland site went on strike in May 2003 to campaign for better pay and conditions. Construction was also disrupted by a solidarity strike in January 2005 in relation to pay conditions for workers on the Mandurah line.

A new traction substation at Beckenham was constructed to power the Thornlie line and provide backup power to the Armadale line, which was mainly powered by a substation at East Perth. The contract for that was awarded to Western Power Corporation in September 2003 at a cost of $3.3 million. Other work involved relocating BP's Kewdale White Oil Line, which is a pipeline that carries jet fuel, diesel and petrol from the Kwinana import terminal to Kewdale via the freight railway.

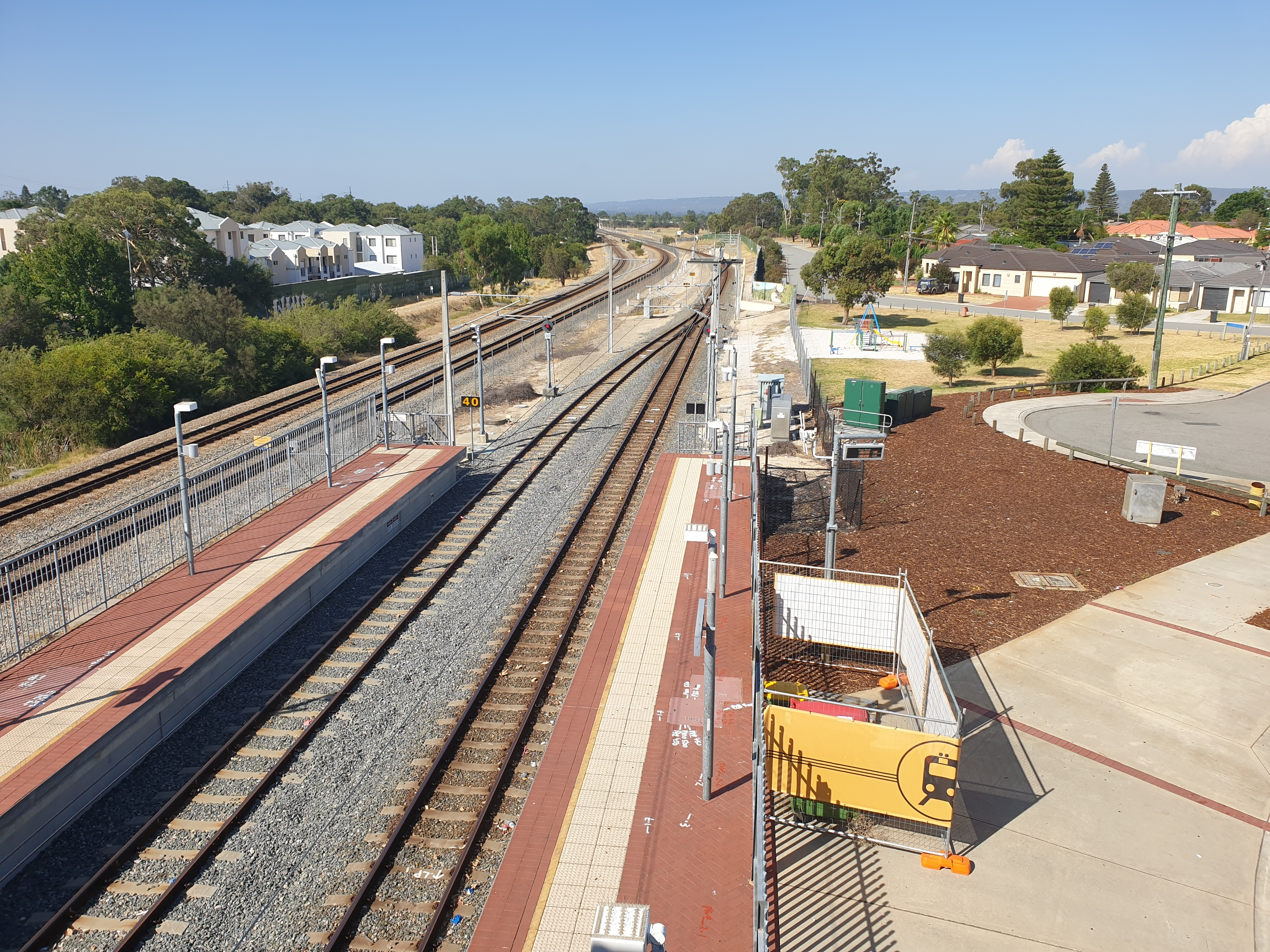
Thornlie station viewed from the Spencer Road bridge, facing east, January 2021

An invitation to tender was sent out on 25 June 2003 for the main contract to build the Thornlie line. This involved constructing Thornlie station, 2.9 kilometres (1.8 mi) of single track railway, a rail bridge across the Canning River and a road bridge for Spencer Road across the Thornlie line and freight railway. The tender was planned to close on 28 August 2003, but that was extended to 16 December 2003. Barclay Mowlem was announced as the preferred tenderer in February 2004 and was awarded the contract by April 2004. The estimated value of the contract was $30 million. By then, the planned opening date was February 2005. Construction had begun by July 2004. Construction was disrupted by strikes. The Construction, Forestry, Mining and Energy Union and union officials were initially fined for breaching an enterprise bargaining agreement, but the fines were overturned by the Federal Court in June 2007. Thornlie station and the Thornlie line were officially opened on 7 August 2005 by Premier Geoff Gallop, Minister for Planning and Infrastructure Alannah MacTiernan, and member for Kenwick Sheila McHale. Full service began on 8 August 2005.

=== Thornlie–Cockburn Link extension ===
An extension of the Thornlie line to link up with the Mandurah line had been proposed several times in the 2010s. In December 2012, the Labor Party announced it planned to incorporate the Thornlie line into a loop line to link the proposed Airport line to the Fremantle line via the Armadale and Mandurah lines if it were to win the 2013 state election. This was part of its proposed Metronet plan. There would have been stations at Nicholson Road, Ranford Road and a station called South Lake at the intersection with the Mandurah line. The Liberal Party won the election, so that plan did not go ahead. In 2015, RAC WA called for the Thornlie line to be extended to Cockburn Central station on the Mandurah line. The Liberal government's 2016 Transport @ 3.5 million plan called for the extension to be built by the time that Perth reaches a population of 2.7 million.

Ahead of the 2017 state election, both major parties committed to extending the Thornlie line to Cockburn Central station. The Liberal government said it could be done at a cost of $520 million and be open in late 2023, whereas Labor said it could be constructed for $474 million by 2021 as part of its revised Metronet plans. Labor won the 2017 election and planning for the Thornlie–Cockburn Link began in late March 2017. In May, following negotiations between the federal and state governments, it was announced that federal funding for the cancelled Perth Freight Link would be used on the Thornlie–Cockburn Link, subject to assessment by Infrastructure Australia. The September 2017 state budget gave the Thornlie–Cockburn Link a cost of $535.8 million.

The business case for the Thornlie–Cockburn Link was submitted to Infrastructure Australia in August 2017. In November 2018, Infrastructure Australia released its assessment of the project, adding the project to the Infrastructure Priority List as a "Priority Project" and giving it a projected economic benefit of $969 million and a benefit–cost ratio of 1.2. Other options considered were only extending the Thornlie line to Nicholson Road and having a station there, or only extending the line to Ranford Road and having stations at Ranford Road and Nicholson Road. Extending the line the whole way to Cockburn was found to be the best choice. Infrastructure Australia recommended that the contract for the Thornlie–Cockburn Link be combined with the contract for the Yanchep Rail Extension of the Joondalup line to save costs during procurement, although local contractors expressed concerns that the two projects had different requirements, were in different parts of Perth, and that combining the projects would price out smaller contractors. The Infrastructure Australia assessment allowed $700 million in federal funding to be spent on the Thornlie–Cockburn Link and the Yanchep Rail Extension, of which $350 million was for the Thornlie–Cockburn Link.

Enabling legislation was introduced to the Parliament of Western Australia in May 2018 and the Railway (METRONET) Act 2018 was passed in November 2018.

==== Scope ====
The project definition plan, detailing the scope of the project, for the Thornlie–Cockburn Link was approved by state cabinet in July 2018. The project was to involve the construction of two new stations: Nicholson Road and Ranford Road stations, each with two 150-metre (490 ft) long island platforms, full disabled access, a bus interchange for feeder buses and a park and ride. Nicholson Road station was forecast to have 2,350 boardings per day in 2031 and Ranford Road station was forecast to have 1,985 boardings per day in 2031. 14.5 kilometres (9.0 mi) of new dual-track railway was to be constructed between Thornlie and Cockburn Central, using the pre-existing Glen Iris tunnel to enter the median of the Kwinana Freeway. Most of this track was to be along the southern side of the freight railway, with the final 3 kilometres (1.9 mi) within the median of the Kwinana Freeway between the two Mandurah line tracks. 3 kilometres (1.9 mi) of single track railway between Beckenham junction and Thornlie station was to be duplicated, including constructing a new bridge across the Canning River. The Kenwick tunnel was already designed for a double tracked railway. To make way for the Thornlie line, 11 kilometres (6.8 mi) of the freight railway was to be relocated slightly north.

Thornlie station was to have its platform's length extended to 150 metres (490 ft) and be converted to allow for through trains, including the construction of an overpass. Cockburn Central station was to have a new platform extending north from the existing Mandurah line platforms for Thornlie line trains to terminate. A new footbridge at Elliot Place was to replace the existing pedestrian level crossing there. Perth Stadium station was to have its Thornlie-bound platforms extended and additional train stowage capacity at Perth Stadium was planned to be built, allowing for direct special event services to Mandurah via Thornlie. At this stage, construction was planned to begin in late 2019 and finish in 2021.

==== Further planning ====
A request for proposal was released in September 2018 for the design and construct contract for the Thornlie–Cockburn Link and the Yanchep Rail Extension. Two consortia were shortlisted in April 2019: METROconnex, a joint venture between Coleman Rail, Clough Group, and Georgiou Group; and NEWest Alliance, a joint venture between CPB Contractors and Downer. In November 2019, NEWest Alliance was announced as the preferred proponent to design and build the Thornlie–Cockburn Link and the Yanchep Rail Extension. The following month, the contract was signed. The value of the whole contract was $1.25 billion and the value of the Thornlie–Cockburn Link portion was $716 million, an increase on the $474 million originally promised by Labor. $366 million was to be funded by the state government and $350 million funded by the federal government. The completion date was delayed by two years to 2023. The delay was blamed on negotiations with BP for relocating the Kewdale White Oil Line and with Arc Infrastructure, the new leaseholder of the Kwinana freight railway.

The Thornlie–Cockburn Link received state environmental approval from the Environmental Protection Authority in August 2019 and federal environmental approval from the Department of the Environment and Energy in early 2020. The main environmental concerns were the impact on wetlands, bushland, and black cockatoo habitats, although most of the bushland that was planned to be cleared was degraded.

==== Bridge widening and construction ====
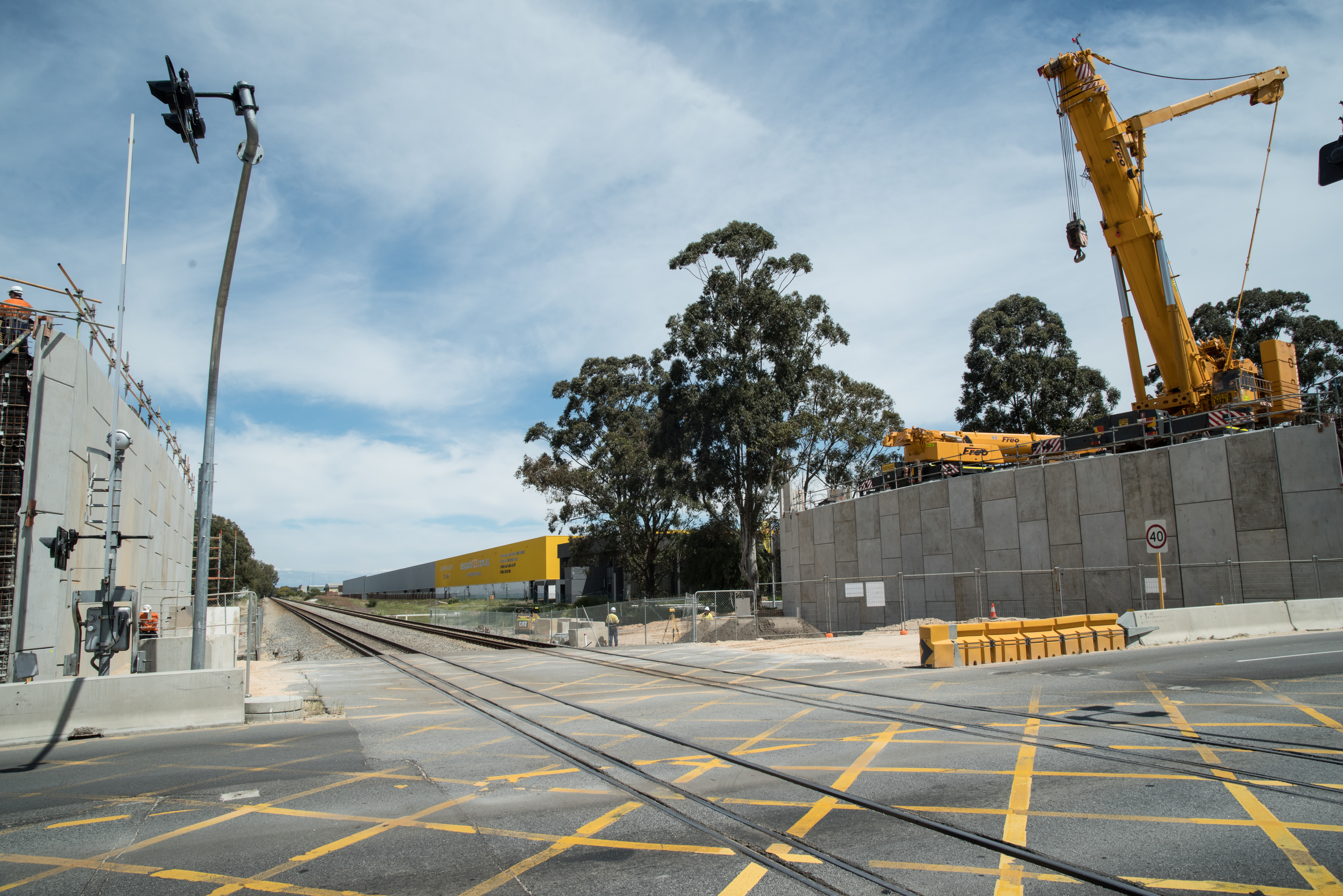
Nicholson Road bridge under construction in October 2017

To make way for the Thornlie–Cockburn Link, the Karel Avenue and Ranford Road bridges were replaced with longer and wider bridges. The Nicholson Road bridge, which was constructed between December 2016 and May 2018 to replace a level crossing, did not have to be rebuilt as it was designed with the Thornlie–Cockburn Link in mind. The Karel Avenue bridge was originally constructed in 2005 and 2006 to replace a level crossing as part of the extension of Roe Highway from South Street to the Kwinana Freeway. The bridge's span was not long enough to fit the Thornlie–Cockburn Link though, so it was replaced with a longer and wider bridge between August 2019 and July 2021.

The original Ranford Road bridge opened in 1985 and the second bridge was built alongside the first between 1997 and 1998, widening Ranford Road to two lanes in each direction. The second bridge was designed with the Mandurah line in mind, but nonetheless, both bridges were replaced for the Thornlie–Cockburn Link to allow Ranford Road to be widened to three lanes in each direction, with the addition of bus lanes and a shared path. Construction on the new bridge started in late 2020. The first stage of the new bridge, which consisted of seven beams, opened to traffic in November 2021, after which the two previous bridges were demolished. The remaining three beams of the new bridge were in place by July 2022. The bridge was meant to be completed in 2023, but it eventually opened in May 2024.

==== Construction ====
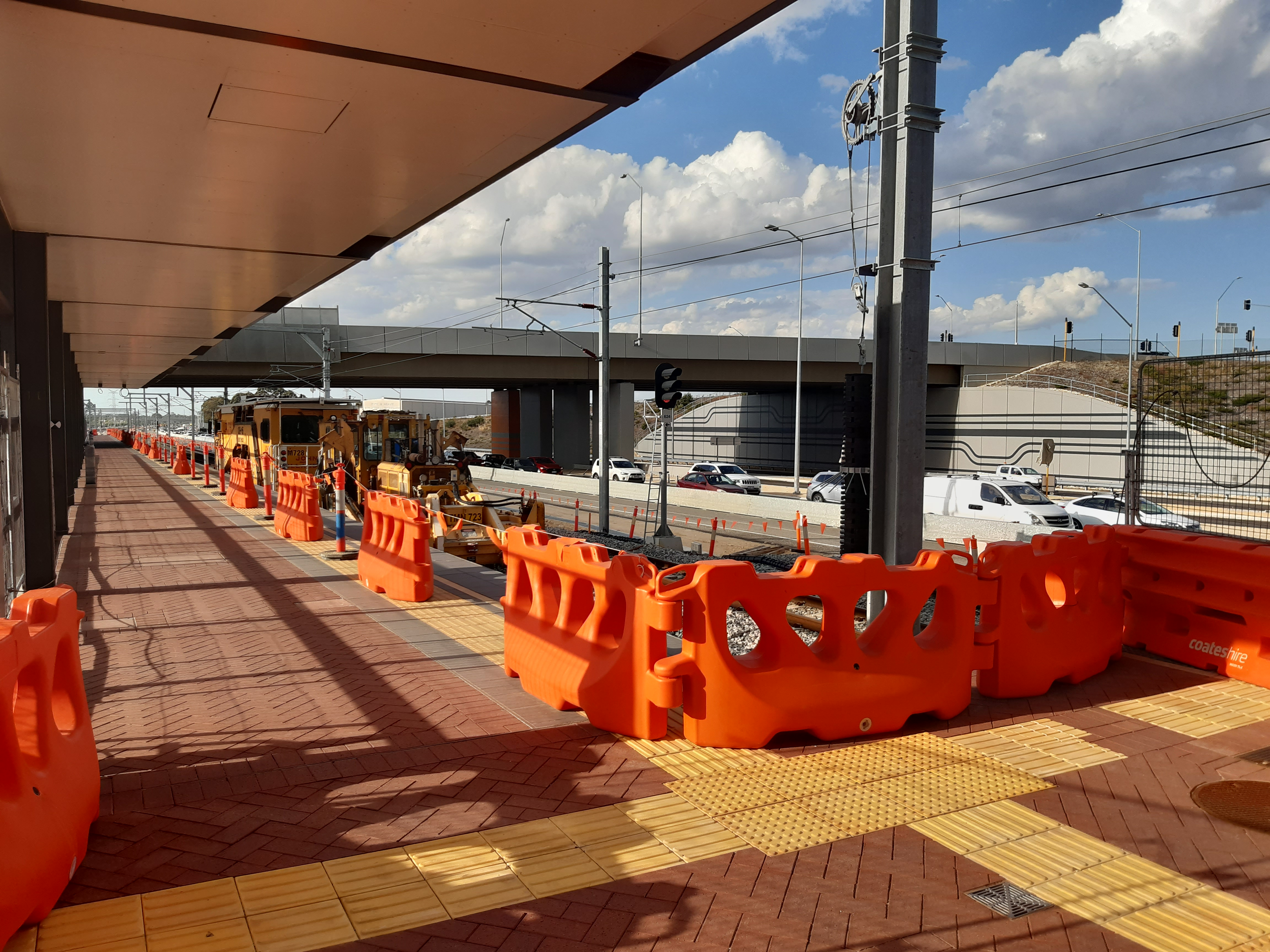
Cockburn Central station platform extension in December 2022

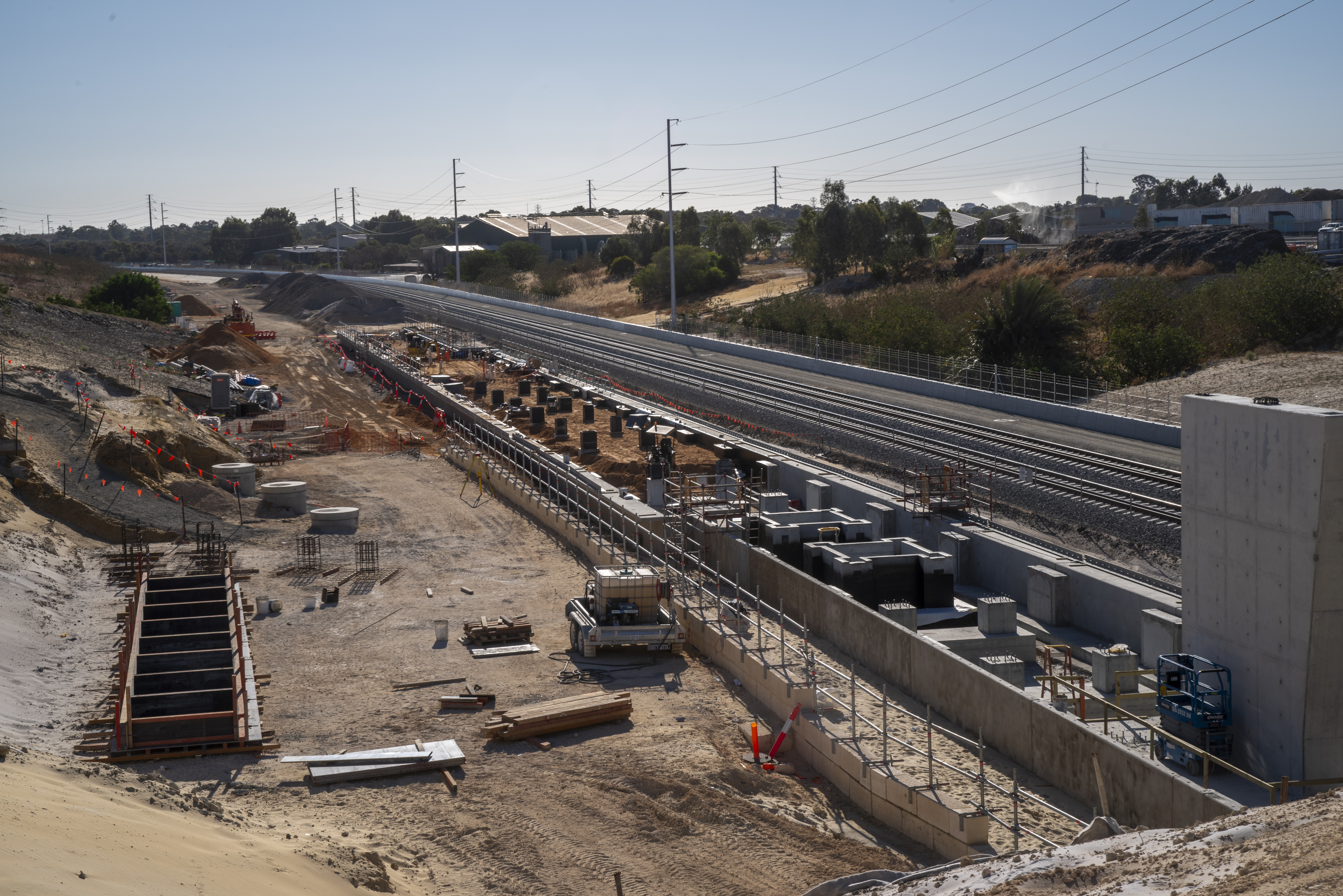
Ranford Road station under construction, February 2024

Early works for the Thornlie–Cockburn Link within the Kwinana Freeway were undertaken under a pre-existing project to widen the Kwinana Freeway throughout 2019 and 2020. This involved drainage works and the erection of barriers between the freeway and railway. Thornlie–Cockburn Link construction was underway by the middle of 2020.

The September 2021 state budget revealed that the opening of the Thornlie–Cockburn Link would be delayed by a year to late 2024 due to a skills shortage and to ease pressure on Western Australia's construction industry. The May 2022 state budget revealed that the Thornlie–Cockburn Link's cost had increased by $164.1 million, a $243.8 million cost increase was revealed in the May 2023 state budget, and a $228 million cost increase was revealed in the May 2024 state budget, taking the total cost to $1.352 billion.

From 26 December 2021 to 14 January 2022, the Mandurah line was shut down between Elizabeth Quay station and Aubin Grove station to facilitate works on the Thornlie–Cockburn Link. This was the longest planned shutdown of a railway line in Perth's history at the time and was done to relocate the Mandurah line tracks between Cockburn Central station and the Glen Iris tunnel to make way for the Thornlie line tracks. The same section of the Mandurah line was shut down again from 26 December 2022 to 3 January 2023, with the exception of New Year's Eve. Work undertaken during that period included the installation of turnouts linking the Thornlie line with the Mandurah line, communication and signalling equipment, overhead line equipment, and 4 kilometres (2.5 mi) of rail.

Relocating the Kewdale White Oil Line involved 11 kilometres (7 mi) of horizontal drilling and about 1 kilometre (0.6 mi) of open-trench digging. An open trench pipeline was originally considered during planning, but the desire to limit disruption to the freight railway meant that predominantly horizontal directional drilling was the final option chosen. Drilling was complete by November 2022, after which a bridge across the Canning River for the pipeline was built. The pipeline was shut down between 23 February and 28 February 2023 for the cutover.

In February 2022, it was announced that the Armadale and Thornlie lines would undergo an eighteen-month shutdown for the Victoria Park-Canning Level Crossing Removal Project along the Armadale line starting in early 2023. Works would be conducted for the Thornlie–Cockburn Link during the shut down as well, such as duplication of the tracks between Beckenham junction and Thornlie station. The 18-month shutdown was later delayed until late 2023, thereby delaying the opening of the Thornlie–Cockburn Link to 2025. The shutdown began on 20 November 2023. Track laying for the relocated freight railway began in mid-2023 and was completed by October 2023, allowing track laying for the Thornlie line to commence. The first train ran on the Thornlie–Cockburn Link on 20 January 2025. The Thornlie line reopened on 8 June 2025, upon which the extension opened and the line was renamed the Thornlie–Cockburn line. A community event was held at the three stations that day to celebrate the opening.

== Future ==
According to the Perth and Peel @ 3.5 Million plan, the Thornlie line will eventually form part of a southern loop line around Perth by a link from the Airport line to the Thornlie line and a link from the Thornlie line to the Fremantle line. The loop line was part of the initial Metronet proposal in 2013, but it has since been removed from any short-term plans.

== Description ==
The Thornlie–Cockburn line uses 1,067 mm (3 ft 6 in) narrow gauge track and has a maximum speed of 130 kilometres per hour (81 mph). Trains are powered by 25 kV 50 Hz AC overhead line equipment which is powered by a substation in Beckenham. Fixed block signalling is used. As part of the High Capacity Signalling Project, Alstom and DT Infrastructure will replace the signalling system with Alstom's Urbalis communications-based train control (CBTC) system, allowing for higher frequencies of service. As of 2026, this is planned to be operational on the Thornlie–Cockburn and Armadale lines in 2032.

=== Stations ===
All stations on the Thornlie–Cockburn line branch have 150-metre (490 ft) platforms, which are long enough to accommodate six-car trains. Train lengths are restricted by several 100-metre (330 ft) platforms between Perth and Carlisle, at Perth (Note: Platform 4 is the only suburban platform shorter than the 150-meter (490 ft) requirement for 6-car trains.), McIver, Claisebrook, Burswood, and Victoria Park stations. These are planned to be extended, starting with Claisebrook and Victoria Park stations.

Station	Distance from Perth		Fare zone	Location	Opened	Connections
Station	km	mi	Fare zone	Location	Opened	Connections
Perth	0.0	0.0	1/FTZ	Perth	1 March 1881	Bus at Perth Busport,Australind, Airport, Armadale, Ellenbrook, Fremantle, Mandurah, Midland and Yanchep lines
McIver	0.7	0.4	1/FTZ	Perth	14 August 1989	Airport, Armadale, Ellenbrook and Midland lines
Claisebrook	1.3	0.8	1/FTZ	East Perth, Perth	1883	Airport, Armadale, Ellenbrook and Midland lines
Perth Stadium	3.3	2.1	1	Burswood	2 December 2017	Event services from Perth, Fremantle, Mandurah and Yanchep run during events at Perth Stadium.
Burswood	4.6	2.9	1	Burswood	1899	Armadale line
Victoria Park	6.1	3.8	1	Lathlain, Victoria Park	1898	Armadale line
Carlisle	7.4	4.6	1	Carlisle, East Victoria Park	2 July 1912	Bus, Armadale line
Oats Street	8.1	5.0	1	Carlisle, East Victoria Park	28 November 1954	Bus, Armadale line
Queens Park	11.3	7.0	2	Cannington, Queens Park	1899	Armadale line
Cannington	12.2	7.6	2	Cannington, East Cannington	1893	Bus, Armadale line
Beckenham	13.6	8.5	2	Beckenham	28 November 1954	Armadale line
Thornlie	16.9	10.5	2	Thornlie	7 August 2005	Bus
Nicholson Road	19.3	12.0	2	Canning Vale	8 June 2025	Bus
Ranford Road	23.3	14.5	2	Canning Vale	8 June 2025	Bus
Cockburn Central	31.6	19.6	3	Cockburn Central	23 December 2007	Bus, Mandurah line

== Service ==
Transperth train services are operated by the Public Transport Authority's Transperth Train Operations division. The Thornlie–Cockburn line has a frequency of four trains per hour all day, reducing to two trains per hour at night. It takes 36 minutes to travel from Perth to Cockburn. Services operate between 5:10 am and 12:32 am on weekdays, extending to 2:17 am on weekend nights. On weekend mornings, services commence at 5:26 am and 6:56 am respectively. Peak frequencies are forecast to remain the same until at least 2031, with capacity increases to be provided for by longer trains enabled by platform lengthening.

During events at Perth Stadium, additional services run direct from Mandurah station to Perth Stadium station via the Thornlie–Cockburn line.

Before the temporary shutdown in November 2023, Thornlie line services skipped Beckenham station and stopped at all stations between Perth and Cannington, complementing Armadale line services, which ran express through most stations between Perth and Cannington. The Thornlie line had a frequency of two trains per hour on Sundays.

=== Rolling stock ===
A Transperth B-series train at Thornlie station

The Thornlie line was served primarily by Transperth A-series trains, with Transperth B-series trains occasionally used as well. By 2031, it is planned that all A-series trains will be retired, leaving the Thornlie line to be served primarily by B-series trains. Upon the reopening of the Armadale Line to Byford in October 2025, the majority of trains on the Thornlie-Cockburn Line are now B-Series trains. The A-series trains were built between 1991 and 1999 and consist of two cars which are usually joined to form four-car trains. Each car has two doors on each side. The B-series trains were built between 2004 and 2019, consist of three cars each and have two doors on the side of each car. The trains are all primarily stored at Claisebrook depot.

=== Patronage ===
When the Thornlie–Cockburn Link opens, the line was predicted to have 12,225 boardings per day, rising to 17,425 boardings per day in 2031. In the year to June 2026, the line recorded 4,144,783 boardings.
