= Canning Vale, Western Australia =

Canning Vale
- Suburb
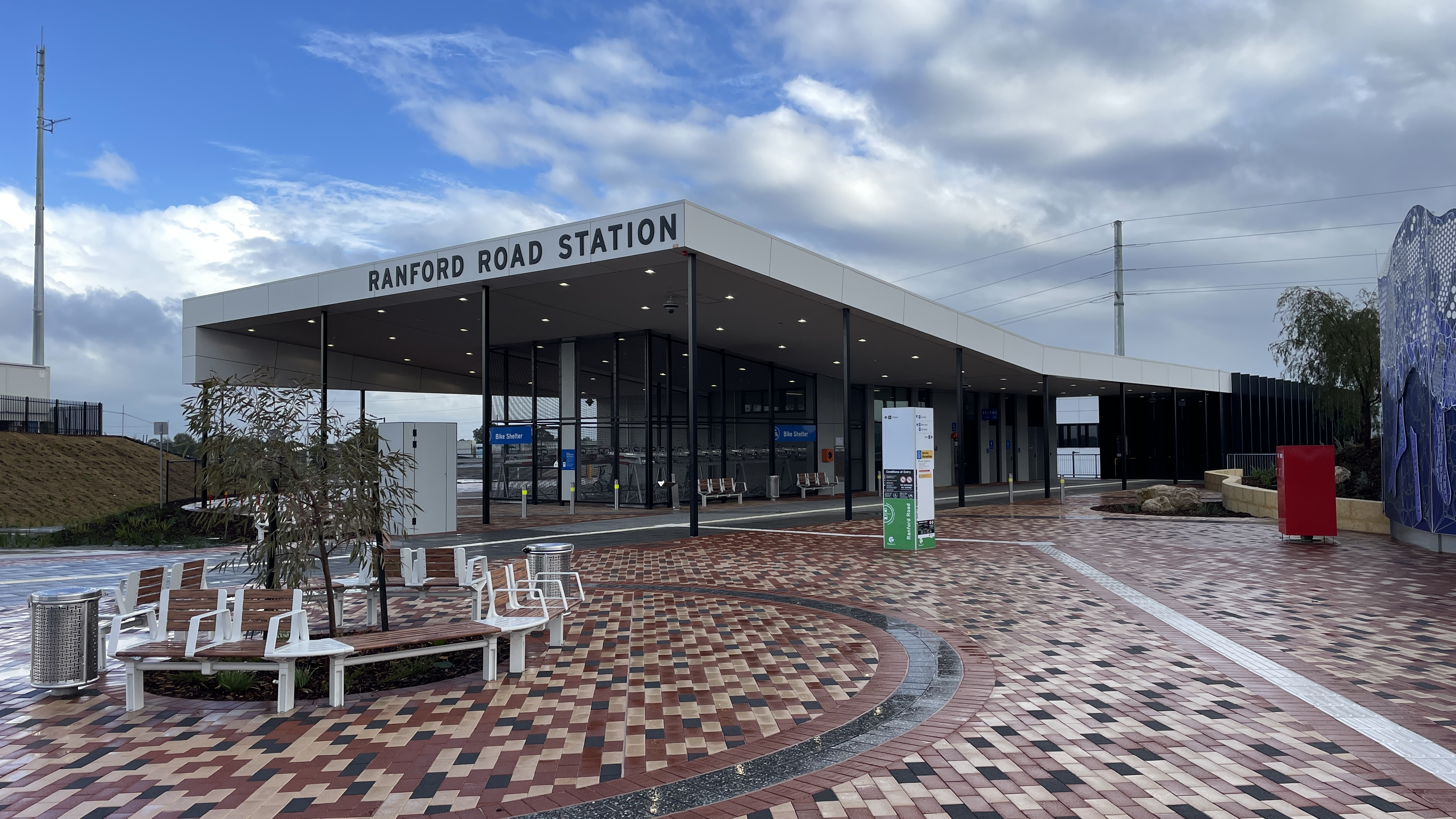
- Ranford Road Railway Station is one of the new Railway stations servicing the suburb of Canning Vale
- Interactive map of Canning Vale
- Coordinates: 32°04′53″S 115°55′01″E
- Country: Australia
- State: Western Australia
- City: Perth
- LGAs: City of Canning; City of Gosnells
- Location: 22 km (14 mi) from Perth
- Established: 1980s

Government
  - State electorate: Jandakot, Southern River
  - Federal division: Tangney

Area
  - Total: 25.3 km^{2} (9.8 sq mi)

Population
  - Total: 34,504 (SAL 2021)
- Postcode: 6155
Suburbs around Canning Vale
Willetton	Riverton	Parkwood
Leeming	Canning Vale	Thornlie
Jandakot; Treeby	Southern River	Huntingdale

Canning Vale is a southern suburb of Perth, 22 km (13.7 mi) from the central business district. Its local government areas are the City of Canning (west of Nicholson Road) and the City of Gosnells (east of Nicholson Road).

== History ==
Canning Vale's name derives from the Canning River, located about 3 kilometres (2 mi) to the suburb's northeast. It was locally known as North Jandakot until 1925.

Until the late 1970s, Canning Vale was a farming area consisting of mostly market gardens and dairy farms due to its swampy terrain with an unusually high abundance of permanent fresh water. Most of the area which is now residential was zoned rural under the Metropolitan Region Scheme until 1994.

Planning for the area incorporated future railway stations at Nicholson and Ranford roads, called Nicholson Road and Ranford Road respectively. These stations were being built as part of the Metronet rail project, were completed and opened in 2025.

== Geography ==
Canning Vale is bounded by Warton Road to the southeast, Garden Street and Nicholson Road to the northeast, Roe Highway to the north and northwest, and Clifton and Acourt roads to the southwest.

The suburb is split into three distinct regions. North of the rail line near Roe Highway is an industrial area that has a number of major warehousing operations including Market City, a wholesale fresh produce market. Also in the area are many distribution facilities such as the Metcash distribution centre. Canning Vale's industrial precinct houses major warehouse production sites such as Swan Brewery (which has been closed and redeveloped) and ACI Packaging, as well as manufacturing plants for the commercial building and mining maintenance industry, such as Complete Field Maintenance and BGC. South of the line is residential with shopping areas. The southern edge of the suburb, contained within a nature reserve, is the Hakea Prison complex.

The industrial area is within the boundary of the City of Canning as well as a portion of the residential estates (including Ranford, Livingston and Waratah). The remainder of the residential area and the prison complex are within the boundaries of the City of Gosnells.

== Demographics ==
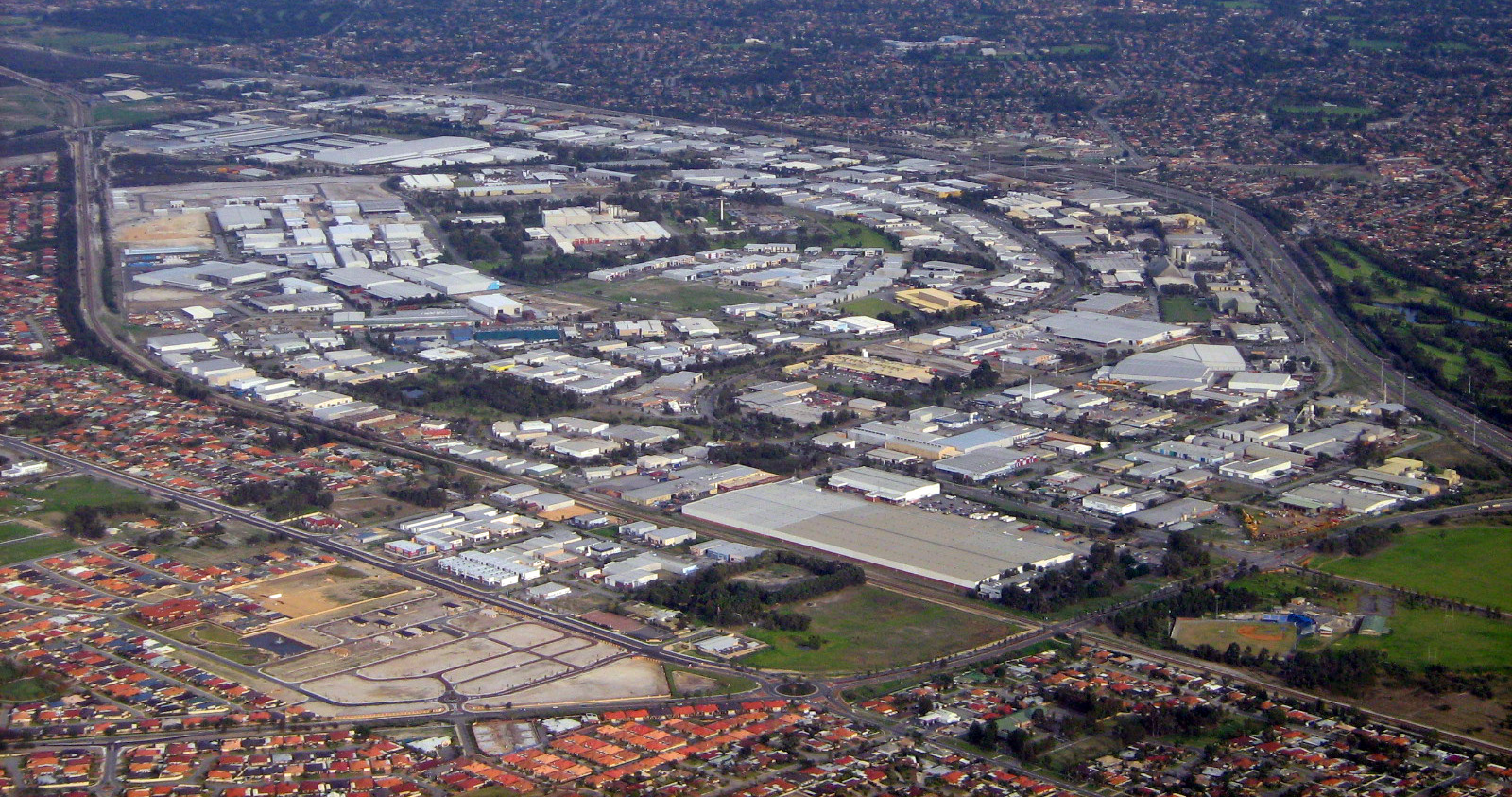
Aerial view of Canning Vale

At the 2001 Australian census, Canning Vale had a mostly lower-middle income population of 12,849 people living in 4,115 dwellings, all but 205 of which were separate houses. The population is very diverse, with 14% of East or South-East Asian descent, and sizeable Indian and Italian minorities.

At the 2006 census, Canning Vale had a population of 23,289, which was predominantly Catholic (24.9%), married (62.8%), and with a median household income of $1,591 per week. Canning Vale has 6,331 families of which 62.8% were couples.

At the 2011 census, the suburb had a population of 30,666, still maintaining its ethnic and religious diversity; 15% of the suburb was of either Chinese or Indian ancestry, and Buddhism and Islam were the third and fourth most practised beliefs in the suburb (after Catholicism, no religion and Anglicanism).

At the 2016 census, the suburb's population was 33,059, with people of either Chinese or Indian ancestry making up 22.4%% of the total.

In the 2021 census, the population increased to 35,504, with those with either Chinese or Indian ancestry increasing to 28.6% of the total's population.

== Facilities ==
Canning Vale contains five retail precincts, four within the residential areas. A large industrial area is located in the north-west.

Community facilities include five primary schools (Canning Vale opened in 1994, Ranford – 1999, Campbell – 2002, Excelsior – 2005, Caladenia – 2007, and the private school St Emilie's Catholic), the high school Canning Vale College, and numerous churches, a Sikh temple, a Hindu temple, a community centre and one golf course (Gosnells Golf Club).

Canning Vale has a junior football club, going under the name of Canning Vale Cougars Junior Football Club. No AFL players have come from the Canning Vale Cougars, but a few WAFL players have come from Canning Vale. The club celebrated their 10th anniversary in 2006. Canning Vale also has a cricket team which is run by the South East Metro Junior Cricket Council and goes by the name of Canning Vale Junior/Senior Cricket Club.

The Canning Vale Senior Football Club (established 2011) has participated in the WA Amateur Football League ever since its formation. It has won the 2011, 2012, and 2013 premierships. Their home matches are played at Clifton Park.

The main shopping centre, Livingston Marketplace (which was opened in 1997 and undergone expansions in 2003-04), is situated at the corner of Ranford Road and Nicholson Road. A second shopping centre, The Vale, is located on the corner of Warton Road and Amherst Road, along Canning Vale's eastern boundary.

The section of Canning Vale to the north of the Nicholson and Warton Road intersection contains Hakea Prison, Melaleuca Remand and Reintegration Facility, and Banksia Hill Juvenile Detention Centre.

== Transport ==
Canning Vale's northern boundary is the Roe Highway, which connects with the Kwinana Freeway (west) and Albany Highway (east) and provides access to Perth Airport, while Nicholson Road heads north towards Cannington, Western Australia and Westfield Carousel, and Ranford Road goes to Armadale (southeast) and Fremantle over Kwinana Freeway via South Street (northwest).

Canning Vale is served by a range of buses linking the area to the Perth central business district, Murdoch University and to Cannington. Many bus services connect with Transperth trains at Murdoch, Maddington or Thornlie stations. Two train stations with bus interchanges have been opened as part of the Thornlie-Cockburn link project, Ranford Road Railway Station and Nicholson Road Railway Station.

=== Bus ===
- 73 Ranford Road Station to Elizabeth Quay Bus Station – serves Bannister Road
- 204 Ranford Road Station to Nicholson Road Station – serves Bannister Road and Baile Road
- 205 Murdoch Station to Nicholson Road Station – serves Bannister Road
- 206 Murdoch University to Nicholson Road Station – serves Ranford Road, Waratah Boulevard, Eucalyptus Boulevard, Nicholson Road
- 207 Murdoch University to Cannington Station – serves Ranford Road, Dumbarton Road, Boardman Road, and Nicholson Road Station
- 208 Murdoch University to Cannington Station - serves Ranford Road, Campell Road, and The Bridgeway
- 209 Murdoch TAFE to Maddington Station – serves Ranford Road, Campell Road Amherst Road and Warton Road
- 214 Canning Vale to Thornlie Station – serves Batman Road and Amherst Road
- 517 Murdoch TAFE to Thornlie Station – serves Ranford Road
- 518 Murdoch TAFE to Cockburn Central Station – serves Ranford Road
- 519 Murdoch TAFE to Armadale Station – serves Ranford Road, Southacre Drive, Goodwood Way, Eastwood Parade, Tobermory Pass and Nicholson Road

=== Rail ===
Thornlie-Cockburn Line

- Nicholson Road Station
- Ranford Road Station
