= Peter Pégus =

Captain Peter Pégus was one of the first European settlers of the Swan River Colony in Western Australia.

Peter was born to Peter Pégus (senior) in 1786, a wealthy cotton-plantation owner in Grenada, after whom Pégus Point on the southern tip of Carriacou is named. In 1806, he served as a Lieutenant with the Royal Tyrone Militia in Ireland. The following year, he transferred to the Connaught Rangers regiment, where he fought against Napoleon in the Peninsular War.

Peter retired from the army in 1828, and applied for land grants in Western Australia, not on the basis of military service, but instead, on the basis of the property he would bring to Australia. Peter's application was successful, and he arrived at the Swan River on 19 October 1829 aboard Atwick, with his wife Mary Jane, his younger son William, 2 sheep, 5 servants, and £1,552. He was allowed to select 7,300 hectares (18,000 acres) of land, which he did in the area known today as Thornlie. This area was named "Coleraine". However, in 1834, Coleraine was largely destroyed in a bushfire, which ended the settlement. Peter, who had lost much of his wealth, then left for Van Diemen's land per Elizabeth (a ship also carrying convicts) in March 1836. Following the death of his first wife in 1839, Peter married Mary Sophia Skardon in Launceston in 1840.

Peter had two sons, Campbell John Pégus, born 1814 in Britain, and William Jeffries Pégus, born 1820 in Glasgow.
