= Canning Vale College =

Public high school in Perth, Western Australia

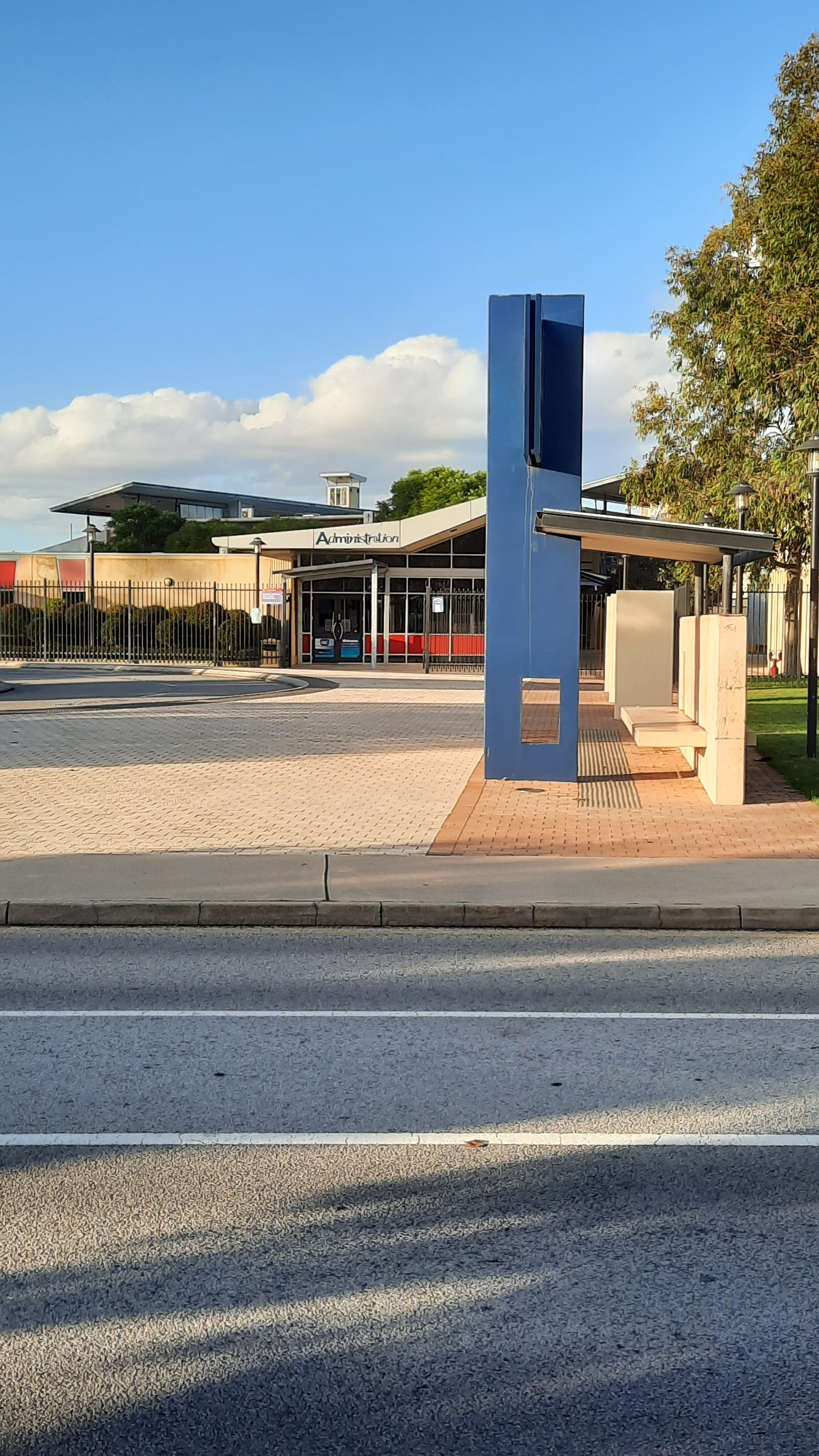

Location
- Canning Vale, Perth, Western Australia; Australia; 32°04′59″S 115°55′23″E

Information
- Type: Public co-educational high school
- Motto: Creating Futures
- Established: 2004; 22 years ago
- Educational authority: WA Department of Education
- Principal: Neil Freckelton
- Staff: 142.1 (31 December 2024)
- Years: 7–12
- Enrolment: 1,333 (31 December 2024)
- Campus type: Suburban
- Colours: Green, red, navy blue and white
- Website: cvc.wa.edu.au

Canning Vale College is a public co-educational high school in the City of Gosnells, located in Canning Vale, a suburb of Perth, Western Australia. It had 1,333 enrolled students as of 31 December 2024.

== History ==
The school opened in 2004. Initial construction cost A$15 million for the business centre, two-level middle school building, arts centre, and library. At the end of 2005, work commenced on the second stage of building at a cost of an estimated A$20 million. This stage included a two-level senior school building, gymnasium, materials technology centre and hard courts. The school has two main buildings.

Enrolments were restricted to years 8 and 9 in 2004. In 2005, this expanded to include year 10, following the education progression of the initial students. As this group of students progresses so too did the school's enrolments, culminating in year 12 enrolments for 2007. From 2015, the school accepted year 7 students.

The school has 5 hectares (12 acres) of wetland and bush area, and as part of their curriculum the students work with environmental organisations to maintain, monitor, and enhance this area.

== Intake area ==
Canning Vale College's intake area is specified by the WA Department of Education and Training to include the suburb of Canning Vale and parts of surrounding suburbs. Feeder primary schools are all, or part of, Caladenia Primary School, Campbell Primary School, Canning Vale Primary School, Excelsior Primary School and Ranford Primary School.

Its neighbouring high schools are Willetton Senior High School to the north-west, Leeming Senior High School to the west, Atwell College to the south and Southern River College to the east.

== See also ==
- List of schools in the Perth metropolitan area
