= Metronet (Western Australia) =

Government agency in Western Australia

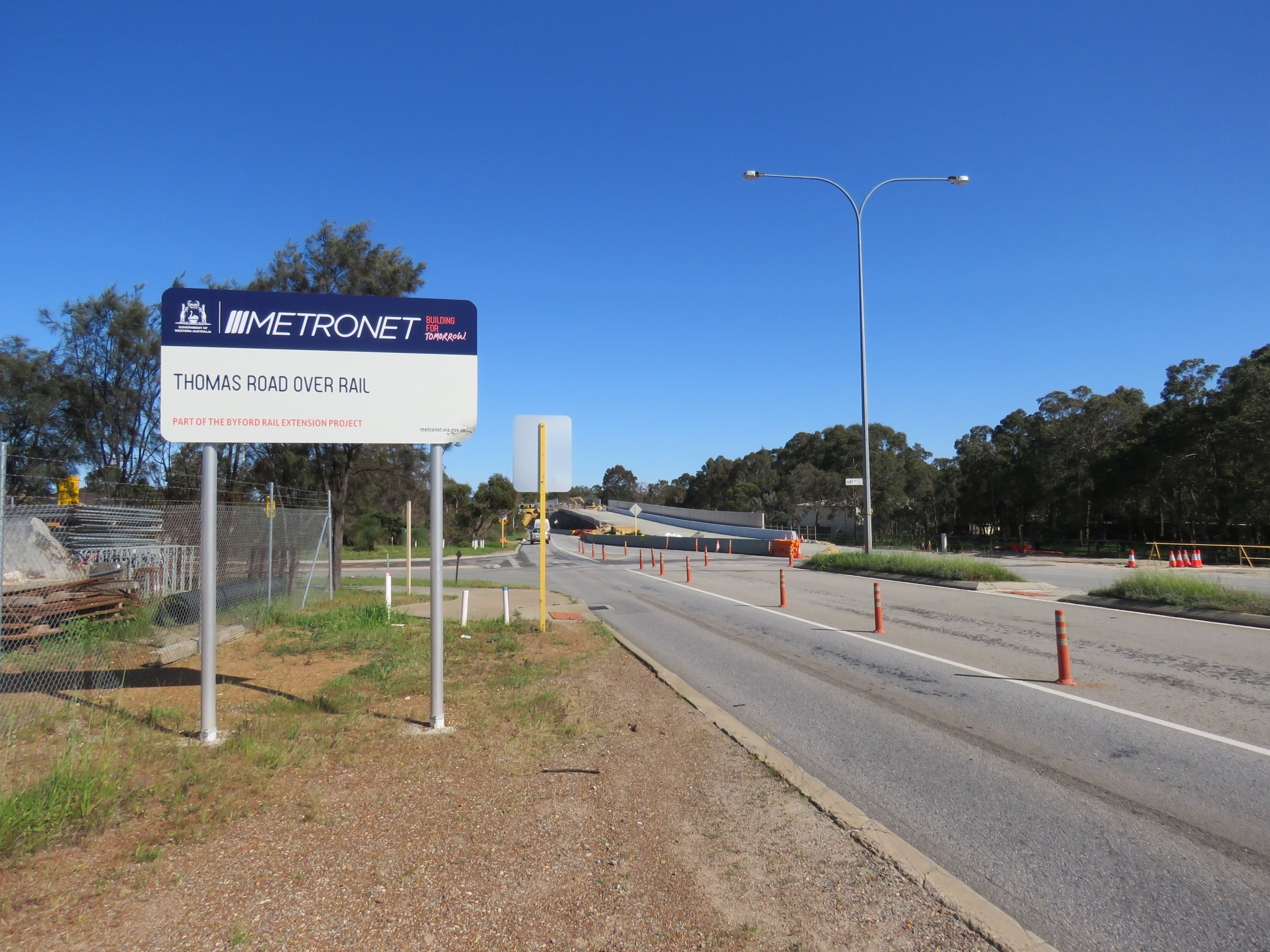
- Construction of the Thomas Road bridge at Byford, August 2022

Agency overview
- Formed: 2017; 9 years ago
- Jurisdiction: Western Australia
- Headquarters: Perth, Western Australia
- Minister responsible: Rita Saffioti, Minister for Transport
- Website: www.metronet.wa.gov.au

Metronet (styled METRONET) is a multi-government agency in Western Australia. It is responsible for managing extensions to Perth's rail network. It was formed to deliver commitments made by the McGowan Government during the 2017 election campaign.

== History ==
Metronet was first proposed as a set of rail infrastructure projects in December 2012 by the opposition Labor Party as an election commitment for the forthcoming 2013 state election. Included were new lines to Ellenbrook, Perth Airport, and eventually Wanneroo (all of which would branch from the existing Midland line), extensions of the Joondalup line to Yanchep, the Armadale line to Byford and eventually Pinjarra, and the Thornlie line to meet the Mandurah line at a new station at South Lake, and new stations at Atwell and Karnup on the Mandurah line.

The extensions were to be arranged into two "circle routes": a North Circle that would share parts of the Joondalup line (from Perth to a new station at Balcatta), Ellenbrook line (from Perth to Noranda), and Wanneroo line (from Noranda to a station at Alexander Drive), along with exclusive tracks and stations between Alexander Drive and Balcatta; and a South Circle that would share infrastructure with the Airport line (from Perth to Forrestfield), the Thornlie line (from Thornlie to South Lake), and the Fremantle line (from Fremantle to Perth), with exclusive tracks between Forrestfield and Thornlie, and between South Lake and Fremantle. While unsuccessful in winning government, the re-elected Barnett Ministry formally approved an alternative airport link in 2014.

In August 2015, the Labor Party proposed a modified, staged version of Metronet as an election commitment for the 2017 election. The plan prioritised completion of the Airport line, the Joondalup line extension to Yanchep, the Armadale line extension to Byford, and the Thornlie line extension. That was expanded to reincorporate a rail line to Ellenbrook and Karnup station by December 2016. After the election of the McGowan Government, the Metronet multi-agency team was formed in 2017 to deliver the commitments.

== Projects ==
Projects managed by Metronet are:

=== New railway lines ===
- Building the 8.5 kilometre Forrestfield–Airport Link with stations at Redcliffe, Airport Central and High Wycombe
- Building the 21 kilometre Ellenbrook line with stations at Morley, Noranda, Malaga, Whiteman Park and Ellenbrook, with provision for a future station at Bennett Springs

=== Railway line extensions ===
- Byford Rail Extension: extending Armadale line services 8 kilometres to Byford
- Yanchep Rail Extension: extending the Joondalup line 14.5 kilometres with stations at Alkimos, Eglinton and Yanchep
- Thornlie–Cockburn Link: connecting Thornlie station on the Thornlie line to Cockburn Central station on the Mandurah line, with stations at Nicholson Road and Ranford Road

=== Stations ===
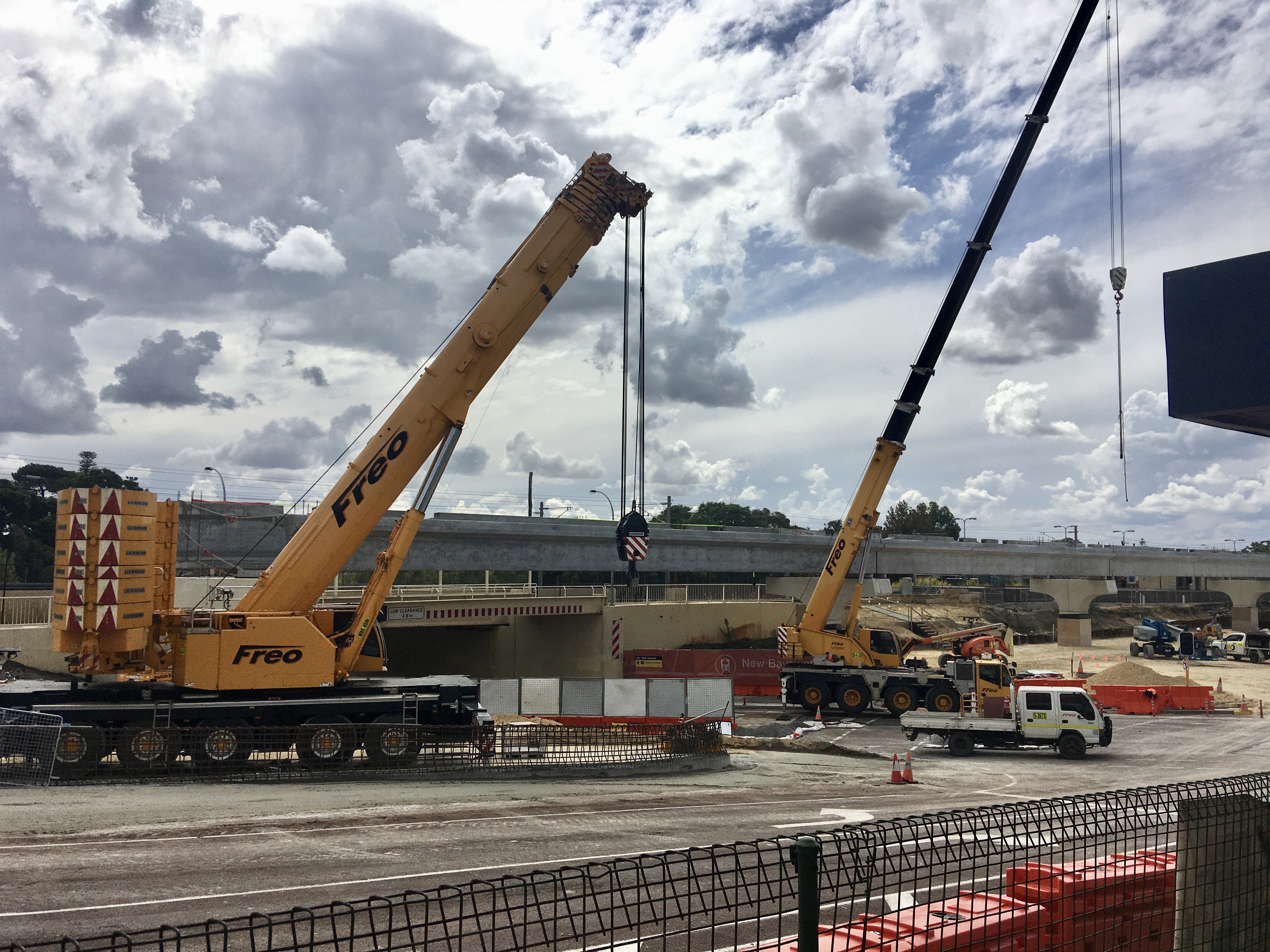
Construction at Bayswater station, April 2022

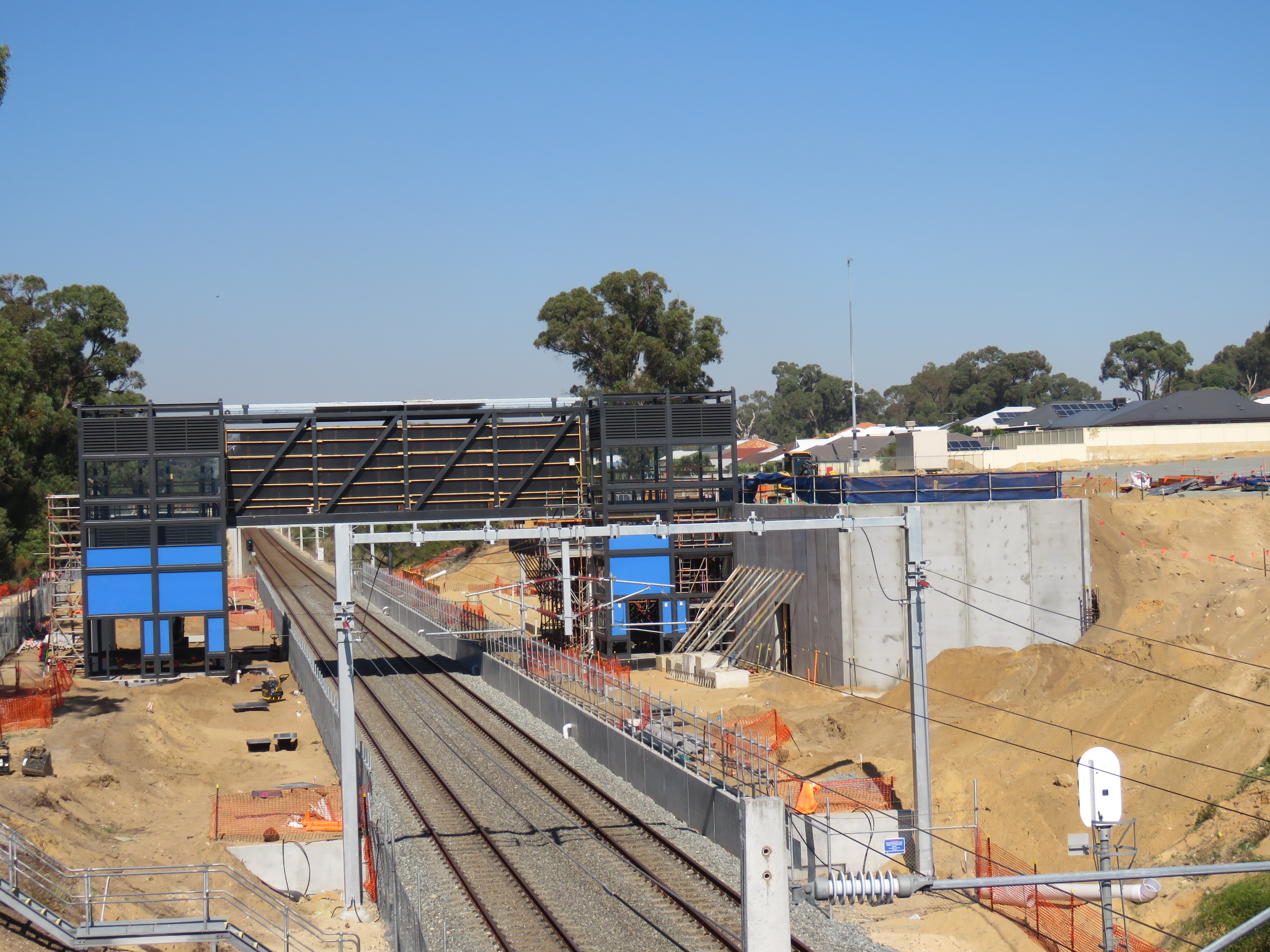
Construction at Lakelands station, May 2022

- Rebuild Bayswater station to accommodate the Midland line, Forrestfield–Airport Link and Ellenbrook line connections
- Relocating Midland station
- Building Lakelands station and Karnup station on the Mandurah line
- Building a multi-storey car park at Mandurah station
- Upgrades to Claremont station and add train turnback for the Airport line

=== Level crossing removals ===
- Removing up to six level crossings on the inner Armadale and Midland Lines, along with Denny Avenue Level Crossing in Kelmscott and Caledonian Avenue Level Crossing in Maylands
  - The Victoria Park-Canning Level Crossing Removal Project, consisting of:
    - Hamilton Street, Wharf Street and William Street Cannington
    - Mint Street, Oats Street and Welshpool Road Carlisle
  - Denny Avenue, Kelmscott
  - Caledonian Avenue, Maylands

=== Signalling ===
- Introducing high capacity signalling

=== Rolling stock ===
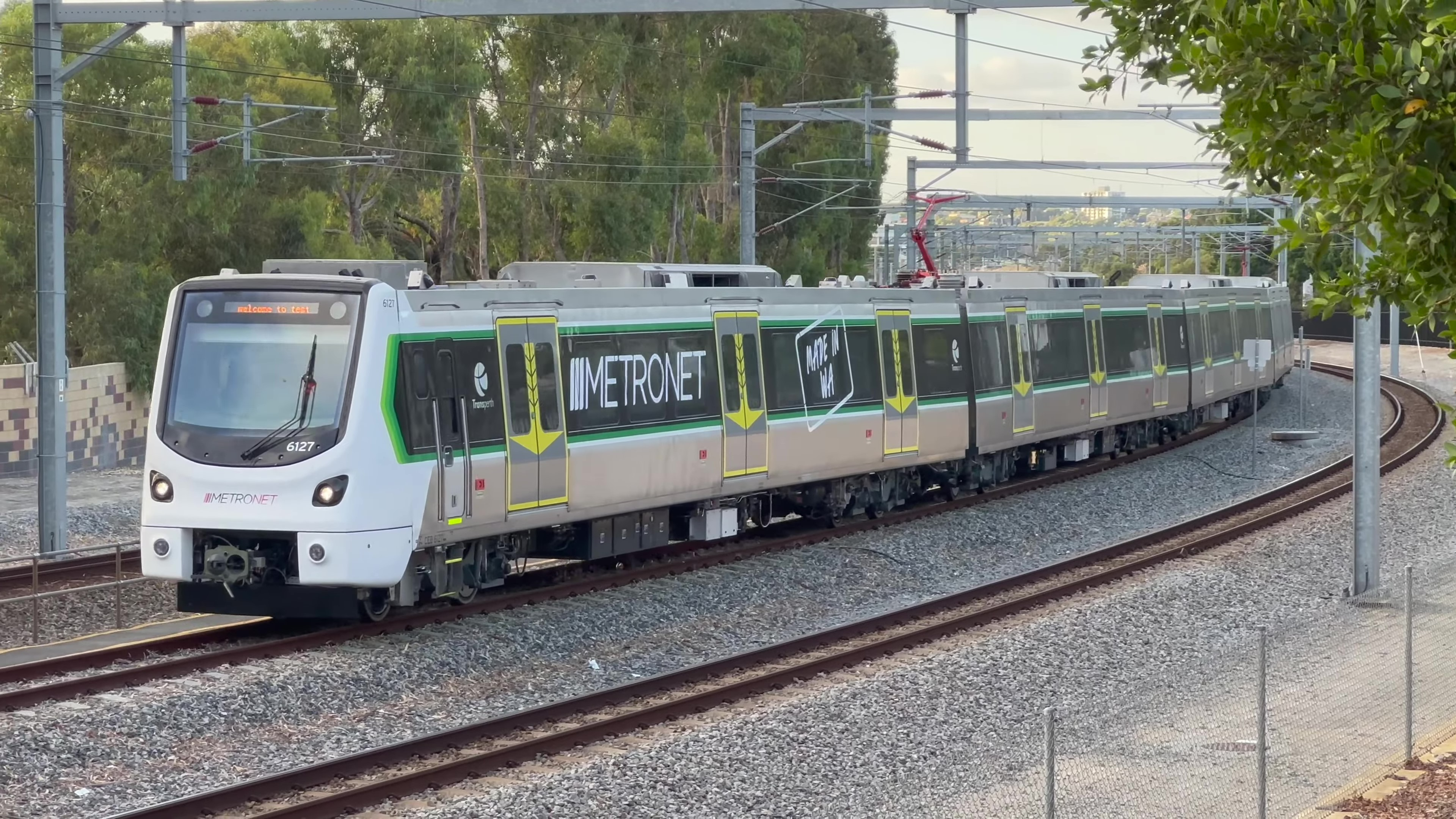
Transperth C-series train during testing between Burswood and Stadium stations, February 2023

- Introducing 41 six-car C-series trains. In August 2019, it was announced that Alstom would be the supplier for the 246 new railcars, each with the capacity to hold up to 1,200 passengers. The tender mandated the railcars contained 50% locally manufactured content. The factory is being built in Bellevue but will be operated by Alstom. In 2017, 13 new six-car sets were ordered at a cost of $410 million but, in a 2019 announcement, the order was expanded to 41 six-car sets, at a cost of $1.3 billion. In March 2024, it was announced that the C-series trains would enter service on 8 April 2024.

== See also ==
- Transperth
- New MetroRail
- Railways in Perth
