= Thornlie railway station =

Railway station in Perth, Western Australia

Thornlie
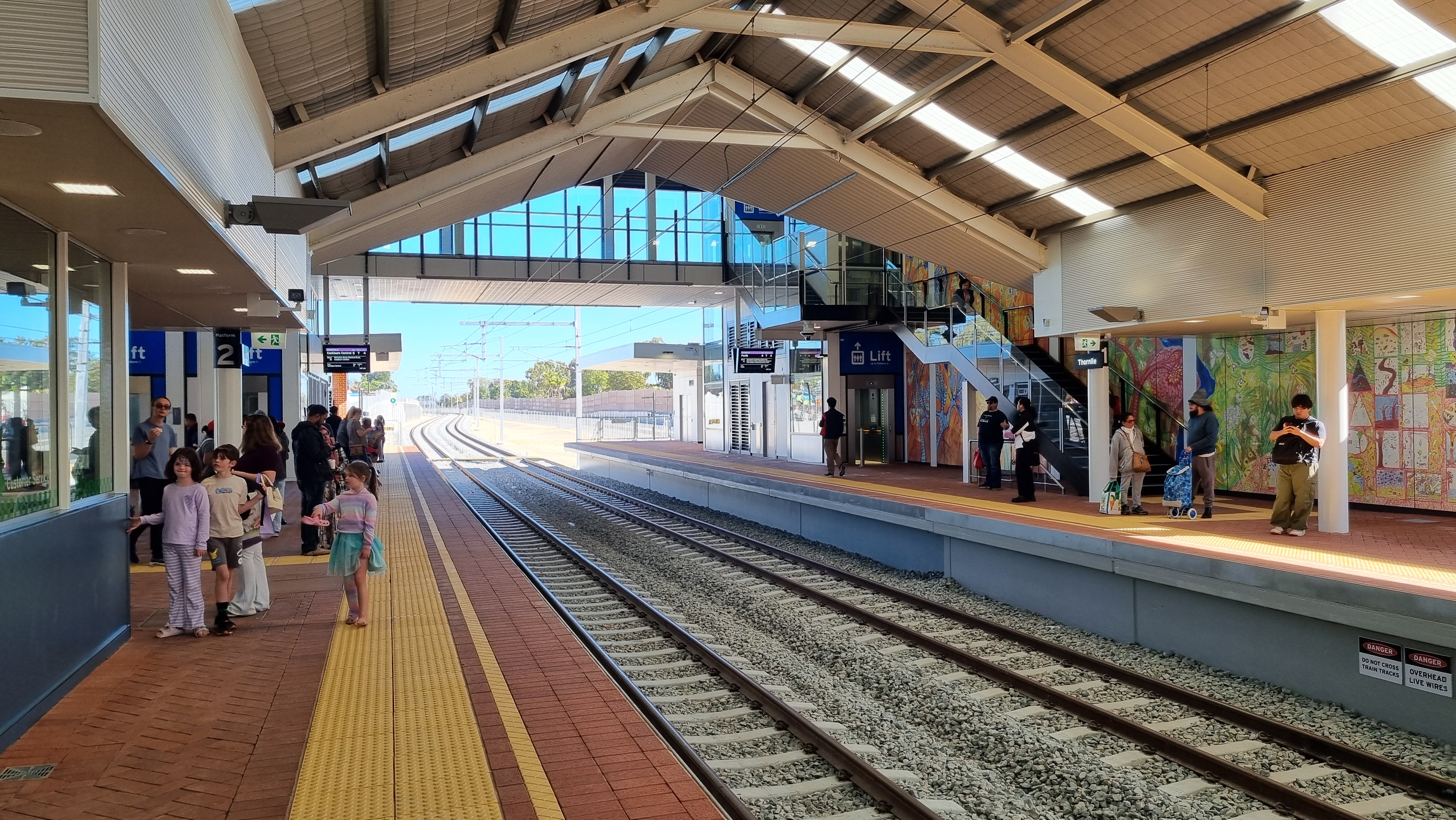
- Westbound view from platform 2, June 2025

General information
- Location: Spencer Road, Thornlie; Western Australia; Australia
- Coordinates: 32°02′50″S 115°57′08″E
- Owner: Public Transport Authority
- Operator: Transperth Train Operations
- Line: Thornlie–Cockburn line
- Distance: 17.0 kilometres from Perth
- Platforms: 2 side
- Tracks: 2
- Bus routes: 9
- Bus stands: 5

Construction
- Structure type: Ground
- Accessible: Yes

Other information
- Station code: ATE; 99104 (platform 1); 99103 (platform 2)
- Fare zone: 2

History
- Opened: 7 August 2005
- Closed: 20 November 2023
- Rebuilt: 8 June 2025

Passengers
- 2013–14: 578,199

Services
| Preceding station | Transperth | Following station |
|---|---|---|
| Beckenham towards Perth | Thornlie–Cockburn line | Nicholson Road towards Cockburn Central |
Events
| Perth Stadium Terminus | Mandurah line Stadium special | Nicholson Road towards Rockingham or Mandurah |
Location
- Location of Thornlie station

Thornlie railway station is a suburban railway station on the Transperth network. Located seventeen kilometres (11 mi) from Perth station, it serves the suburb of Thornlie, Western Australia. It was the original terminus of the Thornlie line, a spur of the Armadale line, before the line was extended through to Cockburn Central station along the Mandurah line via two stations, Nicholson Road station and Ranford Road station. Upon completion of the extension, the Thornlie line was renamed the Thornlie-Cockburn line.

== History ==
In February 1989, having committed to the delivery of a metropolitan rail line to Joondalup, the government announced that a south western corridor would be investigated.

In July 1995, the government committed to the delivery of a rail link to Mandurah partially along the Kwinana Freeway before diverting along the existing freight rail alignment through Canning Vale and Thornlie and joining the Armadale line via Kenwick.

In December 1999, legislation was tabled by the Government of Western Australia to build the Southern Suburbs Railway from a junction with the Armadale line east of Beckenham Station passing beneath Albany Highway, Roe Highway and the Kwinana freight line via the Kewdale Tunnel, then paralleling the freight line south to Jandakot before entering the Glen Iris tunnel and continuing via the median strip of the Kwinana Freeway.

However, in 2002, following a change in government, the Southern Suburbs Railway was altered to operate via a more direct route to Perth. By this stage the first part of the Kenwick Tunnel had been built. Despite the cancellation of the original route alignment, the route was converted into a short spur line terminating at Thornlie. This, combined with a bus interchange provided a service for the rapidly expanding suburb of Canning Vale.

The spur and Thornlie station opened on 7 August 2005.

=== Thornlie–Cockburn link ===
Thornlie station was modified for the extension of the Thornlie line to Cockburn Central station on the Mandurah line. Modifications included extending the two existing 100-metre (330 ft) long platforms to 150 metres (490 ft), to accommodate six car trains; construction of a concourse to link the two platforms, with lifts and stairs; modifications to the station's car park; changing the shared bike and pedestrian path, moving and replacing bicycle facilities; upgrading toilets, staff amenities, services and systems to modern standards; and replacing the nearby Western Power electricity substation. While the bus station remained in use during these works, rail services to Thornlie were suspended for a period of 18 months during works to the Armadale and Thornlie lines. Thornlie station reopened along with the rest of the Thornlie-Cockburn line to regular services on 9 June 2025.

== Services ==
Thornlie station is served by Transperth Thornlie–Cockburn line services.

The station saw 578,199 passengers in the 2013-14 financial year.

== Platforms ==
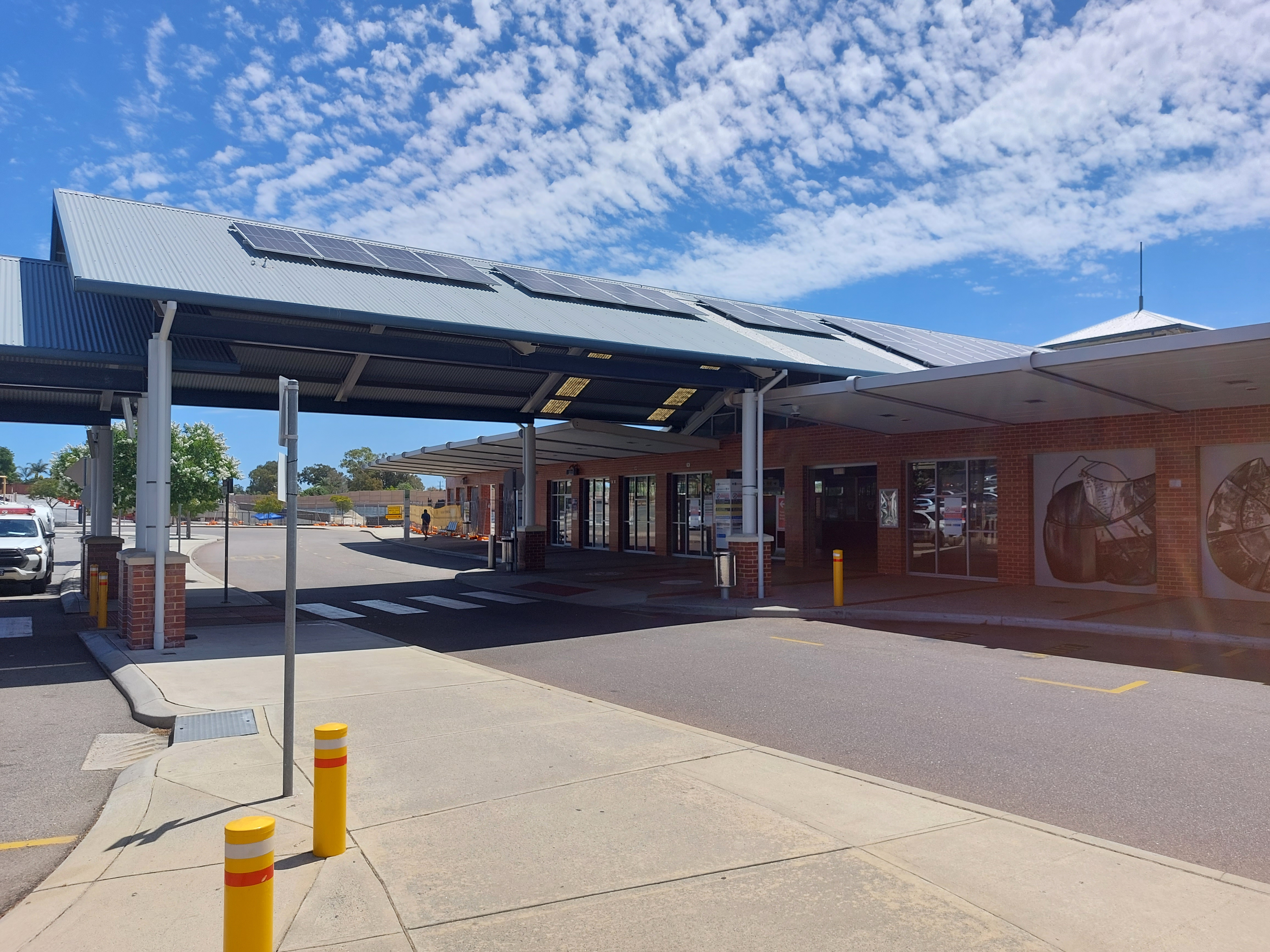
Southern view of platforms 1 and 2 in June 2025

Thornlie platform arrangement
| Stop ID | Platform | Line | Destination | Via | Stopping Pattern | Notes |
|---|---|---|---|---|---|---|
| 99103 | 1 | Thornlie-Cockburn line | Perth | | All stations, TP | |
| 99104 | 2 | Thornlie-Cockburn line | Cockburn Central | | All stations | |

== Bus routes ==
| Stop | Route | Destination / description | Notes |
|---|---|---|---|
| Stand 5 | 208 | to Cannington Station via Spencer Road & Langford Avenue | |
| Stand 4 | 930 | to Elizabeth Quay Bus Station via Westfield Carousel, Albany Highway & St Georges Terrace | High Frequency |
| Stand 4 | 908 | Rail replacement service to Cannington Station | Change to 907 at Cannington for other destinations. |
| Stand 3 | 208 | to Murdoch University via Fraser Road North, Livingston & Murdoch station | |
| Stand 3 | 207 | to Murdoch University via Nicholson Road, Livingston & Murdoch station | |
| Stand 1 | 216 | to Gosnells Station via Fremantle Road | |
| Stand 1 | 215 | to Gosnells station via Dorothy Street | |
| Stand 1 | 214 | to Southern River via Forest Lakes Drive, Huntingdale Road, Harpenden Street | |
| Stand 3 | 228 | to Gosnells Station via Thornlie Avenue, Maddington Station & Westfield Street | |
| Stand 2 | 517 | to Murdoch Station via Spencer Road, Balfour Street & Furley Road | |
