= Ranford Road railway station =

Railway station in Canning Vale, Western Australia

Ranford Road
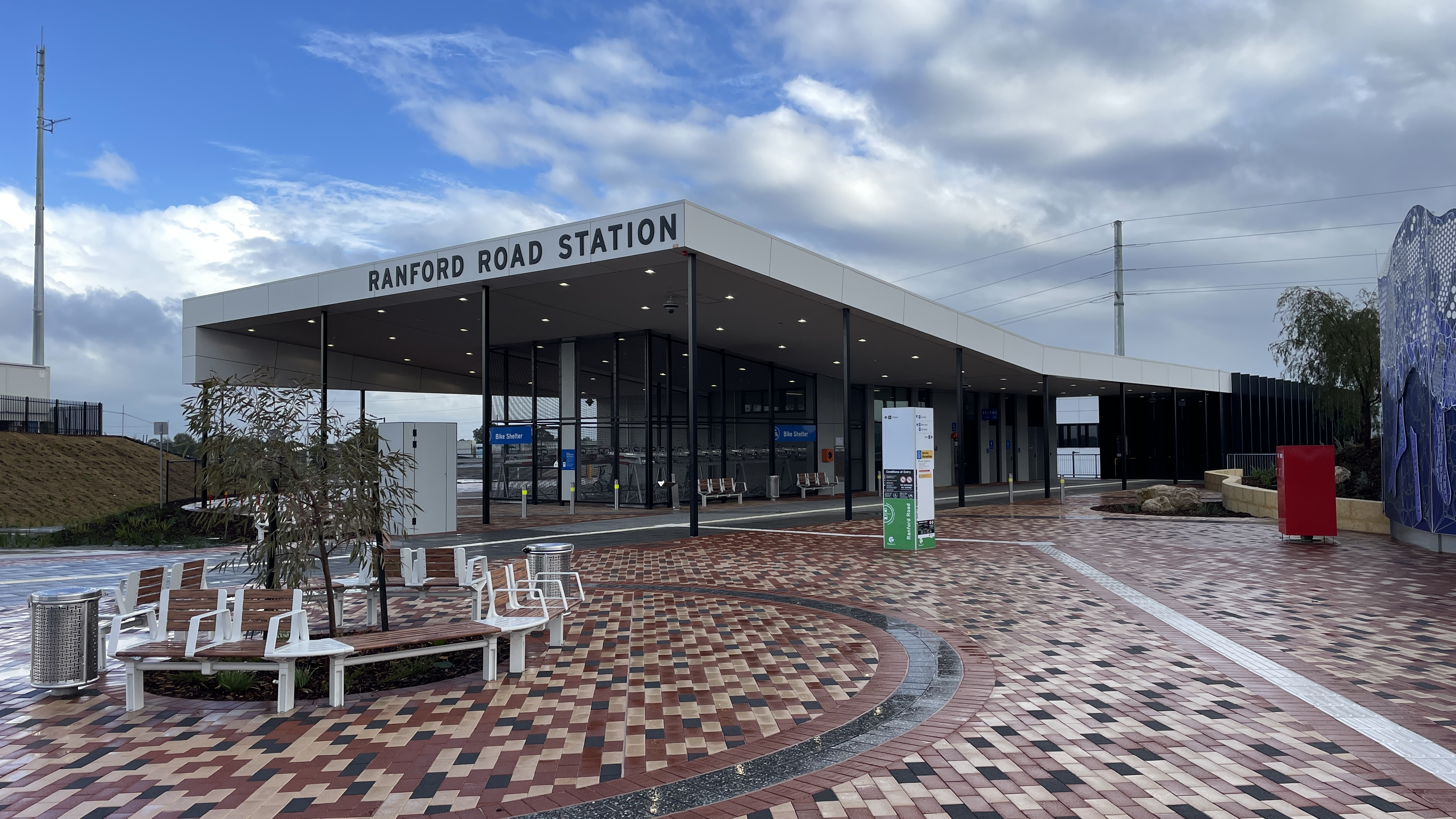
- Ranford Road Station main entrance

General information
- Location: Ranford Road, Canning Vale; Australia
- Coordinates: 32°04′32″S 115°53′45″E
- Owner: Public Transport Authority
- Operator: Transperth
- Line: Thornlie–Cockburn line
- Platforms: 2 (1 island)
- Tracks: 2
- Bus stands: 14
- Connections: Bus

Construction
- Structure type: Ground
- Parking: Yes
- Accessible: Yes

History
- Opened: 8 June 2025

Services
Preceding station	Transperth	Following station
Nicholson Road towards Perth	Thornlie–Cockburn line	Cockburn Central Terminus
Event Services
Nicholson Road towards Perth Stadium	Mandurah line Stadium Special	Cockburn Central towards Rockingham or Mandurah
Location
- Location of Ranford Road railway station

Ranford Road railway station is a railway station on the Thornlie–Cockburn line in Perth, Western Australia. It opened on 8 June 2025.

The station includes a bus interchange with 14 stands, and approximately 400 car parking spaces. Situated in a cutting 8.5 metres (28 ft) lower than Ranford Road, the station is accessed from a precinct entry road off the proposed Jandakot Airport Eastern Link Road. Approximately 1,985 daily boardings are predicted at Ranford Road railway station in 2031. Services to Perth and Cockburn Central are provided by Transperth Trains, with the journey to Perth taking approximately 29 minutes.

== History ==
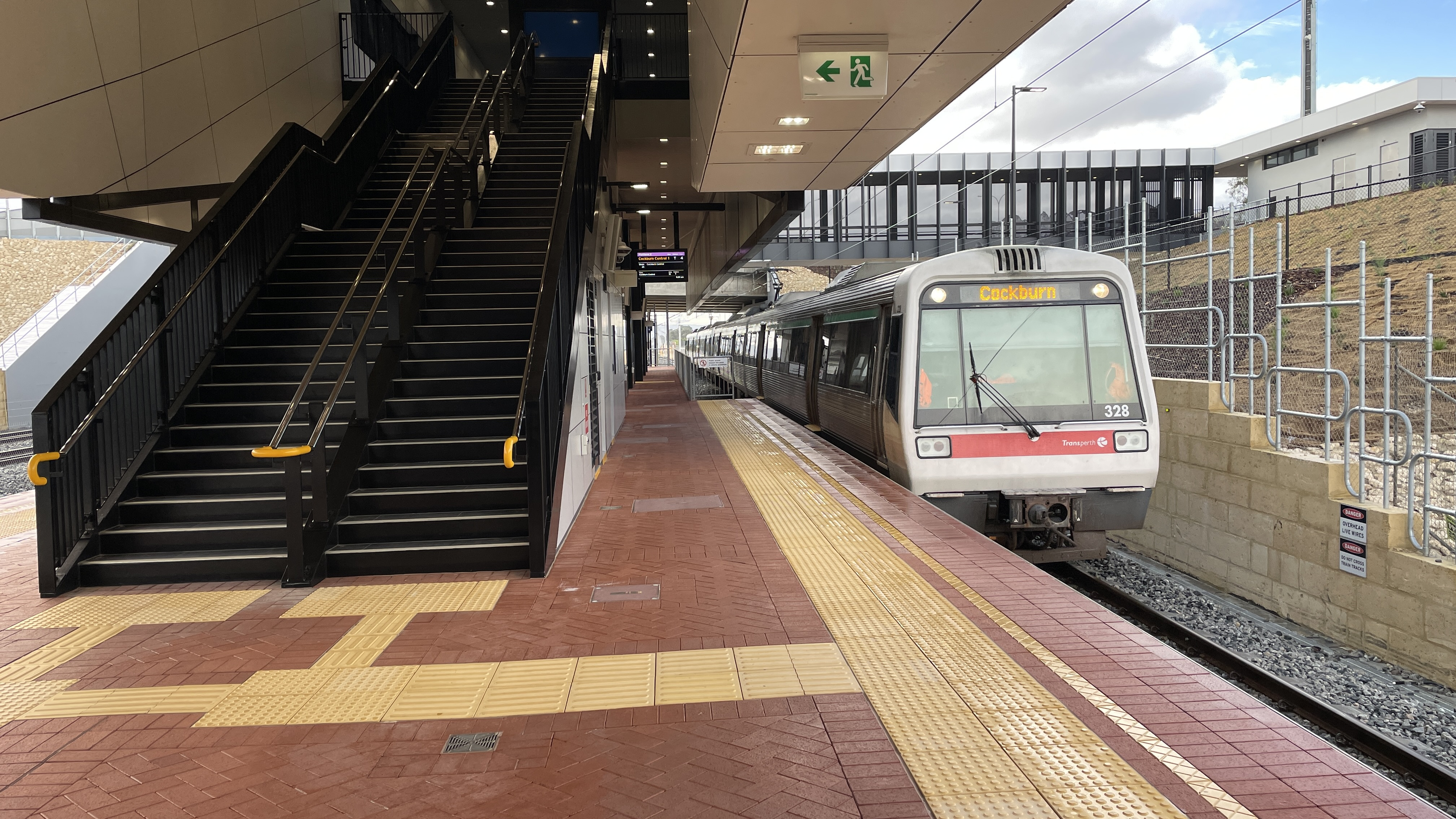
Transperth A-series train arrives on Platform 2

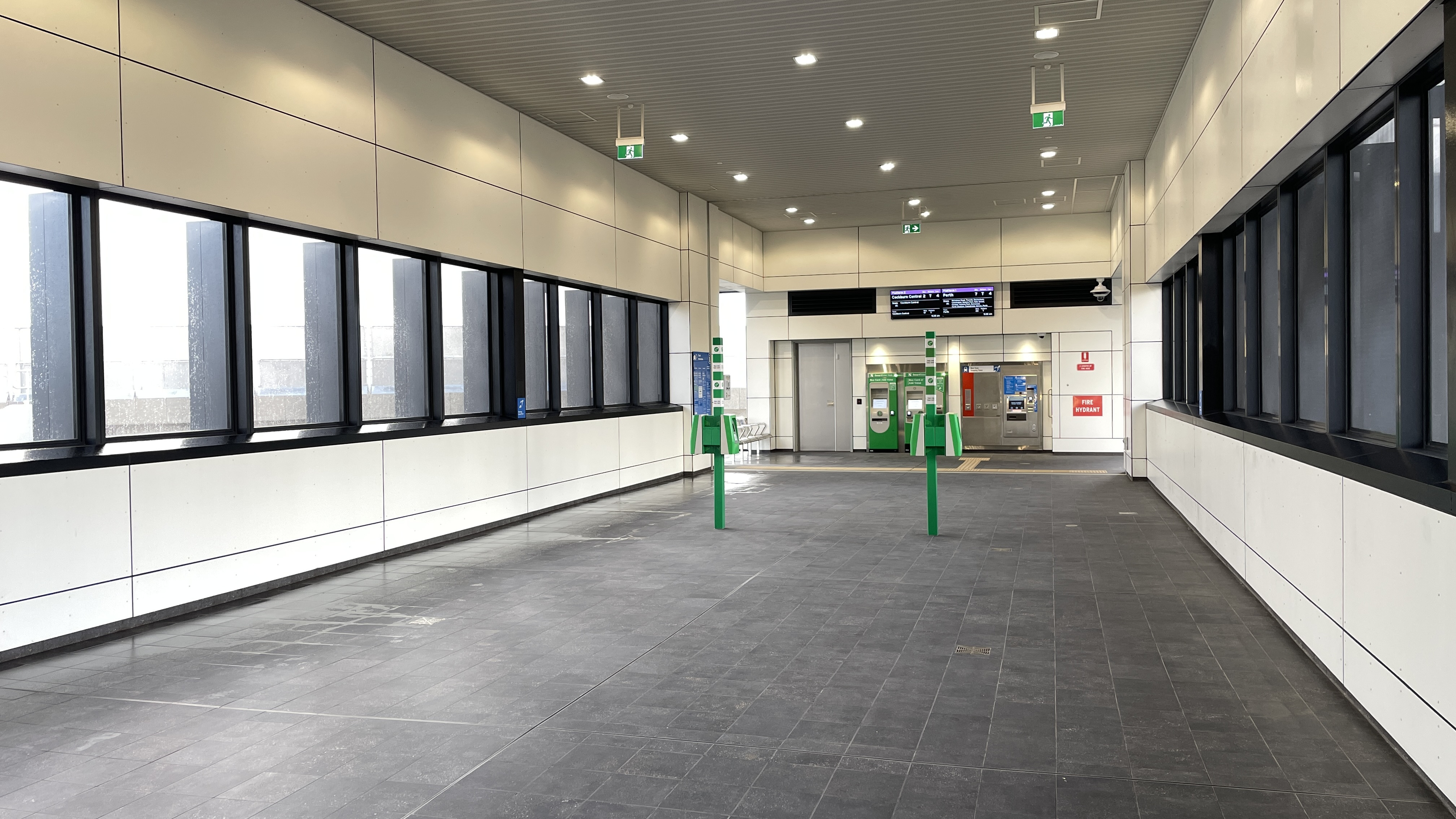
Concourse

A station at Ranford Road, referred to during planning as Canning Vale station, was first proposed as part of the planned Armadale line branch route of the Mandurah line. This station was ultimately not constructed as the final route was altered to a different alignment.

Construction of the station started in 2020, with the station opening on 8 June 2025.

At the 2021–22 State Budget, it was announced that the Thornlie–Cockburn link had been deferred by 12 months, as a result of Western Australia's skills shortage. This was alongside the deferment of 15 other state government infrastructure projects. The revised opening date was late 2024. In August 2022, it was announced that the Thornlie–Cockburn link had been delayed until mid-2025. In March 2025, it was announced that the station would open on 8 June 2025.

== Services ==
Ranford Road platform arrangement
Stop ID	Platform	Line	Destination	Via	Stopping Pattern	Notes
99381	1	Thornlie-Cockburn line	Perth		All stations, TP	
99382	2	Thornlie-Cockburn line	Cockburn Central		All stations	
