= Nicholson Road railway station =

Station in Perth, Western Australia

Nicholson Road
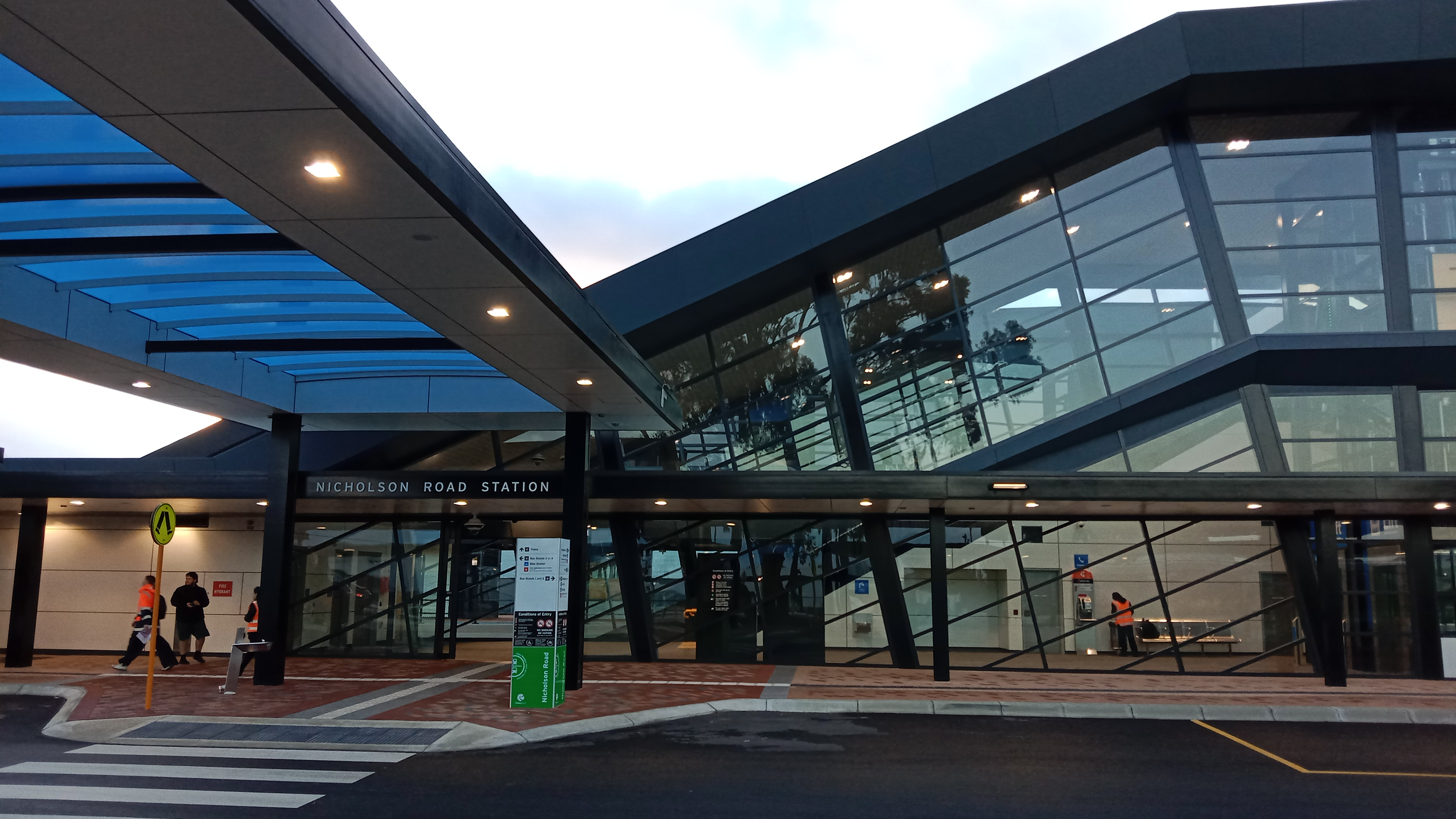
- Front of the station

General information
- Location: Nicholson Road, Canning Vale; Australia
- Coordinates: 32°03′40″S 115°56′05″E
- Owner: Public Transport Authority
- Operator: Transperth
- Line: Thornlie–Cockburn line
- Platforms: 2 (1 island)
- Tracks: 2
- Bus stands: 7
- Connections: Bus

Construction
- Structure type: Ground
- Parking: Yes
- Accessible: Yes

History
- Opened: 8 June 2025

Services
Preceding station	Transperth	Following station
Thornlie towards Perth	Thornlie–Cockburn line	Ranford Road towards Cockburn Central
Events
Thornlie towards Perth Stadium	Mandurah line Stadium special	Ranford Road towards Rockingham or Mandurah
Location
- Location of Nicholson Road railway station

Nicholson Road railway station is a railway station on the Thornlie–Cockburn line in Perth, Western Australia. It opened on 8 June 2025.

The station includes a bus interchange with 7 stands, and 1,000 car parking spaces. The station is at-grade, with pedestrian and bicycle access from a new shared path along Canna Drive or via the Nicholson Road underpass, and vehicle and bus access from Tulloch Way and Panama Street. Approximately 2,350 daily boardings are predicted at Nicholson Road railway station in 2031. Services to Perth and Cockburn Central are provided by Transperth Trains, with the journey to Perth taking approximately 26 minutes. It is 28 minutes to Perth via the Mandurah line.

== History ==
A station at Nicholson Road was first planned as part of the proposed Armadale line branch route of the Mandurah line. This station was ultimately not constructed as the final route was altered to a different alignment.

Construction of the station started in 2020, with the station opening on 8 June 2025.

At the 2021–22 State Budget, it was announced that the Thornlie–Cockburn link had been deferred by 12 months, as a result of Western Australia's skills shortage. This was alongside the deferment of 15 other state government infrastructure projects. The revised opening date was late 2024. In August 2022, it was announced that the Thornlie–Cockburn link had been delayed until 2025. In March 2025, it was announced that the station would open on 8 June 2025.

== Services ==
Nicholson Road platform arrangement
Stop ID	Platform	Line	Destination	Via	Stopping Pattern	Notes
99371	1	Thornlie-Cockburn line	Perth		All stations, TP	
99372	2	Thornlie-Cockburn line	Cockburn Central		All stations	
