= Rossmoyne Senior High School =

School in Bull Creek, Western Australia

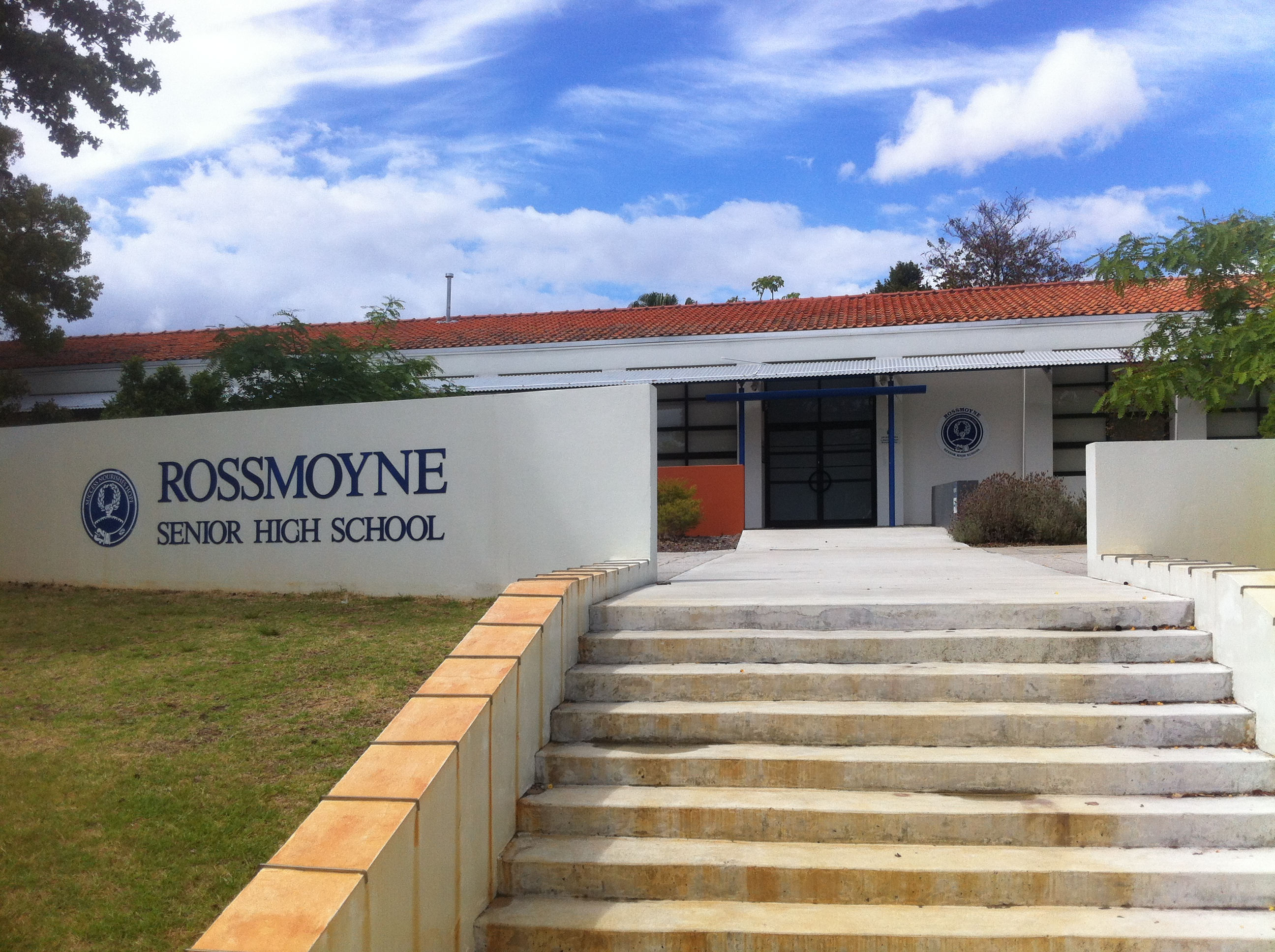
- Main entrance and administration area

Location
- Rossmoyne; Australia; 32°02′45″S 115°52′12″E

Information
- Type: Public co-educational high school
- Motto: Success nourishes hope
- Established: 1967; 59 years ago
- Educational authority: WA Department of Education
- Principal: Alan Brown
- Staff: 217.6 (11 May 2024)
- Years: 7–12
- Enrolment: 2,694 (11 May 2024)
- Campus: Suburban
- Colours: Blue and white, Barra of MacNeil tartan
- Website: www.rossmoyne.wa.edu.au

Rossmoyne Senior High School is a public co-educational high school in the City of Melville, located on Keith Road, Bull Creek, a southern riverside suburb of Perth, Western Australia. Founded in 1968, it is currently the largest school in Western Australia, with 2836 enrolled students in 2026.

== History ==
Construction of Rossmoyne Senior High School commenced in 1967 on land that was owned by the Webb family who originally came from Scotland. It opened for students the following year (1968). The school is located on Keith Road in Bull Creek but was named after the suburb that had grown rapidly around the school site. Keith Road was named after Keith Roberts, the school’s first Head Boy, who died in a traffic accident on his way home from football training on 22 June 1971.

Over the years the student catchment areas for Rossmoyne Senior High School were from Lynwood, Willetton, Riverton, Shelley, Bull Creek, Ferndale, southern end of Mount Pleasant, Booragoon and Brentwood. Now Rossmoyne Senior High School has restricted its mainstream intake to students from Rossmoyne, parts of Bull Creek and Willetton, Riverton, Shelley, Brentwood and Bateman, although it also runs a gifted and talented programme for academically gifted students. Students from years seven to ten (inclusive) are required to study a foreign language, with a choice of Chinese, German, French, and Japanese.

A fire at the school caused A$500,000 worth of damage in 2008. The blaze destroyed a double demountable classroom with furniture and computer equipment. The arson squad investigated the cause.

== Campus ==
The original section of the school is made up of several two storey buildings that together make a "H" shape. The administration block is on the northern side. Humanities & Social Sciences are on the western side. Home Economics, Woodwork, Metalwork and Arts are on the eastern side. Coming in from Keith Road, is an oval where students have Physical Education classes and the Performing Arts Centre, opened in 2004. At the southern side of the school there is a tennis court with basketball hoops, gymnasium, swimming pool and recently installed beach volleyball courts. Underneath the gymnasium is a dance studio which has female and male change-rooms. In the centre lies the library.

The School is also currently undergoing extensive reconstruction with plans to rebuild the school entirely in Four Stages. The Science Building was completed 2007 to provide more rooms for the core subject of sciences. This block, along with the Performing and Visual Arts Centre (PVAC for short), was part of Stage 1 of the Building Plan.

In 2012, Stage 2 of the Building Plan was completed, which involved a new English and Languages block, a tiered Amphitheatre, a new cafeteria known as "Pereira's Cafe" and an extension of the Performing Arts Centre. On the other side of the school an international-sized soccer field was laid out on the land that was formerly occupied by the ageing demountable buildings. A Health and Well-being Centre was built in 2013 which is considered an extension to the Gymnasium.

Other than these new buildings, Current Visual Arts Classrooms (Room 50 and 53) were converted to normal classrooms and there was landscaping to the new courtyards. A Selection Panel consisting of parents, community and school representatives has selected an artist who has been commissioned to design and install art works for the new building: including an extensive feature screen on the proposed colonnade connecting the new buildings.

As of 2013, construction of Stage 3 is underway, which involved building a block for Year 7s in preparation of their move from primary to high school in 2015. A new access road from the Apsley Road/Karel Avenue intersection, with student 'drop-off' zone, and bus zone was also added. Since 2017, the year 7 building has been relabelled as the mathematics building, seeing use from all year levels.

As of 2019, all classrooms were appropriately renamed to indicate their location, in an effort to facilitate navigation for students. Year 9s have been relocated to the west side of the school. In addition, the Year 8s and 10s have been relocated to a single quadrangle together. Room D33 has been demolished to make way for rooms OB1 and OB2.

== Academic ranking, Western Australia ==
In 2001, the school was named The Australian newspaper's School Of The Year, ahead of one of the country's most exclusive private schools – Methodist Ladies' College in Melbourne.

In the 2009 Western Australian Tertiary Entrance Examinations, Rossmoyne Senior High School had more students with a tertiary entrance rank of 99.95%, the highest possible rank, than any other school in the state.

The school has performed consistently well in the WACE school rankings and is often the best performing amongst all of the public schools in the state.

WA school ATAR ranking
Year	Rank	Median ATAR	Eligible students	Students with ATAR	% students with ATAR
2018	8	89.45	349	288	82.52
2017	15	88.95	349	288	82.52
2016	15	87.35	366	310	84.70

Year 12 student achievement data
Year	Rank (Note: Ranking of school compared to other schools in the state)	% +75 in WACE (Note: Based on the number of Stage 3 course enrolments in the school where a WACE course score of 75 or above was achieved)	Rank	% +65 in WACE (Note: Based on the number of Stage 3 course enrolments in the school where a WACE course score of 65 or above was achieved)	% graduates (Note: Percentage of Year 12 cohort that graduated with a WACE certificate)
2015	18	19.00	23	43.89	99.45
2014	17	19.11	18	46.22	99.16
2013	13	17.63	15	44.85	98.88
2012	13	21.26	13	51.54	96.68
2011	14	22.41	23	55.34	98.77
2010	16	21.18	23	56.91	99.05
2009	14	44.76 (>75% minimum of one subject)	14	51.49 (64.6% or more)	98.92

Beazley Medal

In 2017, Isabel Longbottom won the Beazley Medal for the top ranked WACE student.

== Administration ==
Rossmoyne Senior High School's principal since 2021 is Alan Brown.

== Notable alumni ==
=== Rhodes Scholars ===
- 1985: Grant Donaldson
- 1988: Ian Reid
- 1999: Craig Wood

=== Arts ===
- Glyn Parry – writer of children's literature, young adult fiction and speculative fiction
- Gary Twinn – musician (Supernaut, Twenty Flight Rockers, The International Swingers)
- Amberley Lobo – TV presenter

=== Business and law ===
- Grant Donaldson – Solicitor General of Western Australia
- Corryn Rayney – registrar of Supreme Court of Western Australia who was found dead in Kings Park. Her death is still unsolved as of 2022.
- Rob Scott – Wesfarmers Managing Director from 2017
- Derek Lau – MasterChef Australia contestant 2019

=== Sport ===
- Grant Boxall – wheelchair rugby player, Athens Paralympics 2004 & Beijing Paralympics 2008
- Jason Diederich – swimmer, Seoul Paralympics 1988 & Barcelona Paralympics 1992
- David Ferguson – Olympic indoor volleyballer, Athens 2004
- Jo-Ann Galbraith – Olympic archery, Athens 2004
- Heritier Lumumba – footballer, Collingwood & Melbourne
- Jackie Pereira – Olympic hockey player, Seoul 1988, Barcelona 1992 & Atlanta 1996
- Julien Prosser – Olympic beach volleyballer, Atlanta 1996, Sydney 2000 & Athens 2004
- Rob Scott – silver medalist rower, Atlanta 1996
- Vanessa Ward – Olympic athlete, Los Angeles 1984 & Seoul 1988

== See also ==
- List of schools in the Perth metropolitan area
