= Leach Highway =

Highway in Perth, Western Australia

Leach Highway Western Australia
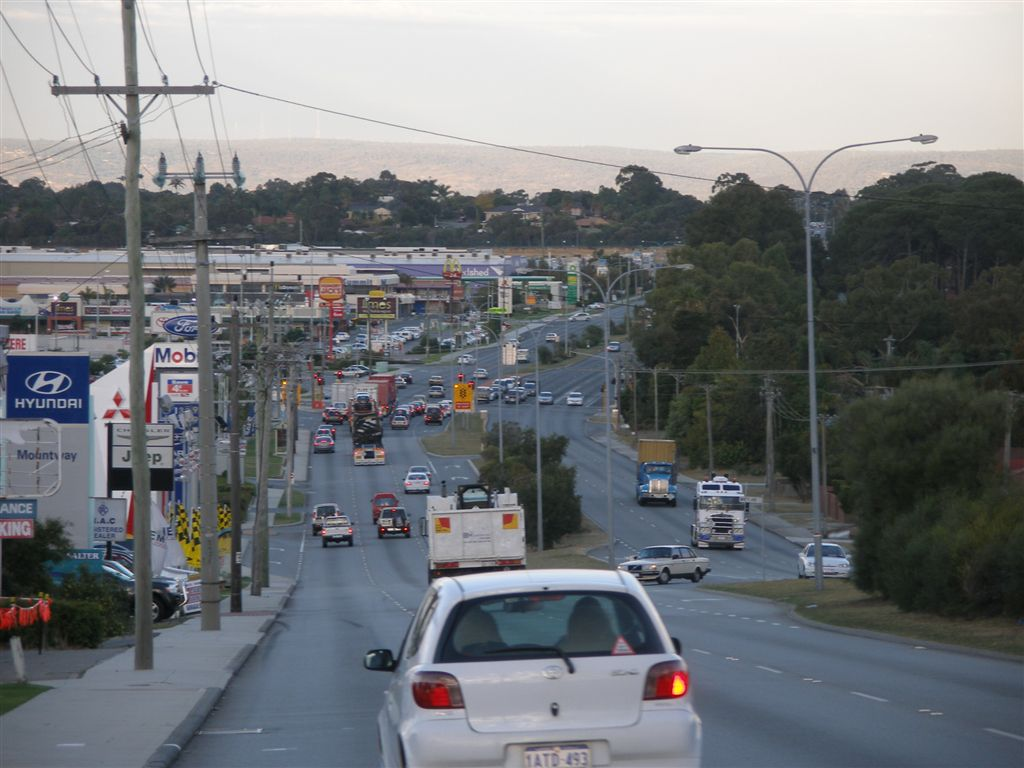
- Leach Highway in Melville

General information
- Type: Highway
- Length: 23 km (14 mi)
- Route number(s): State Route 7 (all sections); National Route 1 (Kwinana Freeway – Stock Road)

Major junctions
- East end: Airport Drive, Perth Airport
- Tonkin Highway (State Route 4); Orrong Road (State Route 8); Albany Highway (State Route 30); Manning Road (State Route 26); High Road (State Route 27); Kwinana Freeway (State Route 2); Stock Road (National Route 1)
- West end: High Street (State Route 7), Palmyra

Location(s)
- Major suburbs: Welshpool, Wilson, Rossmoyne, Winthrop, Melville

Highway system
- Highways in Australia; National Highway • Freeways in Australia; Highways in Western Australia

Leach Highway is a 23-kilometre (14 mi) east-west arterial highway in the southern suburbs of Perth, Western Australia, primarily linking Kewdale and Perth Airport with the city of Fremantle.

It is allocated State Route 7 and is a dual carriageway for its entire length. Leach Highway varies in width between four and six lanes, with speed limits of 70 and 80 km/h (43 and 50 mph).

== Route description ==
Leach Highway is one of the state's most important heavy vehicle routes. It links the major industrial areas of Kewdale and Welshpool with Western Australia's major container port at Fremantle.

Although the Leach Highway's western terminus is at Carrington Street in Palmyra, High Street continues for a further 1.5 km (0.9 mi) into Fremantle, and connects it to the Stirling Highway.

== History ==
The Leach Highway is named after former Commissioner of Main Roads Western Australia Digby Leach. Construction began in 1966, with the first section opened between its present western terminus at Carrington Street, Melville (now Palmyra), and High Road in Canning (now Willetton) in 1972.

It was soon extended eastward from High Road through to Manning Road, utilising the old timber Riverton Bridge over the Canning River via Barbican Street East and what is now Fern Road and Grayson Court. On 18 October 1976 it was further extended from Manning Road to Orrong Road, including bridges over Albany Highway in Bentley and the South Western railway line in Welshpool. Then in 1978 the 4-lane concrete Shelley Bridge over Canning River opened, with Riverton Bridge retained for local traffic.

In the early 1980s the highway was extended further eastward, first to Hardey Road and, soon thereafter, to the new Beechboro-Gosnells Highway (now called Tonkin Highway) which remains as the highway's present eastern terminus.

Also around that time a number of intersections were built to coincide with new roads being built around Leach Highway. A parclo interchange was constructed at the newly extended Kwinana Freeway, and an intersection was constructed for the new Centenary Avenue in Wilson to improve access to Curtin University. New at-grade intersections were built at Murdoch Drive and Winthrop Drive to service the new suburbs of Bateman and Winthrop.

Although not strictly Leach Highway, in 1985 Stirling Highway was extended southwards from its then terminus at Canning Highway to a new terminus at High Street (an extension of Leach Highway). This marked the final piece of an improved freight link between the Port of Fremantle and Perth's major industrial areas around Kewdale.

Apart from minor modifications, the Leach Highway remained largely unchanged until 2005/2006 when work on projects at Kwinana Freeway and Orrong Road commenced.

=== Orrong Road interchange ===
In November 2005, the state government announced plans for the construction of a $21 million diamond interchange at the intersection of Leach Highway and Orrong Road in Welshpool. Orrong Road, which is a continuation of Graham Farmer Freeway has experienced an increase in traffic by approximately 40% since the freeway was completed in 2000. The new bridge brought Leach Highway over Orrong Road, allowing, at the time, free-flowing traffic from Welshpool Road to Abernethy Road. The intersection was formerly Perth's worst blackspot. Approximately 70,000 vehicles, including substantial numbers of trucks, use the intersection daily. Funding for the project was made available through the sale of land reserved for the Fremantle Eastern Bypass. The interchange was completed in July 2007.

=== Bull Creek railway station ===
Bull Creek railway station was built at the interchange of Leach Highway and Kwinana Freeway for the new Perth-Mandurah railway. A new bridge was built immediately south of the present highway bridge to cater for bus access to the railway station. Alterations to the Kwinana Freeway on and off ramps to Leach Highway have also been undertaken, entailing modifications to the layout of the parclo interchange.

=== Gateway WA ===
As part of the Gateway WA project, which commenced in 2013 and was completed in March 2016, Leach Highway was upgraded to a controlled access four lane expressway from Orrong Road into Perth Airport Terminals 1 and 2, through Airport Drive. This involved Perth's first full freeway to freeway interchange with Tonkin Highway and a compact diamond interchange with Abernethy Road. Airport Drive will also provide a major link to the planned consolidated Perth Airport complex.

== Future upgrades ==
=== Welshpool Road interchange ===
In February 2018, then Federal Opposition transport and infrastructure spokesman Anthony Albanese pledged to put $46.5 million toward upgrading the Leach Highway and Welshpool Road to a grade-separated interchange if Labor won the upcoming Federal election. The intersection is considered to be one of Perth's most congested, with a high number of crashes occurring. The cost of the upgrade was at the time estimated to cost $93 million

In 2021, construction on site has started, continuing into 2023. The initial plan was to construct an overpass of Leach Highway over Welshpool Road, with a roundabout-interchange constructed below the overpass. It also included upgrading the bridge over the railway line leading to Armadale and also improving pedestrian access via sidewalks. Currently, the overpass has been constructed and more minor modifications will continue into 2023.

== Major interchanges and exits ==
Most of Leach Highway west of Manning Road is not limited access, meaning a large number of the roads that Leach Highway are connected to are not controlled. Major intersections are at-grade and controlled. East of Manning Road sees Leach Highway become more expressway-standard, however, and Albany Highway, Welshpool Road, Orrong Road, and Abernethy Road are all grade separated interchanges in favour of Leach Highway. Although also grade-separated, the Centenary Avenue interchange is controlled by traffic lights on the westbound side of the highway.

LGA	Location	km	mi	Destinations	Notes
Belmont	Perth Airport, Cloverdale, Kewdale tripoint	0.00	0.00	Tonkin Highway (State Route 4) – Morley, Ellenbrook, Armadale, Perth Airport terminals T3/T4	Grand Gateway interchange; modified combination interchange; northbound-to-westbound controlled by traffic lights at the Leach Highway/Abernethy Road interchange due to close distance to Abernethy Road interchange. Leach Highway eastbound terminus, continues as Airport Drive northeastbound to Perth Airport terminals T1/T2
Belmont	Cloverdale, Kewdale boundary	1.40	0.87	Abernethy Road (State Route 55) – Belmont, Hazelmere	Single-point urban interchange, also handles Tonkin northbound to Leach westbound traffic prior to merging to avoid the need for weaving.
Belmont–Canning boundary	Kewdale, Welshpool boundary	3.3	2.1	Orrong Road (State Route 8) – Perth, Burswood, Kalamunda	Signalised diamond interchange.
Canning	Welshpool	4.4	2.7	Welshpool Road – East Victoria Park, East Cannington	Roundabout interchange.
Canning	Bentley	6.1	3.8	Albany Highway (State Route 30) – Perth, Victoria Park, Cannington, Albany	Signalised diamond interchange.
Canning	Bentley, Wilson boundary	6.7	4.2	Manning Road (State Route 26) – Manning, Waterford, Cannington	
Canning	Wilson	7.8	4.8	Bungaree Road	
Canning	Wilson	8.6	5.3	Centenary Avenue – Curtin University	Modified parclo interchange, Leach eastbound free flowing while Leach westbound has a signalised intersection with the Centenary Avenue onramp. All three other ramps are uncontrolled, meeting to the north at a signalised intersection with a bus lane priority arrangement in place.
Canning River		8.8– 9.1	5.5– 5.7	Shelley Bridge	
Canning	Shelley	10.1	6.3	Barbican Street West west / Vahland Avenue south – Willetton, Leeming	
Canning	Riverton, Shelley, Willetton tripoint	11.7	7.3	High Road (State Route 27) – Parkwood, Lynwood	
Canning	Rossmoyne, Willetton boundary	12.4	7.7	Karel Avenue – Bull Creek, Leeming, Jandakot Airport	
Canning–Melville boundary	Rossmoyne, Bull Creek boundary	13.0	8.1	Webb Street	
Melville	Brentwood, Bull Creek boundary	13.8	8.6	Bull Creek Drive	
Melville	Brentwood–Bateman–Bull Creek tripoint	14.1– 14.5	8.8– 9.0	Kwinana Freeway (National Route 1 northbound only/ State Route 2) – Perth, Joondalup, Rockingham	National Route 1 eastern concurrency terminus; modified Parclo interchange with Leach westbound to Kwinana northbound and Leach eastbound to Kwinana southbound looped: access to Bull Creek railway station
Melville	Brentwood–Bateman boundary	15.0	9.3	Moolyeen Road – Mount Pleasant, Applecross	
Melville	Bateman–Booragoon–Winthrop tripoint	15.3	9.5	Murdoch Drive – Murdoch, Murdoch University	
Melville	Booragoon–Winthrop boundary	16.0	9.9	Riseley Street – Ardross	
Melville	Booragoon–Winthrop boundary	17.0	10.6	Winthrop Drive – Kardinya	
Melville	Myaree–Winthrop boundary	17.3	10.7	Norma Road	No right turn from Norma Road to Leach Highway westbound
Melville	Myaree–Winthrop–Willagee tripoint	17.9	11.1	North Lake Road – Alfred Cove, Kardinya, Cockburn Central	
Melville	Melville–Palmyra–Willagee boundary	20.0	12.4	Stock Road (National Route 1) – Attadale, O'Connor, Rockingham	National Route 1 western concurrency terminus
Melville–Fremantle boundary	Palmyra–Fremantle boundary	21.4	13.3	Carrington Street – Bicton, White Gum Valley, Hamilton Hill	Leach Highway westbound terminus, continues as High Street (State Route 7) to Fremantle
Concurrency terminus; Incomplete access

== See also ==
- Highways in Australia
- Highways in Western Australia
- Freeways in Australia
- Freeways in Western Australia
