= North Lake Road =

Road in Perth, Western Australia

North Lake Road Western Australia
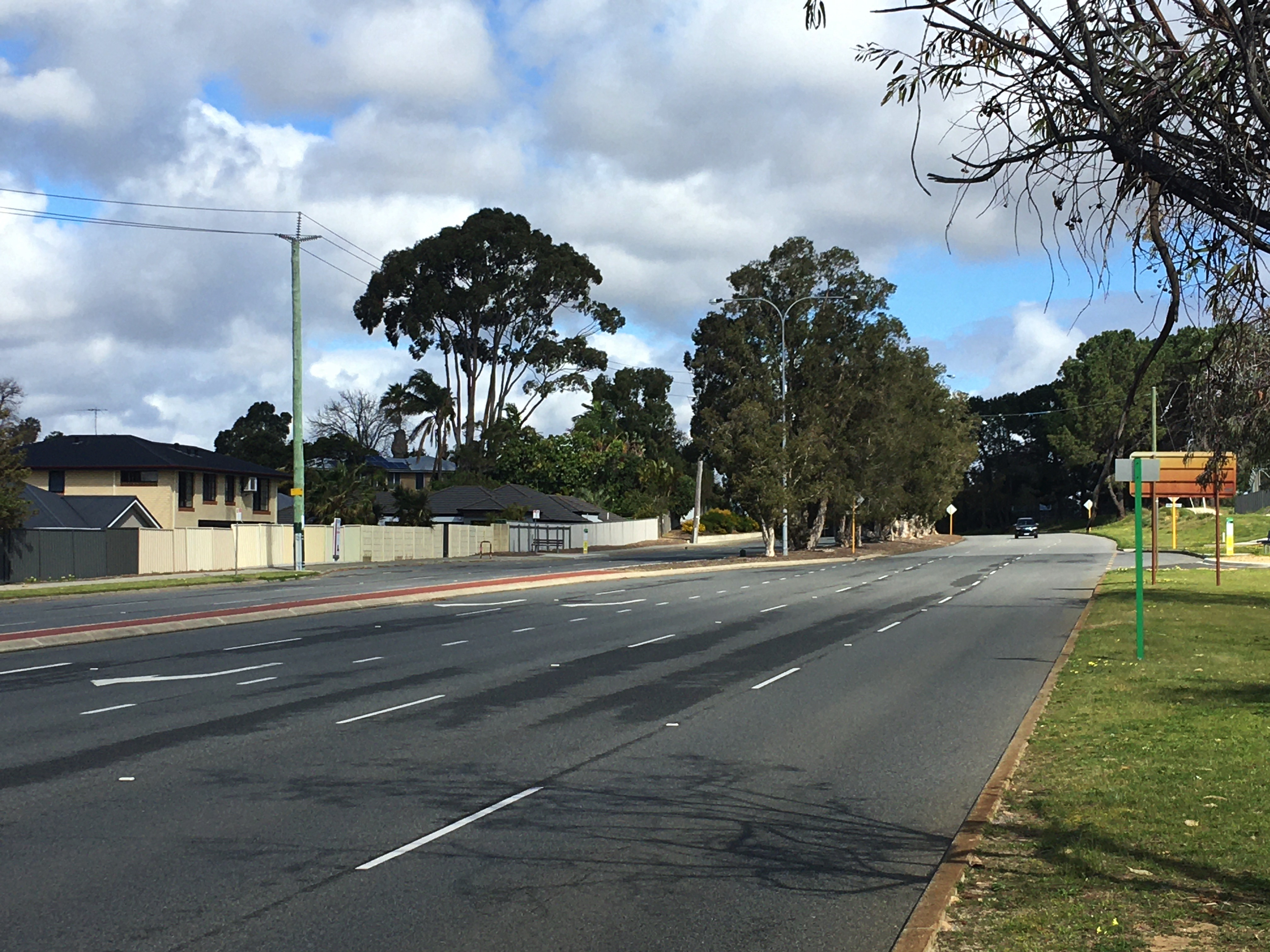
- North Lake Road facing south in Kardinya

General information
- Type: Road
- Length: 12.5 km (7.8 mi)

Major junctions
- North end: Canning Highway (State Route 6), Alfred Cove
- Leach Highway (National Route 1, State Route 7); South Street (State Route 13); Phoenix Road; Kwinana Freeway (State Route 2)
- South East end: Armadale Road (State Route 14), Cockburn Central

Location(s)
- Major suburbs: Kardinya, Bibra Lake, South Lake

North Lake Road is a major road in the southwestern suburbs of the Perth metropolitan area functioning as an intermediate arterial collector positioned between the limited-access Stock Road to the west and Kwinana Freeway to the east. North Lake Road's northern terminus is at Canning Highway with its southern end at Armadale Road with the Kwinana Freeway exit as of December 2021. North Lake Road was part of the old State Route 14 until the early 2010s when upgrades and extensions to the more south-westerly Spearwood Avenue and Beeliar Drive resulted in its status being revoked.

North Lake Road varies between a four to six-lane dual carriageway except for a two lane section north of Marmion Street. The northbound carriageway is three lanes between Leach Highway and Winterfold Road while the southbound's three lane section is longer but further south between Somerville Boulevard and Phoenix Road.

== History ==
North Lake Road was developed in the late 19th Century in line with the wider City of Melville area. It was the main northern access road to the Beeliar Wetlands, particularly Bibra Lake, with two smaller lakes to the north and south. North Lake Road terminated at an intersection with Forrest Road, at the time the main west–east road connection between Fremantle and Armadale and followed the now defunct Spearwood–Armadale railway line. North Lake Road also marked the western boundary of a pine plantation owned by the University of Western Australia.

As Perth expanded southwards in the 1970-1980s a new corridor was developed to the west of the existing route to cater for the expected development of residential areas in suburbs such as Winthrop, Kardinya and Coolbellup, industrial and tourism developments in the suburb of Bibra Lake while at the same time also trying to relocate heavy traffic away from the wetlands. In the 1990s the extension of the Kwinana Freeway severed the original Forrest Road connection. The name North Lake Road would be used as the western section from the original terminus at Forrest Road and would curve south to the realigned intersection with the newly constructed Beeliar Drive. The section east of the freeway would be renamed to Armadale Road. The renaming effectively doubled the length of North Lake Road as a result.

By 2008, the remaining sections of the renamed North Lake Road were a single carriageway from Beeliar Drive to Hammond Road and again from Bibra Drive to Discovery Drive. In 2009, the northern section (Bibra to Discovery) upgraded to a dual carriageway. In the early 2010s, North Lake Road had its state route status revoked and was passed on further to Beeliar Drive and then to Spearwood Avenue, which was then-recently extended. Despite the revocation the road would continue to see major upgrades. In 2013, North Lake Road would be realigned southeast of Kentucky Court to terminate just west of the Kwinana Freeway and recurve to provide bus-only access to the Cockburn Central railway station. The original southern alignment was four-laned and renamed Midgegooroo Avenue. The remaining section between Midgegoroo Avenue and Hammond Road was duplicated in 2016. In late 2021 a half-diamond interchange and flyover was built to provide direct access to the Kwinana Freeway and Armadale Road, in effect restoring the old Forrest Road connection severed nearly 30 years ago.

The old North Lake Road alignment, between Archibald Street in Willagee and Elderberry Drive in South Lake, remains as a set of mostly discontinuous local roads.

- Freedman Way from Archibald Street to Somerville Boulevard.
- Gilbertson Road from Somerville Boulevard to Farrington Road
- Progress Drive from Farrington Road to Bibra Drive
- Prout Way from Bibra Drive to the Kwinana freight railway
- Little Rush Close from the Kwinana freight railway to Elderberry Drive

== Major Intersections ==
All intersections listed are controlled by traffic signals unless otherwise indicated.

LGA	Location	km	mi	Destinations	Notes
Melville	Alfred Cove–Attadale boundary	0.00	0.00	Canning Highway (State Route 6) – Midland, Perth, Como, Fremantle	Northern terminus
Melville	Myaree	1.0	0.62	Marmion Street – Booragoon, Melville, Fremantle	
Melville	Myaree	1.4	0.87	McCoy Street – Melville	
Melville	Myaree–Winthrop–Willagee tripoint	1.7	1.1	Leach Highway (National Route 1) (State Route 7) Fremantle, Willetton, Welshpool, Perth Airport	
Melville	Winthrop–Kardinya boundary	3.2	2.0	Somerville Boulevard – Bateman	
Melville	Kardinya	4.2	2.6	South Street (State Route 13) Fremantle, Murdoch, Canning Vale, Armadale	
Melville-Cockburn boundary	Kardinya–North Lake–Coolbellup tripoint	5.2	3.2	Farrington Road – Murdoch, Leeming	
Cockburn	Bibra Lake	6.7	4.2	Forrest Road west/Gwilliam Drive east – Hamilton Hill, Fremantle	Access to Adventure World
Cockburn	Bibra Lake	7.0	4.3	Phoenix Road – Spearwood, North Coogee	
Cockburn	Bibra Lake	8.4	5.2	Bibra Drive – North Lake, Murdoch	Roundabout intersection. Access to Cockburn Ice Arena.
Cockburn	South Lake–Yangebup boundary	9.3	5.8	Omeo Street	
Cockburn	South Lake–Yangebup boundary	9.9	6.2	Osprey Drive – Beeliar	
Cockburn	South Lake–Yangebup boundary	10.3	6.4	Berrigan Drive – Jandakot, Treeby, Jandakot Airport	Access to the Kwinana Freeway southbound
Cockburn	South Lake–Cockburn Central boundary	10.8	6.7	Hammond Road – Success, Hammond Park	Unsignalised T-junction
Cockburn	Cockburn Central	12.3	7.6	Midgegooroo Avenue south/Kentucky Court north – Success, Atwell, Rockingham, Mandurah	Access to Kwinana Freeway southbound (via Beeliar Drive (State Route 14)), Cockburn Central railway station and Gateways Shopping Centre
Cockburn	Jandakot–Cockburn Central boundary	12.5	7.8	Kwinana Freeway (State Route 2) – Perth, Jandakot, Forrestdale, Armadale	Southern terminus. Continues east as Armadale Road. Half-diamond interchange (northbound entry & southbound exit) for non-bus traffic, direct bus only access to Cockburn Central railway station.
1.000 mi = 1.609 km; 1.000 km = 0.621 mi: Incomplete access
