= Electoral results for the district of Bicton =

Western Australian district election results

This is a list of electoral results for the electoral district of Bicton in Western Australian state elections.

== Members for Bicton ==
Member	Party	Term
Lisa O'Malley	Labor	2017–present

== Election results ==
=== Elections in the 2020s ===
2025 Western Australian state election: Bicton
Party	Candidate	Votes	%	±%
Labor	Lisa O'Malley	12,438	45.1	−11.2
Liberal	Chris Dowson	9,562	34.7	+4.6
Greens	Adam Bennett	3,982	14.5	+5.3
One Nation	Tim Smith	868	3.2	+1.8
National	Bill Koul	704	2.6	+2.6
Total formal votes		27,554	96.8	−0.6
Informal votes		914	3.2	+0.6
Turnout		28,468	89.3	+2.2
Two-party-preferred result
Labor	Lisa O'Malley	16,346	59.3	−6.8
Liberal	Chris Dowson	11,200	40.7	+6.8
Labor hold		Swing	−6.8	

2021 Western Australian state election: Bicton
Party	Candidate	Votes	%	±%
Labor	Lisa O'Malley	13,556	55.1	+15.2
Liberal	Nicole Robins	7,559	30.7	−11.6
Greens	Annie Hill Otness	2,450	10.0	−1.1
One Nation	Jonathon Graham	297	1.2	+1.2
No Mandatory Vaccination	Silvia Hirsbrunner	293	1.2	+1.2
Liberal Democrats	Michael Prinz	267	1.1	+1.1
Christians	Deonne Kingsford	185	0.8	−0.3
Total formal votes		24,607	97.5	+0.5
Informal votes		628	2.5	−0.5
Turnout		25,235	89.2	−0.3
Two-party-preferred result
Labor	Lisa O'Malley	16,136	65.6	+11.9
Liberal	Nicole Robins	8,466	34.4	−11.9
Labor hold		Swing	+11.9	

=== Elections in the 2010s ===
2017 Western Australian state election: Bicton
Party	Candidate	Votes	%	±%
Liberal	Matt Taylor	9,734	43.0	−9.9
Labor	Lisa O'Malley	8,955	39.6	+11.8
Greens	Louise Dickmann	2,406	10.6	−1.1
Independent	Steve Kepert	734	3.2	+3.2
Animal Justice	Colleen Saporita	325	1.4	+1.4
Christians	Stephen Wardell-Johnson	237	1.0	+1.0
Micro Business	Richard Korfanty	226	1.0	+1.0
Total formal votes		22,617	97.0	+2.1
Informal votes		695	3.0	−2.1
Turnout		23,312	89.6	+3.8
Two-party-preferred result
Labor	Lisa O'Malley	11,968	52.9	+13.0
Liberal	Matt Taylor	10,641	47.1	−13.0
Labor gain from Liberal		Swing	+13.0	
