= Myaree, Western Australia =

Myaree Perth, Western Australia
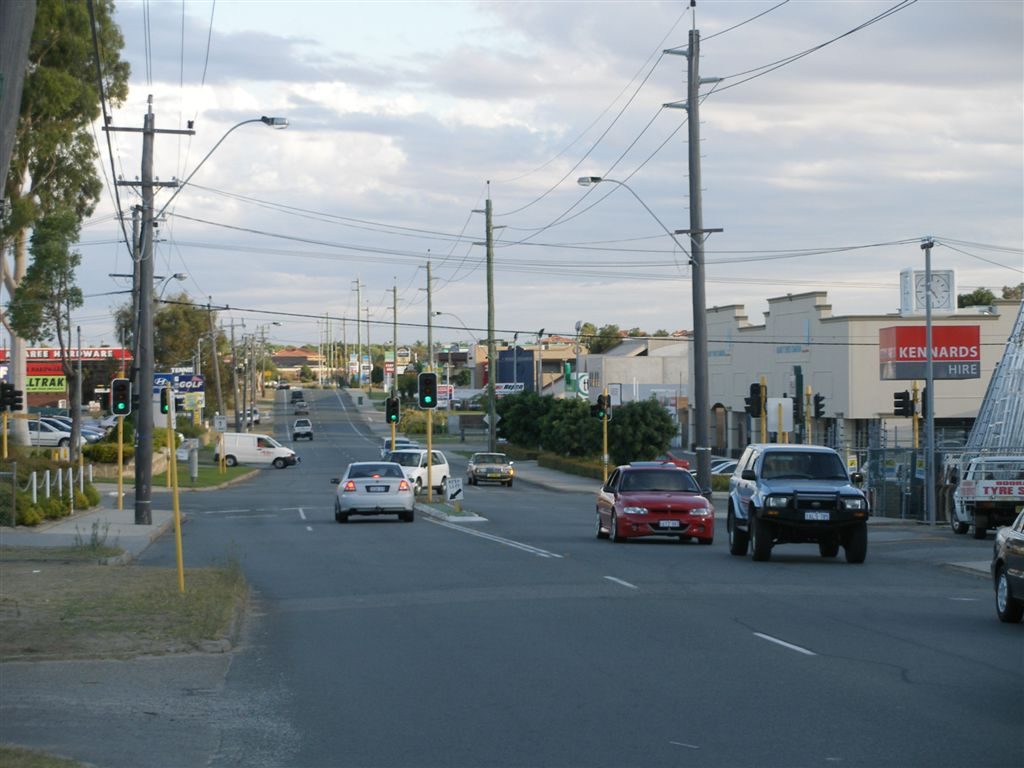
- Norma Road, Myaree
- Coordinates: 32.041°S 115.815°E
- Population: 2,105 (SAL 2021)
- Established: 1950s
- Postcode(s): 6154
- Location: 11 km (7 mi) from Perth
- LGA(s): City of Melville
- State electorate(s): Bateman / Bicton
- Federal division(s): Tangney
Suburbs around Myaree:
| Melville | Alfred Cove | Ardross |
| Melville | Myaree | Booragoon |
| Willagee | Winthrop | Winthrop |

Myaree is a suburb of Perth, Western Australia, located within the City of Melville. Myaree gets its name from an Aboriginal word meaning foliage.

Myaree is a predominantly light industrial area. When it was developed, roads were named after soldiers killed in World War I and early settlers in the area.

== Transport ==
=== Bus ===
- 114 Lake Coogee to Elizabeth Quay Bus Station – serves Marmion Street
- 160 Fremantle Station to WACA Ground – serves North Lake Road
- 502 Fremantle Station to Bull Creek Station – serves Leach Highway
- 915 Fremantle Station to Bull Creek Station (high frequency) – serves Marmion Street
