= Willagee, Western Australia =

Willagee
- Suburb
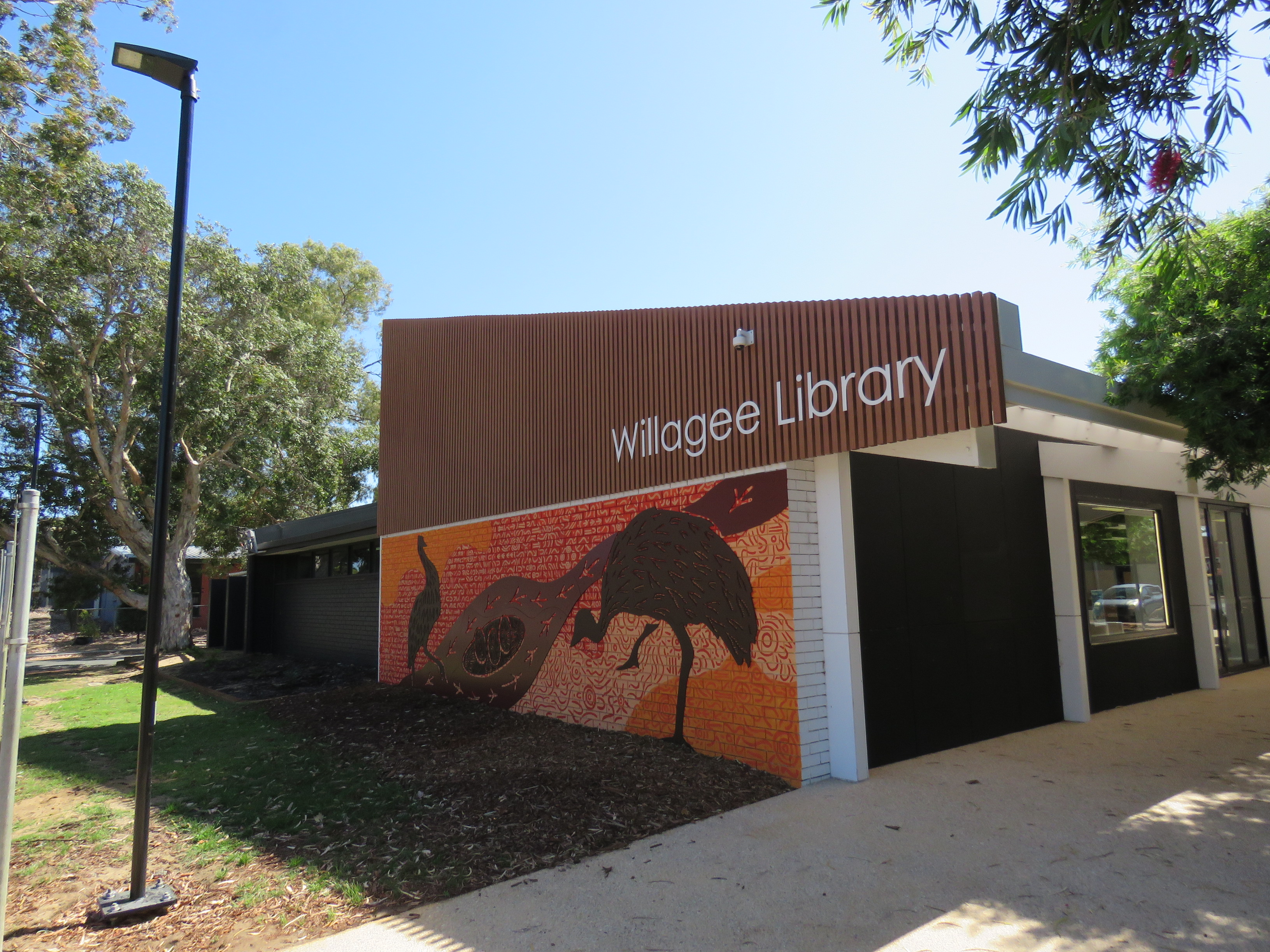
- Willagee Library
- Interactive map of Willagee
- Coordinates: 32°03′07″S 115°48′19″E
- Country: Australia
- State: Western Australia
- City: Perth
- LGA: City of Melville
- Location: 15 km (9.3 mi) from Perth
- Established: 1952

Government
  - State electorate: Bicton
  - Federal division: Tangney

Area
  - Total: 2.1 km^{2} (0.81 sq mi)

Population
  - Total: 5,447 (SAL 2021)
- Postcode: 6156
Suburbs around Willagee
Palmyra	Melville	Myaree
O'Connor	Willagee	Winthrop
O'Connor	Kardinya	Winthrop

Willagee is a suburb of Perth, Western Australia 15 kilometres (9 mi) south-southwest of the Perth central business district. It is within the local government area of City of Melville, and the former electoral district of Willagee, which takes its name from the suburb.

== History ==
Willagee is named after Willagee Swamp, the Noongar name of a now-reclaimed feature in the area. The suburb originally comprised a housing estate known as Willagee Park, created by the State Housing Commission. Willagee was brought into existence "primarily to provide accommodation for employees in the new industrial area being developed by the Fremantle City Council." Surveying and clearing of the land had commenced in December 1950, with a number of "first-class roads" constructed by the Melville Roads Board in 1951. A number of dwellings were prefabricated homes imported from Austria. The suburb is now characterised by demountable, wooden cottages with stilts (spears), although it is in the midst of a sweeping redevelopment plan, which is supposed to improve the quality of the housing.

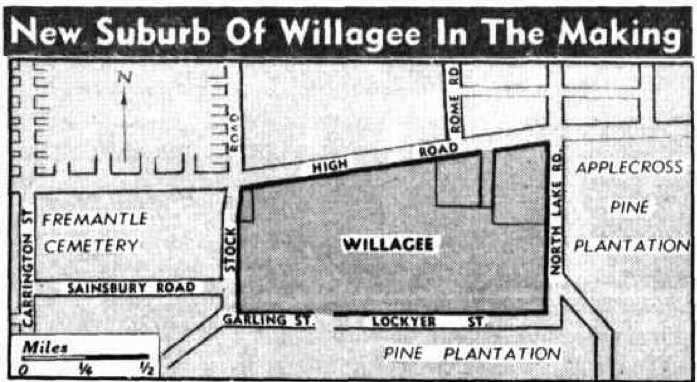
A map of the planned suburb of Willagee, published in the West Australian, 24 April 1952

== Geography ==
The suburb is bounded by Leach Highway to the north, Garling Street to the south, Stock Road to the west and North Lake Road to the east. Willagee borders Melville and Myaree to the north and north-east, Winthrop to the east, Kardinya to the south-east and south, O'Connor to the south and south-west, and Palmyra to the west and north-west.

=== Parks and reserves ===
There are ten parks and reserves located in Willagee: Arthur Kay Reserve, Harmony Park, Harry Bailey Park, Joan Williams Park, Roy Neal Reserve, Tony Zevela Park, Walter West Reserve, Webber Reserve, William Reynolds Reserve and Winnacott Reserve. The largest of these are Webber Reserve and Winnacott Reserve, which are both used by local sporting clubs, including the Willagee Bears Rugby League Football Club and the Winnacott Kats Junior Football Club.

== Facilities ==
Much of the suburb's facilities are centred along two main thoroughfares: Winnacott Street, running north–south, and Archibald Street, running east–west. A large precinct, consisting of a library, community centre, an IGA, post office and various other stores, is located at the junction of these two roads. A smaller shopping centre, Willagee Supermarket, is located at the intersection of Leach Highway and Stock Road, in the north-west corner of the suburb.

Caralee Community School was formed in 2005 from a merger of Willagee Primary School and Carawatha Primary School, and is currently attended by approximately 300 students. The school is located in Melville Senior High School's catchment area. The Fremantle Language Development Centre is also located at the site.

== Transport ==
Willagee is served by the 140, 160 and 502 Transperth bus routes from Fremantle. All services are operated by Transdev WA.
