= Corpus Christi College, Perth =

Private co-educational day school in Bateman, Western Australia

Corpus Christi College

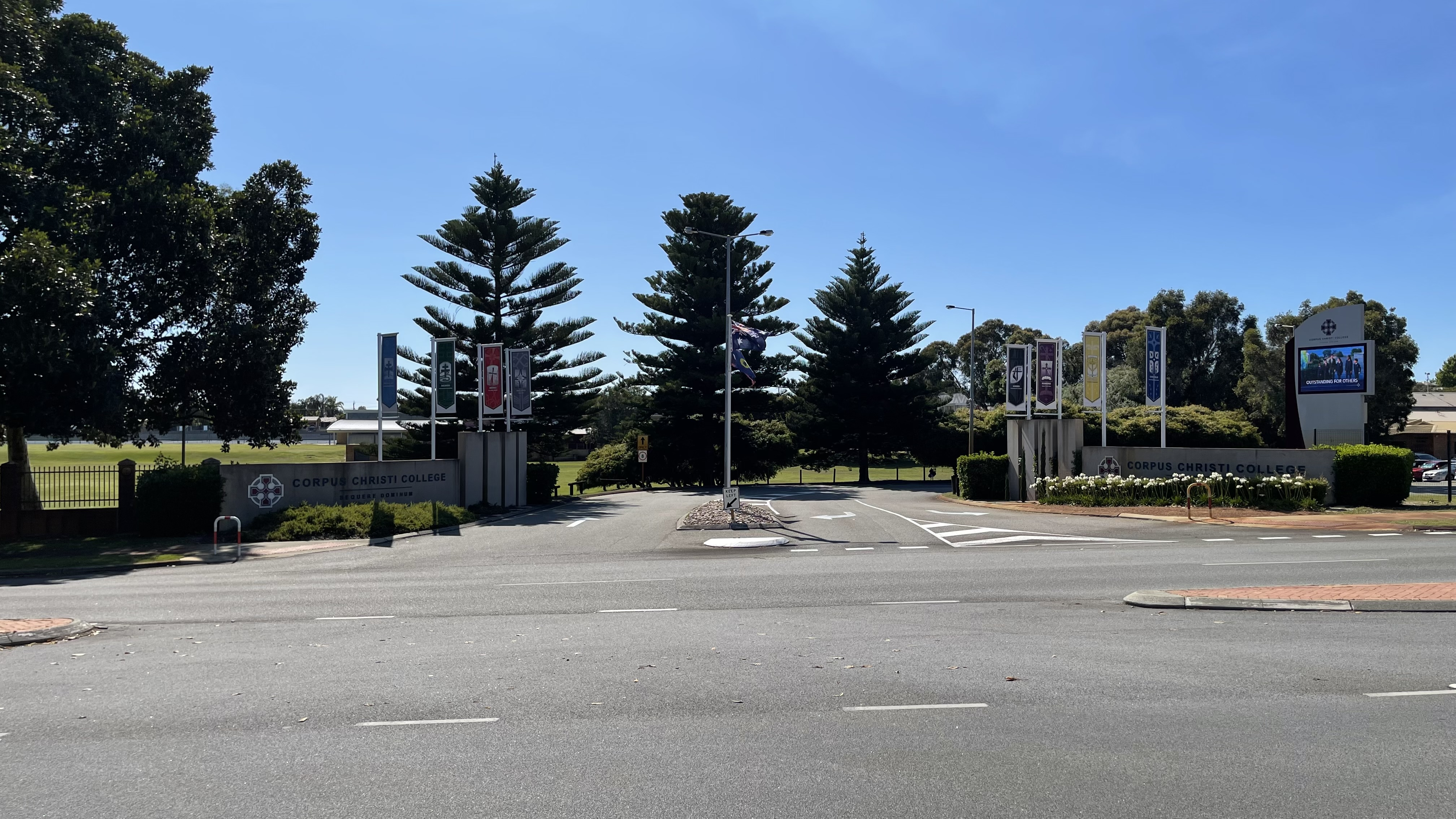

Location
- 50 Murdoch Drive; Bateman, Western Australia, 6150; Australia; 32°3′23″S 115°50′34″E

Information
- Type: Private, co-educational, day school
- Motto: Latin: Sequere Dominium (Follow The Lord)
- Denomination: Catholic
- Established: 1983
- Principal: Jeff Allen
- Enrolment: ~1755 (K–12) (2022)
- Colours: Burgundy, white and blue
- Website: www.corpus.wa.edu.au

Corpus Christi College is a private, co-educational, Catholic College located in Bateman, a southern suburb of Perth, Western Australia.

Established in 1983, the College has a non-selective enrolment policy and currently caters for approximately 1,755 students from Kindergarten to Year 12. The majority of students attending the college are drawn from the local parishes of Bateman, Willetton, Applecross, Winthrop, Riverton and Canning Vale.

== History ==
Corpus Christi College was officially opened as a co-educational Catholic College for secondary students by the Archbishop of Perth, Lancelot John Goody, and the Commonwealth Minister for Finance, John Dawkins, on 17 April 1983. It was established as the first non-order owned co-educational Catholic Secondary College in the Archdiocese of Perth by the Catholic Education Commission. From its opening, it had 128 Year 8 students and 7 teaching staff. The number has since grown to 1755 students from Kindergarten to Year 12, following the amalgamation with Yidarra Catholic Primary School on 1 January 2022.

The school has produced one Rhodes scholar: Travers McLeod (2007), and one New Colombo Plan Scholar: Wai Sin Wan (2021).

In 1983, construction of the foundation block was completed, consisting of a temporary canteen (now the college chapel), classrooms, change-rooms and a temporary library. In 1985–1986, this was extended with the completion of the lower facing classrooms of Mayne Block and The Robert McCormack Library as well as a larger administration building. A new canteen was built facing the college courtyards in 1987. This was followed by extensions to the library in 1988. In 1990, the performing arts complex was completed consisting of an auditorium and two music classrooms. Construction of an adjacent gymnasium was completed by 1997. In 2004, a new centre for Year 8 students was built and design technology classrooms were refurbished.

In 2006, much needed extensions to the administration and staff room were completed. In 2009, the college welcomed its first year 7 cohort with the new Sadler Centre, originally consisting of six classrooms but later expanded to eight. By 2014, the old canteen was replaced by the new cafeteria which branches out into the school courtyards and includes a dedicated space for musical performances and concerts. This also brought new offices and areas for both the college's Ministry and English departments. In 2016, a new gymnasium was constructed consisting of 12 classrooms, a fitness centre, new change rooms and an amphitheatre. This allowed refurbishments in 2017 to be completed, transforming the former gymnasium into a performing arts centre. In 2019, this was expanded with the construction of a theatre seating 400 attendees. In 2021, construction for the Jennifer Reilly Aquatic Centre was completed allowing for its use in physical education classes, swimming carnivals, extra-curricular swim clubs and a learn-to-swim program.

In 2022, Corpus Christi College amalgamated with Yidarra Catholic Primary School. This allowed for the college to become a K-12 school allowing for students to commence education in kindergarten instead of Year 7. Additionally, students enrolled at Yiddara Catholic Primary School will automatically be accepted into Corpus Christi College.

== Campus ==
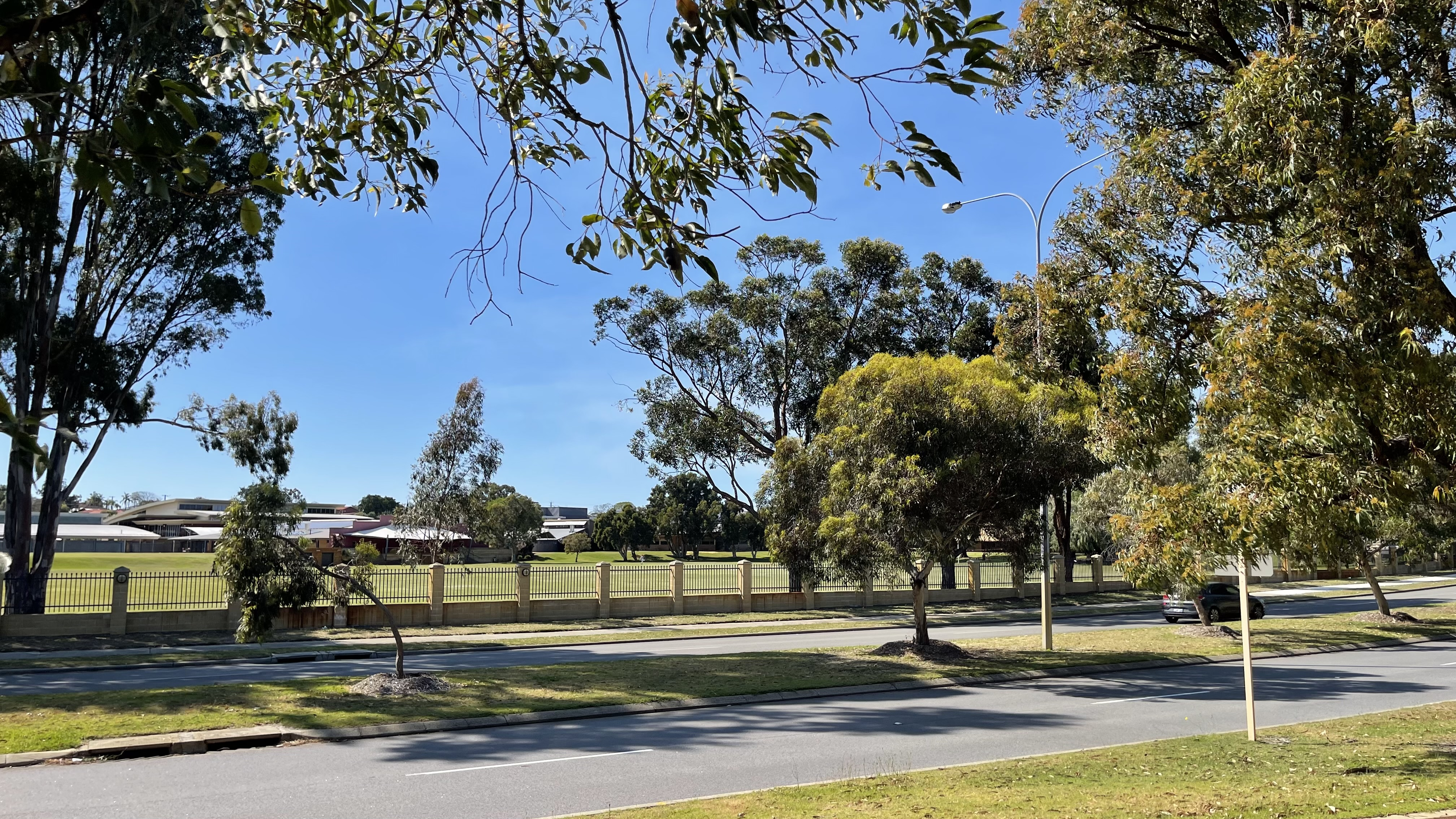
View of northwestern side of campus across Murdoch Drive

Corpus Christi College is situated on a single, 7-hectare (17-acre) campus, located in suburban Bateman.

The current facilities of the college include: a theatre; Education Support Centre; chapel; library; science laboratories; an auditorium with associated music and drama facilities; computer laboratories; specialist rooms for art, craft, food technology, fabrics and textiles, materials technology, technical graphics and information communication technology; a gymnasium; oval; playing fields; year 7 block; multipurpose hall; hard courts; and an aquatics centre.

Officially opened in August 2019, the Caroline Payne Theatre caters to the needs of drama, dance and music disciplines, while also being suitable for assemblies and presentations.

The college completed construction for the Jennifer Reilly Aquatic Centre in 2021. The aquatic centre includes a heated 25-metre (82 ft), eight-lane indoor lap and water polo pool, a separate 12-metre (39 ft) learn-to-swim pool and terrace seating for 180 people. The aquatic centre was named after the college's alumni student, Jennifer Reilly, an Olympian swimmer who has competed internationally.

The college consists of many positions aimed at developing an inclusive and supportive Christian community including House coordinators, psychologists, deputy principals and Christian Service leaders.

== House system ==
As with most Australian schools, Corpus utilises a house system. Students are placed in a house in Year 7 or when joining the college, these houses determine their homeroom for Years 7-12 and their involvement in many pastoral and athletic based activities and events. As of 2011, there are eight houses: non-selective enrolment policy and currently caters for approximately 1,755 students from Kindergarten to Year 12. The majority of students attending the college are drawn from the local parishes of Bateman, Willetton, Applecross, Winthrop, Riverton and Canning Vale.

== History ==
Corpus Christi College was officially opened as a co-educational Catholic College for secondary students by the Archbishop of Perth, Sir Lancelot Goody, and the Commonwealth Minister for Finance, John Dawkins, on 17 April 1983. It was established as the first non-order owned co-educational Catholic Secondary College in the Archdiocese of Perth by the Catholic Education Commission. From its opening it had 128 Year 8 students and 7 teaching staff which has since grown into its present numbers of 1755 students from Kindergarten to Year 12, after amalgamating with Yidarra Catholic Primary School on 1 January 2022.

The school has produced one Rhodes scholar: Travers McLeod (2007), and one New Colombo Plan Scholar: Wai Sin Wan (2021).

In 1983, construction of foundation block was completed, consisting of a temporary canteen (now the college chapel), classrooms, change-rooms and a temporary library. In 1985–86, this was extended with the completion of the lower facing classrooms of Mayne Block and The Robert McCormack Library as well as a larger administration building. In 1987, a new canteen was built facing the college courtyards. This was followed by extensions to the library in 1988. In 1990, the performing arts complex was completed, consisting of an auditorium and two music classrooms. The construction of an adjacent gymnasium was completed by 1997. In 2004, a new centre for Year 8 students was built and design technology classrooms were refurbished.

In 2006, much needed extensions to the administration and staff room were completed. In 2009, the college welcomed its first Year 7 cohort with the new Sadler Centre, originally consisting of six classrooms but later expanded to eight. By 2014, the old canteen was replaced by the new cafeteria which branches out into the school courtyards and includes a dedicated space for musical performances and concerts. This also brought new offices and areas for both the college's Ministry and English departments. In 2016, a new gymnasium was constructed consisting of 12 classrooms, a fitness centre, new change rooms and an amphitheatre. This allowed refurbishments in 2017 to be completed transforming the former gymnasium into a performing arts centre. In 2019, this was expanded into the construction of a theatre seating 400 attendees. In 2021, construction for the Jennifer Reilly Aquatic Centre was completed allowing for its use in physical education classes, swimming carnivals, extra-curricular swim clubs and a learn-to-swim program.

In 2022, Corpus Christi College amalgamated with Yidarra Catholic Primary School. This allowed the college to become a K-12 institution, enabling students to commence their education in kindergarten instead of Year 7. Additionally, students enrolled at Yiddara Catholic Primary School are automatically accepted into Corpus Christi College.

== Campus ==
Corpus Christi College is situated on a single, seven hectare campus, located in suburban Bateman.

The current facilities of the college include: a Theatre; Education Support Centre; chapel; library; science laboratories; an auditorium with associated music and drama facilities; computer laboratories; specialist rooms for art, craft, food technology, fabrics and textiles, materials technology, technical graphics and information communication technology; a gymnasium; oval; playing fields; year 7 block; multipurpose hall; hard courts; an aquatics centre.

Officially opened in August 2019, the Caroline Payne Theatre caters to the needs of drama, dance and music disciplines, while also being suitable for assemblies and presentations.

The college completed construction for the Jennifer Reilly Aquatic Centre in 2021. The aquatic centre includes a heated 25 metre, eight-lane indoor lap and water polo pool, a separate 12 metre learn-to-swim pool and terrace seating for 180 people. The aquatic centre was named after the college's alumni student, Jennifer Reilly, an Olympian swimmer who has competed internationally.

The college consists of many positions aimed at developing an inclusive and supportive Christian community including House coordinators, psychologists, deputy principals and Christian Service leaders.

== House system ==
As with most Australian schools, Corpus utilises a house system. Students are placed in a house in Year 7 or when joining the college, these houses determine their homeroom for Years 7-12 and their involvement in many pastoral and athletic based activities and events. As of 2011, there are eight houses:

House	Colour	Named for
Chisholm House	Royal blue	Caroline Chisholm
de Vialar House	Gold	Emily de Vialar
MacKillop House	Light blue	Mary MacKillop
Merici House	Red	Angela Merici
Pallotti House	Silver	Vincent Pallotti
Romero House	Purple	Óscar Romero
Salvado House	Emerald green	Rosendo Salvado
Xavier House	Black	Francis Xavier

== Notable alumni ==
- Emma Biss – Western Fury and Perth Scorchers cricketer
- Simon Black – Brisbane Lions Football Club player, 2002 Brownlow Medalist
- Josh Carr – Port Adelaide Football Club player
- Matthew Carr – retired footballer, brother of Josh
- John Carey – politician
- Karina Carvalho – Australian journalist
- Charmaine Dragun – co-anchor for Channel 10 news team 2003–2007
- Garrick Ibbotson – Fremantle Football Club player
- Andrija Jukic – Perth Glory Football Club player
- Minjee Lee – professional and Olympic golfer (also attended Methodist Ladies' College, Perth)
- Chris Masten – West Coast Eagles player
- Shaun McManus – retired Fremantle Football Club player and radio breakfast show host on Nova 93.7 from Monday to Friday
- Ross O'Donovan – animator, voice actor, and co-host of Steam Train
- Chris Piechocki – actor, Reef Doctors, Ms Fisher's Murder Mysteries
- Jennifer Reilly – Olympic swimmer
- Rove McManus – host of Rove Live, owner of production company Roving Enterprises, multi Gold Logie Award winner
- Jaeger O'Meara – Fremantle Dockers player
- Steve Erceg – UFC Flyweight

== See also ==
- Education in Australia
- List of schools in the Perth metropolitan area
- Public and private education in Australia
- Roman Catholic Church in Australia
