= Melville, Western Australia =

Melville
- Suburb
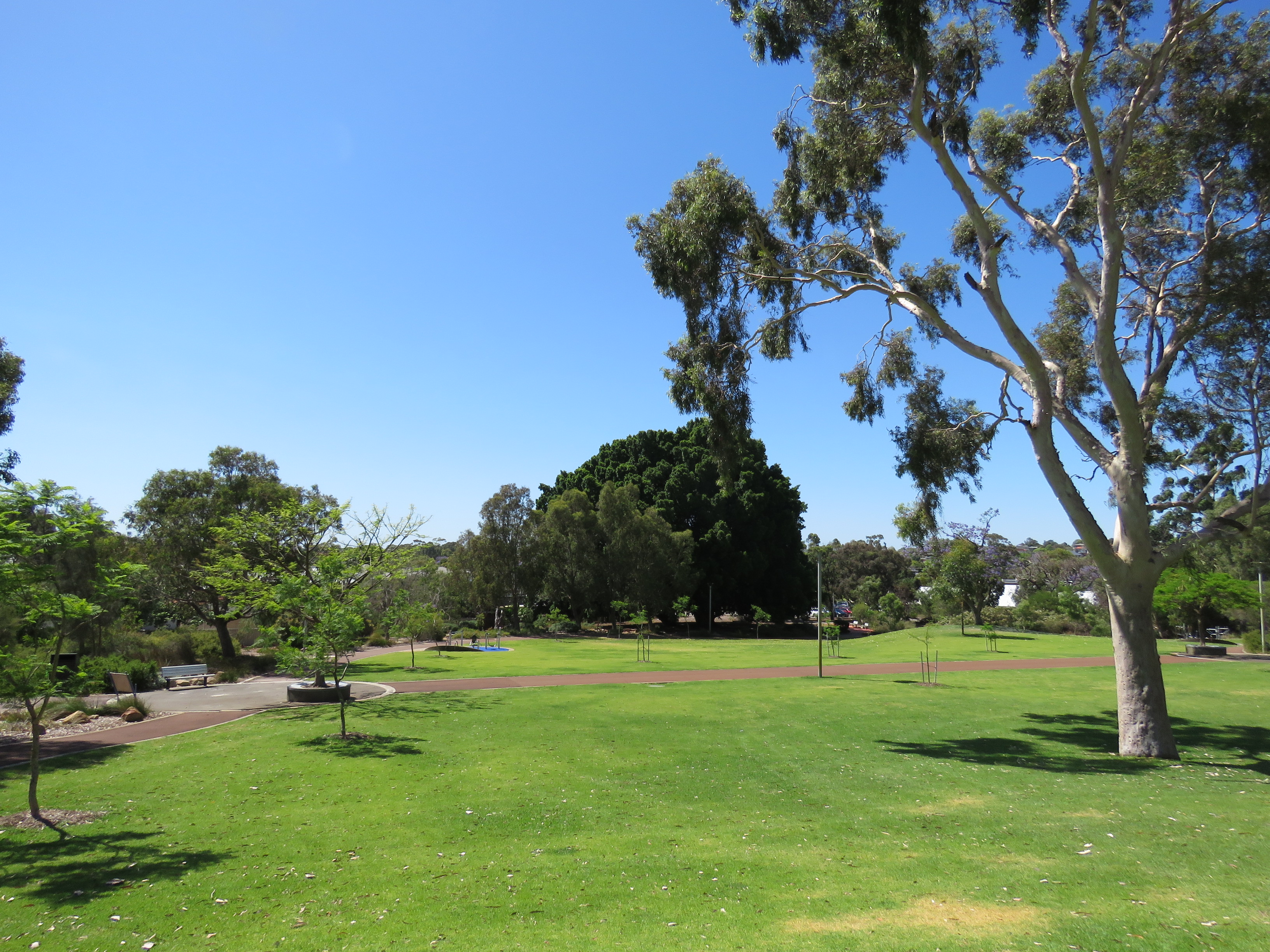
- Kadidjiny Park, Melville
- Interactive map of Melville
- Coordinates: 32°02′26″S 115°48′05″E
- Country: Australia
- State: Western Australia
- City: Perth
- LGA: City of Melville

Government
  - State electorate: Bicton
  - Federal division: Tangney

Area
  - Total: 2.4 km^{2} (0.93 sq mi)

Population
  - Total: 6,204 (SAL 2021)
- Postcode: 6156
Suburbs around Melville
Bicton	Attadale	Alfred Cove
Palmyra	Melville	Myaree
O'Connor	Willagee	Willagee

Melville is a suburb of Perth, Western Australia located within the likewise named City of Melville.

== History ==
Melville is named after the nearby Melville Water, a section of the Swan River. Melville Water was named after Robert Dundas, 2nd Viscount Melville, by Governor James Stirling. The name was first used in the area for the Melville Park Estate in 1896.

== Transport ==
=== Bus ===
- 111 Fremantle Station to WACA Ground – serves Canning Highway
- 114 Lake Coogee to Elizabeth Quay Bus Station – serves Marmion Street
- 502 Fremantle Station to Bull Creek Station – serves Leach Highway
- 910 Fremantle Station to Perth Busport (high frequency) – serves Canning Highway
- 915 Fremantle Station to Bull Creek Station (high frequency) – serves Marmion Street
