= Winthrop, Western Australia =

Winthrop
- Suburb
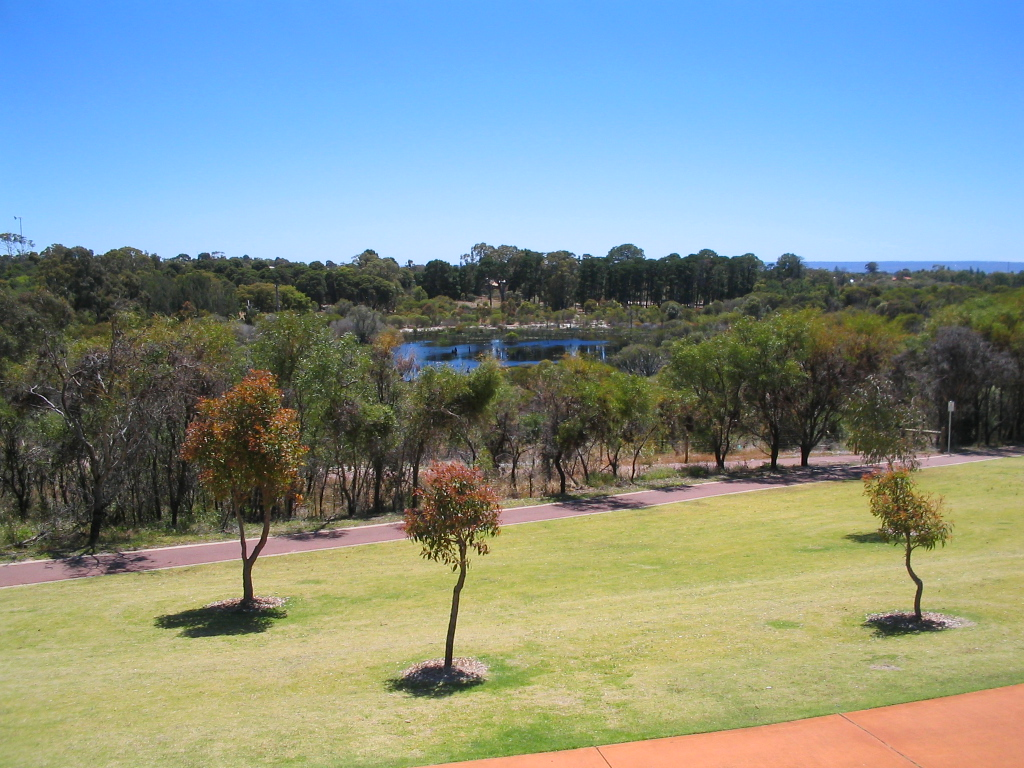
- Piney Lakes Reserve
- Interactive map of Winthrop
- Coordinates: 32°03′08″S 115°49′47″E
- Country: Australia
- State: Western Australia
- City: Perth
- LGA: City of Melville
- Established: 1976

Government
  - State electorate: Bateman
  - Federal division: Tangney

Population
  - Total: 6,020 (SAL 2021)
- Postcode: 6150
Suburbs around Winthrop
Myaree	Booragoon	Brentwood
Willagee	Winthrop	Bateman
Kardinya	Murdoch	Bateman

Winthrop is a southern suburb of Perth, Western Australia, located within the City of Melville.

== History ==
Winthrop was originally a pine tree plantation owned by the University of Western Australia.

The first blocks were sold in the early 1980s. After the first residents moved in, more blocks were sold off in a number of phases. Shortly after the first residents, a convenience store opened for business, which now includes a post office, IGA store and a florist. Soon the Winthrop Primary school and Winthrop village shopping centre were opened. Blocks were so sought after that many people resorted to sleeping near the sales office for up to a week just to secure a position.

The name is derived from that of the first Chancellor of the University of Western Australia, John Winthrop Hackett. There are very few reminders of Winthrop's past as a pine plantation with scattered remnants of pine trees being the only indication. As the pines were gradually removed, development occurred from the late 1970s to mid 1980s.

== Transport ==
=== Road ===
Winthrop is bordered by three major roads: Leach Highway to the north, Murdoch Drive to the east, North Lake Road to the west and Somerville Boulevard to the south, which connects North Lake Road to Murdoch Drive.

The main local neighbourhood distributors are: Winthrop Drive, dividing the east and west of Winthrop, and Jackson Avenue, which passes both Winthrop Primary School and the Winthrop Village Shopping Centre. Other minor tier roads include Hatherley Parade, Aitken Drive and Ten Seldam Circle.

=== Bus ===
- 115 Elizabeth Quay Bus Station to Hamilton Hill Memorial Hall – serves Leach Highway, Winthrop Drive, Jackson Avenue and Somerville Boulevard
- 160 WACA Ground to Fremantle Station – serves North Lake Road
- 502 Bull Creek Station to Fremantle Station – serves Leach Highway
- 503 Bull Creek Station to Murdoch Station – serves Leach Highway, Winthrop Drive and Somerville Boulevard
- 504 Bull Creek Station to Murdoch Station – serves Leach Highway, Winthrop Drive, Jackson Avenue and Somerville Boulevard
- 505 Bull Creek Station to Murdoch Station – serves Murdoch Drive
- 510 Murdoch Station to Booragoon Bus Station – serves Murdoch Drive and Leach Highway
- 511 Murdoch Station to Fremantle Station – serves Somerville Boulevard
- 915 Bull Creek Station to Fremantle Station (high frequency) – serves Leach Highway

=== Train ===
The closest train stations are Bull Creek and Murdoch, both situated 1.2 kilometres (0.75 mi) east of Winthrop. Fremantle Train Station is located approximately 9 kilometres (5.6 mi) to the west.

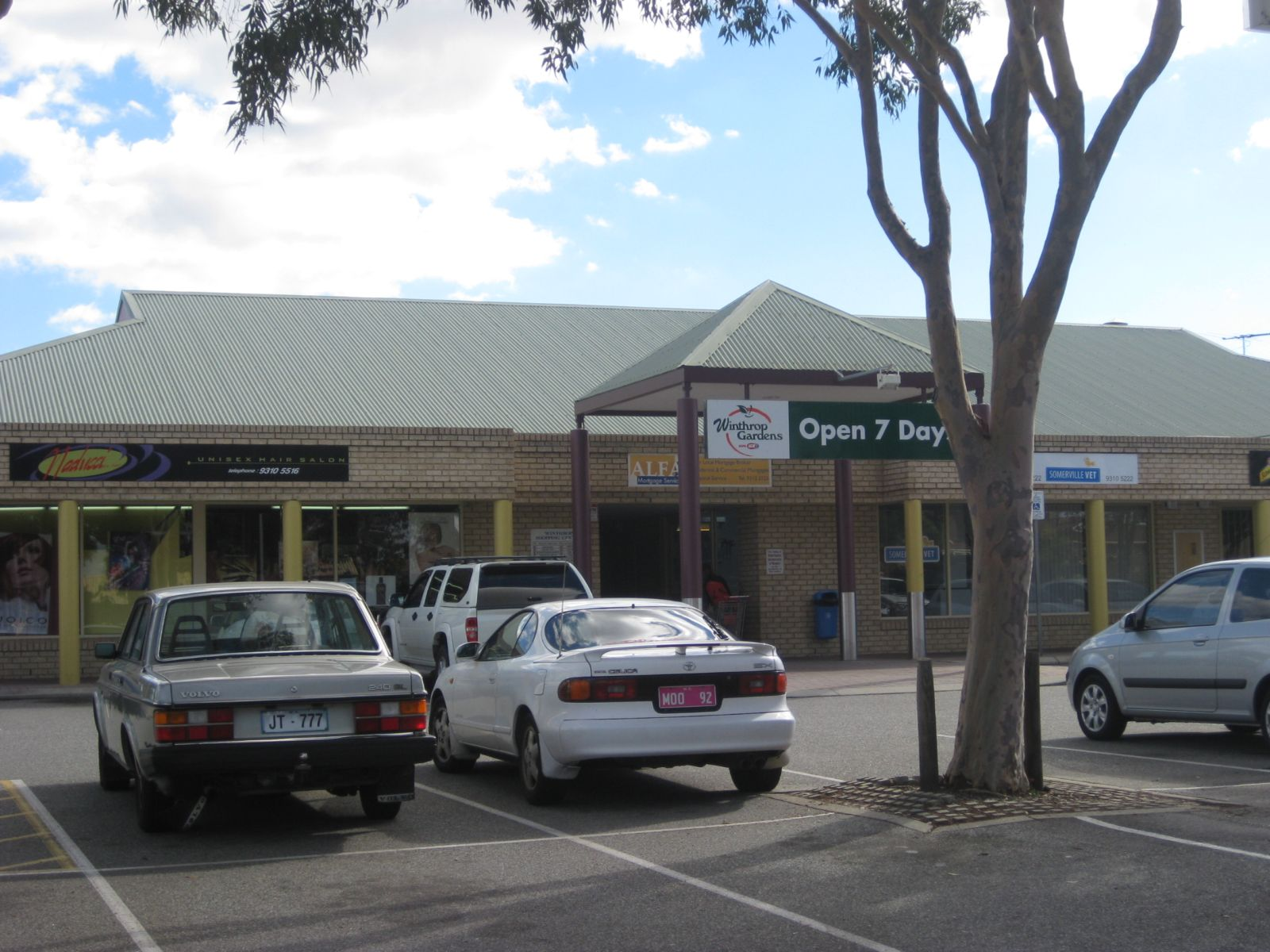
Winthrop Village Shopping Centre

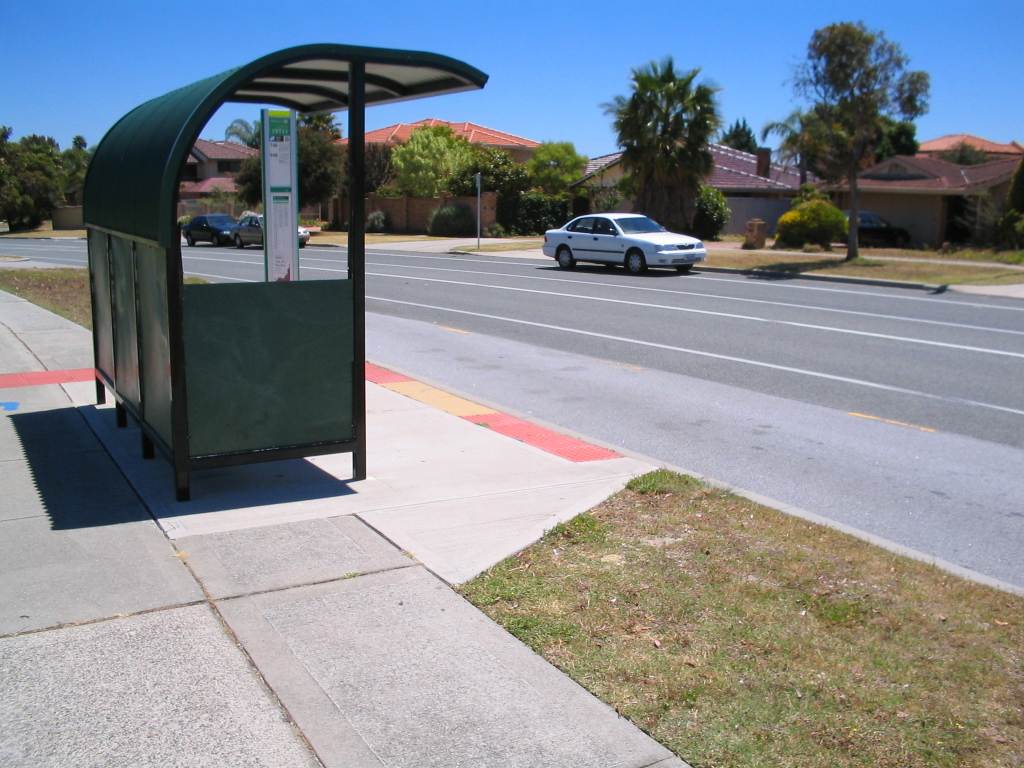
A covered bus stop in Winthrop. This is located outside of Winthrop primary school. It is a timed stop for the 115 and 504 routes.

== Education ==
The primary schools in and around Winthrop are Winthrop Primary School, Booragoon Primary School, Caralee Community School, Kardinya Primary School and Yidarra Primary School. Nearby secondary schools include Applecross Senior High School, Corpus Christi College, Melville Senior High School, Murdoch College, and Kennedy Baptist College which was formed by a merger of Winthrop Baptist College and Somerville Baptist College in 2013. Nearby tertiary institutions include Murdoch University, Murdoch Institute of Technology, and Challenger Tafe.

== Nature ==
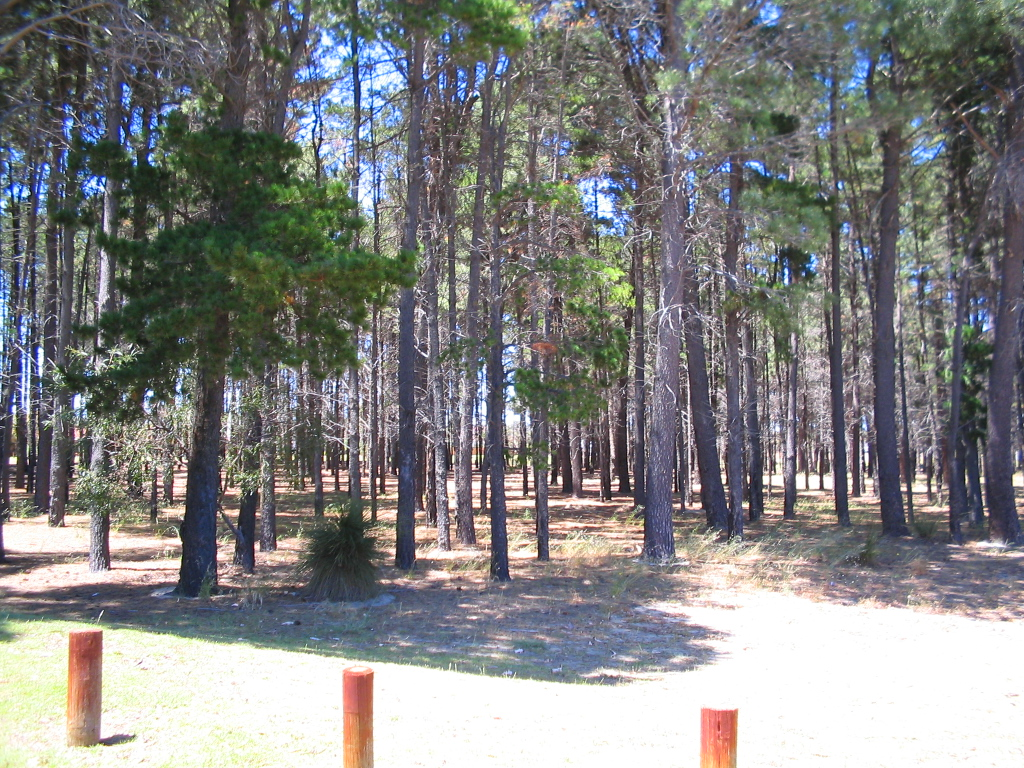
Largest block of original pine trees

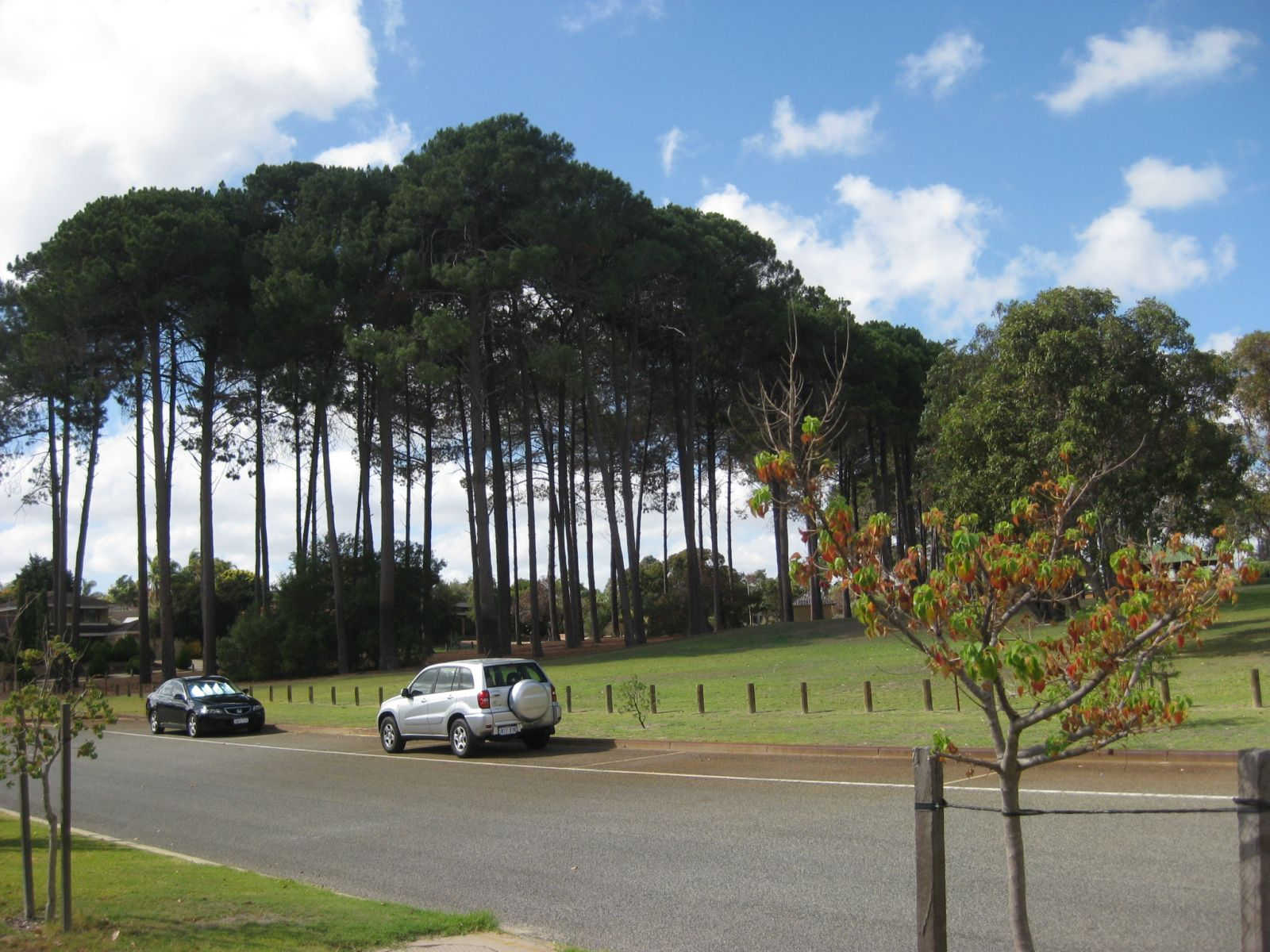
Hill Park in Winthrop, pictured looking east-southeast

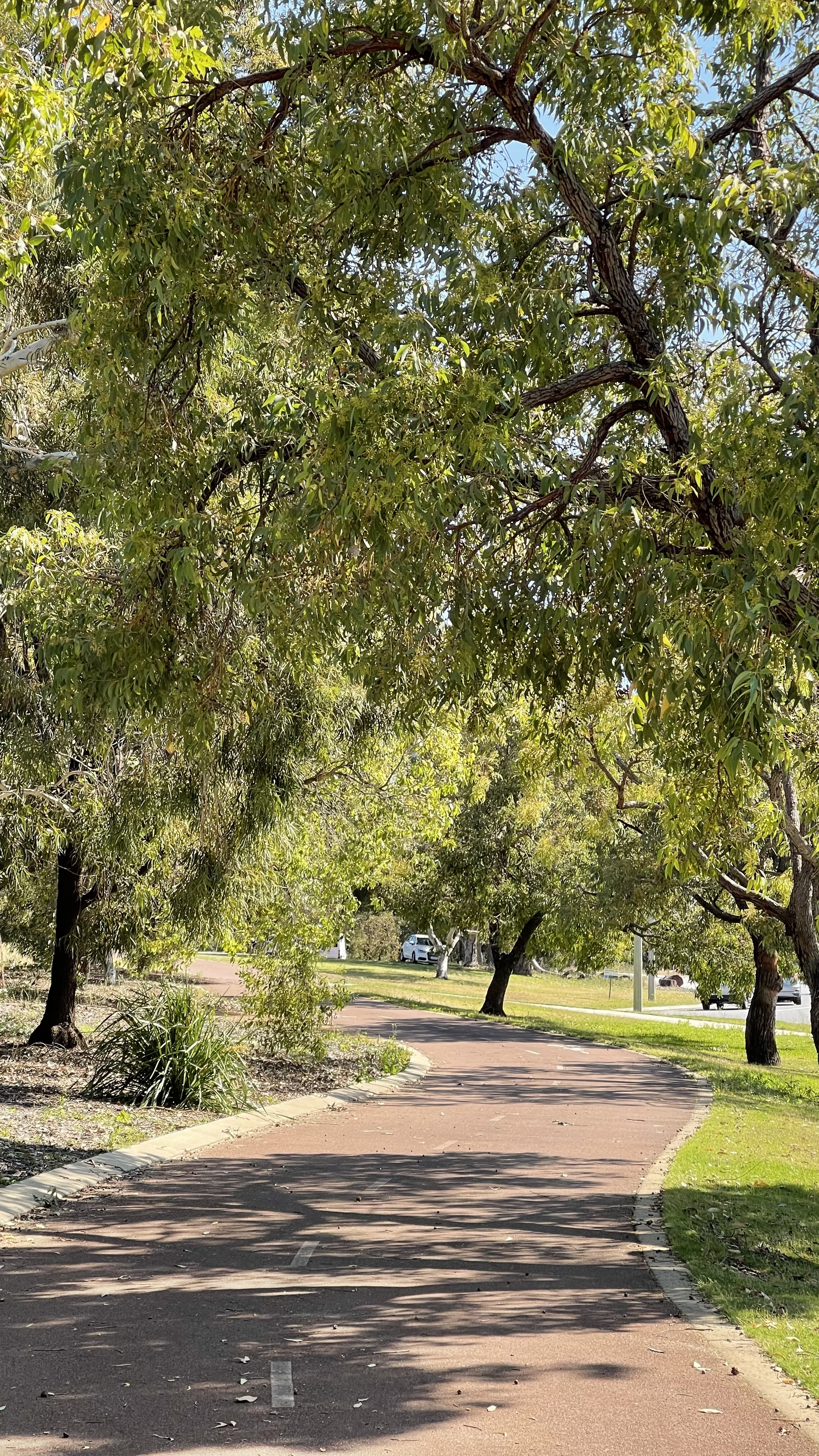
Murdoch Drive shared path

Winthrop has many parks, with the central area of the suburb containing Winthrop Park that is bordered by pine trees.

There are few areas left of the original pine plantation, the largest of which is located near Winthrop Park.

Situated in the north-east of Winthrop is the Piney Lakes Reserve. There are a number of trails through it and a guided footpath. The Piney Lakes conservation centre hosts school visits, and aims to maintain the natural ecosystem in the area.

The Piney Lakes Nature Reserve is home to a number of native birds including willie wagtails, warblers and cockatoos. Southern brown bandicoots also inhabit the area.

A natural wetlands houses many native flora and fauna and is open to the public.
