= Brentwood, Western Australia =

Suburb of Perth, Western Australia

Brentwood
- Suburb
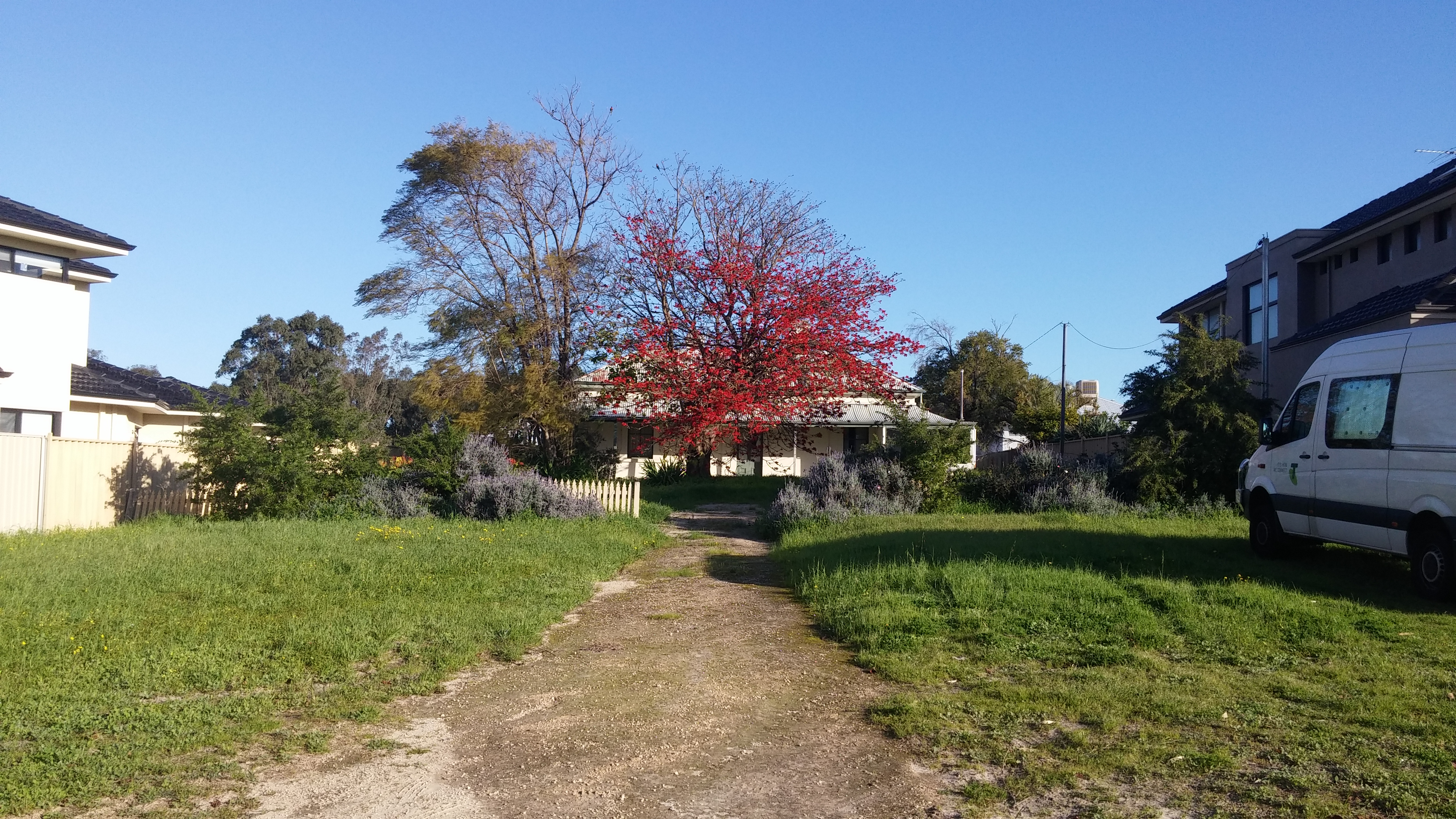
- The historical Grasmere homestead on Spinaway Crescent that dates to the late nineteenth century.
- Interactive map of Brentwood
- Coordinates: 32°02′37″S 115°51′09″E
- Country: Australia
- State: Western Australia
- City: Perth
- LGA: City of Melville
- Established: 1950s

Government
  - State electorate: Bateman
  - Federal division: Tangney

Area
  - Total: 1 km^{2} (0.39 sq mi)

Population
  - Total: 2,153 (SAL 2021)
- Postcode: 6153
Suburbs around Brentwood
Ardross	Mount Pleasant	Swan River
Booragoon	Brentwood	Rossmoyne
Winthrop	Bateman	Bull Creek

Brentwood is a suburb of Perth, Western Australia, located within the City of Melville and approximately 10 kilometres (6.2 mi) from the Perth CBD. The nearest airport is Perth Airport (16 kilometres or 9.9 miles away) and the nearest railway station is Bull Creek (800 metres (2,600 ft) away).

== History ==
Brentwood was developed as a state housing suburb after World War II. It is named after Brentwood, an English town near London which was the birthplace of John Bateman, a pioneer settler in the area.

== Transport ==
=== Bus ===
- 500 Bull Creek Station to Booragoon Bus Station – serves Moolyeen Road, Adamson Road and Bateman Road

Bus routes serving Leach Highway:

- 178 Bull Creek Station to Elizabeth Quay Bus Station
- 179 Bull Creek Station to Elizabeth Quay Bus Station
- 502 Bull Creek Station to Fremantle Station
- 503 Bull Creek Station to Murdoch Station
- 504 Bull Creek Station to Murdoch Station
- 505 Bull Creek Station to Murdoch Station
- 508 Bull Creek Station to Cannington Station
- 509 Bull Creek Station to Cannington Station
- 915 Bull Creek Station to Fremantle Station (high frequency)
