= Lisa O'Malley =

Australian politician (born 1968)

Lisa O'Malley MLA

Member of the Western Australian Legislative Assembly for Bicton
- Incumbent
- Assumed office 11 March 2017
- Preceded by: new seat

Personal details
- Born: 25 September 1968 (age 57) Korumburra, Victoria, Australia
- Party: Labor
- Website: www.lisaomalley.com.au

Lisa Margaret O'Malley (born 25 September 1968) is an Australian politician. She has been a Labor member of the Western Australian Legislative Assembly since the 2017 state election, representing Bicton.

O'Malley was born in Victoria and moved to Western Australia in 1993. She worked as a personal trainer and group fitness leader, and managed two gymnasiums from 1993 to 2000. She was elected to Melville City Council in 2015.

O'Malley was re-elected in the 2025 Western Australian state election.

Western Australian Legislative Assembly
New seat	Member for Bicton; 2017–present	Incumbent
