= Palmyra, Western Australia =

Palmyra Perth, Western Australia
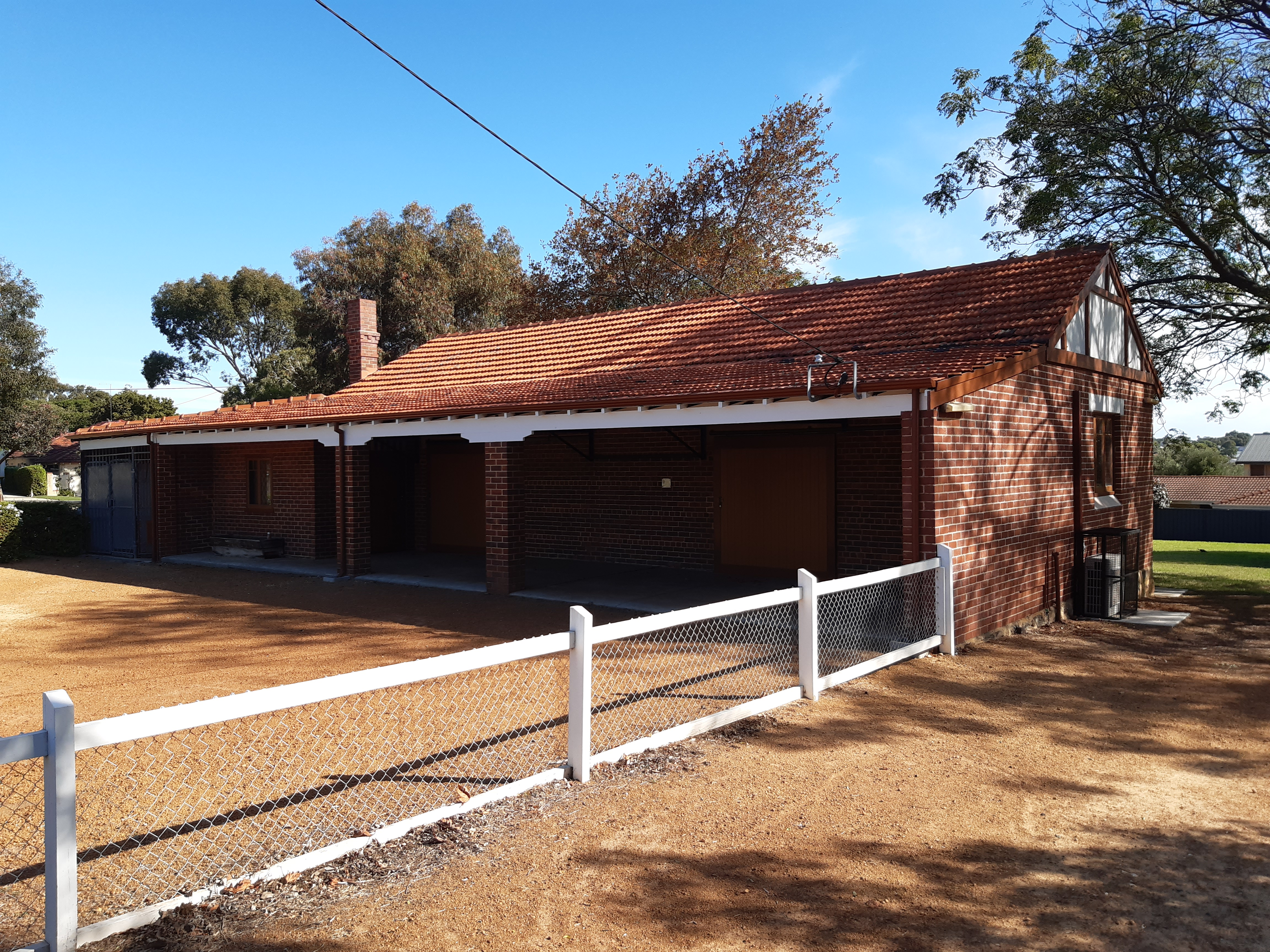
- The historic Millers' Bakehouse Museum, Palmyra
- Coordinates: 32°02′42″S 115°47′09″E
- Population: 7,585 (SAL 2021)
- Postcode(s): 6157
- Area: 3.1 km^{2} (1.2 sq mi)
- Location: 16 km (10 mi) from Perth
- LGA(s): City of Melville
- State electorate(s): Bicton / Fremantle
- Federal division(s): Fremantle
Suburbs around Palmyra:
East Fremantle	Bicton	Attadale
East Fremantle	Palmyra	Melville
White Gum Valley	O'Connor	Willagee

Palmyra is a suburb of Perth, Western Australia, located within the City of Melville.

The suburb east of Fremantle appears to have been first established as the Palmyra Estate in 1903. The north-eastern corner of Palmyra is some 14 kilometres (8.7 mi) from the Perth G.P.O.

The W.A. State Primary School the corner of what was then McKimmie Street (now McKimmie Road) between Zenobia and Aurelian Streets, was established in 1913. Its first Centenary was celebrated enthusiastically by students, residents and past pupils on Saturday 9 November 2013. There is also a School associated with the Catholic Our Lady of Fatima Church at 8 Foss Street. The St Peter and St Mark Anglican Church is a 2 Hammad Road. The Uniting Church is at the corner of Carrington Street and the Canning Highway. The Seventh Day Adventist Church meets on Saturdays at 10 Cleopatra Street.

Palmyra includes the Fremantle Cemetery at its south-eastern suburb boundary, south of High Street/Leach Highway. Starting from its northern boundary, clockwise, Palmyra is bounded by the Canning Highway; by Stock Road on its East; by Sainsbury Road on its South; and in a dog-leg, by Carrington Street on its West, and Marmion Street on its South, and Petra Street on its West.

The Melville History Society meets at the Miller Bakehouse, corner of Elvira and Baal Streets, Palmyra.

There are a number of parks in Palmyra;

- King Victor's Green, between Hammad, Baal and Elvira Streets, where the Miller Bakehouse Museum is situated
- Emily Main Park, south of Palin Street,
- Geo Thompson Park on McKimmie Road diagonally opposite Palmyra Primary School
- Woolshed Park, bounded by McGregor Road, from Goy Close to Baal Street
- Dark Park on the corner of Carrington Street and McGregor Road
- Dinosaur Park on the corner of Carrington and Aurelian Streets
- Three Bears Park on the corner of Adrian and Tamar Streets
- Public open space on the corner of Justinian and Solomon Streets
- Reddings Reserve, interrupting the course of Baal Street between Cleopatra and Solomon Streets
- Oz Park on the corner of Aurelian and Justinian Streets
- John O'Sullivan Park on the corner of Marmion and Baal Streets
- Bill Sheehy Park between Justinian Street, McGregor Road and Leach Highway,
- Lou Stonham Park bordering Stock Road, between McGregor Road and Forrest Street and the turn off from Leach Highway.
