= Electoral district of Bicton =

State electoral district of Western Australia

Bicton Western Australia—Legislative Assembly
- Interactive map of electoral district boundaries from the 2025 state election
- State: Western Australia
- Dates current: 2017–present
- MP: Lisa O'Malley
- Party: Labor
- Namesake: Bicton
- Electors: 31,882 (2025)
- Area: 20 km^{2} (7.7 sq mi)
- Demographic: Metropolitan
- Coordinates: 31.95°S 115.96°E
Electorates around Bicton:
Cottesloe	Nedlands	Nedlands
Cottesloe	Bicton	Bateman
Fremantle	Fremantle	Bibra Lake

Bicton is an electoral district of the Legislative Assembly of Western Australia. It is located in Perth's southern suburbs, and named after the riverside suburb of Bicton.

Bicton was created by the Western Australian Electoral Commission in a 2015 redistribution, and elected its first member at the 2017 state election. It incorporates areas that previously fell into the seats of Alfred Cove, Bateman, Fremantle and Willagee.

== Geography ==
At the 2017 state election, Bicton includes the suburbs of Attadale, Bicton, and Melville in their entireties, most of East Fremantle and Palmyra, and smaller portions of Alfred Cove, Fremantle, and Myaree. It is bounded by Stirling Highway to the west, High Street and Leach Highway to the south, North Lake Road to the east and the Swan River to the north.

== Members for Bicton ==
Bicton was created as a notionally safe Liberal seat with a majority of 10 percent over Labor, and was reckoned as the successor to the safe Liberal seat of Alfred Cove. However, in 2017, a massive Labor wave swept through Perth, and Labor's Lisa O'Malley won the seat on a swing of 13 percent. She defeated Matt Taylor, who had been the Liberal member for Bateman.

At the 2021 state election, O'Malley saw her margin swell to 15.6 percent, turning Bicton into a safe Labor seat in one stroke.

Member	Party	Term
Lisa O'Malley	Labor	2017–present

== Election results ==
2025 Western Australian state election: Bicton
Party	Candidate	Votes	%	±%
Labor	Lisa O'Malley	12,438	45.1	−11.2
Liberal	Chris Dowson	9,562	34.7	+4.6
Greens	Adam Bennett	3,982	14.5	+5.3
One Nation	Tim Smith	868	3.2	+1.8
National	Bill Koul	704	2.6	+2.6
Total formal votes		27,554	96.8	−0.6
Informal votes		924	3.2	+0.6
Turnout		28,478	89.3	+2.3
Two-party-preferred result
Labor	Lisa O'Malley	16,346	59.3	−6.8
Liberal	Chris Dowson	11,200	40.7	+6.8
Labor hold		Swing	−6.8	
