= Rossmoyne, Western Australia =

Rossmoyne
- Suburb
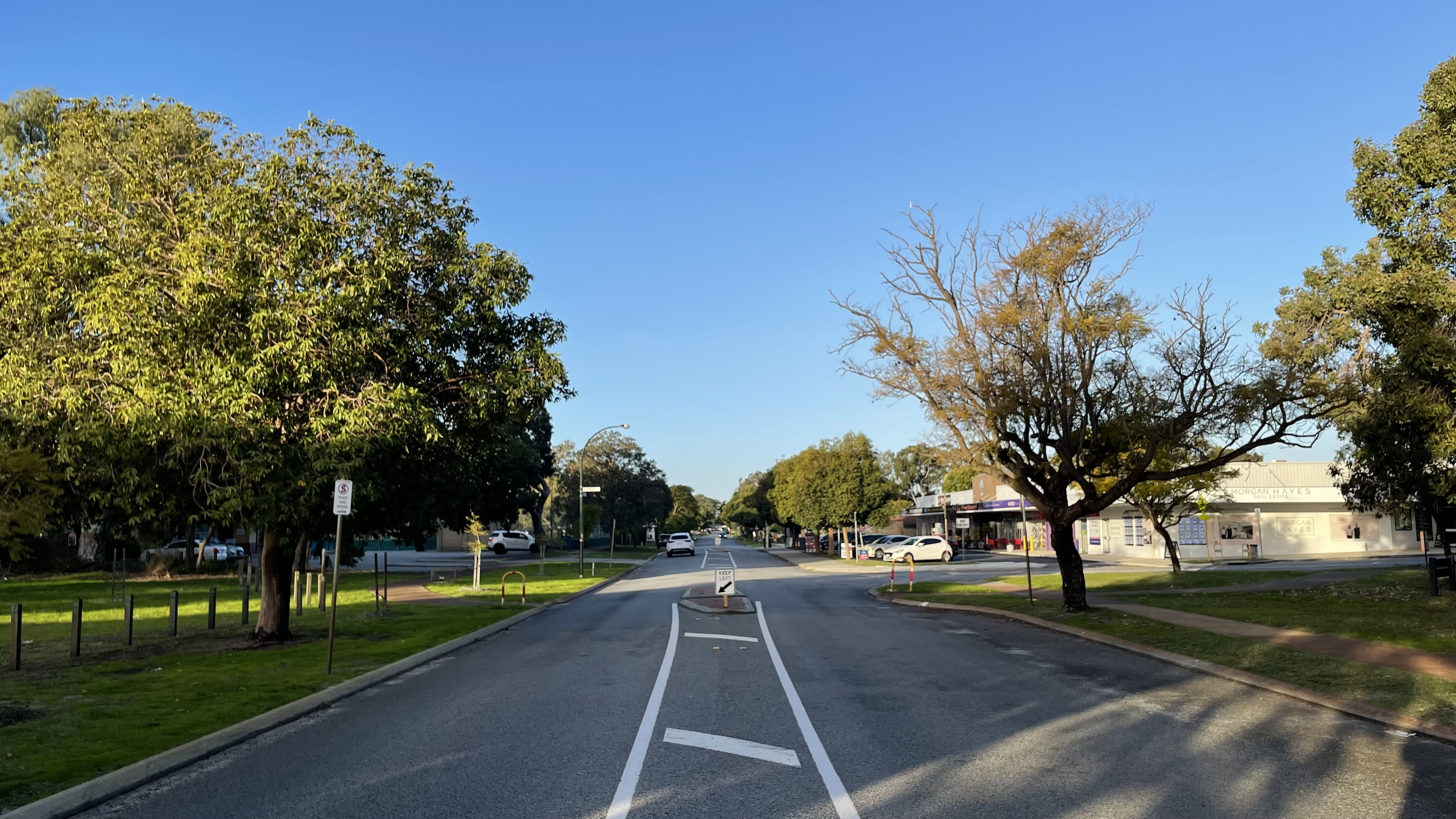
- Central Road bisects Rossmoyne into roughly equal-sized northern and southern halves
- Interactive map of Rossmoyne
- Coordinates: 32°02′23″S 115°52′05″E
- Country: Australia
- State: Western Australia
- City: Perth
- LGA: City of Canning
- Location: 14 km (8.7 mi) S of Perth

Government
  - State electorate: Riverton
  - Federal division: Tangney

Population
  - Total: 3,638 (SAL 2021)
- Postcode: 6148
Suburbs around Rossmoyne
	Canning River
Mount Pleasant	Rossmoyne	Shelley
Brentwood	Bull Creek	Willetton

Rossmoyne is a suburb of Perth, Western Australia, within the City of Canning. Rossmoyne is located 14 kilometres (8.7 mi) south of central Perth, and is bounded by Leach Highway to the south, the Bull Creek to the west, the Canning River to the north, and Shelley to the east. The area has a river front and parks.

== History ==
The name Rossmoyne was devised in 1937 after the land developer V W Webb and his family made a trip to Scotland. The name has no connection with the area but was thought to be suitable for marketing a subdivision in 1955. The use of the name as a suburb was approved in February 1960 and gazetted the following month.

The Rossmoyne Pallottine Mission was established on Fifth Avenue in 1959 as a boarding facility for Indigenous Australian students from the Kimberley and other country areas who were attending secondary schools in Perth. The residence was run by the Society of the Catholic Apostolate and operated from 1959 to 1991 catering for over 900 boarders.

Rossmoyne Primary school, located on Second Avenue, commenced operations in 1964 with an enrolment of 67 students and 3 staff, officially opening in 1965.

Construction of Rossmoyne Senior High School commenced in 1967 and was completed in 1968. The school is located on Keith Road in Bull Creek but was named after the suburb that had grown rapidly around the school site. Keith Road was named after one of Rossmoyne's first alumni, who died, having his legacy used as the name of the main road of Rossmoyne High School.

== Transportation ==
Rossmoyne is linked to Perth City by the Kwinana Freeway, and to Fremantle by Leach Highway. Transperth provides public transport services to Rossmoyne. Bus 178 runs east to Perth City via Shelley, and west to Bull Creek Station. Bus 179 runs east to Perth City via Riverton. Buses 508 and 509 run from stops on Leach Highway to Bull Creek Station and Cannington Interchange.

=== Bus ===
- 178 Bull Creek Station to Elizabeth Quay Bus Station – serves Leach Highway, Bull Creek Road, First Avenue, Wilber Street, Central Road and Fifth Avenue

Bus routes serving Leach Highway:

- 179 Bull Creek Station to Elizabeth Quay Bus Station
- 508 and 509 Bull Creek Station to Cannington Station

== Amenities ==
Rossmoyne's shopping centre, Rossmoyne Shopping Centre, includes a supermarket, eateries, a hairdresser, a post office and newsagent, a butcher, real estate agent, chemist and a pizzeria and bakery. Public tennis courts and a bowling club are located nearby.

Local students may attend Rossmoyne Community Kindergarten, Rossmoyne Primary School and Rossmoyne Senior High School.
