= O'Connor, Western Australia =

O'Connor
- Suburb
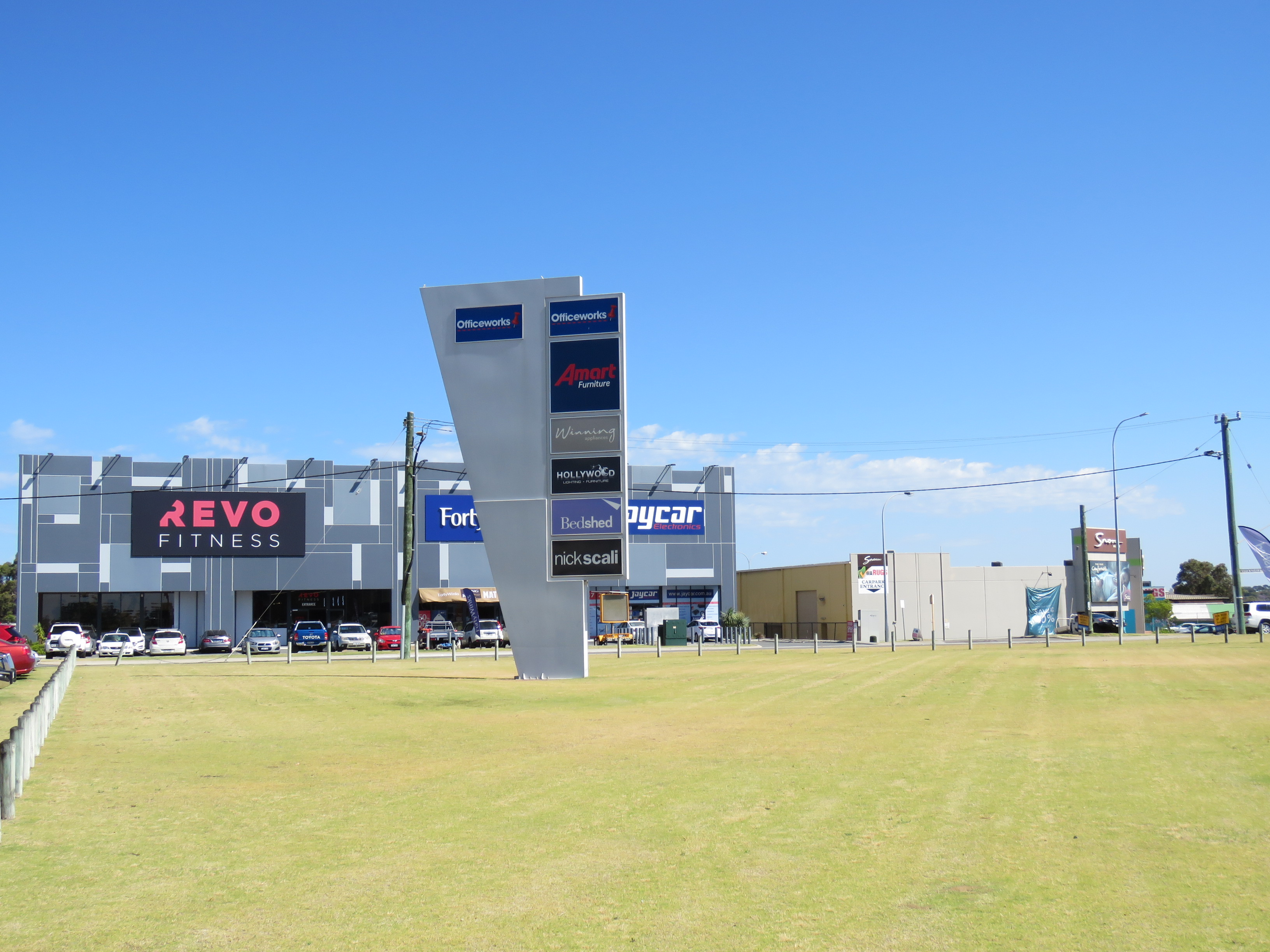
- Commercial buildings along Stock Road, O'Connor
- Interactive map of O'Connor
- Coordinates: 32°03′35″S 115°47′33″E
- Country: Australia
- State: Western Australia
- City: Perth
- LGA: City of Fremantle

Government
  - State electorate: Bicton
  - Federal division: Fremantle

Area
  - Total: 1.9 km^{2} (0.73 sq mi)

Population
  - Total: 460 (SAL 2021)
- Postcode: 6163
Suburbs around O'Connor
Fremantle	Palmyra	Willagee
White Gum Valley	O'Connor	Kardinya
Hilton	Samson	Kardinya

O'Connor is a predominantly industrial suburb of Perth, Western Australia, located within the City of Fremantle. It was established in 1955 and is named after the Irish engineer, C. Y. O'Connor, who is buried in Fremantle Cemetery.

O'Connor has a roller skating rink plus a number of retail store: a major hardware store, two major electronics retailers, a tyre store, several automotive parts and accessory stores, a popular bicycle store, a furniture store and numerous other retail stores.

There are quite a number of light industrial activities taking place in the suburb, including Anchor Foods on Carrington Street.

There are two precincts of residential dwellings which contain a small but growing number of dwellings.
