= Bateman, Western Australia =

Bateman
- Suburb
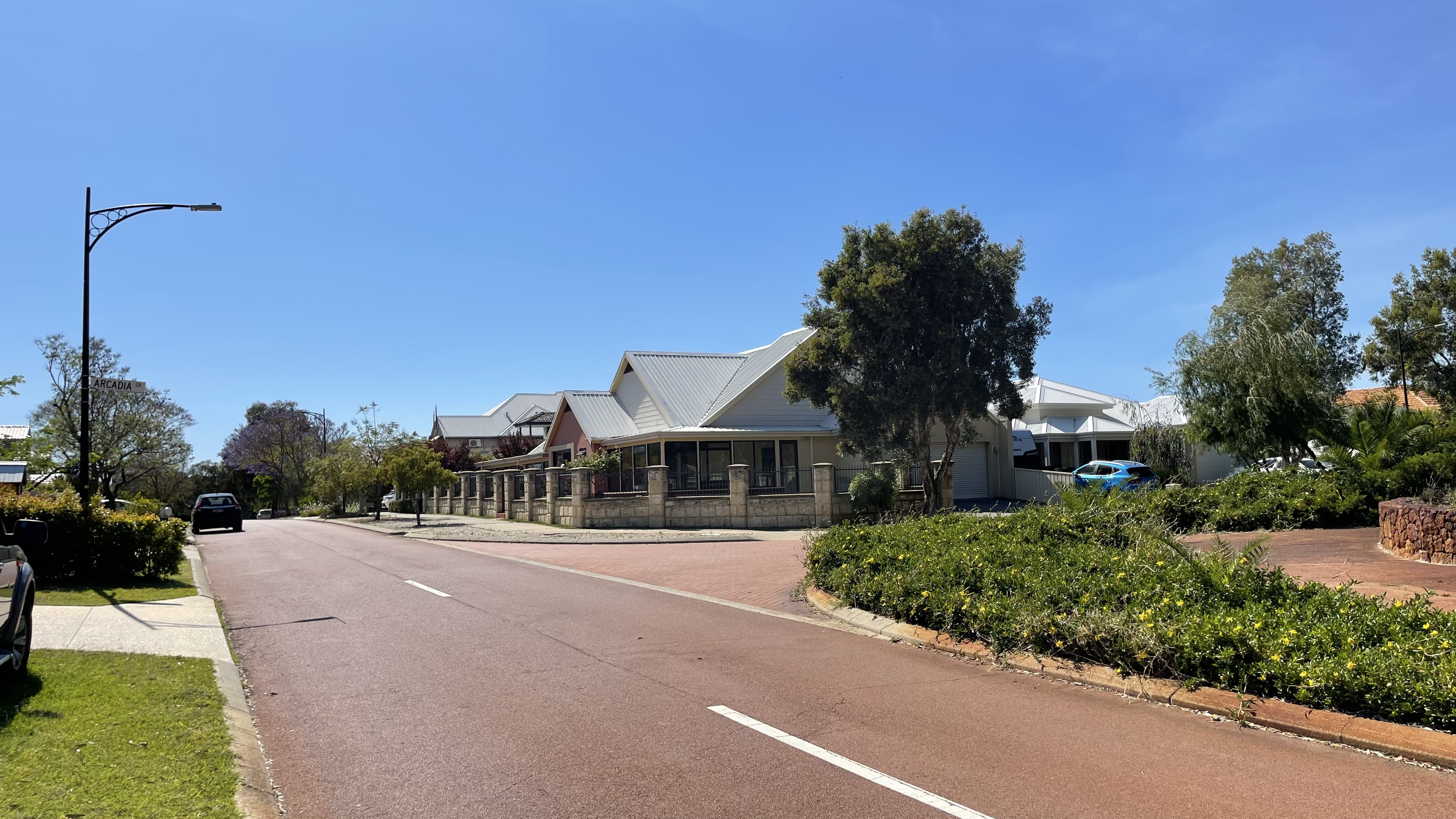
- Northeast of suburb, near monuments to Noalimba
- Interactive map of Bateman
- Coordinates: 32°03′20″S 115°50′50″E
- Country: Australia
- State: Western Australia
- City: Perth
- LGA: City of Melville
- Location: 12 km (7.5 mi) from Perth
- Established: 1960s

Government
  - State electorate: Bateman
  - Federal division: Tangney

Area
  - Total: 2.0 km^{2} (0.77 sq mi)

Population
  - Total: 3,832 (SAL 2021)
- Postcode: 6150
Suburbs around Bateman
| Booragoon | Brentwood | Rossmoyne |
| Winthrop | Bateman | Bull Creek |
| Murdoch | Murdoch | Leeming |

Bateman is a suburb of Perth, Western Australia, located within the City of Melville.

It is a mostly residential suburb with convenient road access to the Perth central business district, Fremantle, the main industrial sites, and airports. Bull Creek railway station is located at its north-eastern corner. In the 2016 census, it was recorded as having a population of 3,717 persons.

== History ==
The suburb is named after a family of prominent merchants who commenced business after arriving in the Swan River colony on board Medina in 1830. John Bateman built a general store in Fremantle and he became postmaster at Fremantle in 1833. He also took part in the establishment of a whaling business at Bathers Beach, Fremantle. After his death in 1855, his sons took over the family business.

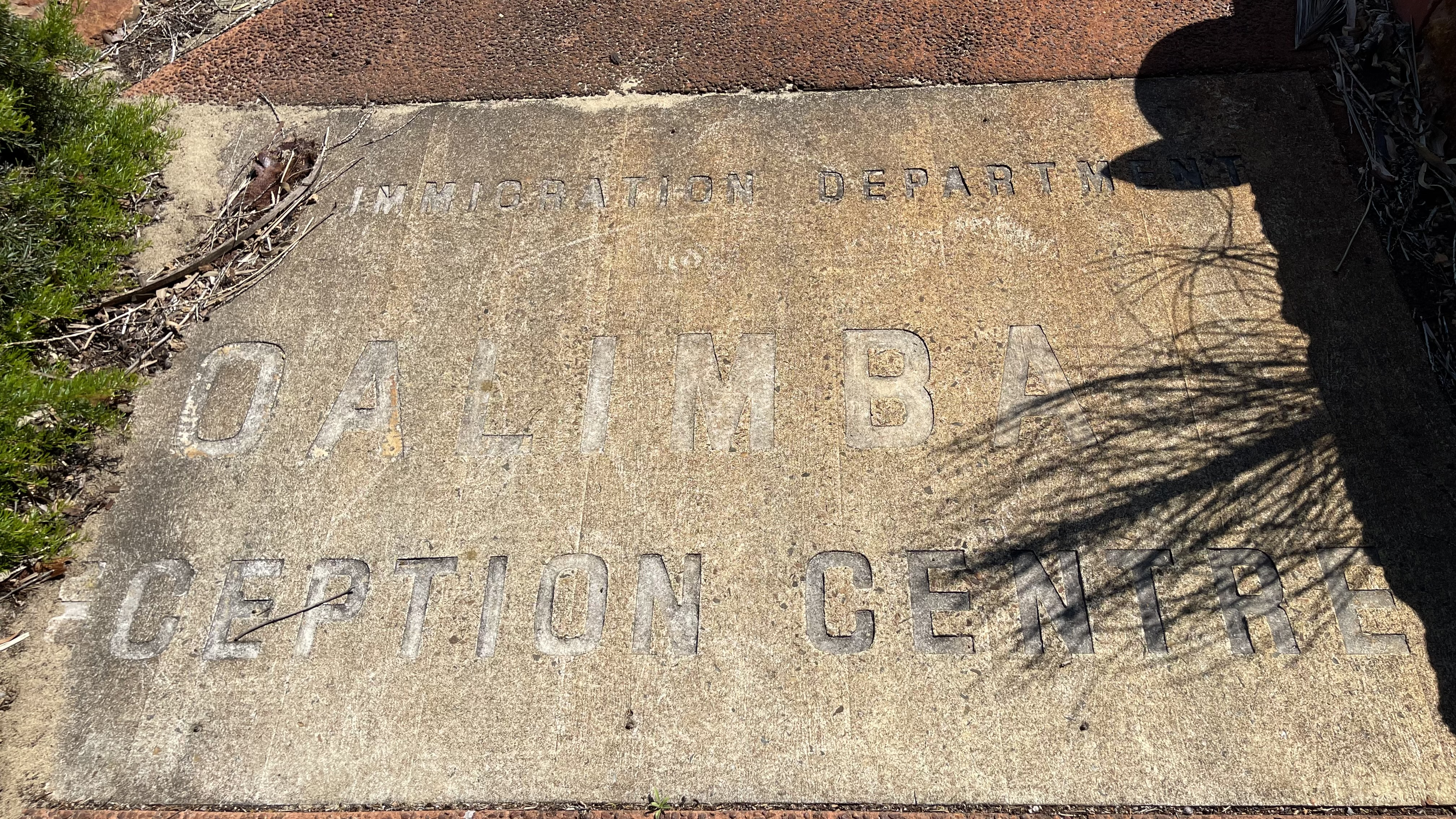
Inset in path near Noalimba and Arcadia crescents intersection

The Noalimba Reception Centre, built in 1968 at a cost of A$1.55 million, equivalent to A$21.56 in 2022, to accommodate British migrants to Western Australia, was located in the northeast of Bateman. Noalimba means 'belonging to all'. It "was demolished in 2003".

== Geography ==
The suburb is bounded by Leach Highway to the north, Kwinana Freeway to the east, South Street to the south and Murdoch Drive to the west.

== Facilities ==
Bateman is served by Bull Creek railway station (located at the intersection of Leach Highway and the Kwinana Freeway) which was officially opened on 23 December 2007, as part of the Perth to Mandurah railway.

The suburb has a small commercial centre (located on Parry Avenue) along with some medical and chiropractic facilities.

There is one primary state school, Bateman Primary School, as well as a Catholic K-12 school, Corpus Christi College.

== Transport ==
=== Bus ===
- 502 Bull Creek Station to Fremantle Station – serves Leach Highway
- 503 and 504 Bull Creek Station to Murdoch Station – serve Leach Highway and South Street
- 505 Bull Creek Station to Murdoch Station – serves Leach Highway, Murdoch Drive, Dean Road, Broadhurst Crescent, Marsengo Rd and South Street
- 510 Murdoch Station to Booragoon Bus Station – serves Murdoch Drive
- 511 Murdoch Station to Fremantle Station – serves Murdoch Drive
- 513 Murdoch Station to Fremantle Station – serves South Street
- 915 Bull Creek Station to Fremantle Station (high frequency) – serves Leach Highway

Bus routes serving Bull Creek Station only:

- 178 and 179 Bull Creek Station to Elizabeth Quay Bus Station
- 500 Bull Creek Station to Booragoon Bus Station
- 506 Bull Creek Station to Parkwood
- 507, 508 and 509 Bull Creek Station to Cannington Station

=== Rail ===
- Mandurah Line
  - Bull Creek Station
