= Mount Pleasant, Western Australia =

Mount Pleasant
- Suburb
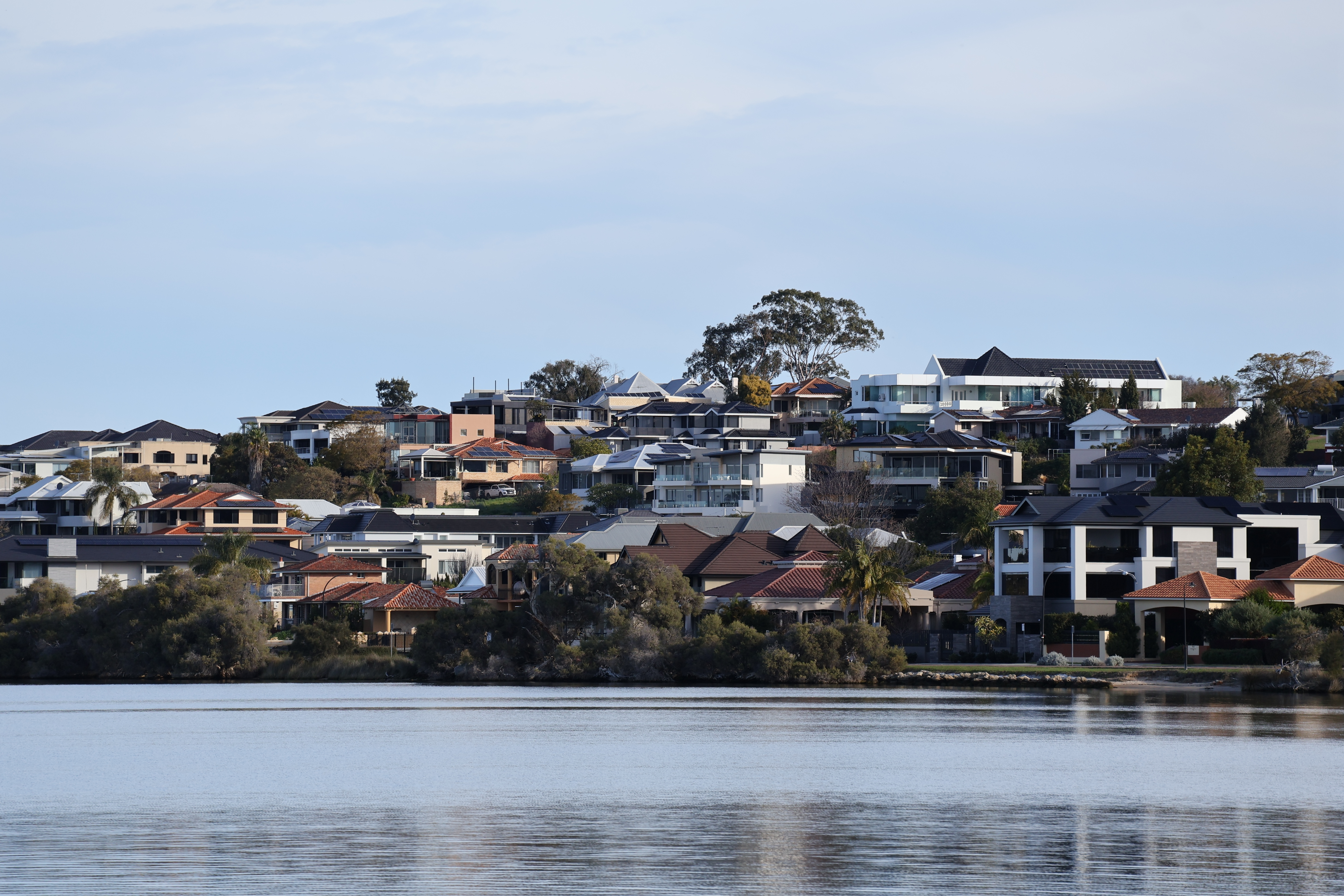
- Mount Pleasant viewed across the Canning River from Deep Water Point
- Interactive map of Mount Pleasant
- Coordinates: 32°01′42″S 115°50′56″E
- Country: Australia
- State: Western Australia
- City: Perth
- LGA: City of Melville
- Established: 1911

Government
  - State electorate: Bateman and Riverton
  - Federal division: Tangney

Population
  - Total: 7,456 (SAL 2021)
- Postcode: 6153
Suburbs around Mount Pleasant
Applecross	Applecross	Como
Ardross	Mount Pleasant	Salter Point
Booragoon	Brentwood	Rossmoyne

Mount Pleasant is an affluent suburb of Perth, Western Australia, located within Wajuk country, and the City of Melville, on the Canning River. It is bounded by Canning Highway to the north, the Canning River to the east, Cranford Avenue, Moolyeen Road and Canning Avenue to the south, and Rogerson Road, Coomoora Road, Henley Road and Ardross Street to the west.

Mount Pleasant Primary School is located entirely within the boundaries of Mount Pleasant, and Brentwood Primary School abuts Mount Pleasant in the south west of Mount Pleasant just south of Blue Gum Park.

== Transport ==
=== Bus ===
- 111 WACA Ground to Fremantle Station – serves Canning Highway
- 114 Elizabeth Quay Bus Station to Lake Coogee – serves Canning Highway
- 115 Elizabeth Quay Bus Station to Hamilton Hill Memorial Hall – serves Canning Highway
- 160 WACA Ground to Fremantle Station – serves Canning Highway, Reynolds Road and Coomoora Road
- 500 Booragoon Bus Station to Bull Creek Station – serves Canning Avenue and Bateman Road
- 910 Perth Busport to Fremantle Station (high frequency) – serves Canning Highway

== Photos of the suburb ==
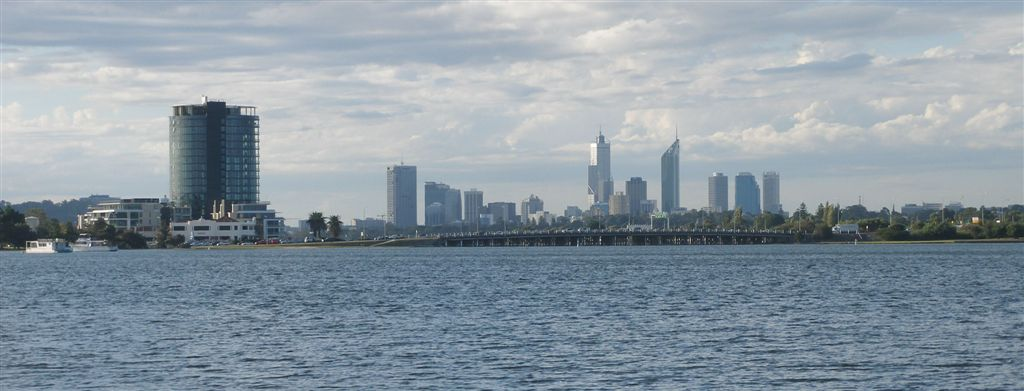
Canning Bridge and Perth CBD as viewed from Mount Pleasant

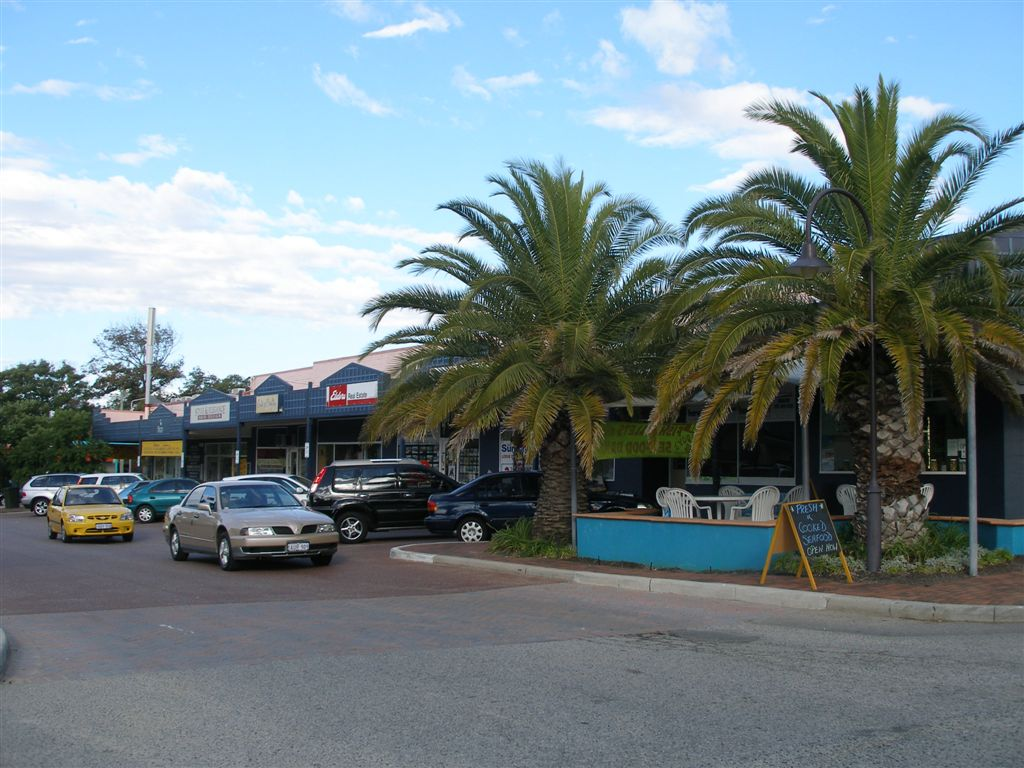
Queens Road shopping precinct

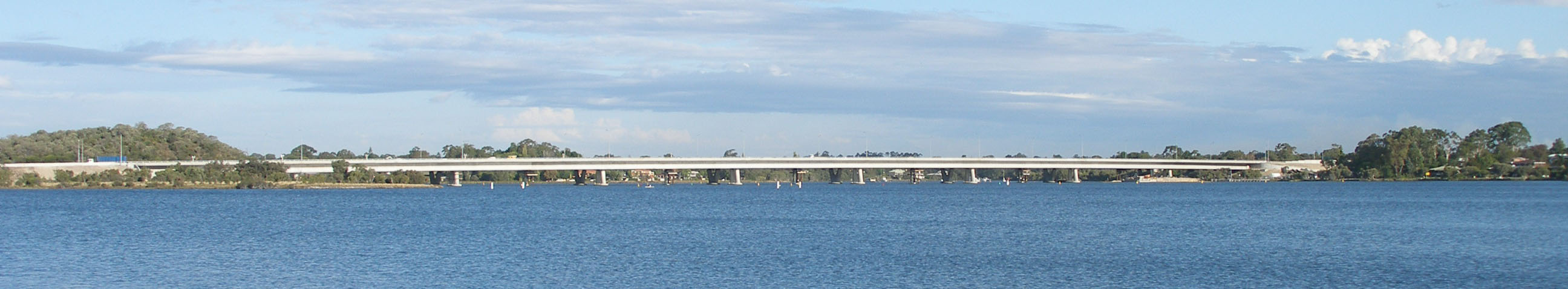
Mount Henry Bridge, taken from Deep Water Point
