= Preston Point =

Point into Swan River, Western Australia

Coordinates: 32.027°S 115.762°E

Preston Point (Nyungar: Niergarup) is a small point in the Swan River, in Perth, Western Australia. It is located on the south side of the river, in an area bordering the suburbs of East Fremantle and Bicton, about 12 kilometres (7.5 mi) south west of the city centre. On the other side of the river is Rocky Bay and the suburbs of North Fremantle and Mosman Park.

It was named by James Stirling in 1827 after Lieutenant William Preston.

Prior to European settlement, the location was known to the Noongar indigenous people as Niergarup, which means 'place of the salmon', and it was an important ceremonial and camping area.
