= City of Melville =

Coordinates: 32°02′20″S 115°49′52″E

- Local government area
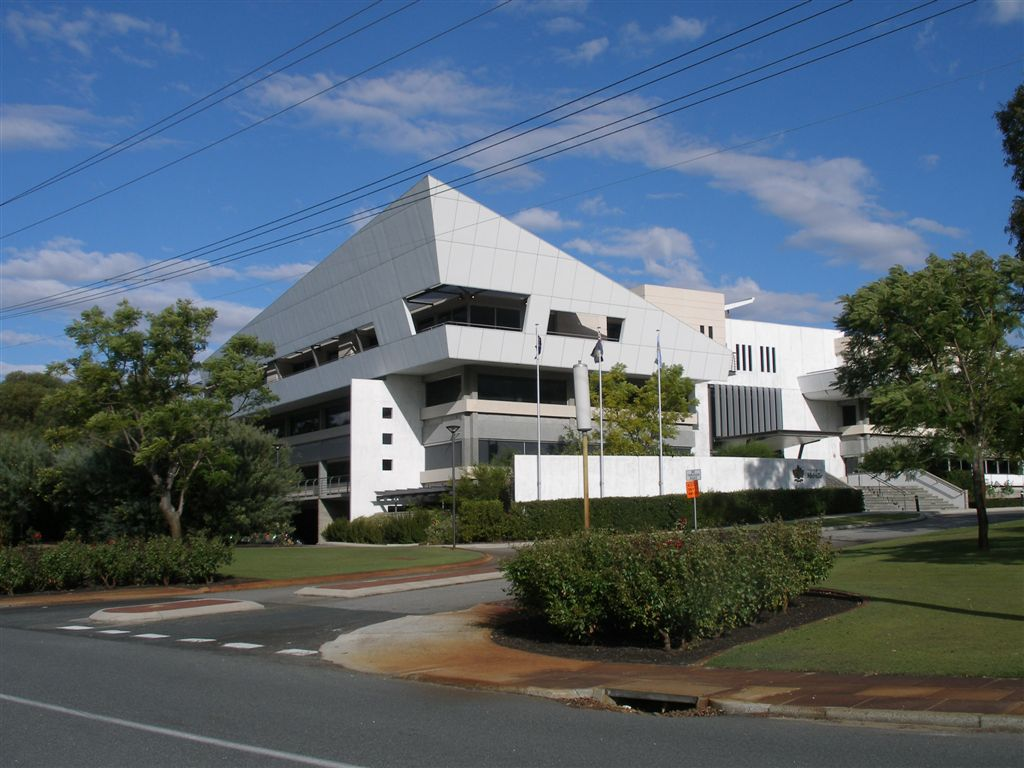
- City of Melville Council Offices

- Interactive map of City of Melville
- Country: Australia
- State: Western Australia
- Region: South Metropolitan Perth
- Established: 1900
- Council seat: Booragoon

Government
  - Mayor: Katy Mair
  - State electorate: Willagee, Alfred Cove, Bateman, Fremantle, Riverton
  - Federal division: Tangney, Fremantle

Area
  - Total: 52.73 km^{2} (20.36 sq mi)

Population
  - Total: 103,523 (LGA 2021)
- Website: City of Melville
LGAs around City of Melville
East Fremantle	Swan River	South Perth
Fremantle	City of Melville	Canning
Fremantle	Cockburn	Cockburn

The City of Melville is a local government area in the southern suburbs of the Western Australian capital city of Perth, east of the port city of Fremantle and about 12 kilometres (7.5 mi) south of Perth's central business district. The City covers an area of 52.73 square kilometres (20.36 sq mi) and had a population of about 98,000 as at the 2016 Census.

== History ==
Melville was originally established on 14 December 1900 as the East Fremantle Road District under the Roads Boards Act 1871. It was renamed the Melville Road District six months later on 14 June 1901. On 20 July 1923, it received a large amount of land from Jandakot Road District when that entity was abolished.

On 1 July 1961, it became the Shire of Melville following the enactment of the Local Government Act 1960, which reformed all remaining road districts into shires. It was granted town status as the Town of Melville on 28 September 1962, and assumed its current name when it was granted city status on 3 May 1968.

The City of Melville maintains 463 km of roads and 2.10 km² of parks and gardens.

== Wards ==
The City is divided into six wards, each represented by two councillors. Each councillor serves a four-year term, and half-elections are held every two years. The mayor is directly elected.

- Applecross-Mount Pleasant Ward
- Bateman-Kardinya-Murdoch Ward
- Bicton-Attadale-Alfred Cove Ward
- Bull Creek-Leeming Ward
- Central Ward
- Palmyra-Melville-Willagee Ward

== Suburbs ==
The suburbs of the City of Melville with population and size figures based on the most recent Australian census:

Suburb	Population	Area	Map
Alfred Cove	2,830 (SAL 2021)	1.1 km^{2} (0.42 sq mi)	
Applecross	7,228 (SAL 2021)	3.3 km^{2} (1.3 sq mi)	
Ardross	4,578 (SAL 2021)	2.2 km^{2} (0.85 sq mi)	
Attadale	6,638 (SAL 2021)	3.1 km^{2} (1.2 sq mi)	
Bateman	3,832 (SAL 2021)	1.9 km^{2} (0.73 sq mi)	
Bicton	6,961 (SAL 2021)	3.1 km^{2} (1.2 sq mi)	
Booragoon	5,684 (SAL 2021)	3.1 km^{2} (1.2 sq mi)	
Brentwood	2,153 (SAL 2021)	0.9 km^{2} (0.35 sq mi)	
Bull Creek	8,030 (SAL 2021)	4.2 km^{2} (1.6 sq mi)	
Kardinya	9,137 (SAL 2021)	4.4 km^{2} (1.7 sq mi)	
Leeming *	10,883 (SAL 2021)	7.5 km^{2} (2.9 sq mi)	
Melville	6,204 (SAL 2021)	2.4 km^{2} (0.93 sq mi)	
Mount Pleasant	7,456 (SAL 2021)	2.8 km^{2} (1.1 sq mi)	
Murdoch	3,352 (SAL 2021)	4.3 km^{2} (1.7 sq mi)	
Myaree	2,105 (SAL 2021)	1.3 km^{2} (0.50 sq mi)	
Palmyra	7,585 (SAL 2021)	3.1 km^{2} (1.2 sq mi)	
Willagee	5,447 (SAL 2021)	2.1 km^{2} (0.81 sq mi)	
Winthrop	6,020 (SAL 2021)	3.5 km^{2} (1.4 sq mi)	

(* indicates suburb partially located within City)

== Indigenous sites of significance ==
There are several significant Noongar sites within the City of Melville precinct.

- Niergarup
- Quaada Gabee
- Jenalup
- Dyoondalup
- Marradungup
- Wireless Hill

== Population ==
Historical population

Year	Pop.	±% p.a.
1911	565	—
1921	2,360	+15.37%
1933	4,628	+5.77%
1947	7,547	+3.55%
1954	19,810	+14.78%
1961	39,207	+10.24%
1966	47,887	+4.08%
1971	52,976	+2.04%
1976	54,384	+0.53%

Year	Pop.	±% p.a.
1981	61,211	+2.39%
1986	67,131	+1.86%
1991	84,369	+4.68%
1996	88,422	+0.94%
2001	90,264	+0.41%
2006	93,003	+0.60%
2011	95,700	+0.57%
2016	98,083	+0.49%
2021	103,523	+1.09%

== Mayors ==
The incumbent Mayor of the City of Melville is Katy Mair, who has held the position since 2023. She defeated previous Mayor George Gear during the 2023 Local Government elections. This is her second term as Mayor, having previously held the position under her married name Katherine Jackson between 1995 and 2007.

== Heritage-listed places ==
As of 2024, 172 places are heritage-listed in the City of Melville, of which 24 are on the State Register of Heritage Places, among them Canning Bridge and Wireless Hill Park.

== Sports and recreation ==
The City is home to 23 active reserves, 100+ passive reserves and two leisure centres featuring indoor courts and 50m and 25m indoor heated pools.
