= Electoral district of Bateman =

State electoral district of Western Australia

Bateman Western Australia—Legislative Assembly
- Interactive map of electoral district boundaries from the 2025 state election
- State: Western Australia
- Dates current: 2008–present
- MP: Kim Giddens
- Party: Labor
- Namesake: Bateman
- Electors: 31,547 (2025)
- Area: 21 km^{2} (8.1 sq mi)
- Demographic: Metropolitan
- Coordinates: 32.03°S 115.93°E
Electorates around Bateman:
Nedlands		South Perth
Bicton	Bateman	Riverton
Bibra Lake		Jandakot

Bateman is an electoral district of the Legislative Assembly in the Australian state of Western Australia.

The district shares its name with the southern Perth suburb of Bateman, situated in the central part of the electorate. Both the electorate and the suburb are named after members of the Bateman family, who established their home, "Grasmere", at nearby Bulls Creek, in 1886. The seat was created as a result of the 2007 electoral redistribution, largely replacing the former Murdoch electorate. Bateman was regarded as a safe Liberal seat, because Murdoch (itself largely replaced by Jandakot between 1989 and 1996) had been held by the party since the seat's creation in 1977.

== Members for Bateman ==
Member	Party	Term
Christian Porter	Liberal	2008–2013
Matt Taylor	Liberal	2013–2017
Dean Nalder	Liberal	2017–2021
Kim Giddens	Labor	2021–present

== Election results ==
2025 Western Australian state election: Bateman
Party	Candidate	Votes	%	±%
Labor	Kim Giddens	11,093	40.2	−5.6
Liberal	Nitin Vashisht	9,455	34.3	−2.7
Greens	Juanita Doorey	2,910	10.5	+3.7
National	Donna Gordin	1,689	6.1	+6.1
Christians	Kirsty Robbie	1,000	3.6	+0.7
One Nation	Michael Mabood	478	1.7	+0.9
Independent	Tony Stokes	431	1.6	+1.6
Animal Justice	Colleen Saporita	353	1.3	+1.3
Libertarian	Anahita Ghassemifar	180	0.7	−0.6
Total formal votes		27,589	96.6	−0.6
Informal votes		962	3.4	+0.6
Turnout		28,551	90.5	+2.9
Two-party-preferred result
Labor	Kim Giddens	14,700	53.3	−3.4
Liberal	Nitin Vashisht	12,881	46.7	+3.4
Labor hold		Swing	−3.4	
