= Ranford Road =

Road in Perth, Western Australia

Ranford Road Western Australia

General information
- Type: Road
- Length: 12.3 km (7.6 mi)
- Route number(s): State Route 13

Major junctions
- Northwest end: South Street (State Route 13), Canning Vale
- Bannister Road; Nicholson Road (State Route 31); Tonkin Highway (State Route 4)
- Southeast end: Armadale Road (State Route 14), Forrestdale

Location(s)
- Major suburbs: Canning Vale, Harrisdale, Southern River, Forrestdale

Ranford Road is a major road in the southeastern suburbs of Perth, Western Australia, and services a number of housing estates in Canning Vale and Southern River, as well as forming part of one of the two major routes between the port city of Fremantle and Armadale. It continues from South Street, a major east–west route in the southern suburbs which now also provides access to the Kwinana Freeway and Murdoch railway station.

It is part of State Route 13.

== History ==
Prior to 1985 Ranford Road went from Westfield Road (now Lake Road) in Forrestdale to Nicholson Road in Canning Vale. In that year expansion commenced and finished to its current terminus at Bannister Road Canning Vale.

Ranford Road was upgraded to a dual carriageway between Warton Road and Tonkin Highway. This project was completed in November 2014, costing around A$12.3 million, which was jointly funded by the Metropolitan Redevelopment Authority and the City of Armadale.

In August 2020, construction began on a new Ranford Road Bridge over the Kwinana freight railway as part of the Thornlie-Cockburn Link works. The new bridge, which is higher and longer, will carry six traffic lanes and a dedicated bus lane. Traffic switched to part of the new bridge on 16 November 2021. Construction was completed by mid-2023. Construction for the new Ranford Road railway station began on the new bridge over the freight railway line as part of the Thornlie-Cockburn Line project by Metronet (Western Australia). The station opened on 8 June 2025 and provides services south to Cockburn Central railway station and north via Thornlie railway station to Perth railway station.

== Major intersections ==
LGA	Location	km	mi	Destinations	Notes
Canning	Canning Vale	0.0	0.0	Bannister Road	Northwestern terminus. Continues as South Street (State Route 13) to Murdoch, Perth and Fremantle. Traffic light intersection
Canning	Canning Vale	0.9	0.56	Jandakot East Link Road	Traffic light intersection. Access to Ranford Road railway station
Canning	Canning Vale	1.6	0.99	Waratah Avenue	Traffic light intersection
Canning	Canning Vale	2.7	1.7	Queensgate Drive	Access to Livingston Marketplace shopping centre. Traffic light intersection
Canning	Canning Vale	3.0	1.9	Nicholson Road (State Route 31) – Cannington, Thornlie, Piara Waters, Oakford	Traffic light intersection
Canning	Canning Vale	3.9	2.4	Campbell Road	Traffic light intersection
Canning–Gosnells–Armadale tripoint	Canning Vale–Southern River–Harrisdale tripoint	4.9	3.0	Warton Road – Jandakot, Huntingdale, Maddington	Traffic light intersection
Gosnells–Armadale boundary	Southern River–Harrisdale boundary	5.9	3.7	Bristle Avenue northeast bound / Wright Road southwest bound – Huntingdale, Piara Waters	Traffic light intersection
Gosnells–Armadale boundary	Southern River–Harrisdale boundary	7.2	4.5	Southern River Road – Gosnells	Roundabout
Gosnells–Armadale boundary	Southern River–Forrestdale boundary	9.1	5.7	Anstey Road	Roundabout
Gosnells–Armadale boundary	Champion Lakes–Forrestdale–Southern River tripoint	9.5	5.9	Tonkin Highway (State Route 4) – Byford, Welshpool, Morley, Perth Airport	Traffic light intersection
Armadale	Champion Lakes–Seville Grove boundary	10.4	6.5	Alex Wood Drive	Roundabout
Armadale	Champion Lakes–Seville Grove–Forrestdale tripoint	11.2	7.0	Lake Road eastbound / Remisko Drive westbound – Camillo	Roundabout
Armadale	Seville Grove–Haynes–Forrestdale tripoint	12.3	7.6	Armadale Road (State Route 14) – Armadale, Jandakot, Cockburn Central	Southeastern terminus, continues as Twelfth Road southbound. State Route 13 southern terminus. Roundabout
1.000 mi = 1.609 km; 1.000 km = 0.621 mi: Route transition

== Speed limits ==
The road's speed limit is 70 km/h (43 mph) from Bannister Road to the edge of Southern River's metropolitan limit at Balfour Street. At that point, it increases to 80 km/h (50 mph).

== Features ==
Main features located on the road include:

- Ranford Road railway station
- Market City (Canning Vale)
- Livingston Marketplace Shopping Centre
- Gosnells Golf Club
- WA Kennel Association
- Southern River Shopping Centre
- Housing estates (Boardwalk, Sanctuary Waters, The Avenues, Ranford, Livingston).
