= Nicholson Road =

Road in Perth, Western Australia

Nicholson Road Western Australia
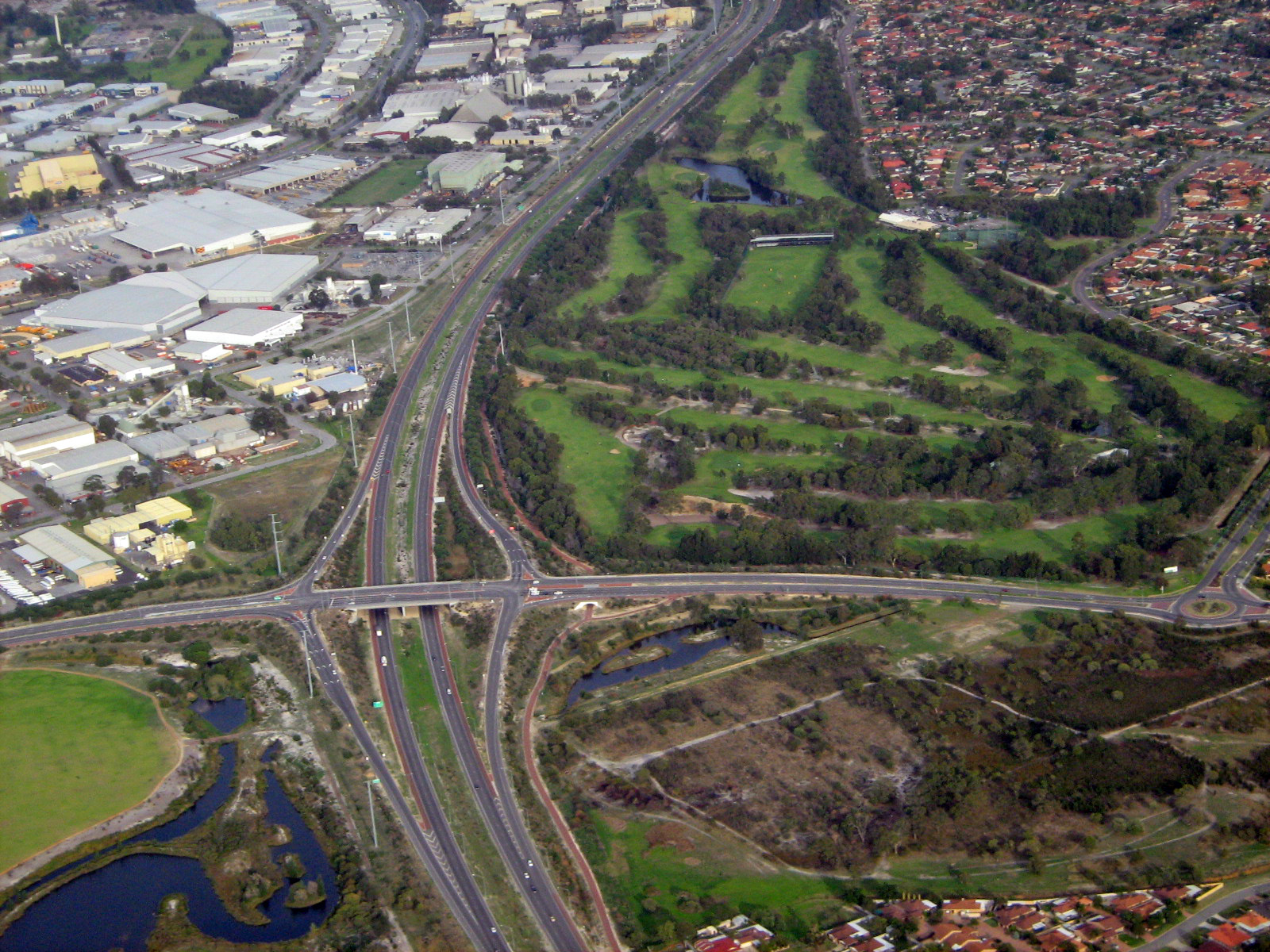
- Intersection of Roe Highway at Nicholson Road

General information
- Type: Road
- Length: 24 km (15 mi)
- Opened: 1960s
- Route number(s): State Route 31

Major junctions
- North end: Albany Highway (State Route 30), Cannington
- High Road (State Route 27); Roe Highway (State Route 3); Ranford Road (State Route 13); Armadale Road (State Route 14)
- South end: Thomas Road (State Route 21), Oakford

Location(s)
- Major suburbs: Lynwood, Thornlie, Canning Vale

Nicholson Road is a major north–south road in the southeastern suburbs of Perth, Western Australia, connecting Albany Highway in Cannington with the large residential areas of Thornlie and Canning Vale, before leaving the Perth urban area and terminating in Oakford.

Nicholson Road is allocated State Route 31.

== History ==
Nicholson Road is named after William Nicholson, who established a 1,000 acre property named "Canning Vale" in the late 19th century, a name subsequently applied to the surrounding area.

Until the construction of Kwinana Freeway to Thomas Road in 1993, Nicholson Road was one of southern Perth's most important routes.

Nicholson Road formerly crossed the Kwinana freight railway at a level crossing. Construction of a six-lane road bridge over the rail line to replace the crossing began in May 2017 and was completed in March 2018.

In late 2020, construction of Nicholson Road railway station at the road bridge began as part of the new Thornlie-Cockburn Line project by Metronet. The station opened on 8 June 2025 and provides services south to Cockburn Central and north via Thornlie to Perth

== Major intersections ==
All intersections below are at-grade except for the intersections with Roe Highway and Armadale Road, which are grade-separated interchanges in favour of those two roads over Nicholson Road.

LGA	Location	km	mi	Destinations	Notes
Gosnells	Beckenham	0.0	0.0	Albany Highway (State Route 30) – Perth, Cannington, Gosnells, Armadale	Traffic light intersection with bus priority slip lanes
Canning River		0.5	0.31	Nicholson Road Bridge	
Canning–Gosnells boundary	Ferndale–Langford boundary	0.8	0.50	Spencer Road (State Route 36) – Thornlie, Gosnells, Huntingdale, Kelmscott	Traffic light intersection
Canning–Gosnells boundary	Langford–Lynwood–Parkwood tripoint	1.0	0.62	Metcalfe Road – Parkwood	Unsignalised intersection
Canning–Gosnells boundary	Langford–Parkwood–Lynwood tripoint	2.9	1.8	High Road (State Route 27) – Riverton, Willetton, Fremantle	Roundabout
Canning–Gosnells boundary	Lynwood–Langford–Thornlie–Canning Vale quadripoint	3.5	2.2	Roe Highway (State Route 3) – Forrestfield, Jandakot, Midland, Perth Airport	Signalised diamond interchange favouring Roe Highway
Canning–Gosnells boundary	Thornlie–Canning Vale boundary	4.0	2.5	Wilfred Road east / Bannister Road west	Signalised intersection
Canning–Gosnells boundary	Thornlie–Canning Vale boundary	4.6	2.9	Yale Road east / Garden Street south – Kenwick, Huntingdale	Roundabout. Nicholson Road traffic need to use the third exit if going southbound. Slip roads are available for Nicholson Road northbound and turning from Nicholson-south onto Yale Road
Canning–Gosnells boundary	Canning Vale	5.2	3.2	Panama Street	Signalised intersection, access to Nicholson Road railway station
Canning–Gosnells boundary	Canning Vale	6.2	3.9	Amherst Road	Signalised intersection
Canning–Gosnells boundary	Canning Vale	8.3	5.2	Ranford Road (State Route 13) – Willetton, Fremantle, Armadale, Murdoch University	Signalised intersection
Canning–Gosnells–Armadale–Cockburn quadripoint	Canning Vale–Harrisdale–Piara Waters–Treeby quadripoint	11.3	7.0	Warton Road – Jandakot, Huntingdale, Southern River	Roundabout
Armadale	Harrisdale–Piara Waters boundary	12.4	7.7	Wright Road – Forrestdale, Southern River	Roundabout
Armadale	Harrisdale–Piara Waters boundary	12.8	8.0	Easthope Link east / Broadway Boulevard west	Roundabout
Armadale	Harrisdale–Piara Waters boundary	13.1	8.1	Yellowwood Avenue	Signalised intersection
Armadale	Harrisdale–Piara Waters boundary	12.8	8.0	Exchange Avenue east / Mason Road west – Treeby, Jandakot	Roundabout
Armadale	Forrestdale–Piara Waters boundary	14.2	8.8	Riva Entrance east / Piara Drive west	Roundabout
Armadale	Forrestdale–Piara Waters boundary	15.0	9.3	Greywacke Entrance west	Roundabout
Armadale	Forrestdale–Piara Waters boundary	15.4	9.6	Armadale Road (State Route 14) – Banjup, Seville Grove, Cockburn Central, Armadale	Roundabout interchange favouring Armadale Road. Overpass known as the Hugo Throssell VC Bridge
Armadale–Serpentine–Jarrahdale boundary	Forrestdale–Oakford boundary	19.0	11.8	Rowley Road – Banjup, Hilbert, Darling Downs, Hammond Park	Unsignalised, staggered T-intersections favouring Nicholson Road
Serpentine–Jarrahdale	Oakford	21.7	13.5	Thomas Road (State Route 21) – Casuarina, Byford, Kwinana Beach	Unsignalised, staggered T-intersections favouring Thomas Road. State Route 31 southern terminus. Note the road southbound reduces in quality to a one lane seal.
Serpentine–Jarrahdale	Oakford	23.8	14.8	Abernethy Road – Byford	Nicholson Road ends at a sharp eastbound curve to become Abernethy Road
Route transition
