= High Road (Perth) =

Road in Perth, Australia

High Road Western Australia
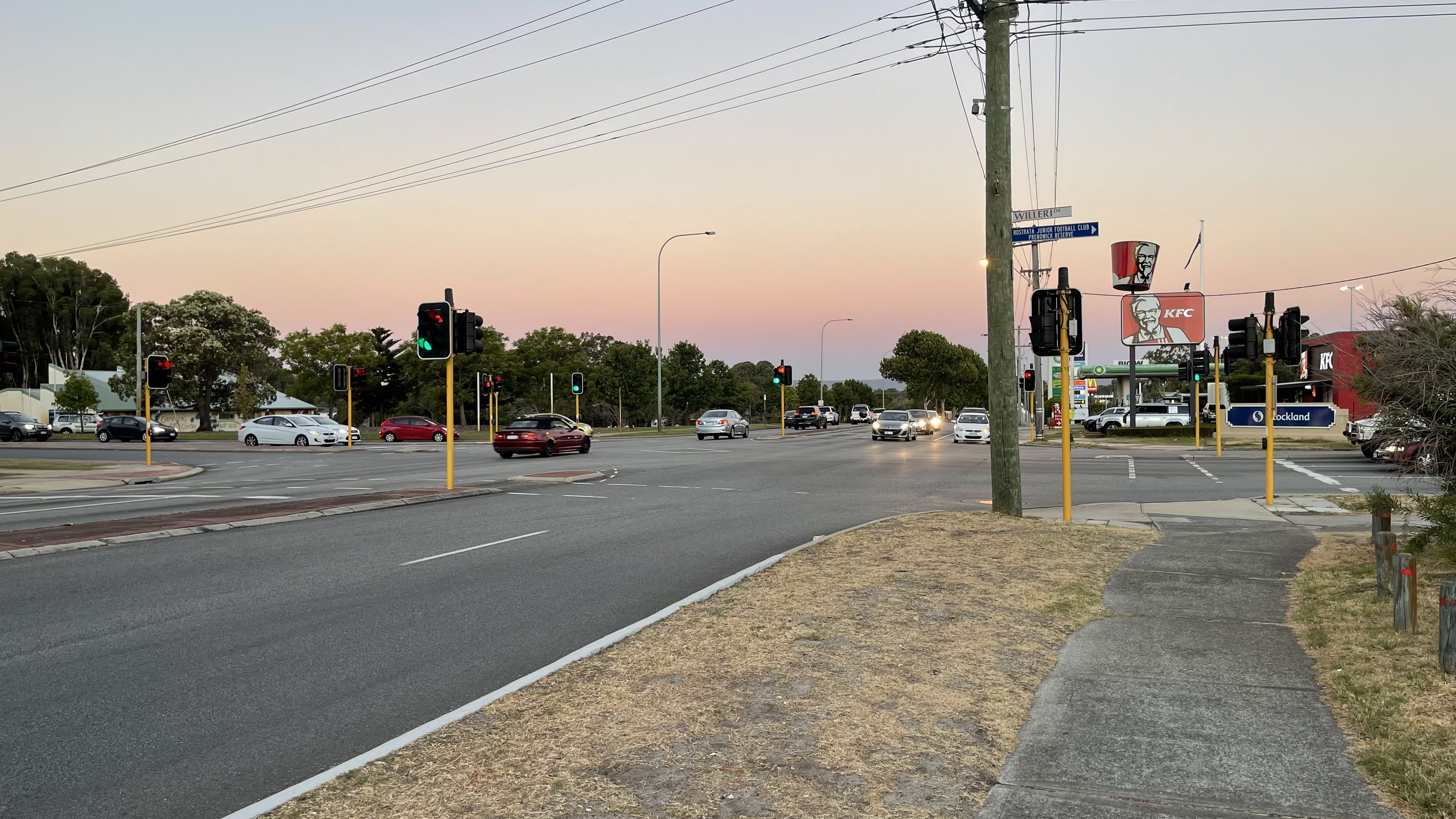
- Looking at intersection of High Road and Willeri Drive from west.

General information
- Type: Road
- Length: 5.4 km (3.4 mi)
- Route number(s): State Route 27

Major junctions
- East end: Leach Highway (State Route 7), Shelley
- West end: Nicholson Road (State Route 31), Langford

Location(s)
- Major suburbs: Lynwood, Parkwood, Ferndale, Riverton, Willetton

High Road is a major road running through Lynwood, Parkwood, Ferndale, Riverton, and Willetton in the south-east of Perth, Western Australia. It connects the major roads Leach Highway, and Albany Highway via Nicholson Road, originally built to provide the Gosnells area with direct access to the port city of Fremantle.

It is allocated State Route 27.

== Major intersections ==
All major intersections, except Nicholson Road, are controlled by traffic lights.

LGA	Location	km	mi	Destinations	Notes
Canning	Riverton, Shelley, Willetton tripoint	0.0	0.0	Leach Highway (State Route 30) – Perth, Fremantle, Welshpool, Perth Airport	Western terminus. State Route 27 western terminus.
Canning	Riverton, Willetton boundary	0.0	0.0	Wavel Avenue northbound / Herald Avenue southbound	
Canning	Riverton, Willetton boundary	10.1	6.3	Vahland Avenue south – Shelley, Leeming	
Canning	Riverton, Parkwood, Willetton tripoint	0.0	0.0	Riley Road northbound / Willeri Drive southbound Shelley, Canning Vale	
Canning	Ferndale, Lynwood, Parkwood tripoint	0.0	0.0	Metcalfe Road	
Canning–Gosnells boundary	Langford, Parkwood, Lynwood tripoint	2.9	1.8	Nicholson Road (State Route 31) – Cannington, Canning Vale, Piara Waters	Eastern terminus at roundabout. State Route 27 eastern terminus.
Concurrency terminus
