= Lynwood, Western Australia =

Lynwood
- Suburb
- Looking southeast down Lynwood Avenue
- Interactive map of Lynwood
- Coordinates: 32°02′24″S 115°55′44″E
- Country: Australia
- State: Western Australia
- City: Perth
- LGA: City of Canning
- Location: 13.3 km (8.3 mi) from the Perth CBD
- Established: 1965

Government
  - State electorate: Cannington
  - Federal division: Tangney

Area
  - Total: 1.8 km^{2} (0.69 sq mi)

Population
  - Total: 3,541 (SAL 2021)
- Postcode: 6147
Suburbs around Lynwood
Ferndale		Cannington
Parkwood	Lynwood	Langford
	Riverton

Lynwood is a small southeastern suburb of Perth, the capital city of Western Australia. Its local government area is the City of Canning.

== History ==
Lynwood was first settled by Henry Willett of Willett & Co, who was granted Canning Location 21 on the Canning River (which included nearby Parkwood) and settled in the area in June 1832. In November 1964, the Shire of Canning proposed the names Burtsdale and Willetton for Willetton and Lynwood respectively, the name Burtsdale honouring Septimus Burt, who purchased the land in 1882. In August 1965, developers at Lynwood requested the name Clovercrest Estate, but finally agreed to Lynwood. The name Willetton was shifted westwards and Lynwood was gazetted in December 1965. Parkwood was part of Lynwood until 1993.

In the 1960s and 1970s, Lynwood and neighbouring Parkwood were largely settled by new migrants from the UK who arrived in Perth seeking economic prosperity.

== Geography ==
Lynwood is approximately 13.3 kilometres (8.3 mi) from the central business district of Perth, and is bound by High Road to the south and south-west, Nicholson Road to the east and Metcalfe Road to the north and north-west. The Canning River is about 300 metres (1,000 ft) north-east of the suburb's boundary.

The Bannister Creek Park runs through the southern part of Lynwood.

== Facilities ==
Lynwood is a residential suburb with a series of parks connecting along Bannister Creek and parallel to Nicholson Road. It contains a neighbourhood shopping centre with supermarket, post office, estate agency, and a number of food outlets, as well as a community hall and a primary school completed in 2010, which also services the adjoining suburb of Ferndale. Lynwood Senior High School, built in 1975, is in nearby Parkwood.

In nearby suburbs, the Riverton Forum and Westfield Carousel shopping centres are less than 2 km (1 mi) away, as is the Riverton Leisureplex, a large facility with sporting, fitness and recreation facilities that opened on 9 November 2001, operated by the City of Canning and including the council's largest library. Parkwood Shopping Centre was built in 1979, but was demolished due to low patronage, and now only consists of a few convenience stores and a small medical clinic. The Lynwood Arms Hotel, a local pub on Metcalfe Road, built in the early 1970s, was demolished in 2014 to make way for an upmarket medium-density housing development.

As at the late 2010s, Lynwood was one of the few suburbs, as with Heathridge, Beldon and Craigie up north, where you could see uninterrupted stretches of 1970s housing with the long narrow windows, dark brown colourings, and numerous arches. In other areas, redevelopment has taken place at rapid rates, and streetscapes have become unrecognizable.

== Transport ==
Lynwood is served by Transperth bus services from Cannington, which link it to the central business district. All services are operated by Swan Transit.

=== Bus ===
- 206 Cannington Station to Murdoch University – serves Nicholson Road
- 208 Cannington Station to Murdoch Station – serves Nicholson Road
- 506 Parkwood to Bull Creek Station – serves High Road
- 507 Cannington Station to Bull Creek Station – serves Metcalfe Road, Lynwood Avenue, Woodford Road and Iveston Road
- 508 Cannington Station to Bull Creek Station – serves Metcalfe Road

== Politics ==
Lynwood has a changing mixed-ethnic population. It generally supports the Australian Labor Party at both federal and state elections.
