= Ferndale, Western Australia =

Ferndale Perth, Western Australia
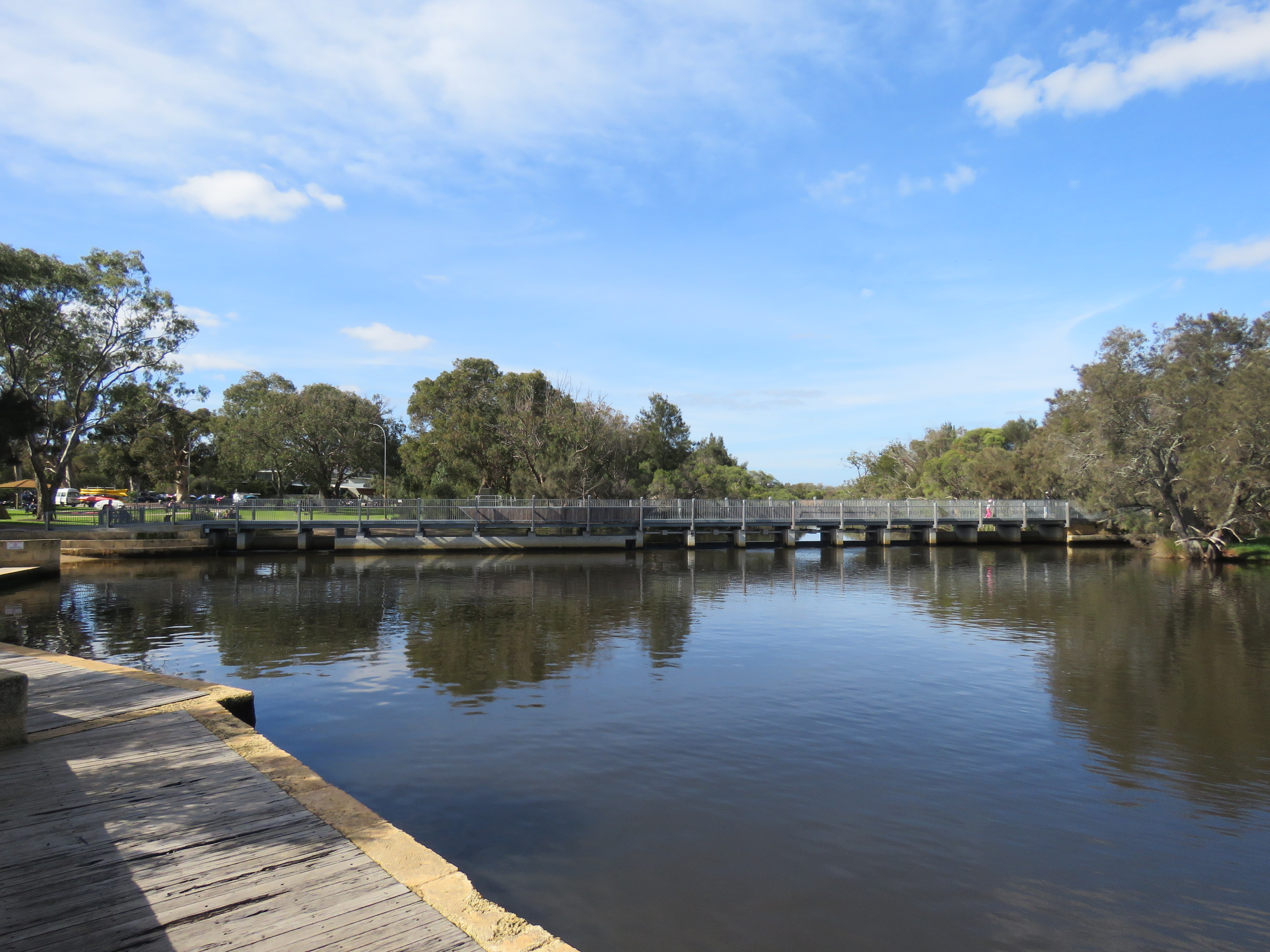
- Kent Street Weir, Canning River Regional Park, viewed from the Wilson side of Canning River and with Ferndale on the right of the image.
- Coordinates: 32°01′46″S 115°55′29″E
- Population: 4,457 (SAL 2021)
- Established: 1970s
- Postcode(s): 6148
- Area: 3.6 km^{2} (1.4 sq mi)
- Location: 15 km (9 mi) from Perth
- LGA(s): City of Canning
- State electorate(s): Cannington
- Federal division(s): Swan
Suburbs around Ferndale:
Wilson	Wilson	Cannington
Riverton	Ferndale	Beckenham
Parkwood	Lynwood	Langford

Ferndale is a southeastern suburb of Perth, Western Australia. Its local government area is the City of Canning. It is approximately 15 kilometres (9 mi) from Perth's central business district.

== History ==
The name Ferndale originated from developers who decided not to proceed with the City of Canning's choice of Shearnstead. In 1965, the name change was approved. The eastern section of Ferndale Crescent was once Menzies Road. Low scrub forest covered most of the suburb until developed in the late 1960s and 1970s.

== Geography ==
Ferndale is bounded by Metcalfe Road to the south-east, the Canning River to the north and north-west, and Bannister Creek to the south-west. Its main street is Ferndale Crescent, which runs like an inverted U-shape from Metcalfe Road – the eastern leg of the street serves as a "centre line" to divide south-west and north-east Ferndale.

== Facilities ==
Prominent features of the suburb also include Ferndale Reserve, a large sports ground; and the small Ferndale Shopping Centre. The Canning River Regional Park, located in Ferndale's north, is a popular route for cycling and walking as it is the parkland of the Canning River.

There were two primary schools in the suburb for several decades: Ferndale Primary, located in west Ferndale; and Kinlock Primary in the east. However, Kinlock closed following the 2007 school year, along with Lynwood Primary in a neighbouring suburb. In 2008, students from those two schools moved to Ferndale Primary School. At the end of the 2009 school year, Ferndale Primary closed and was replaced by Bannister Creek Primary, which had been built on the former Lynwood Primary school site. Bannister derives its name from the creek that starts in Lynwood and passes through Ferndale, where it discharges into the Canning River. Each of the primary schools mentioned were and are feeder schools to Lynwood Senior High School, the main secondary school of the surrounding suburbs.

There are cricket and football grounds along Metcalfe Road. The cricket grounds are shared with facilities of a club nicknamed Faries. Similarly, the football grounds are shared with facilities of a club nicknamed Panthers.

== Transport ==
Ferndale's main road, Metcalfe Road, links two routes – Nicholson Road, which links Ferndale to Cannington and Westfield Carousel, and High Road, linking to Riverton and the Bull Creek railway station.

Ferndale is served by the Transperth bus service 508 linking the area to Bull Creek and to Cannington. It is operated by Swan Transit. Prior to the commencement of the Mandurah railway line, Transperth operated two routes through Ferndale (877 and 878), which had linked the suburb to Perth via Willetton and the Kwinana Freeway.

=== Bus ===
- 206 Cannington Station to Murdoch University – serves Nicholson Road
- 208 Cannington Station to Murdoch Station – serves Nicholson Road
- 507 Cannington Station to Bull Creek Station – serves Nicholson Road and Metcalfe Road
- 508 Cannington Station to Bull Creek Station – serves Nicholson Road, Metcalfe Road, Grace Street, Willcock Street, Ferndale Crescent and High Road
