= Willetton, Western Australia =

Willetton
- Suburb
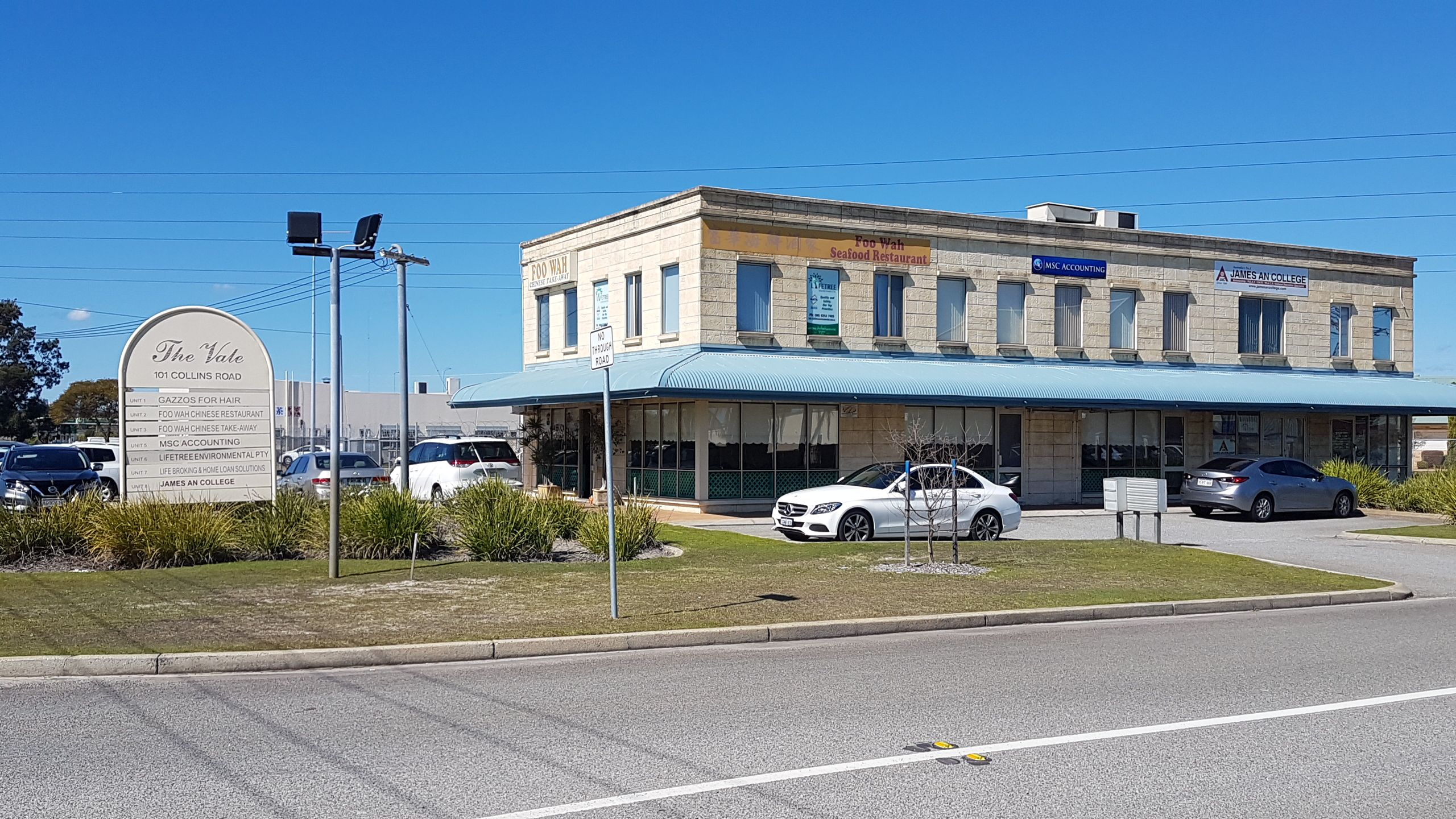
- "The Vale", a business premises on Collins Road, Willetton
- Interactive map of Willetton
- Coordinates: 32°03′09″S 115°53′16″E
- Country: Australia
- State: Western Australia
- City: Perth
- LGA: City of Canning
- Location: 12 km (7.5 mi) from Perth City
- Established: 1970s

Government
  - State electorate: Riverton
  - Federal division: Tangney

Area
  - Total: 8.6 km^{2} (3.3 sq mi)

Population
  - Total: 19,262 (SAL 2021)
- Postcode: 6155
Suburbs around Willetton
Rossmoyne	Riverton	Ferndale
Bull Creek	Willetton	Parkwood
Leeming	Leeming	Canning Vale

Willetton is a large southern suburb of Perth, Western Australia. Its local government area is the City of Canning.

== History ==
Willetton's name derives from Henry Willett of Willett & Co, who was granted Canning Location 21 (roughly the location of modern Lynwood and Parkwood) and settled in the area in June 1832. In November 1964, the Shire of Canning proposed the names "Burtsdale" and "Willetton" for Willetton and Lynwood/Parkwood respectively, the name Burtsdale honouring Septimus Burt, who purchased the land in 1882. In August 1965, developers at Lynwood requested the name "Clovercrest Estate", but finally agreed to "Lynwood". The name Willetton was shifted westwards and gazetted in December 1965 within its present boundaries.

The original subdivision was opened in the early 1970s under the developer's name "Burrendah Heights". This name survives as Burrendah Boulevard and Burrendah Primary School. The section to the east of Vahland Avenue and north of Collins Road was developed in the 1980s under the unofficial name "Rostrata", from which Rostrata Primary School gets its name. Most housing and infrastructure was completed in the 1990s.

== Geography ==
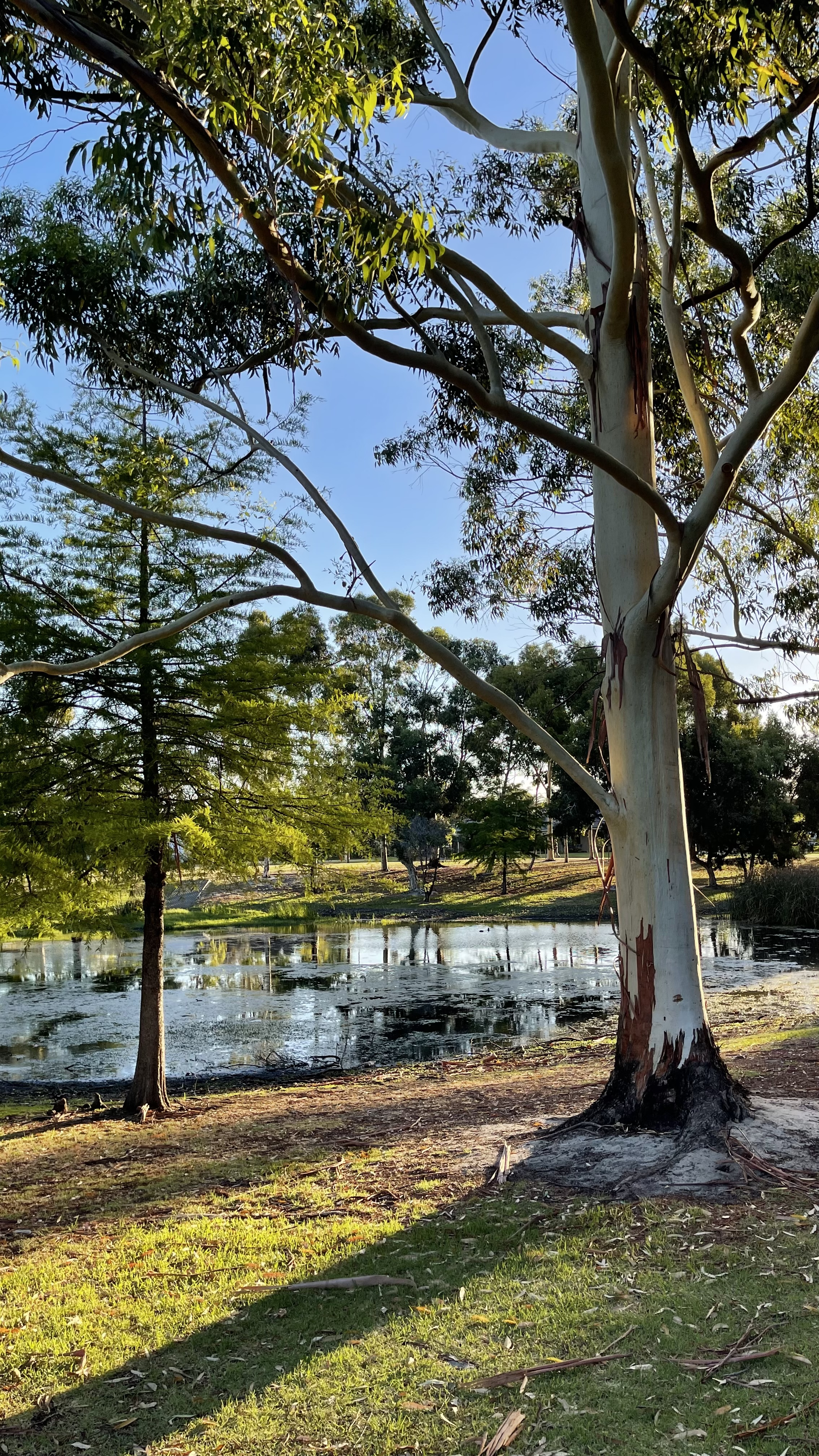
Looking west over the lake in Prendwick Park

Willetton is located about 12 kilometres (7.5 miles) south of the Perth central business district. It is built on a section of flat sandy coastal plain that was originally covered with open Banksia woodland and stands of paperbark trees marking the edges of shallow seasonal swamps.

Willetton is bounded by Karel Avenue to the west, Leach Highway and High Road to the north, Willeri Drive to the east and South Street and Roe Highway to the south. Vahland Avenue runs north-south through the suburb.

The population has seen a steady increase in the past 20 years, with 19,262 residents recorded at the 2021 Australian census, compared to 17,569 at the 2001 census. In 2021, Willetton had a mostly average-income population of 19,262 people living in 6,159 dwellings, nearly all of which are detached houses on single lots. The five most common ancestries were Chinese (26.3%), English (23.7%), Australian (18.4%), Indian (10.9%), and Scottish (5.6%). In 2021, 33% of Willetton residents were working professionals, 12.3% were clerical and administrative workers, and 11.5% were technicians and trades workers.

== Facilities ==
Willetton contains the HomeCo. Southlands Boulevarde shopping centre, with two levels and businesses including three supermarkets, Hoyts cinemas and a food court. Opposite the shopping centre across Burrendah Boulevard is the Willetton Sports and Community Centre. A light industrial area exists in the north of the suburb near Leach Highway and High Road, containing a Bunnings, pool shops and various trades. Three small neighbourhood shopping centres offer local services in the corners of the suburb.

Adjacent to Willetton on High Road, the Riverton Leisureplex, a large facility with sporting, fitness and recreation facilities opened on 9 November 2001, is operated by the City of Canning, and includes the council's largest library. The Willetton Library is located near Southlands Boulevarde.

Willetton contains the Castlereagh, Burrendah, Willetton, Rostrata and Orana Catholic primary schools, as well as Woodthorpe School and Willetton Senior High School, one of the largest public high schools in Western Australia, with 2,729 students as of 31 December 2024.

== Transport ==
Willetton is situated between two major east-west routes – Leach Highway (west to the Bull Creek railway station, Kwinana Freeway to Perth's central business district and Fremantle; east to Cannington and Perth Airport) and South Street (west to Murdoch railway station, Murdoch University and Fremantle; east to Canning Vale and Armadale). Roe Highway is on the southeastern fringe of the suburb, while Karel Avenue (to Jandakot Airport), Vahland Avenue and Willeri Drive are major north-south routes.

Willetton contains the Southlands bus station, where the CircleRoute takes passengers to Murdoch railway station, Murdoch University and Curtin University, while other bus routes go to Cannington. All services are operated by the Public Transport Authority.

=== Bus ===
- 75 Canning Vale to Elizabeth Quay Bus Station – serves Willeri Drive
- 179 Bull Creek Station to Elizabeth Quay Bus Station – serves Leach Highway and High Road
- 506 Bull Creek Station to Parkwood – serves Burrendah Boulevard, Vahland Avenue and Collins Road
- 507 Bull Creek Station to Cannington Station – serves Burrendah Boulevard, Vahland Avenue, Collins Road, Rostrata Avenue and Killara Drive
- 508 Bull Creek Station to Cannington Station – serves Karel Avenue, Apsley Road, Vahland Avenue and High Road
- 509 Bull Creek Station to Cannington Station – serves Leach Highway and High Road
- 516 Southlands Boulevarde Shopping Centre to Murdoch Station – serves Burrendah Boulevard, Pinetree Gully Avenue and South Street
- 998 Fremantle Station to Fremantle Station (limited stops) – CircleRoute clockwise, serves Vahland Avenue, Burrendah Boulevard and Karel Avenue
- 999 Fremantle Station to Fremantle Station (limited stops) – CircleRoute anti-clockwise, serves Karel Avenue, Burrendah Boulevard and Vahland Avenue

Bus routes serving South Street:

- 204 and 205 Murdoch University to Maddington Station
- 206 Murdoch University to Cannington Station
- 207 Murdoch University to Thornlie Station
- 208 Murdoch Station to Cannington Station
- 517 Murdoch TAFE to Thornlie Station
- 518 Murdoch TAFE to Cockburn Central Station
- 519 Murdoch TAFE to Armadale Station

== Politics ==
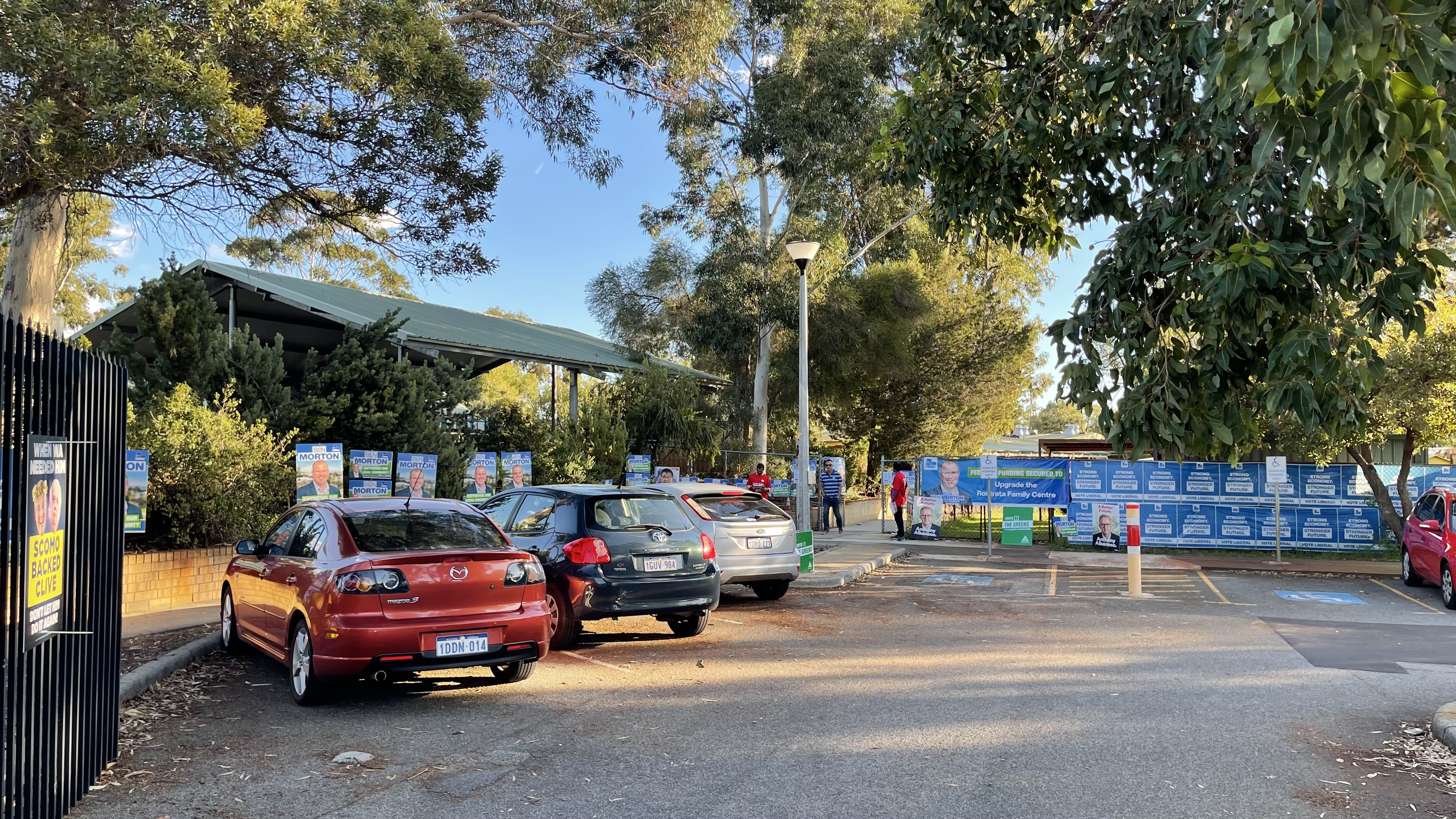
Polling place at Rostrata Primary School for the 2022 Australian federal election

Historically it has been fairly safe for the Liberal Party at both Federal and state elections, although three of the suburb's four booths delivered majorities to the Labor Party at state level in 2001 and 2005. In 2008 it returned a Liberal member to parliament by a very slim majority. By the 2017 state election, despite the Liberal Party winning only 13 of 59 seats, the Liberal Party won all four booths in Willetton. In the 2022 Australian federal election, Labor won First Preference in all six booths in Willetton and Two Candidate Preferred in five of the six booths, in line with an overall nationwide shift to Labor.

The suburb is located within the federal Division of Tangney, the state seat of Riverton and the Beeliar ward of the City of Canning.
