= Bull Creek railway station =

Railway station in Perth, Western Australia

Bull Creek
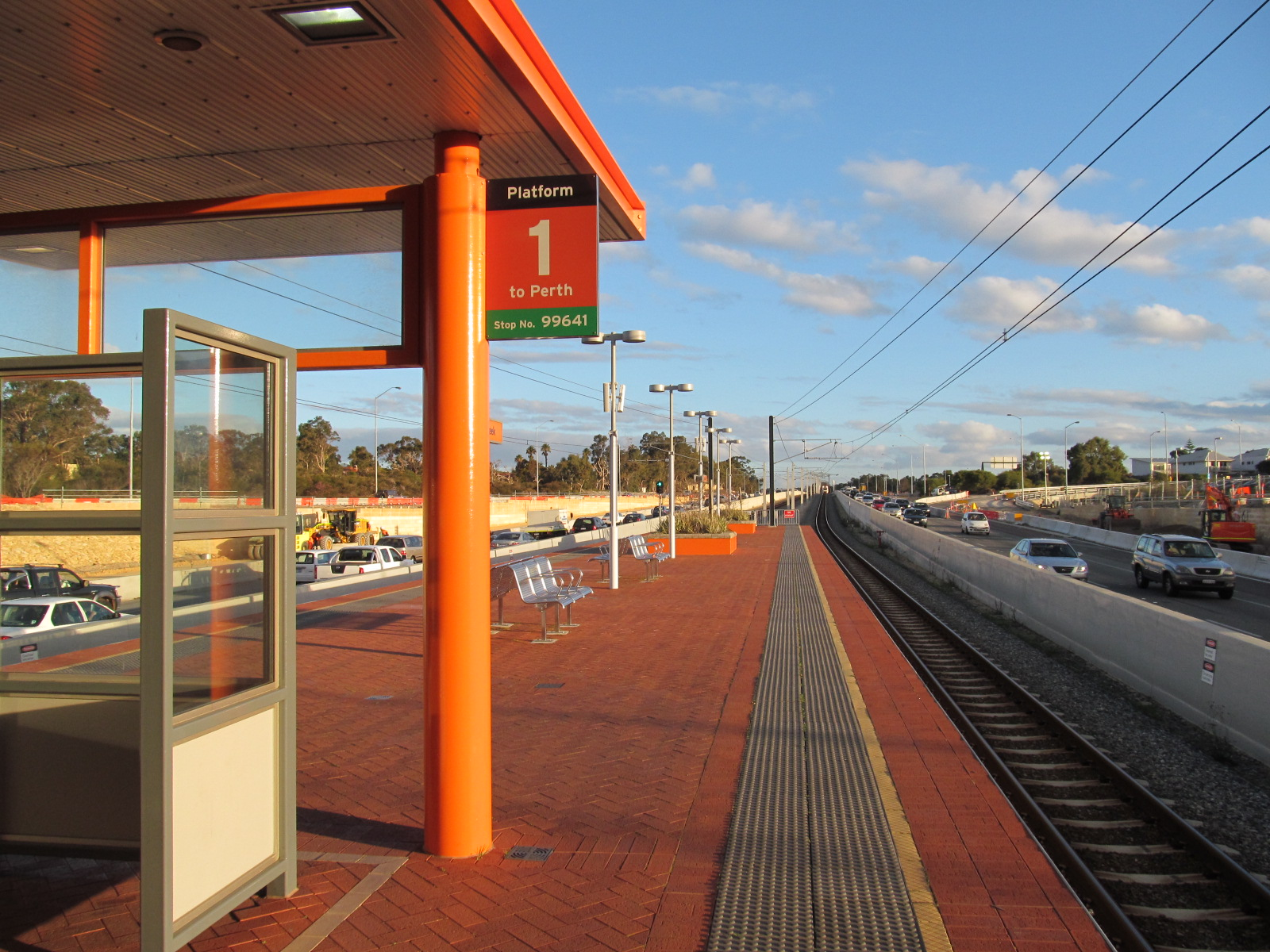
- Northbound view from Platform 1, July 2012

General information
- Location: Kwinana Freeway, Bull Creek; Australia
- Coordinates: 32°02′49″S 115°51′15″E
- Owner: Public Transport Authority
- Operator: Transperth
- Line: Mandurah line
- Distance: 11.7 km (7.3 mi) from Perth
- Platforms: 2 (1 island)
- Tracks: 2
- Bus routes: 12
- Bus stands: 10

Construction
- Structure type: Ground
- Accessible: Yes

Other information
- Fare zone: 2

History
- Opened: 23 December 2007

Passengers
- 2013–14: 1,366,696

Services
Preceding station	Transperth	Following station
Canning Bridge towards Perth Underground	Mandurah line All, W	Murdoch towards Cockburn Central or Mandurah
Location
- Location of Bull Creek railway station

Bull Creek railway station is a railway station on the Transperth network. It is located on the Mandurah line, 11.7 kilometres (7.3 mi) from Perth station inside the median strip of the Kwinana Freeway serving the suburb of Bull Creek.

== History ==
The contract for the construction of Bull Creek railway station, along with Canning Bridge railway station and Murdoch railway station, was awarded to John Holland Pty Ltd in November 2004. This contract was the first contract awarded for the construction of stations on the Southern Suburbs Railway project, and it had a value of A$32 million, equivalent to A$50.4 million in 2022.

During planning, the station was projected to have 3,100 boardings per day upon opening.

Bull Creek railway station is situated in the Kwinana Freeway median strip, with the platforms aligned perpendicular to Leach Highway. It also features integrated bus services on the concourse level; the exterior in front of the concourse operates as a bus station. The station, officially called Bull Creek Station comprising the railway and bus stations, opened along with the rest of the Mandurah line on 23 December 2007.

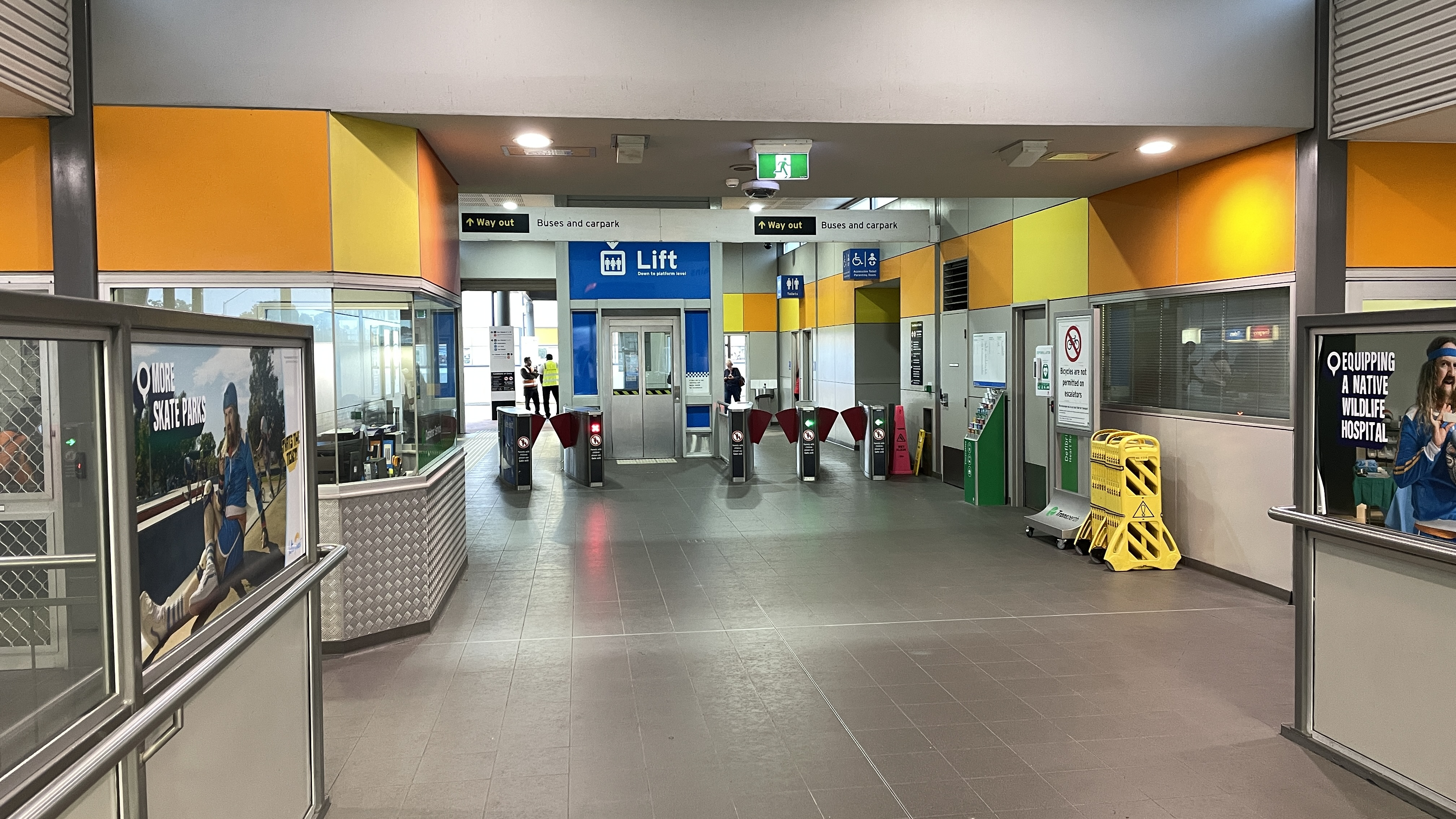
Concourse

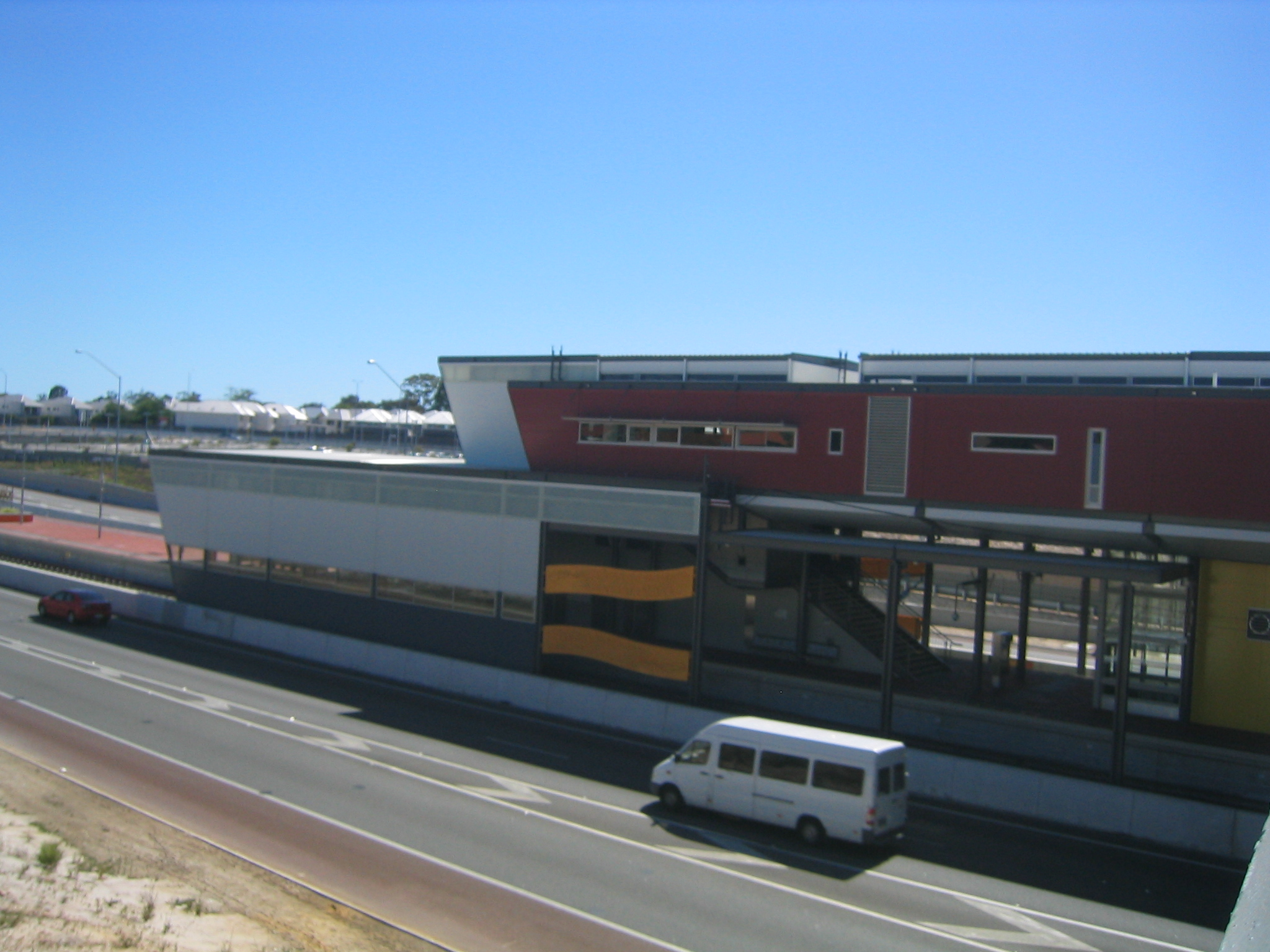
Station building in December 2007

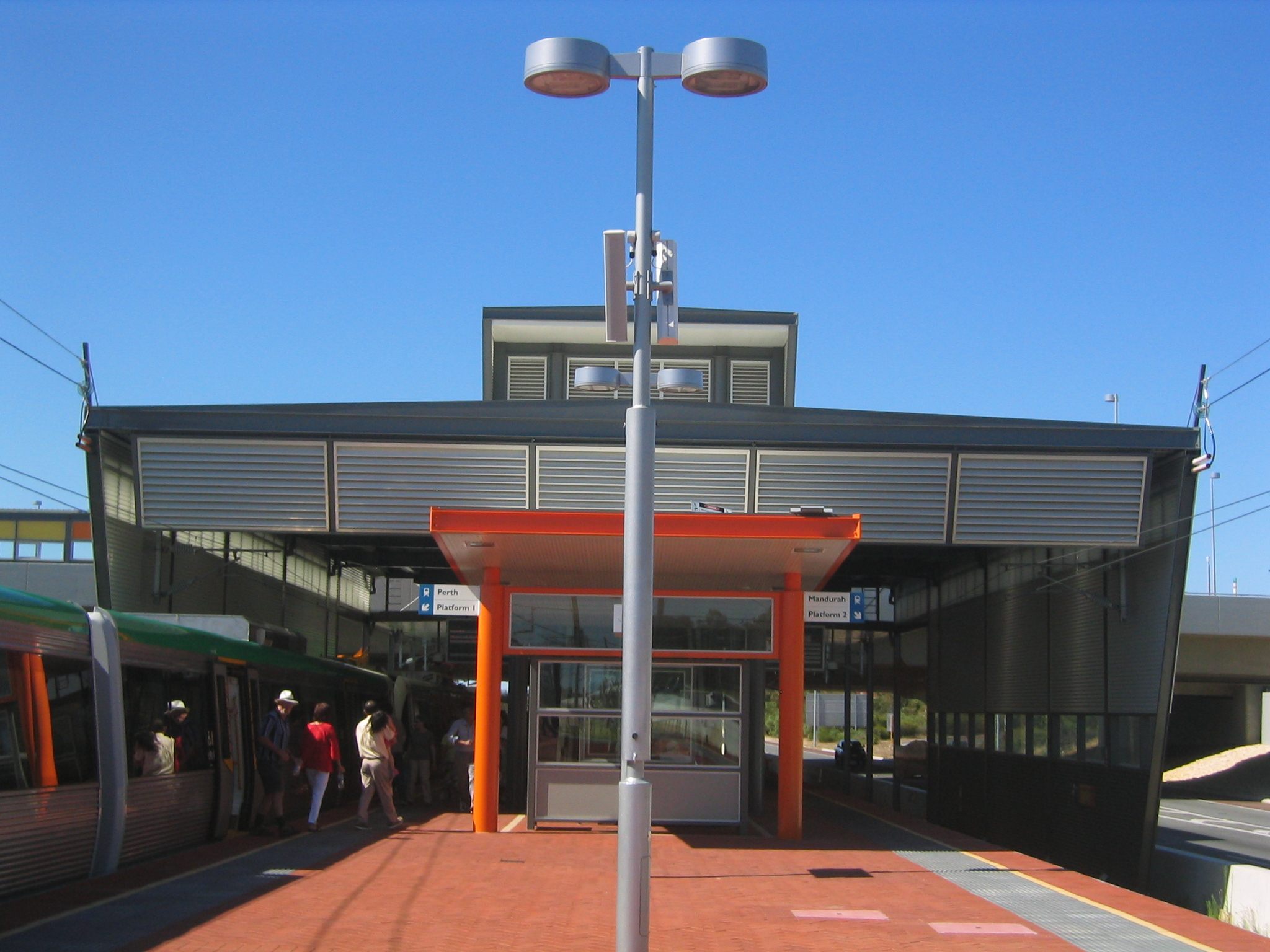
Southbound view in December 2007

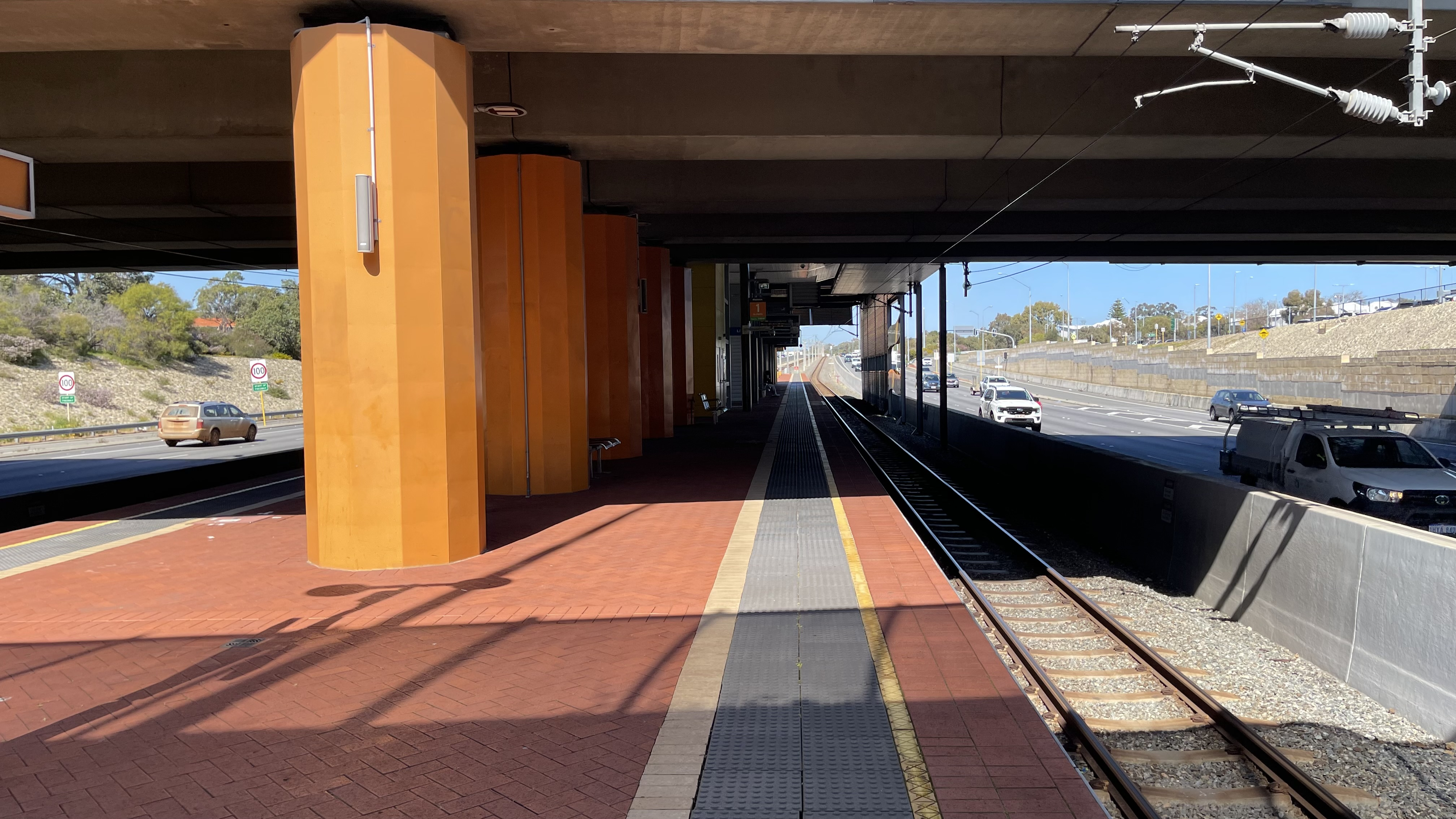
Southbound view of northbound platform from northernmost point in September 2025

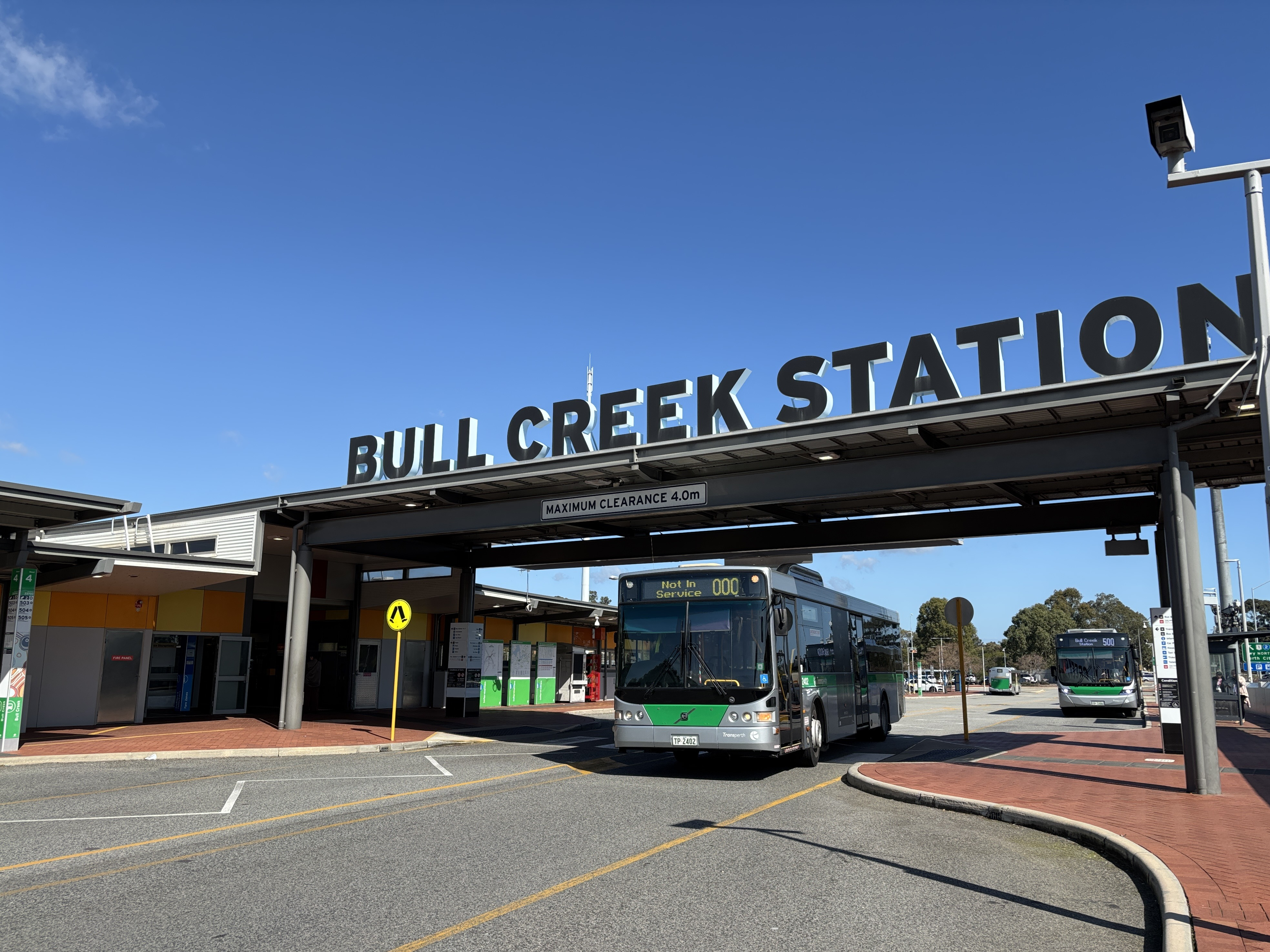
Name of station at entry in September 2025

== Services ==
Bull Creek station is served by Transperth Mandurah line services.

Bull Creek station saw 1,366,696 passengers in the 2013–14 financial year.

=== Platforms ===
Bull Creek platform arrangement
Stop ID	Platform	Line	Service Pattern	Destination	Via	Notes
99641	1	Mandurah line	All stations, W	Perth		
99642	2	Mandurah line	All stations	Mandurah	Murdoch	
99642	2	Mandurah line	W	Cockburn	Murdoch	W pattern runs during weekday peak times only

== Transfers ==
Bus transfers are available in the bus station situated in front of the entrance to the railway concourse. The bus station is on a bridge structure extending over the Kwinana Freeway carriageways and railway platforms. Traffic signals at both ends of the bridge have been modified to include a bus phase.

== Bus routes ==
=== Stands 1–5 ===
Stop	Route	Destination / description	Notes
Stand 1	500	to Booragoon bus station via Brentwood	
Stand 2	915	to Fremantle station via Booragoon bus station & Marmion Street	
Stand 3	502	to Fremantle station via Leach Highway & White Gum Valley	
Stand 4	503	to Murdoch station via Kardinya	
Stand 4	504	to Murdoch station via Jackson Avenue	
Stand 4	505	to Murdoch station via Dean Road	
Stand 5 – Set down	909	Rail replacement service to Mandurah station	

=== Stands 6–10 ===
Stop	Route	Destination / description	Notes
Stand 6	179	to Elizabeth Quay Bus Station via High Road, Riverton, Wilson, St James & Victoria Park	
Stand 6	509	to Cannington station via High Road, Riverton & Wilson	
Stand 7	508	to Cannington station via Apsley Road, High Road & Ferndale	
Stand 8	506	to Parkwood via Southlands Boulevarde	
Stand 8	507	to Cannington station via Southlands Boulevarde, Willetton, Parkwood & Lynwood	
Stand 9	178	to Elizabeth Quay Bus Station via Rossmoyne, Shelley, Wilson, St James & Victoria Park	
Stand 10 – Set down	909	Rail replacement service to Perth station	
