= Langford, Western Australia =

Langford
- Suburb
- Interactive map of Langford
- Coordinates: 32°02′28″S 115°56′29″E
- Country: Australia
- State: Western Australia
- City: Perth
- LGA: City of Gosnells
- Established: 1967

Government
  - State electorate: Cannington
  - Federal division: Burt

Population
  - Total: 5,505 (SAL 2021)
- Postcode: 6147
Suburbs around Langford
Ferndale	Cannington	Beckenham
Lynwood	Langford	Kenwick
Parkwood	Thornlie	Thornlie

Langford is a suburb of Perth, Western Australia, located within the City of Gosnells. Its postcode is 6147.

== History ==
Langford was named after William Henry Langford, a long-serving local councillor and chairman of the Gosnells Road Board. The Shire of Gosnells submitted the name in September 1966, having chosen it in consultation with the State Housing Commission. The name was approved in January 1967. It is a working-class residential suburb located approximately 11 km (7 mi) from Perth's central business district. Langford has historically had social problems. Originally established as public housing, much has now been redeveloped or renovated and sold to private owners.

Langford Village Shopping Centre

Langford is served by the major arterial roads Roe Highway and Albany Highway; schools including Brookman Primary School, St Judes Catholic School, and Langford Islamic College; several churches; a sporting complex; and the Langford Village Shopping Centre, which includes restaurants, tavern, delicatessen and pharmacy.

== Transport ==
=== Bus ===
- 202 and 203 Cannington Station to Bull Creek Station – serve Nicholson Road
- 207 Cannington Station to Murdoch University – serves Nicholson Road
- 208 Cannington Station to Murdoch University – serves View Avenue, Brookman Avenue, and Langford Avenue
- 925 Cannington Station to Bull Creek Station (high frequency) - serves Nicholson Road
- 930 Thornlie Station to Elizabeth Quay Bus Station (high frequency) – serves Spencer Road
- 930X Thornlie Station to Elizabeth Quay Bus Station (limited stops) – serves Spencer Road
