= Shelley, Western Australia =

Shelley
- Suburb
- Interactive map of Shelley
- Coordinates: 32°01′47″S 115°53′12″E
- Country: Australia
- State: Western Australia
- City: Perth
- LGA: City of Canning
- Location: 14 km (8.7 mi) from Perth

Government
  - State electorate: Riverton
  - Federal division: Tangney

Population
  - Total: 4,795 (SAL 2021)
- Postcode: 6148
Suburbs around Shelley
Salter Point	Waterford	Wilson
Rossmoyne	Shelley	Wilson
Bull Creek	Willetton	Riverton

Shelley is a suburb of Perth, Western Australia, located within the City of Canning.

== History ==
The suburb was part of Riverton until the mid-1960s; its name is believed to refer to shells found in the area on the shores of the Canning River.

== Boundary ==
The suburb's northern foreshore is bound by Canning River. In the east, the borders starts from Riverton Drive East, Barbican Street East, Tudor Avenue South, Tribute Street, Modillion Avenue, Corinthian Road East.

A stretch of Leach Highway forms the south western border of the suburb until it goes up to Fifth Avenue and zigzags up back to Riverton Drive North.

== Education ==
Shelley has one primary school located within its borders, Shelley Primary School which is off Monota Avenue. Shelley is located within the Rossmoyne Senior High School zone and is close to Curtin University.

== Shopping ==
Shelley contains a neighbourhood shopping centre called Shelley Hub, on Tribute Street West.

== Transport ==
Shelley residents have access to major bus routes. Off Leach Highway the 998 and 999 CircleRoute buses travel to Fremantle and to Curtin University in the opposite direction respectively. Another bus service which Shelley residents have access to is the 178, which travels from Bull Creek Station to Elizabeth Quay Bus Station.

=== Bus ===
- 178 Bull Creek Station to Elizabeth Quay Bus Station – serves Fifth Avenue, Corinthian Road, Beatrice Avenue, Tribute Street, Modillion Avenue and Corbel Street
- 998 Fremantle Station to Fremantle Station (limited stops) – CircleRoute clockwise, serves Leach Highway
- 999 Fremantle Station to Fremantle Station (limited stops) – CircleRoute anti-clockwise, serves Leach Highway

Bus routes serving Barbican Street East:

- 75 Canning Vale to Elizabeth Quay Bus Station
- 179 Bull Creek Station to Elizabeth Quay Bus Station
- 509 Bull Creek Station to Cannington Station
