= Harrisdale, Western Australia =

Harrisdale
- Suburb
- Interactive map of Harrisdale
- Coordinates: 32.112°S 115.932°E
- Country: Australia
- State: Western Australia
- City: Perth
- LGA: City of Armadale
- Established: 2007

Government
  - State electorate: Oakford
  - Federal division: Burt

Area
  - Total: 5.8 km^{2} (2.2 sq mi)

Population
  - Total: 11,667 (SAL 2021)
- Postcode: 6112
Suburbs around Harrisdale
Canning Vale	Canning Vale	Canning Vale
Canning Vale	Harrisdale	Southern River
Piara Waters	Piara Waters	Forrestdale

Harrisdale is a southeastern suburb of Perth, Western Australia and is one of the western suburbs of the City of Armadale. It was gazetted in 2007, and has a population of 9,076 as of the 2016 Australian census. The population of the developing area is expected to grow to over 10,000 by 2031.

On 12 April 2008, a joint venture was announced between the Government of Western Australia and Cedar Woods Properties Limited to develop a 30-hectare (74-acre) site in the northwest of the suburb of Harrisdale with an emphasis on affordable housing and sustainable living. The development, known as Harrisdale Green, commenced construction in July 2010 and will accommodate up to 500 homes.

The suburb is bounded by Warton Road to the northwest, Ranford Road to the northeast, Skeet Road to the southeast and Nicholson Road to the southwest.

Carey Baptist College is a co-educational school that occupies a 12-hectare (30-acre) site in Harrisdale. It was established by the Carey Community Baptist Church in 1998 and provides education from kindergarten through to Year 12.

Harrisdale Senior High School is a public high school in Harrisdale that opened in 2017.

The Harrisdale Swamp Bushland occupies a significant portion of the suburb's west. It is a banksia woodland dominated by Banksia attenuata and Banksia menziesii. The mammal species Quenda occurs in this area.

== Transport ==
=== Bus ===
- 233 Cockburn Central Station to Gosnells Station – serves Nicholson Road, Yellowwood Avenue and Gracefield Boulevard
- 518 Cockburn Central Station to Murdoch TAFE – serves Wright Road and Ranford Road
- 519 Armadale Station to Murdoch TAFE – serves Nicholson Road
