= Parkwood, Western Australia =

Parkwood
- Suburb
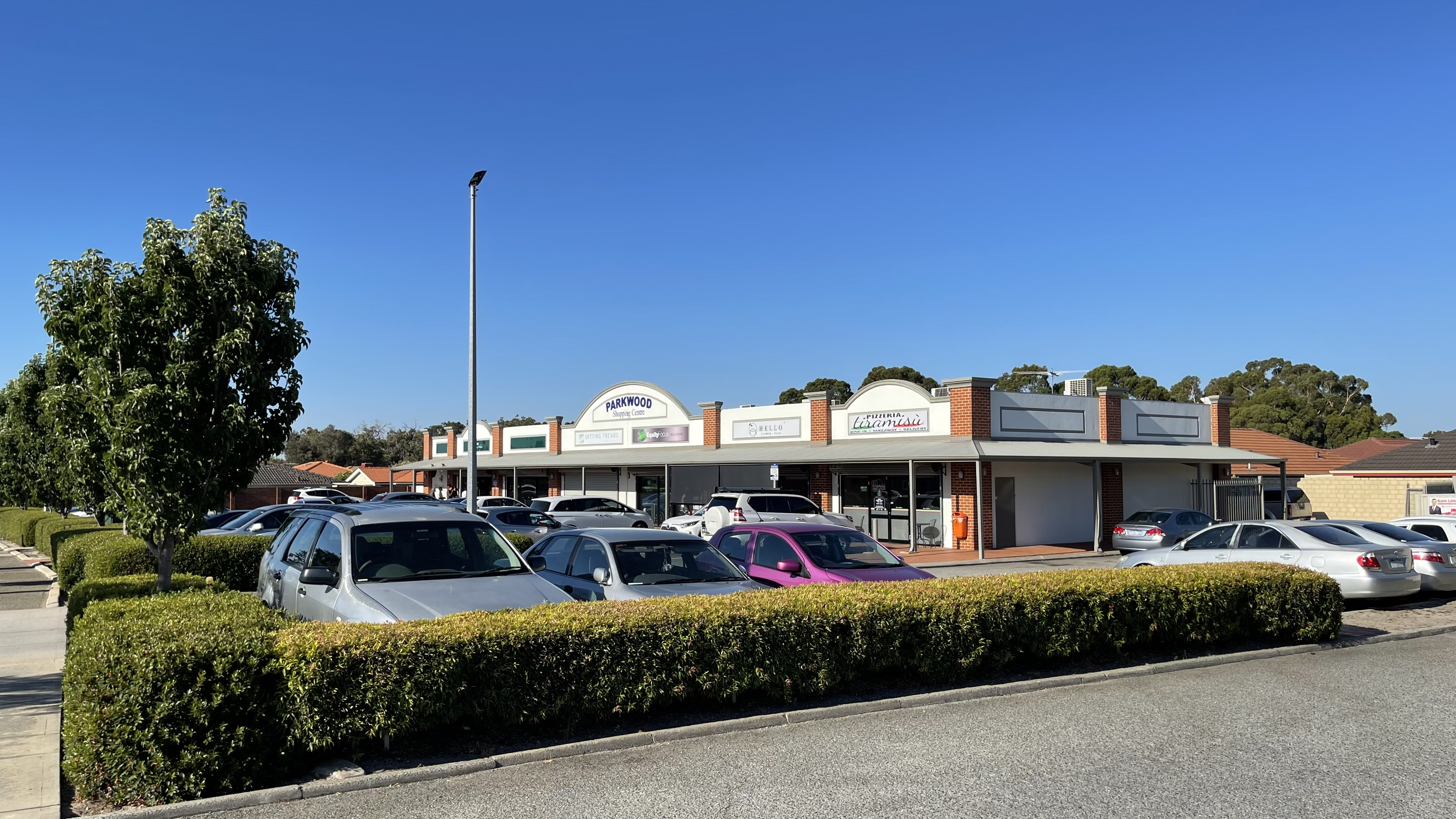
- Parkwood Shopping Centre at Vellgrove Avenue.
- Interactive map of Parkwood
- Coordinates: 32°02′52″S 115°54′54″E
- Country: Australia
- State: Western Australia
- City: Perth
- LGA: City of Canning
- Location: 14.8 km (9.2 mi) from the Perth CBD
- Established: 1965

Government
  - State electorate: Riverton
  - Federal division: Tangney

Area
  - Total: 3.6 km^{2} (1.4 sq mi)

Population
  - Total: 5,995 (SAL 2021)
- Postcode: 6147
Suburbs around Parkwood
Riverton	Ferndale	Lynwood
Willetton	Parkwood	Langford
Willetton	Canning Vale	Thornlie

Parkwood is a southeastern suburb of Perth, the capital city of Western Australia. Its local government area is the City of Canning.

== History ==
Parkwood was first settled by Henry Willett of Willett & Co, who was granted Canning Location 21 on the Canning River (which included nearby Lynwood) and settled in the area in June 1832. In November 1964, the Shire of Canning proposed the names Burtsdale and Willetton for Willetton and Lynwood/Parkwood respectively, the name Burtsdale honouring Septimus Burt, who purchased the land in 1882. In August 1965, developers at Lynwood requested the name Clovercrest Estate, but finally agreed to Lynwood. The name Willetton was shifted westwards and Lynwood was gazetted in December 1965.

Parkwood became its own suburb in 1993, and Lynwood still exists north of High Road.

== Geography ==
Parkwood is bounded by High Road to the north and northeast, Nicholson Road to the east, Roe Highway to the south and Willeri Drive to the west.

== Facilities ==
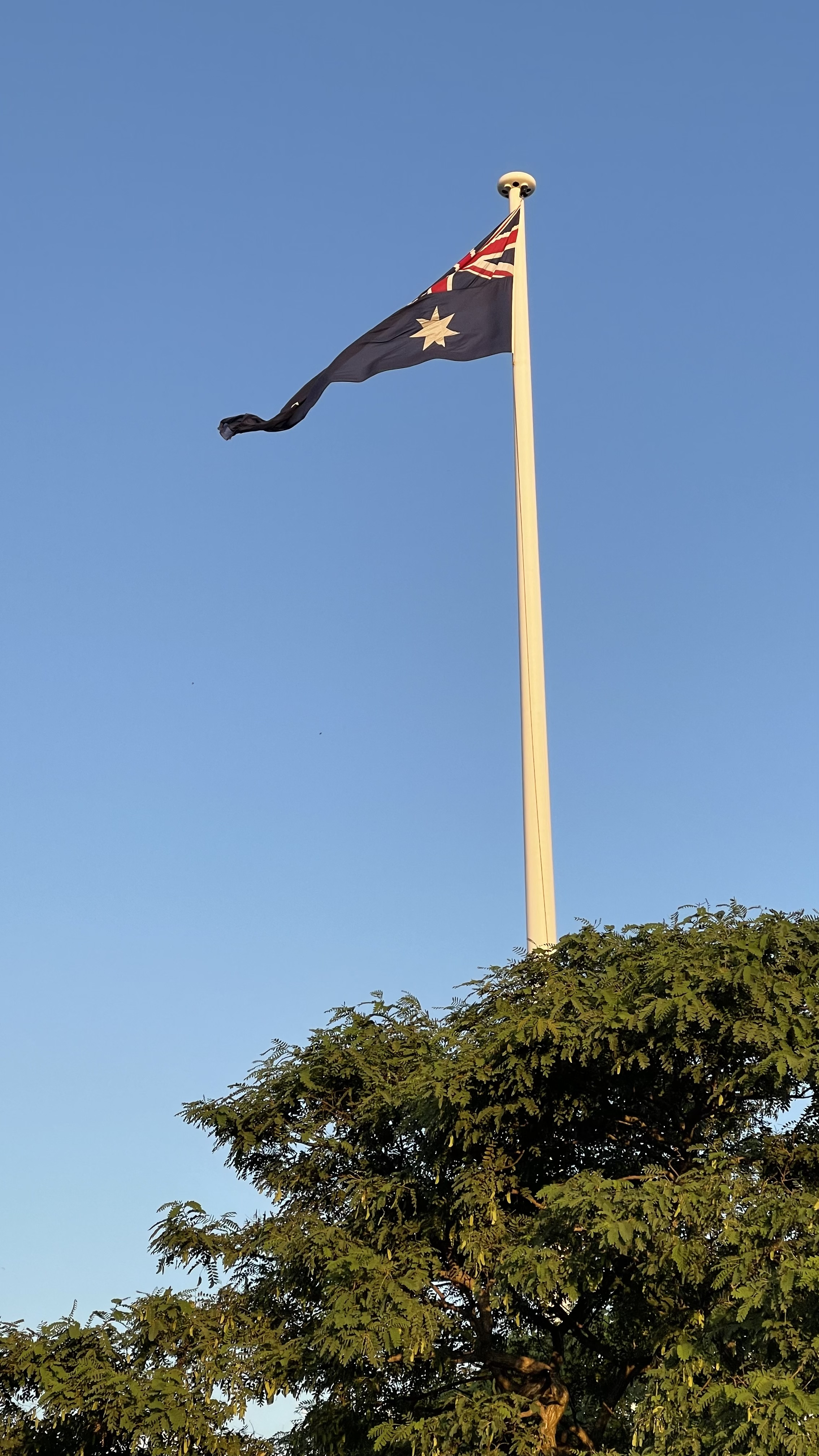
Flag at Stockland Riverton Shopping Centre in Parkwood that is visible from surrounding suburbs.

Parkwood is a residential suburb with a scattering of parks of varying sizes. It contains Lynwood Senior High School (1974) and Parkwood Primary School (1975, originally called West Lynwood), which contains one of Perth's seven primary-school-level Intensive English Centres. The program is designed to assist refugees, displaced children and others with low English literacy, many of whom have special needs.

Riverton Forum Shopping Centre (previously Stockland Riverton), opened in 1986 as Riverton Forum and was acquired by Stockland in the mid-late 2000s but was handed to Elanor in 2023 and is situated in Parkwood on the southern side of High Road, is near the Canning Arts Centre and the Riverton Leisureplex that are both situated in Riverton on the northern side of High Road. The Riverton Leisureplex is a large facility with sporting, fitness and recreation facilities first opened on 9 November 2001. It is operated by the City of Canning and includes the council's largest library. The building was designed by the architectural firm James Christou and Partners.

Whaleback Golf Course

The southeast is served by a neighbourhood shopping centre on Vellgrove Avenue and a community and sports centre, which back onto Whaleback Golf Course, an 18-hole public golf course. The facility first opened on 9 January 1981 on a buffer reserve between the Canning Vale industrial area and the housing developments in Parkwood and Lynwood, and was significantly upgraded in December 2002.

== Transport ==
=== Bus ===
- 73 Ranford Road Station to Elizabeth Quay Bus Station – serves Willeri Drive
- 201 Bull Creek Station to Nicholson Road Station - serves High Road
- 202 Bull Creek Station to Cannington Station – serves High Road
- 203 Bull Creek Station to Cannington Station – serves Vellgrove Avenue
- 925 Bull Creek Station to Cannington Station (high frequency) – serves Hossack Avenue and Metcalfe Road
