= Murdoch railway station =

Railway station in Perth, Western Australia

Murdoch
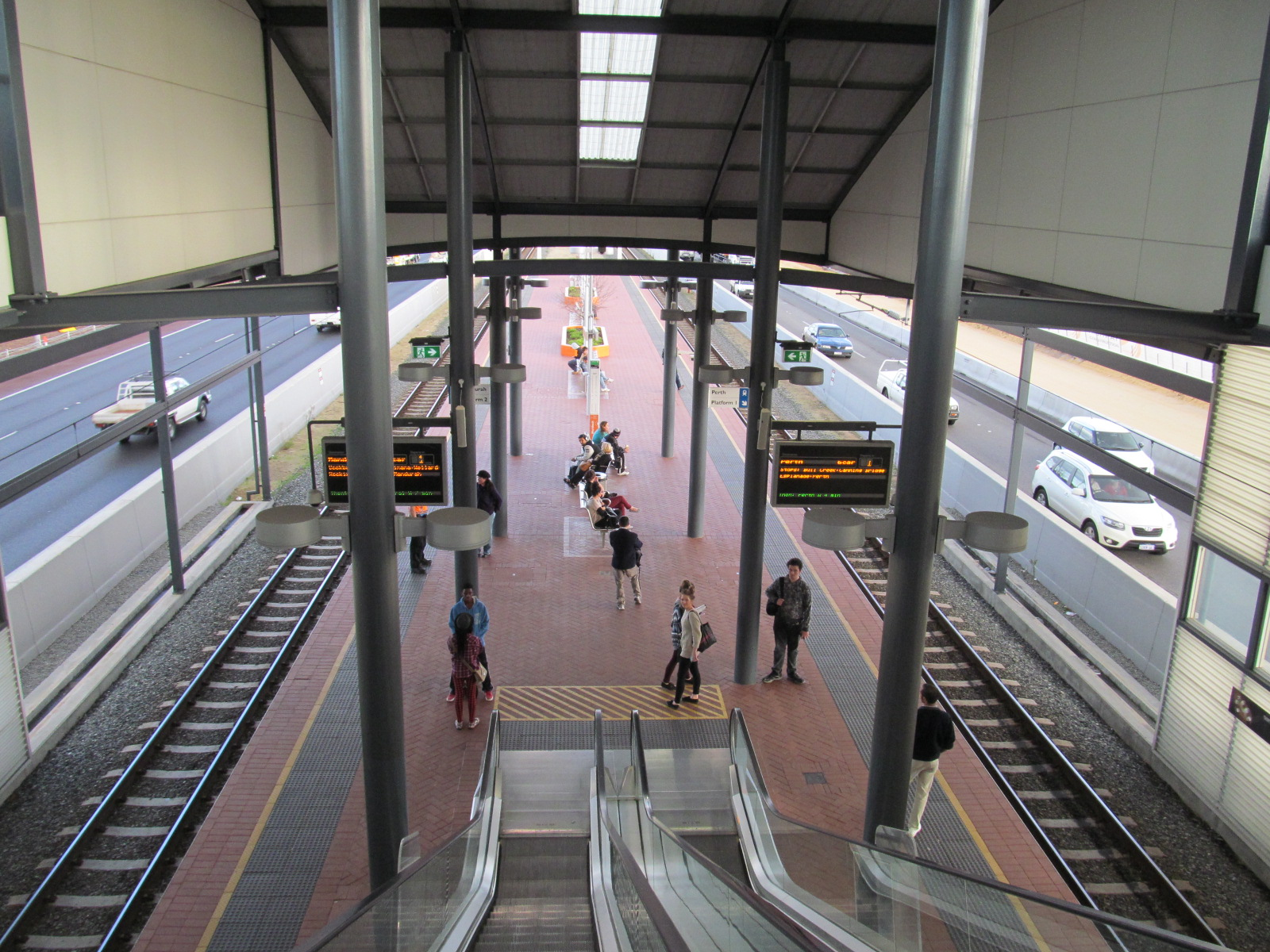
- Southbound view of the station platforms, viewed from the escalators leading from the concourse, July 2012

General information
- Location: Kwinana Freeway, Murdoch; Australia
- Coordinates: 32°03′58″S 115°51′02″E
- Owner: Public Transport Authority
- Operator: Transperth
- Line: Mandurah line
- Distance: 13.8 kilometres from Perth
- Platforms: 2 (1 island)
- Tracks: 2
- Bus routes: 20
- Bus stands: 12

Construction
- Structure type: Ground
- Accessible: Yes

Other information
- Fare zone: 2

History
- Opened: 23 December 2007

Passengers
- 2017: 7,969 daily

Services
Preceding station	Transperth	Following station
Bull Creek towards Perth Underground	Mandurah line All	Cockburn Central towards Mandurah
Bull Creek towards Perth Underground	Mandurah line W	Cockburn Central Terminus
Location
- Location of Murdoch railway station

Murdoch railway station is a railway and bus station on the Transperth network. It is located on the Mandurah line, 13.8 kilometres (8.6 mi) from Perth station inside the median strip of the Kwinana Freeway serving the suburb of Murdoch.

== History ==
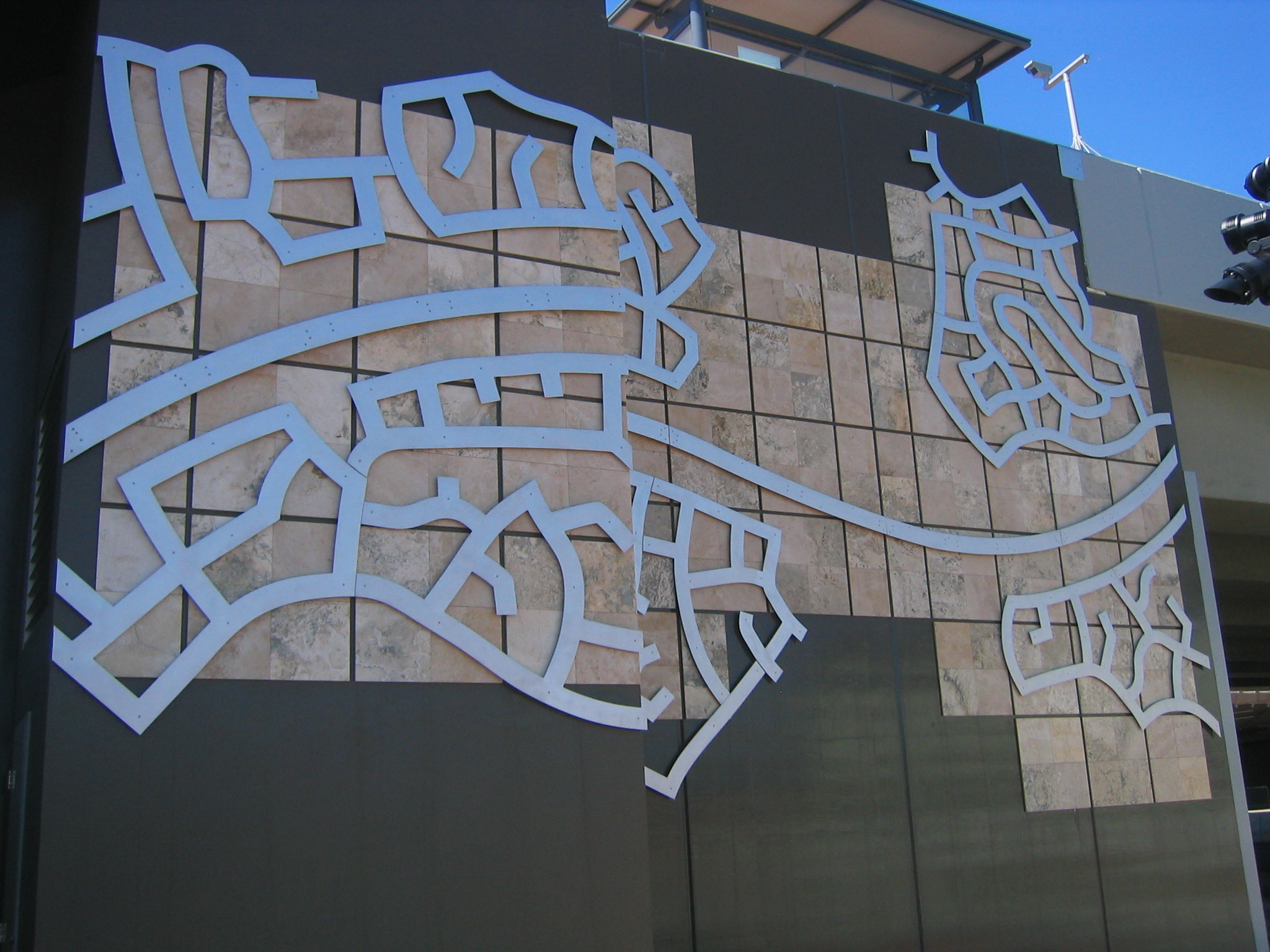
Art work from the south-west carpark in December 2007

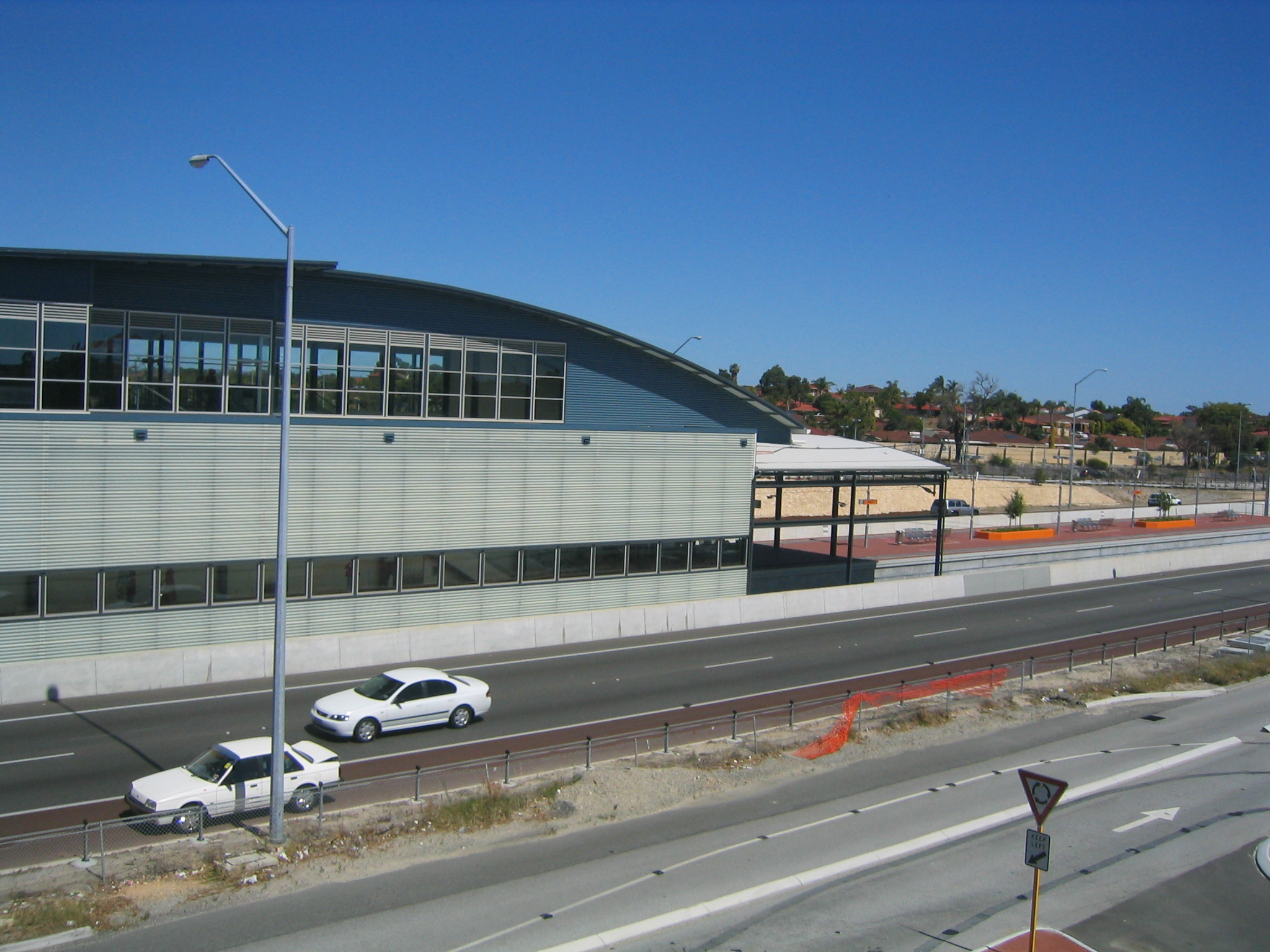
Northbound view of station building from the Kwinana Freeway in December 2007

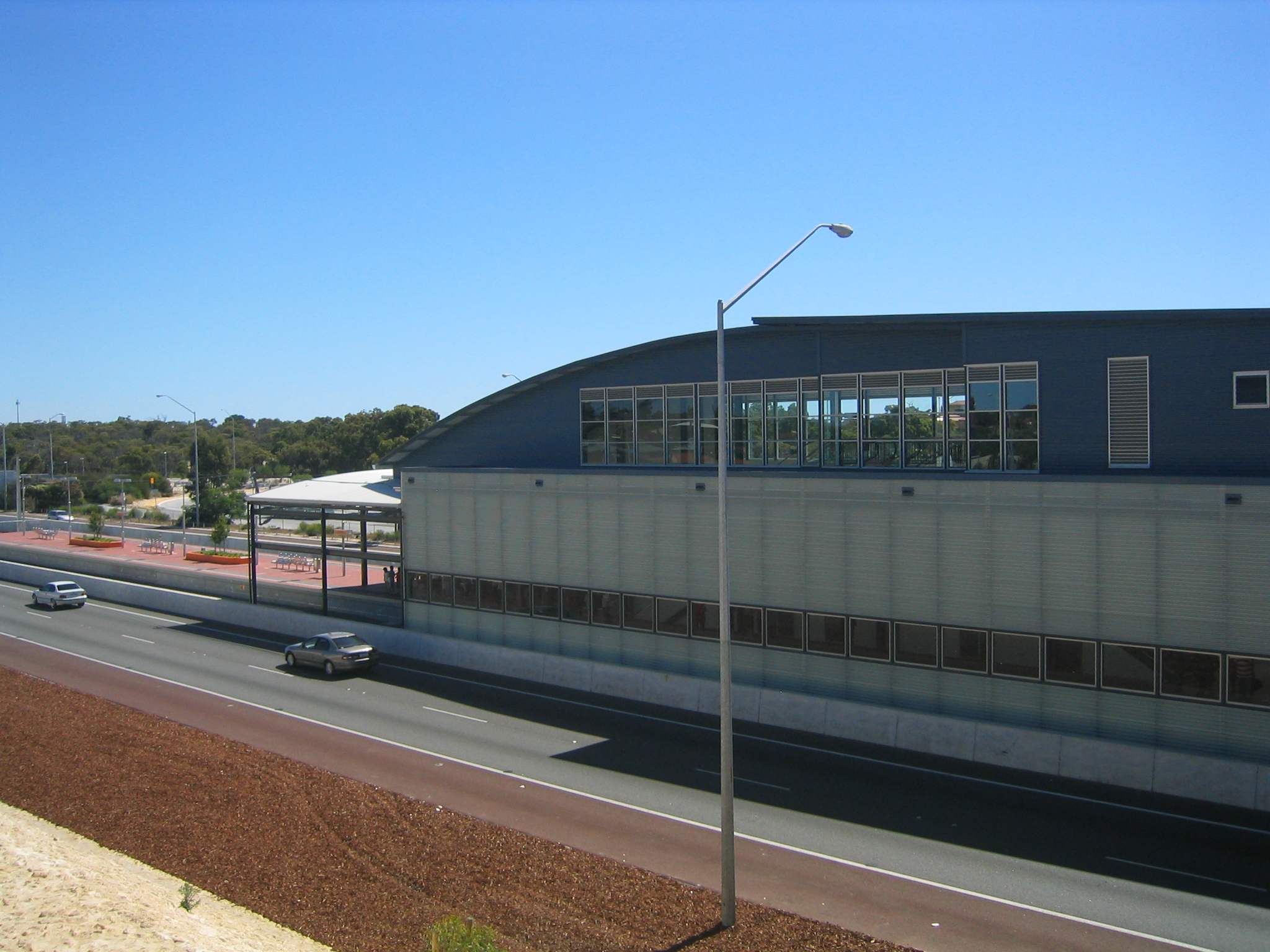
Southbound view of station from Kwinana Freeway in December 2007

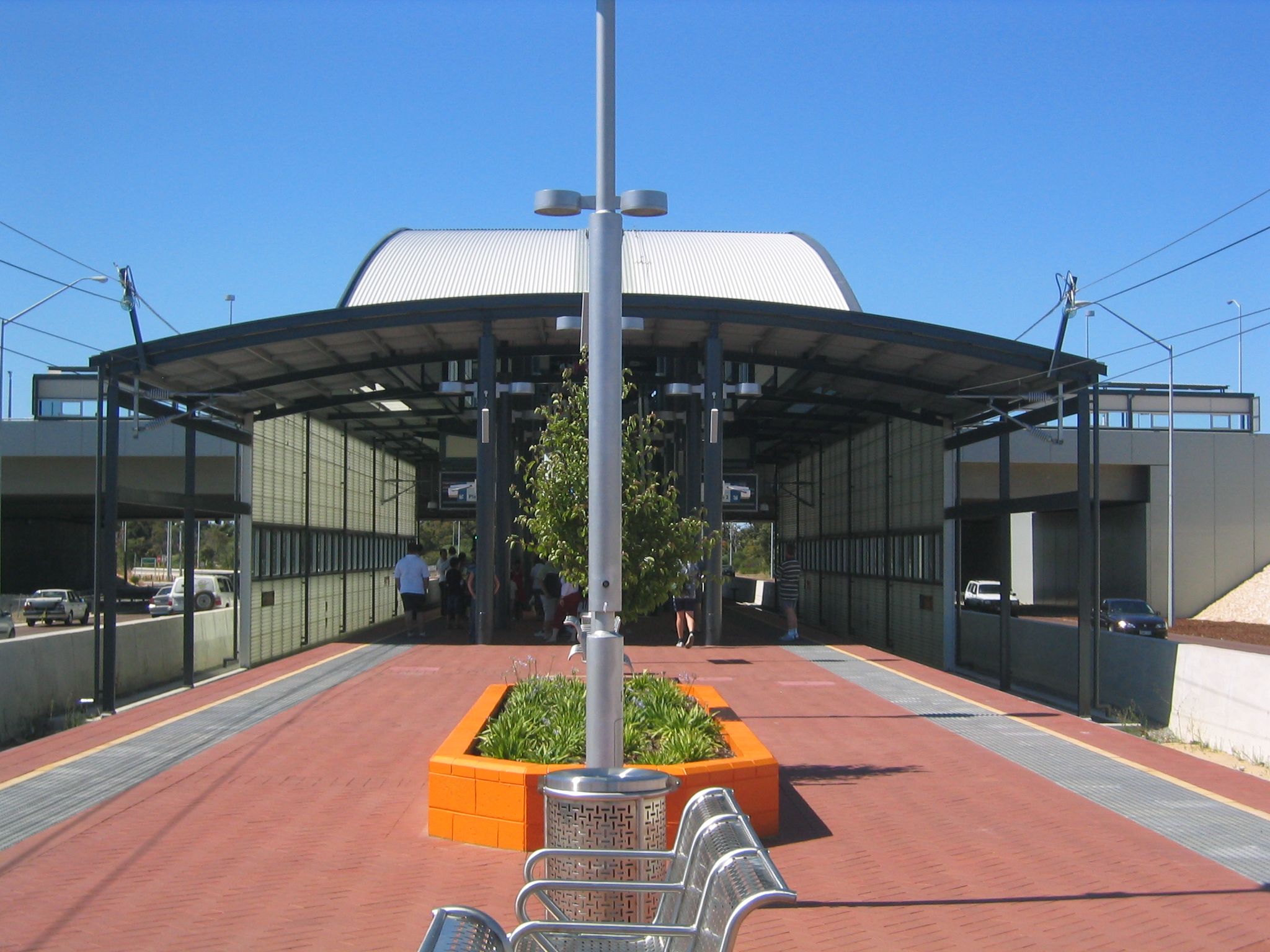
Southbound view in December 2007

=== Early history as a bus station ===
Murdoch Park 'n' Ride was a Transperth bus station located in Murdoch, Western Australia. It opened on 14 December 1994 with parking for 583 cars.

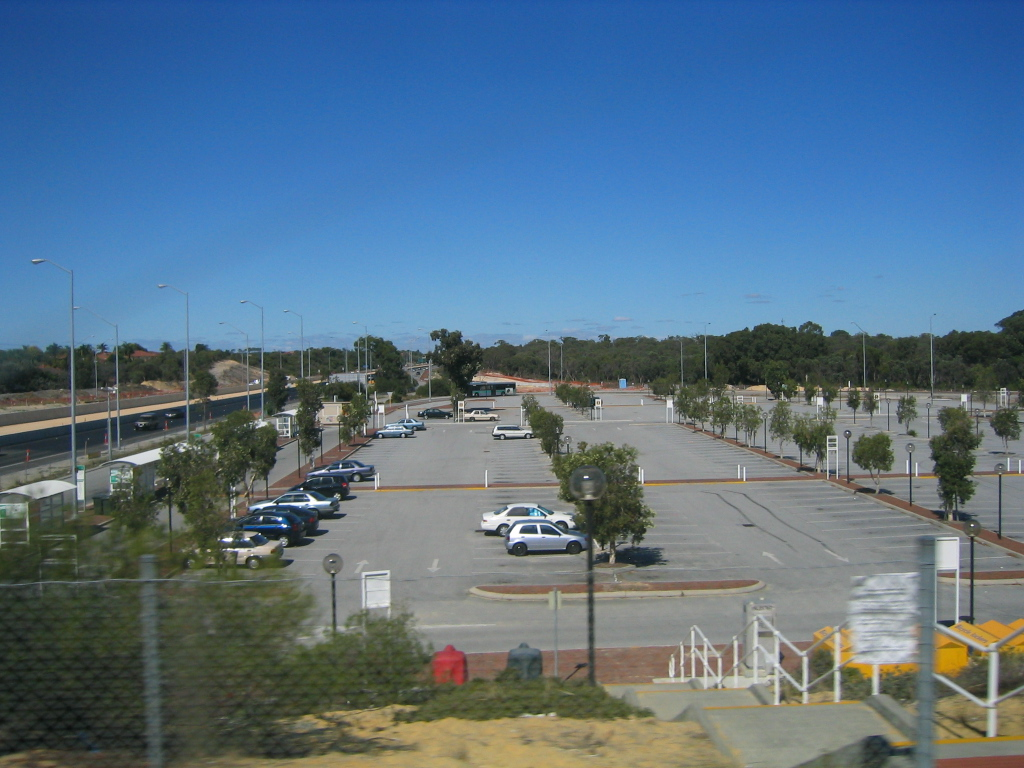
Transperth Murdoch Park 'n' Ride In April 2005.

The Murdoch Park 'n' Ride's car park was expanded along with other upgrades which occurred in 2001.

On 31 January 2007 it closed to facilitate the construction of Murdoch railway station, which incorporated a bus facility on a bridge structure extending over the Kwinana Freeway carriageways and train station. The Park & Ride no longer exists and instead its function was incoporated into the current Murdoch railway station.

=== Conversion to train station ===
Murdoch railway station was designed to subsume the existing Murdoch Park 'n' Ride. With Murdoch railway station operating as a fully integrated bus/train interchange. This involved the construction of purpose-built bus way interchange bridge that runs parallel to the South Street overpass.

The contract for the construction of Murdoch railway station, along with Bull Creek railway station and Canning Bridge railway station, was awarded to John Holland Pty Ltd in November 2004. This contract was the first contract awarded for the construction of stations on the Southern Suburbs Railway project, and it had a value of $32 million.

During planning, the station was projected to have 4,980 boardings per day upon opening.

Murdoch Station opened along with the rest of the Mandurah line on 23 December 2007.

=== Post opening ===
In 2017, Murdoch was named the busiest station utilised on the line as well as the third busiest on the Transperth network overall with extremely high patronage. As of January 2009, 57 percent of passengers at Murdoch station catch the bus to get to the station. As of early 2025 the federal government announced $5m in funding for planning major upgrades to Murdoch station which includes concept designs for new parking and bus facilities, as well as improving pedestrian access to the station.

== Services ==
=== Train services ===
Murdoch Station is served by Transperth Mandurah line services. This station is served by both All stops and W pattern train services on the Mandurah line. Train services at Murdoch station arrive every 5 minutes during weekday peak, reducing to every 10 minutes outside of peak. At night and during weekends service frequencies operate every 15 to 30 minutes.

==== Platforms ====
Murdoch platform arrangement
Stop ID	Platform	Line	Service Pattern	Destination	Via	Notes
99651	1	Mandurah line	All stations, W	Perth		
99652	2	Mandurah line	All stations	Mandurah	Murdoch	
99652	2	Mandurah line	W	Cockburn	Murdoch	

=== Bus services ===
Bus transfers are available on the concourse level. The bus station is situated on a bridge structure extending over the Kwinana Freeway and railway station. Traffic signals at both ends of the bridge include a bus phase.

==== Stands 1–6 ====
Stop	Route	Destination / description	Notes
Stand 1	510	to Booragoon bus station via Murdoch Drive	
Stand 1	511	to Fremantle station via Winterfold Road	
Stand 2	512	to Spearwood via Coolbellup	
Stand 2	513	to Fremantle station via Samson	
Stand 3	503	to Bull Creek station via Winthrop Drive	
Stand 3	504	to Bull Creek station via Jackson Avenue	
Stand 3	505	to Bull Creek station via Dean Road	
Stand 4	998	Clockwise to Fremantle station via Kardinya	Limited stops circle route
Stand 5	204, 205, 206, 207	to Murdoch University	
Stand 6 – Set down	909	Rail replacement service to Perth station	

==== Stands 7–12 ====
Stop	Route	Destination / description	Notes
Stand 7	208	to Cannington station via Bannister Road & Nicholson Road	
Stand 7	517	to Thornlie station via Furley Road, Balfour Street & Spencer Road	
Stand 7	518	to Cockburn Central station via Wright Road, Harrisdale & Piara Waters	
Stand 7	519	to Armadale station via Southacre Drive, Nicholson Road & Armadale Road	
Stand 8	204	to Maddington station via Warton Road	
Stand 8	205	to Maddington station via Bridge Road	
Stand 9	206	to Cannington station via Fraser Road North	
Stand 9	207	to Thornlie station via Nicholson Road & Yale Road	
Stand 10	999	Anti-clockwise to Galleria Bus Station via Southlands Boulevarde & Curtin University bus station	Limited stops circle route
Stand 11	514	to Cockburn Central station via Bibra Drive	
Stand 11	515	to Jandakot via Berrigan Drive	
Stand 11	516	to Southlands Boulevarde via Leeming	
Stand 12 – Set down	909	Rail replacement service to Mandurah station	
