= Riverton, Western Australia =

Riverton Perth, Western Australia
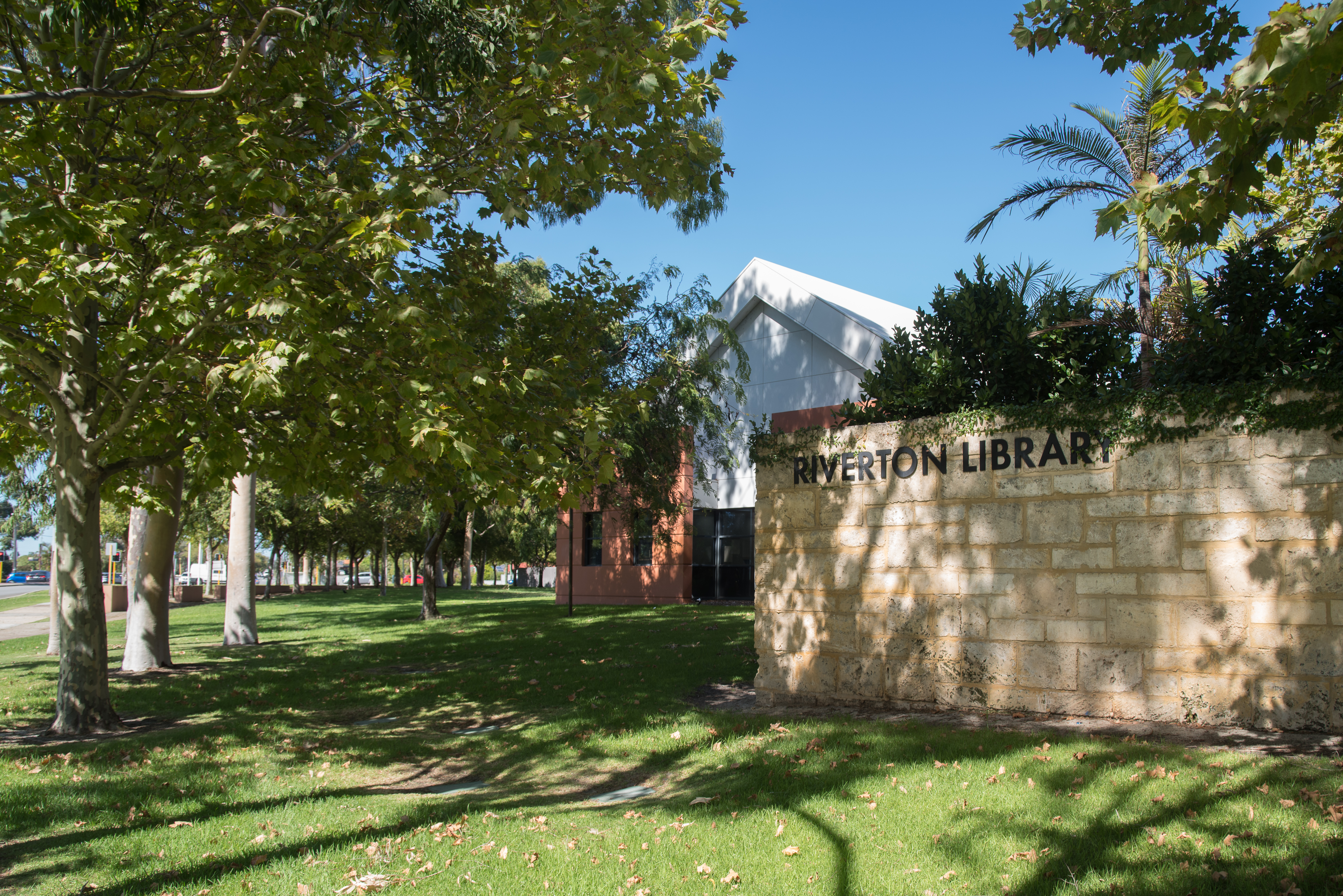
- Riverton Library
- Coordinates: 32°02′05″S 115°53′56″E
- Population: 6,078 (SAL 2021)
- Postcode(s): 6148
- Location: 14 km (9 mi) from Perth
- LGA(s): Canning
- State electorate(s): Riverton
- Federal division(s): Tangney, Swan
Suburbs around Riverton:
| Shelley | Shelley / Wilson | Wilson |
| Willetton | Riverton | Ferndale |
| Willetton | Canning Vale | Parkwood |

Riverton is a southeastern suburb of Perth, the capital city of Western Australia. Its local government area is the City of Canning.

== Location ==
Riverton is situated about 14 km (8.7 mi) from Perth. The Canning River forms some of its north eastern boundary. It is part of the City of Canning, situated south east of the Swan River. The main roads that pass through Riverton are Leach Highway, High Road and Vahland Avenue.

== History ==
The suburb began by a subdivision in 1917. It was referred to locally as Riverton Bridge in 1937 due to the old timber Riverton Bridge that crosses the Canning River to the suburb, and to distinguish it from the South Australian suburb of Riverton.

== Amenities ==
Riverton has its local library with recreational facilities known as the Riverton Leisureplex. Situated in adjoining Parkwood is Riverton Forum, often referred to by its former name of Stockland, which provides locals with everyday essentials.

There are two primary schools: the independent public school Riverton Primary School, and the private Catholic school Queen of Apostles. The suburb has no secondary schools and is in the intake area of both Lynwood Senior High School in Parkwood and Rossmoyne Senior High School in Bull Creek.

=== Adenia Road Park ===
Adenia Road Park forms part of the Canning River Regional Park. It includes the Canning River, Adenia Park Lagoon, natural bush walk paths, dog exercise area, bike path, lookouts and a playground. It links between the Canning River Regional Park in Ferndale and the parkland beside Riverton Bridge.

=== Clune Park ===
Clune Park is an area located in Riverton, managed by the City of Canning. In 1928, the Christian Brothers purchased 62.4 hectares (160 acres) of land just east of the Riverton Bridge naming it Clune Park. Clune Park is named after the Catholic Archbishop Patrick Clune.

=== Montes Square ===
Montes Square is a smaller park in Riverton, quite close to the primary school. Its perimeter is about 500 metres (1,600 ft), making it a good place for dogs and their owners to exercise and for many different types of sports, excluding golf, which is banned.

=== Riverton Primary School ===
The area is well served by a primary school. It has a large oval with a perimeter of about 600 metres (2,000 ft) for sports activity.

=== Location ===
Riverton is situated about a twenty-minute drive away from Perth city and a ten-minute drive away from Bull Creek railway station. Riverton is a quiet suburb, with low rates of crime and violence, due to the fact that a large portion of the residents are either retired or elderly, although this is changing, with young families moving in more frequently.

== Transport ==
=== Bus ===
- 75 Canning Vale to Elizabeth Quay Bus Station – serves Riley Road, Riverton Drive, Tribute Street, Marjorie Avenue and Barbican Street
- 179 Bull Creek Station to Elizabeth Quay Bus Station – serves High Road, Riley Road, Riverton Drive, Tribute Street, Marjorie Avenue and Barbican Street
- 508 Bull Creek Station to Cannington Station – serves High Road
- 509 Bull Creek Station to Cannington Station – serves High Road, Riley Road, Riverton Drive, Tribute Street, Marjorie Avenue and Barbican Street
- 998 Fremantle Station to Fremantle Station (limited stops) – CircleRoute clockwise, serves Vahland Avenue
- 999 Fremantle Station to Fremantle Station (limited stops) – CircleRoute anti-clockwise, serves Vahland Avenue
