= Huntingdale, Western Australia =

Huntingdale Perth, Western Australia
- Coordinates: 32°04′59″S 115°57′58″E
- Population: 9,021 (SAL 2021)
- Postcode(s): 6110
- Location: 20 km (12 mi) from Perth
- LGA(s): City of Gosnells
- State electorate(s): Southern River, Gosnells
- Federal division(s): Burt
Suburbs around Huntingdale:
Thornlie	Kenwick	Gosnells
Canning Vale	Huntingdale	Gosnells
Southern River	Southern River	Southern River

Huntingdale is a southeastern suburb of Perth, Western Australia. It is part of the City of Gosnells local government area, which suggested the name of the suburb in 1974 as it was used by local developers as a promotional name. It is largely a residential suburb with associated schools and small businesses, mainly existing to service local residents. Homes in the area include a section of older residences constructed mainly in the 1970s, while there was significant new development from the 1990s onward in the southern portion of Huntingdale. There are some remaining pockets of semi-rural land comprising remnants of horticultural and chicken-farming enterprises, but in the early 2000s these were fast being taken over for new residential developments.

== Transport ==
=== Bus ===
- 204 and 205 Maddington Station to Murdoch University – serve Warton Road
- 210 and 211 Thornlie Station to Gosnells Station – serve Corfield Street
- 212 Thornlie Station to Canning Vale – serves Huntingdale Road and Harpenden Street
- 233 Gosnells Station to Cockburn Central Station – serves Southern River Road
- 517 Thornlie Station to Murdoch TAFE – serves Warton Road, Matilda Street, Balfour Street, Gay Street, Southern River Road and Holmes Street
