= City of Gosnells =

Local government area in Perth, Western Australia

Coordinates: 32°04′19″S 115°59′42″E

- Local government area
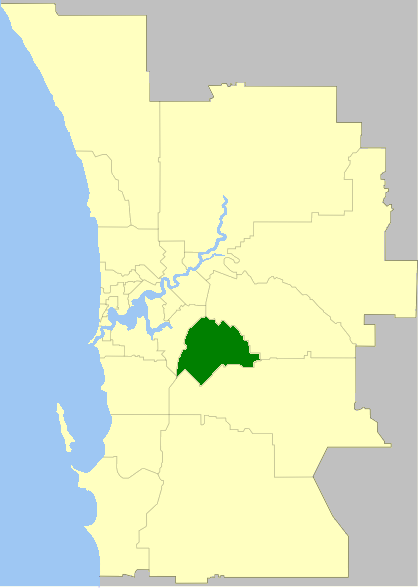
- The City of Gosnells within the Perth Metropolitan Area

- Interactive map of City of Gosnells
- Country: Australia
- State: Western Australia
- Region: SE Metropolitan Perth
- Established: 1907
- Council seat: Gosnells

Government
  - Mayor: Terresa Lynes
  - State electorate: Cannington, Thornlie, Jandakot, Kalamunda, Southern River
  - Federal division: Burt, Canning, Hasluck

Area
  - Total: 128 km^{2} (49 sq mi)

Population
  - Total: 126,376 (LGA 2021)
- Website: City of Gosnells
LGAs around City of Gosnells
Canning		Kalamunda
Canning	City of Gosnells	Kalamunda
Cockburn	Armadale	Armadale

The City of Gosnells is a local government area in the southeastern suburbs of the Western Australian capital city of Perth, located northwest of Armadale and about 20 kilometres (12 mi) southeast of Perth's central business district. The City covers an area of 128 square kilometres (49.42 sq mi), a portion of which is state forest rising into the Darling Scarp to the east, and had a population of approximately 118,500 at the 2016 Census. The largest activity centre in the City is the Central Maddington shopping centre. District centres exist in the Gosnells town centre, Thornlie and Canning Vale.

== History ==
The name Gosnells dates back to 1862 when Charles Gosnell who was the owner of London cosmetic company John Gosnell & Co., bought Canning location 16 from the Davis family who were the original grantees in 1829. While the purchase of the land was a personal investment by Charles Gosnell, when the land was sold to developers in 1903 the developers used the association to the well known cosmetic company, claiming it had bought the land because of its fertile soil to grow flowers for the manufacture of its perfume range. The abundance of the Arum Lily (Zantedeschia aethiopica) in the area and the marketing by the developers contributed to the myth about the Gosnell company, being so successful that the Gosnells railway station was constructed on the Armadale line in 1903.

The Gosnells Road District was created out of the abolished Canning Road District on 1 July 1907. Industry in the form of brickworks were introduced to Beckenham in the early 1990s. Between 1912 and 1915 fruit fly wiped out nearly all of the stone fruit crops in the region and many farmers turned to dairying and market gardening. Irrigation was vital due to sandy, infertile soils of Canning Vale. In 1923, the City received land from Jandakot Road District when that entity was abolished. Significant development did not occur until the post-war years. The population grew from 7,400 in 1954 to about 11,000 in 1966, and then to 21,000 in 1970. On 1 July 1961, Gosnells Road District became the Shire of Gosnells following enactment of the Local Government Act 1960. On 1 July 1973 it gained town status as the Town of Gosnells and assumed its current name when it attained City status on 1 July 1977.

A large industrial estate was first established in Maddington in the 1970s, expanding over the subsequent decades. Commercial and industrial development has also occurred in a linear pattern along Albany Highway between Beckenham and Gosnells.

== Mayors ==
The present mayor is Terresa Lynes, who was elected to the position in October 2021, and reelected in 2023.

== Wards ==
There are currently no wards within the City of Gosnells with the entire electorate represented by 12 councillors. The mayor is now elected by popular vote from the elected councillors.

Prior to 2011, the city was divided into 3 wards, each of 4 councillors. The mayor was directly elected. The three wards were:

- Canning Vale Ward
- Bickley Ward
- Gosnells Ward

== Suburbs ==
The suburbs of the City of Gosnells with population and size figures based on the most recent Australian census:

Suburb	Population	Area	Map
Beckenham	9,092 (SAL 2021)	5.9 km^{2} (2.3 sq mi)	
Canning Vale *	34,504 (SAL 2021)	25.4 km^{2} (9.8 sq mi)	
Gosnells	21,149 (SAL 2021)	14.8 km^{2} (5.7 sq mi)	
Huntingdale	9,021 (SAL 2021)	4.8 km^{2} (1.9 sq mi)	
Kenwick	5,684 (SAL 2021)	9.8 km^{2} (3.8 sq mi)	
Langford	5,505 (SAL 2021)	3.3 km^{2} (1.3 sq mi)	
Maddington	12,419 (SAL 2021)	10.8 km^{2} (4.2 sq mi)	
Martin	1,854 (SAL 2021)	28.4 km^{2} (11.0 sq mi)	
Orange Grove	726 (SAL 2021)	13.8 km^{2} (5.3 sq mi)	
Southern River	12,852 (SAL 2021)	14 km^{2} (5.4 sq mi)	
Thornlie	23,665 (SAL 2021)	11.5 km^{2} (4.4 sq mi)	

( * indicates suburb partially located within City)

== Population ==
Historical population

Year	Pop.	±% p.a.
1911	737	—
1921	1,936	+10.14%
1933	3,016	+3.76%
1947	4,405	+2.74%
1954	7,366	+7.62%
1961	7,524	+0.30%
1966	11,374	+8.62%
1971	22,040	+14.15%
1976	40,422	+12.90%

Year	Pop.	±% p.a.
1981	52,419	+5.34%
1986	60,610	+2.95%
1991	69,342	+2.73%
1996	73,421	+1.15%
2001	79,782	+1.68%
2006	91,579	+2.80%
2011	106,585	+3.08%
2016	118,000	+2.06%
2021	126,376	+1.38%

== Heritage listed places ==
As of 2024, 193 places are heritage-listed in the City of Gosnells, of which three are on the State Register of Heritage Places.
