= Piara Waters, Western Australia =

Piara Waters
- Suburb
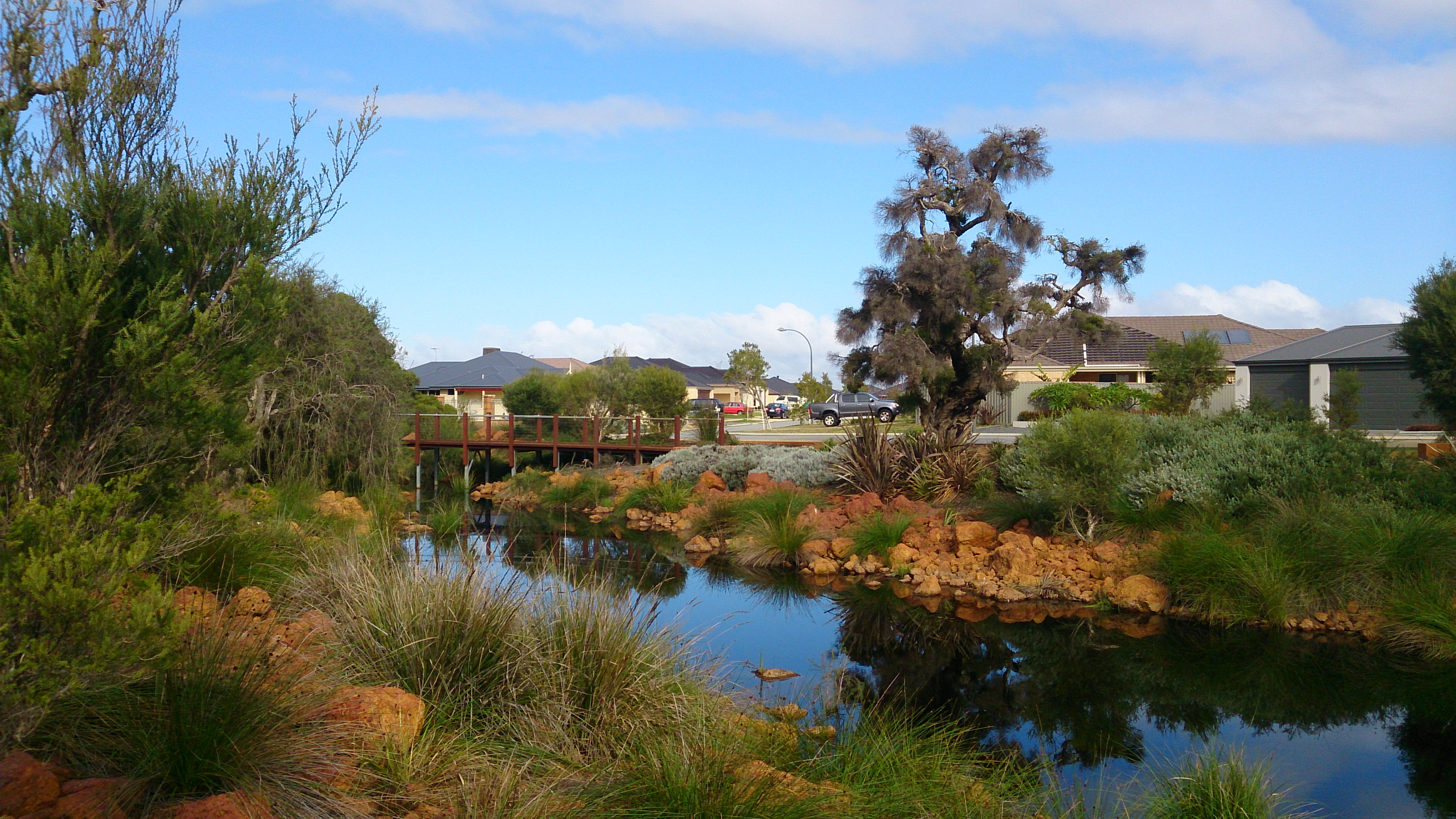
- Housing set alongside natural bushland in Piara Waters
- Interactive map of Piara Waters
- Coordinates: 32.123°S 115.924°E
- Country: Australia
- State: Western Australia
- City: Perth
- LGA: City of Armadale
- Established: 2007

Government
  - State electorate: Oakford
  - Federal division: Burt

Area
  - Total: 6.7 km^{2} (2.6 sq mi)

Population
  - Total: 15,029 (SAL 2021)
- Postcode: 6112
Suburbs around Piara Waters
Canning Vale	Canning Vale	Canning Vale
Treeby	Piara Waters	Harrisdale
Banjup	Banjup	Forrestdale

Piara Waters is a southeastern suburb of Perth, Western Australia within the City of Armadale. Previously part of Forrestdale and gazetted in 2007, Piara Waters is located approximately 20 kilometres (12 mi) south-southeast of Perth.

== Demographics ==
As a suburb that has been converted from small farms to residential lots, the population of Piara Waters has grown significantly from fewer than 100 in 2006 to over 14,000 as of 2021.

To accommodate this growth, new community and sporting facilities have been built. Piara Waters Primary School was opened in February 2012 (catering for students from Kindergarten to Year 6), and Piara Waters Senior High School began accepting students in early 2023. The school commenced with Year 7 students and will add each year to its growing cohort, until it reaches Year 12 in 2028.

In the latter half of 2023, the proposed Piara Waters Shopping Centre was opened to the public.

For the older community, a new residential lifestyle resort between Southampton Drive and Warton Road is currently populated with residents while ongoing development continues.

== History ==
The suburb gets its name from the candlestick banksia (Banksia attenuata), called biyara in Noongar language. This name was suggested by the Friends of Forrestdale.

A large, central part of the suburb is taken up by the Piara Nature Reserve. This area was set on fire in March 2012 and threatened homes, but the fire was successfully contained by firefighters.

The suburb was the site of an out-of-control party in September 2012 that transformed into a youth riot which was the subject of Australian national news. Over 500 people were reported to have attended the party in a vacant warehouse. More than 80 police attended the scene and were attacked with rocks, bottles and poles. One person was stabbed in the incident and an ambulance damaged on the night.

On 4 November 2023, a playground was destroyed when two 12-year-old boys started a bushfire.

In October 2024, the first Starbucks in Western Australia was opened in Piara Waters.

== Transport ==
=== Bus ===
- 233 Cockburn Central Station to Gosnells Station – serves Armadale Road and Nicholson Road
- 518 Cockburn Central Station to Murdoch TAFE – serves Armadale Road and Wright Road
- 519 Murdoch TAFE to Armadale Station – serves Nicholson Road
- 529 Cockburn Central Station to Armadale Station – serves Armadale Road

== Gallery ==
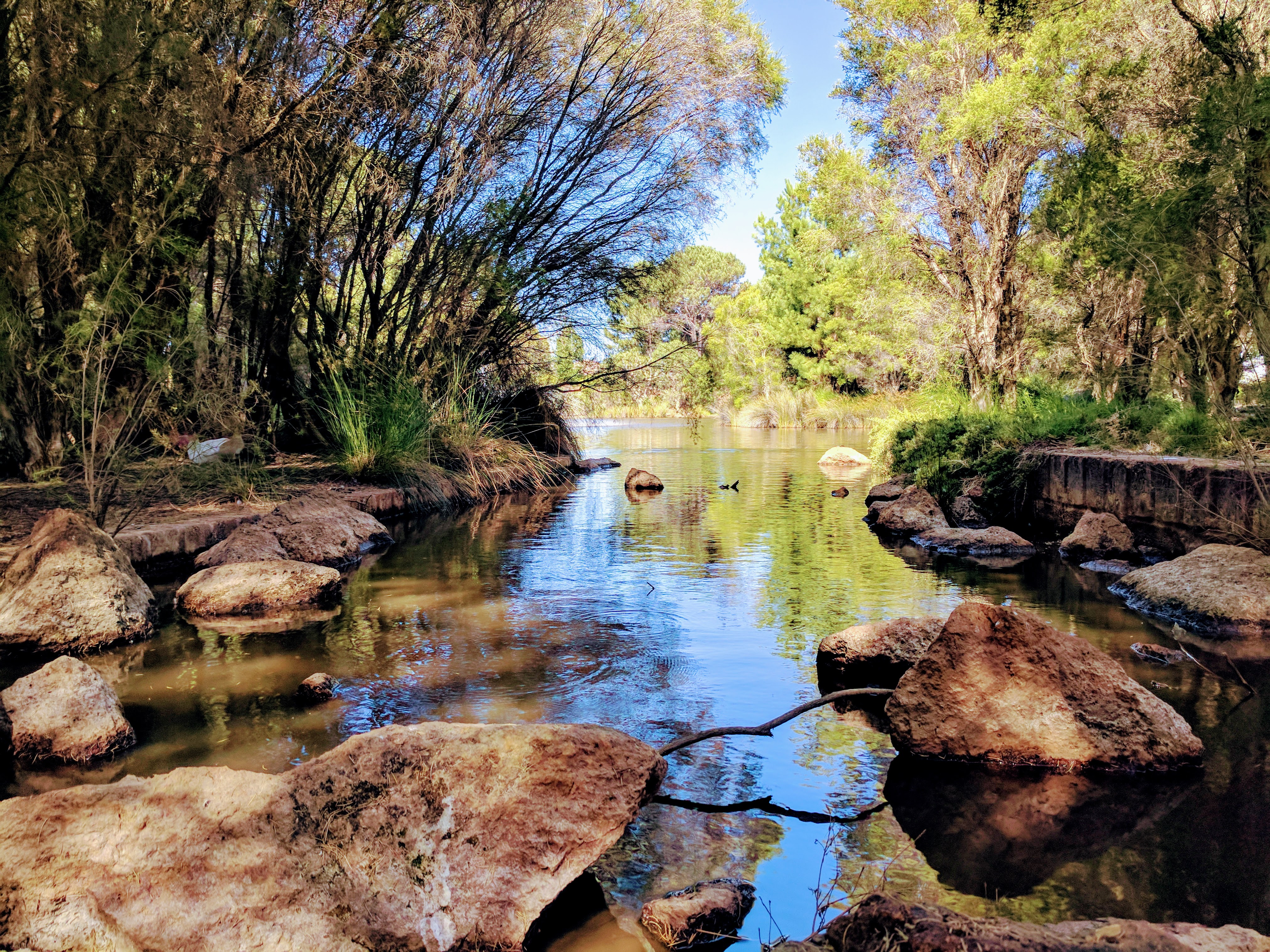
Lakeside view at Broadway park

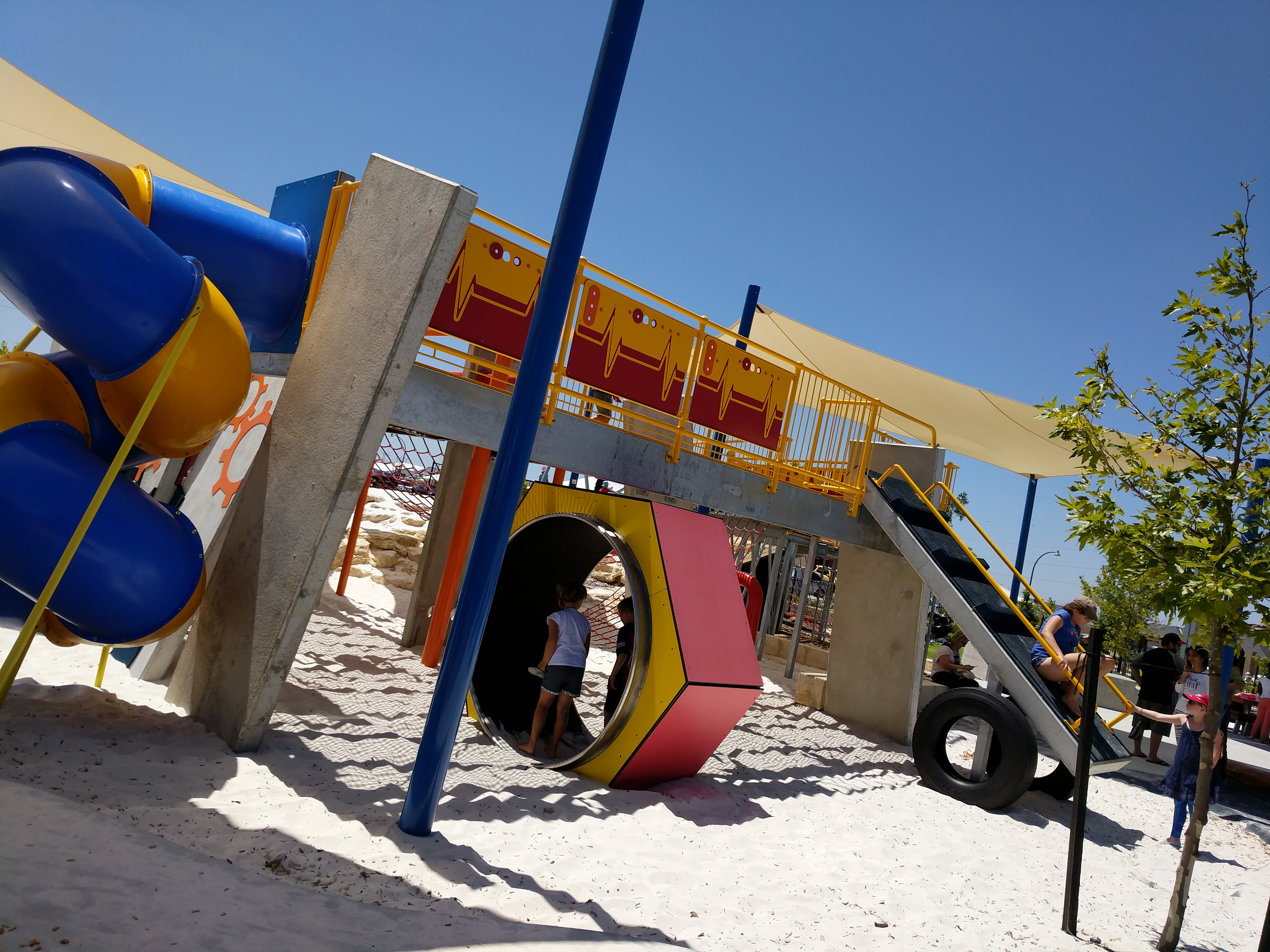
Playground at Robot park

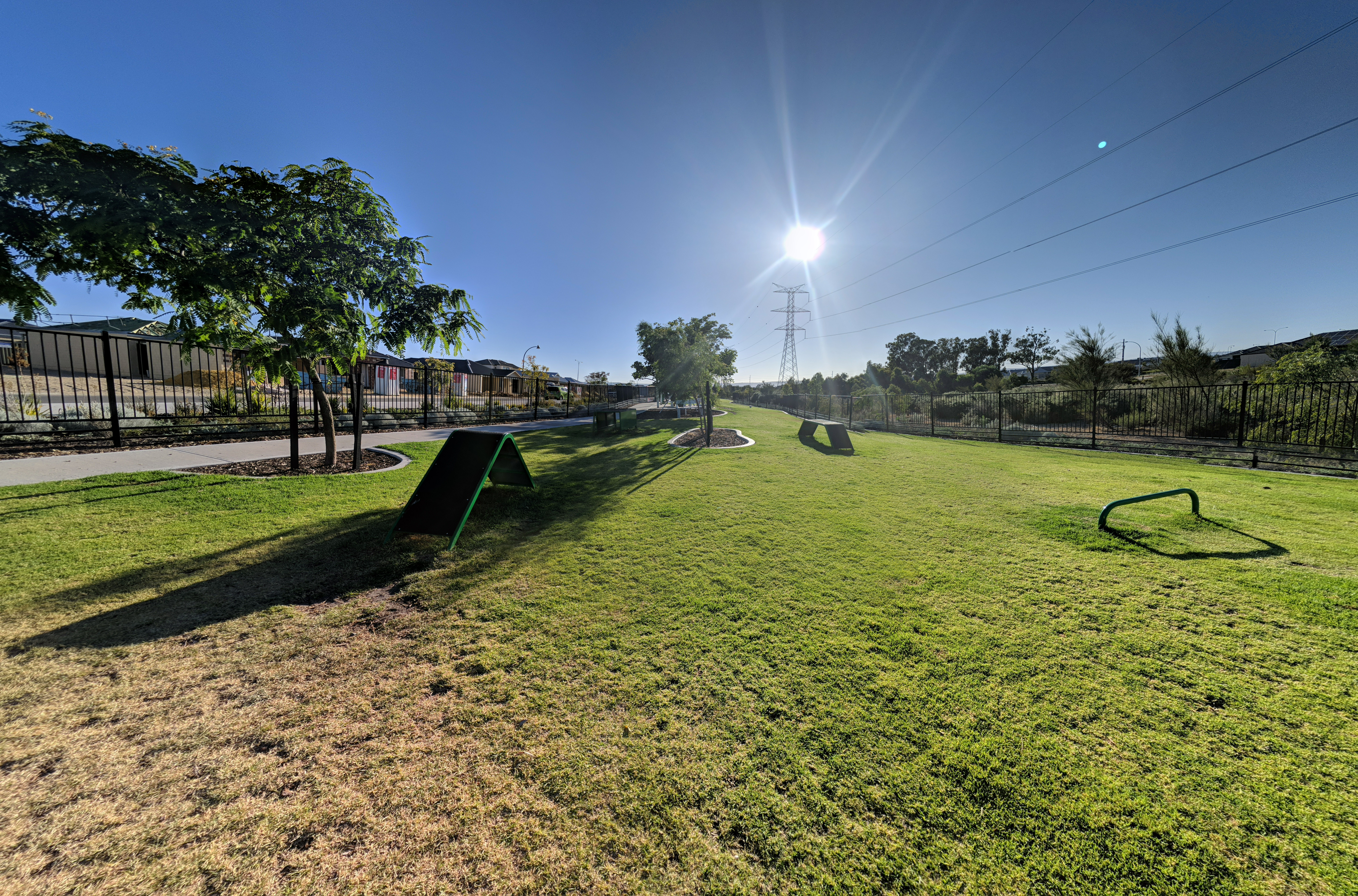
Piara Waters enclosed dog park

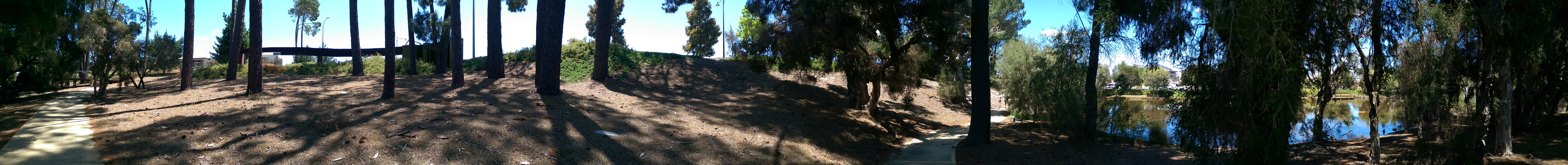
A panoramic view of Broadway park
