= List of lakes of Western Australia, L–P =

This list includes all lakes, both intermittent and perennial. It is complete with respect to the 1996 Gazetteer of Australia. Dubious names have been checked against the online 2004 data, and in all cases confirmed correct. However, if any lakes have been gazetted or deleted since 1996, this list does not reflect these changes. Strictly speaking, Australian place names are gazetted in capital letters only; the names in this list have been converted to mixed case in accordance with normal capitalisation conventions. Locations are as gazetted; some lakes may extend over large areas.

== L ==
Name	Coordinates	Remarks
Lake Lanagan	19°34′S 126°27′E	
Leech Lakes	29°53′S 125°39′E	
Lake Lefroy	31°18′S 121°41′E	
Lake Leschenaultia	31°51′S 116°15′E	
Lake Liddelow	32°27′S 119°17′E	
Lightfoot Lake	29°25′S 123°17′E	
Lily Hole Billabong	18°11′S 125°42′E	
Lime Lake	33°25′S 117°23′E	
Little Cattaminnup Lake	34°29′S 116°24′E	
Little Dornducking Lake	33°25′S 117°28′E	
Little Mariginiup Lake	31°43′S 115°49′E	
Little Monjingup Lake	33°48′S 121°48′E	
Little Namendarra Lake	28°17′S 122°9′E	
Lake Little Nedo	29°46′S 116°18′E	
Little Norring Lake	33°26′S 117°18′E	
Little Parkeyerring Lake	33°23′S 117°20′E	
Little Unicup Lake	34°20′S 116°43′E	
Lake Lockhart	33°19′S 119°4′E	
Lake Logue	29°51′S 115°8′E	
Long Hole Billabong	18°37′S 125°37′E	
Lake Louisa	17°3′S 122°52′E	
Lake Lucas	20°56′S 128°51′E	
Lukin Lake	33°0′S 117°29′E	
Lake Lyons	20°16′S 126°12′E	

== M ==
Name	Coordinates	Remarks
Lake Mackay	22°36′S 128°37′E	Ephemeral
Lake Macleod	24°7′S 113°39′E	
Lake Maddox	20°1′S 127°53′E	
Magdhaba Lake	33°26′S 119°20′E	
Lake Magenta	33°27′S 119°10′E	
Main Yarp	16°53′S 122°59′E	
Lake Maitland	27°11′S 121°5′E	
Man Man Lake	17°15′S 123°2′E	
Manaring Lake	31°53′S 116°19′E	
Manning Lake	32°6′S 115°46′E	
Mappa Lake	28°16′S 122°7′E	
Margarette Lake	30°42′S 117°32′E	
Mariginiup Lake	31°43′S 115°49′E	
Lake Maringup	34°50′S 116°12′E	
Martagallup Lake	34°27′S 117°31′E	
Martins Tank Lake	32°51′S 115°40′E	
Martinup Lake	33°32′S 117°10′E	
Martup Pool	33°33′S 117°5′E	
Lake Matilda	34°26′S 117°34′E	
Lake Mc Innes	28°22′S 124°12′E	
Mckail Lake	34°59′S 117°50′E	
Mckays Lake	29°2′S 114°54′E	
Lake McLarty	32°42′S 115°43′E	
Lake Mclernon	19°35′S 126°32′E	
Loch McNess	31°32′S 115°40′E	
Lake Mears	32°14′S 117°21′E	
Lake Medcalf	32°28′S 120°49′E	
Lake Meenulup	34°26′S 117°33′E	
Melijinup Lake	33°47′S 121°52′E	
Mellon Hole Billabong	18°24′S 125°33′E	
Lake Mends	33°3′S 121°0′E	
Lake Merril	19°27′S 124°35′E	
Mettler Lake	34°35′S 118°36′E	
Lake Milarup	33°11′S 119°40′E	
Millar Lake	27°53′S 125°28′E	
Mille Mille Lake	17°8′S 123°1′E	
Milyunup Lake	34°13′S 117°38′E	
Mindarie Lake	31°35′S 115°42′E	
Minerup Lake	33°37′S 117°45′E	
Lake Miranda	27°41′S 120°33′E	
Mission Lake	31°4′S 115°37′E	
Moates Lake	34°57′S 118°6′E	
Mollerin Lake	30°30′S 117°35′E	
Lake Molyelup	34°31′S 117°28′E	
Lake Monger	31°56′S 115°50′E	renamed to Galup in 2025
Mongers Lake	29°29′S 116°41′E	
Mongers Lake	28°56′S 117°19′E	
Monjingup Lake	33°48′S 121°48′E	
Lake Montbazin	25°36′S 113°29′E	
Lake Moore	29°33′S 117°34′E	
Moorilurrup Lake	34°34′S 117°38′E	
Moorinup Lake	34°15′S 116°42′E	
Morande Lake	34°46′S 117°55′E	
Lake Moriaty	29°51′S 121°11′E	
Lake Morris	33°28′S 119°14′E	
Lake Mortijinup	33°49′S 121°39′E	
Lake Mowilyilip	34°43′S 117°37′E	
Lake Moyanup	32°52′S 115°57′E	
Lake Muckenburra	31°20′S 115°47′E	
Lake Muir	34°31′S 116°40′E	
Mullet Lake	33°48′S 121°57′E	
Lake Mungala	31°26′S 115°54′E	
Munrillup Lake	34°14′S 117°40′E	
Murapin Lake	33°32′S 117°11′E	
Murrin Lake	33°23′S 117°25′E	

== N ==
Name	Coordinates	Remarks
Lake Nabberu	25°34′S 120°16′E	
Nallan Lake	27°15′S 117°59′E	
Nalyerin Lake	33°9′S 116°22′E	
Lake Nambarup	33°47′S 121°36′E	
Nambling Lakes	31°14′S 116°59′E	
Lake Nambung	31°26′S 115°53′E	
Namendarra Lake	28°17′S 122°9′E	
Namming Lake	30°54′S 115°34′E	
Nanamullen Lake	31°41′S 116°31′E	
Lake Nangar	31°19′S 116°3′E	
Lake Navarino	32°51′S 115°59′E	
Lake Nedo	29°48′S 116°17′E	
Lake Needoonga	31°24′S 116°6′E	
Neerabup Lake	31°40′S 115°45′E	
Lake Negri	32°0′S 115°31′E	
Lake Nerramyne	27°48′S 115°25′E	
Lake Newnham	32°54′S 115°42′E	
Lake Ngartiminny	33°34′S 116°26′E	
Lake Ninan	30°57′S 116°39′E	
Nomans Lake	33°0′S 117°30′E	
Nonalling Lake	32°32′S 117°37′E	
Noobijup Lake	34°24′S 116°47′E	
Lake Noonan	33°6′S 119°3′E	
Lake Noondie	28°37′S 119°21′E	
Noonying Lake	31°39′S 117°27′E	
Normans Lake	33°0′S 117°30′E	
Norring Lake	33°27′S 117°17′E	
North Lake	32°5′S 115°49′E	
Nowergup Lake	31°38′S 115°44′E	
Nukennullup Lake	34°25′S 117°19′E	
Nullan Lake	27°41′S 118°18′E	
Nullewa Lake	29°7′S 116°14′E	
Nunijup Lake	34°24′S 117°24′E	
Lake Nyandyeetup	34°49′S 117°43′E	

== O ==
Name	Coordinates	Remarks
Lake O'Connor	32°29′S 119°13′E	
Oaljalup Lake	34°18′S 116°25′E	
Old Station Billabong	15°40′S 128°41′E	
One Tree Billabong	18°28′S 125°27′E	
Lake Ottaway	33°12′S 119°4′E	

== P ==
Name	Coordinates	Remarks
Pabelup Lake	34°6′S 119°24′E	
Lake Pallarup	33°14′S 119°45′E	
Pansy Lake	32°52′S 120°59′E	
Paperbark Lake	33°35′S 115°31′E	
Parkeyerring Lake	33°22′S 117°21′E	
Lake Paterson	17°2′S 123°8′E	
Pearse Lakes	32°0′S 115°32′E	
Pelican Billabong	18°31′S 125°20′E	
Peninsula Lake	33°35′S 115°31′E	
Lake Penny	30°33′S 121°53′E	
Percival Lakes	21°22′S 124°41′E	
Lake Percy	31°49′S 120°10′E	
Lake Perkolilli	30°34′S 121°43′E	
Lake Perks	33°38′S 122°22′E	
Perry Lakes	31°57′S 115°47′E	
Pindicup Lake	34°25′S 116°43′E	
Pine Lake	28°31′S 117°56′E	
Lake Pingarnup	33°38′S 118°33′E	
Lake Pingrup	33°26′S 118°28′E	
Pinjarrega Lake	30°5′S 115°55′E	
Pink Lake	33°51′S 121°50′E	
Pink Lake	32°0′S 115°31′E	
Lake Pleasant View	34°49′S 118°11′E	
Pleiades Lakes	29°12′S 124°57′E	
Plover Lake	33°36′S 115°30′E	
Plumridge Lakes	29°27′S 125°16′E	
Lake Pollard	32°49′S 115°40′E	
Lake Poongkaliyarra	20°59′S 117°7′E	
Porlell Lake	26°54′S 118°27′E	
Lake Powell	35°1′S 117°44′E	
Prescott Lakes	20°41′S 125°6′E	
Lake Preston	32°58′S 115°41′E	
Pyramid Lake	33°13′S 120°56′E	

== See also ==
- List of lakes in Western Australia
