= Booragoon Lake =

Lake in Perth, Western Australia

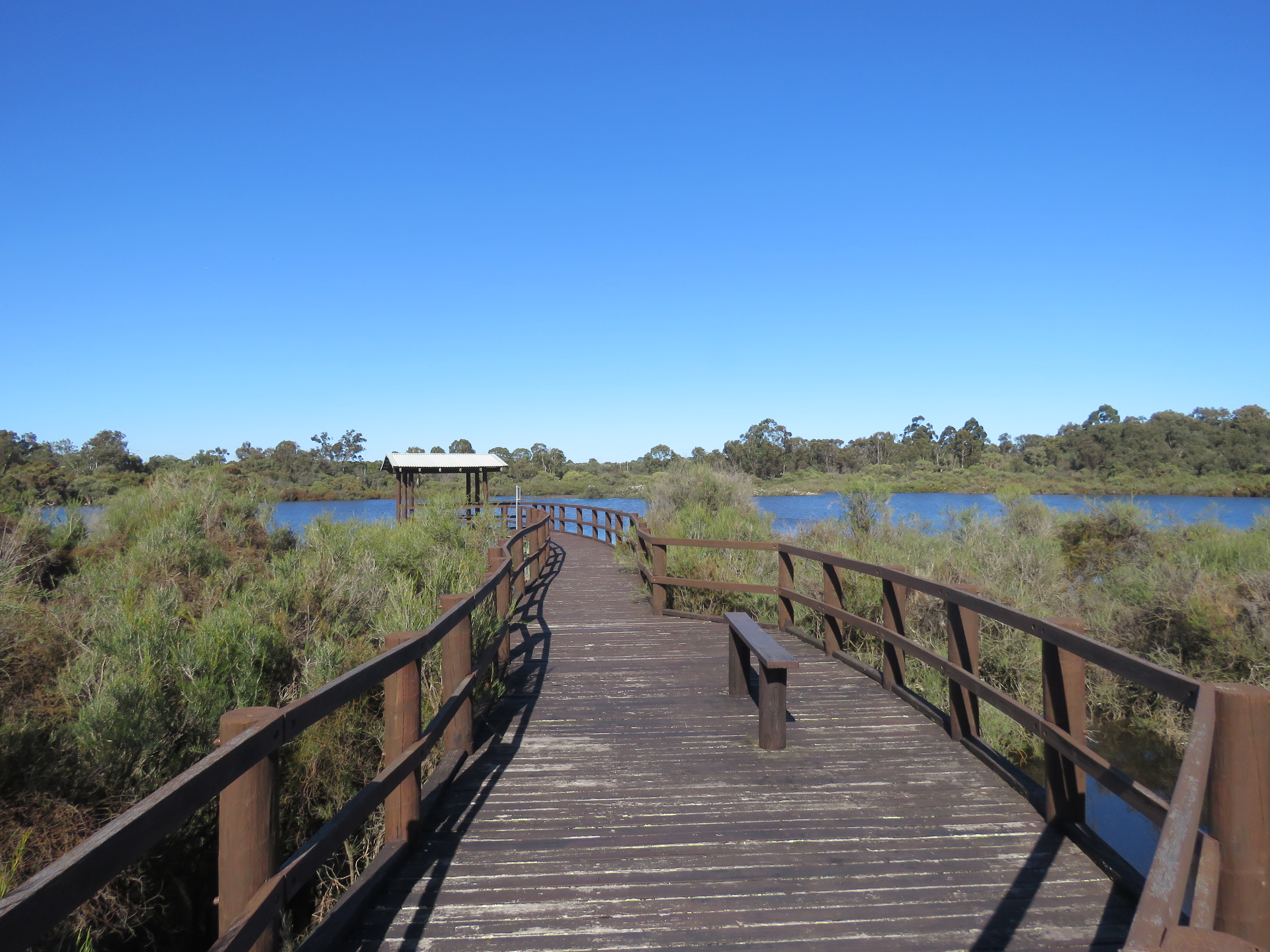
- Booragoon Lake, seen from the north in August 2021

- Location within Perth
- Interactive map of Booragoon Lake
- Location: Perth, Western Australia
- Coordinates: 32°02′40″S 115°50′34″E
- Type: Freshwater
- Primary inflows: Stormwater
- Primary outflows: evaporation
- Catchment area: 19 hectares (47 acres)
- Basin countries: Australia
- Designation: Beeliar Regional Park
- Max. length: 350 metres (1,148 ft)
- Max. width: 200 metres (656 ft)
- Surface area: 4.09 hectares (10 acres)
- Max. depth: 1.5 metres (5 ft)
- Shore length^{1}: 841 metres (2,759 ft)
- Islands: 0.37 hectares (1 acre)
- ^{1} Shore length is not a well-defined measure.

Booragoon Lake is a small freshwater lake in suburban Perth, Western Australia.

The freshwater lake is situated in the suburb of Booragoon and is bounded by Leach Highway, Lang Street and Aldridge Road. It makes up part of the eastern wetland of the Beeliar Regional Park along with Blue Gum Lake and North Lake. The reserve that the lake is part of has a total area of 23,161 square metres (6 acres). The wetland is part of the East Beeliar chain of wetlands.

The lake supports large numbers of breeding birds, including the largest known breeding colony of the great cormorant (Phalacrocorax carbo) in Western Australia. It is also one of the largest breeding colonies of the little black cormorant (P. sulcirostris) in south-western Australia.

It is listed as a Wetland of International Importance due to meeting one Ramsar criterion.

The lake is fed by groundwater and stormwater drainage from surrounding urban streets. The site is contains a board walk and flor a fauna information signs managed by the City of Melville, and is an important area for nature conservation and nature study.

Booragoon Lake is surrounded by low closed-forest of river gum (Eucalyptus rudis) and swamp paperbark trees (Melaleuca rhaphiophylla). Other species include Banksia littoralis and Astartea fascicularis. The closed-scrub is dominated by Melaleuca teretifolia.

The site holds significance to the Beeliar Nyoongar people due to the seasonal presence of freshwater, birds, shellfish and turtles for food.

== Gallery ==
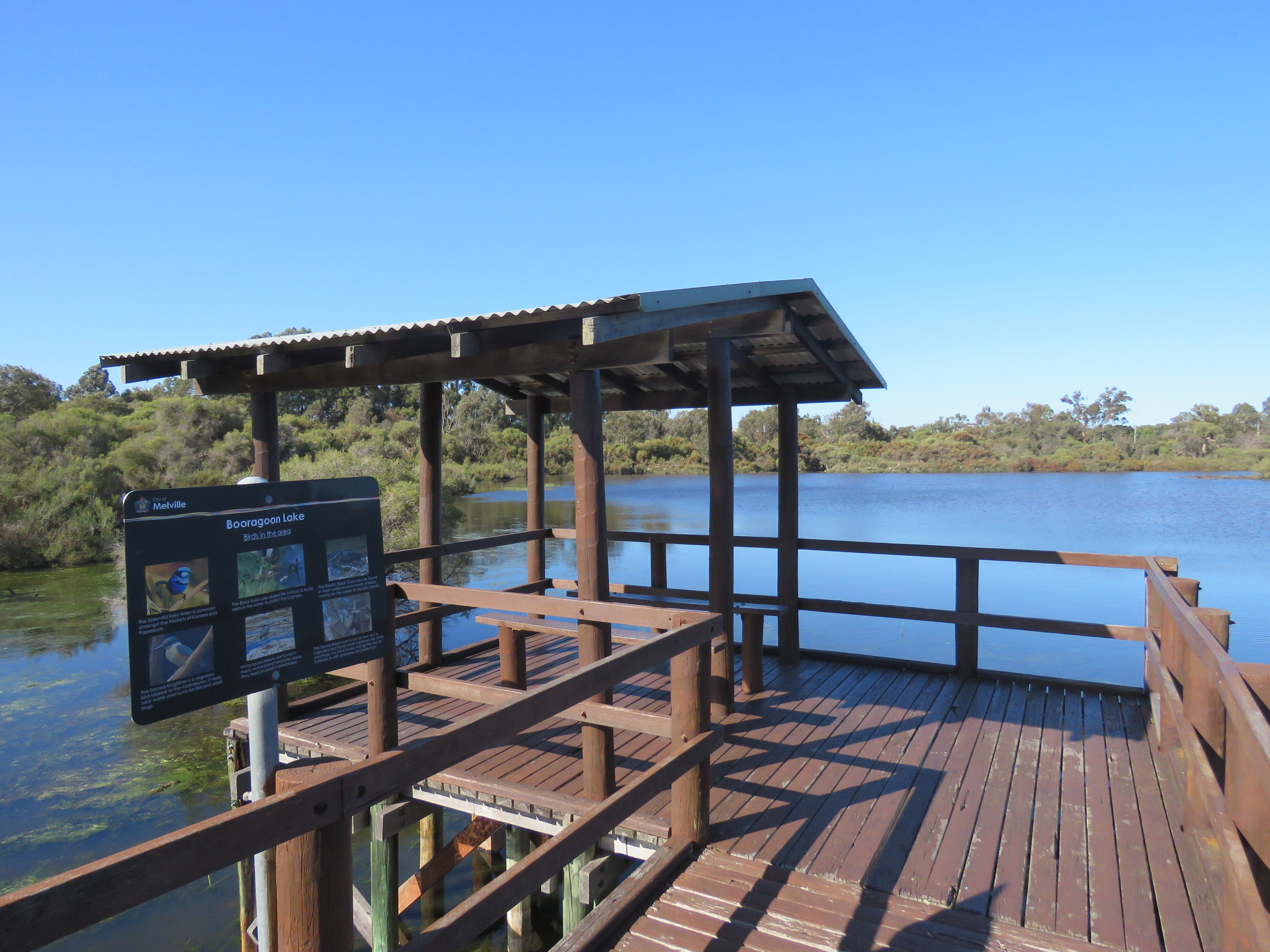
Boardwalk at Booragoon Lake

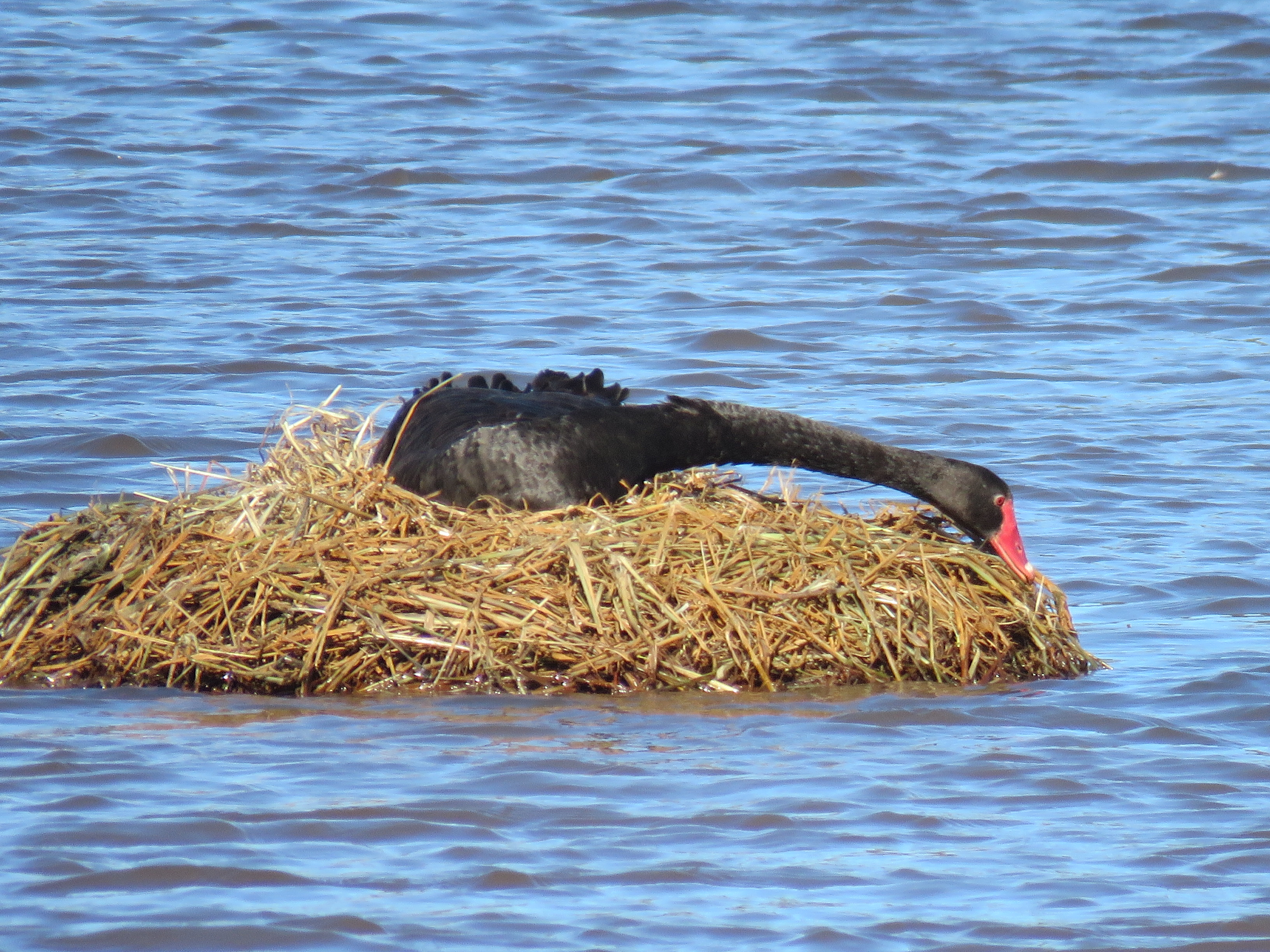
Black swan (Cygnus atratus) nest at Booragoon Lake

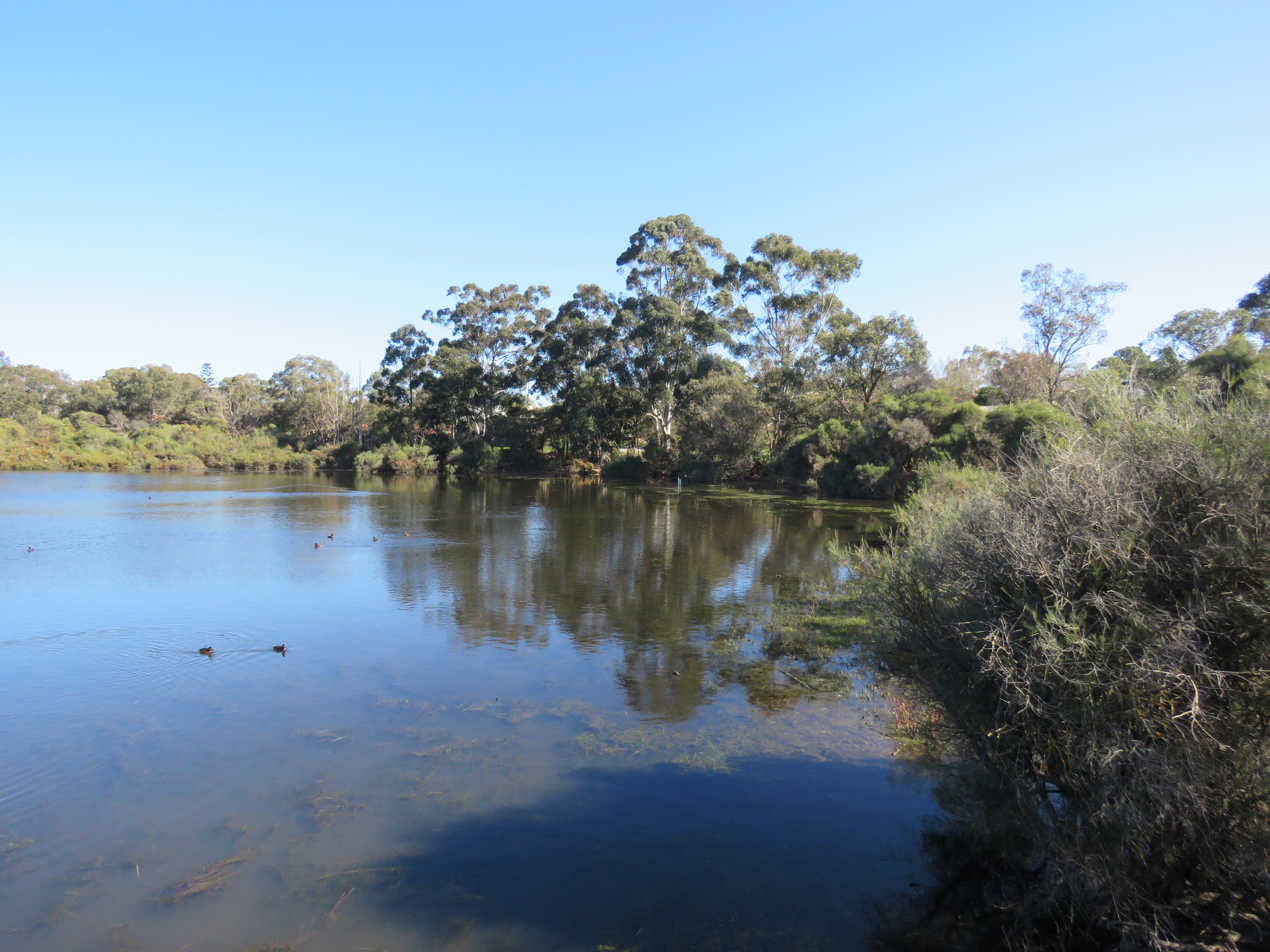
Booragoon Lake shore

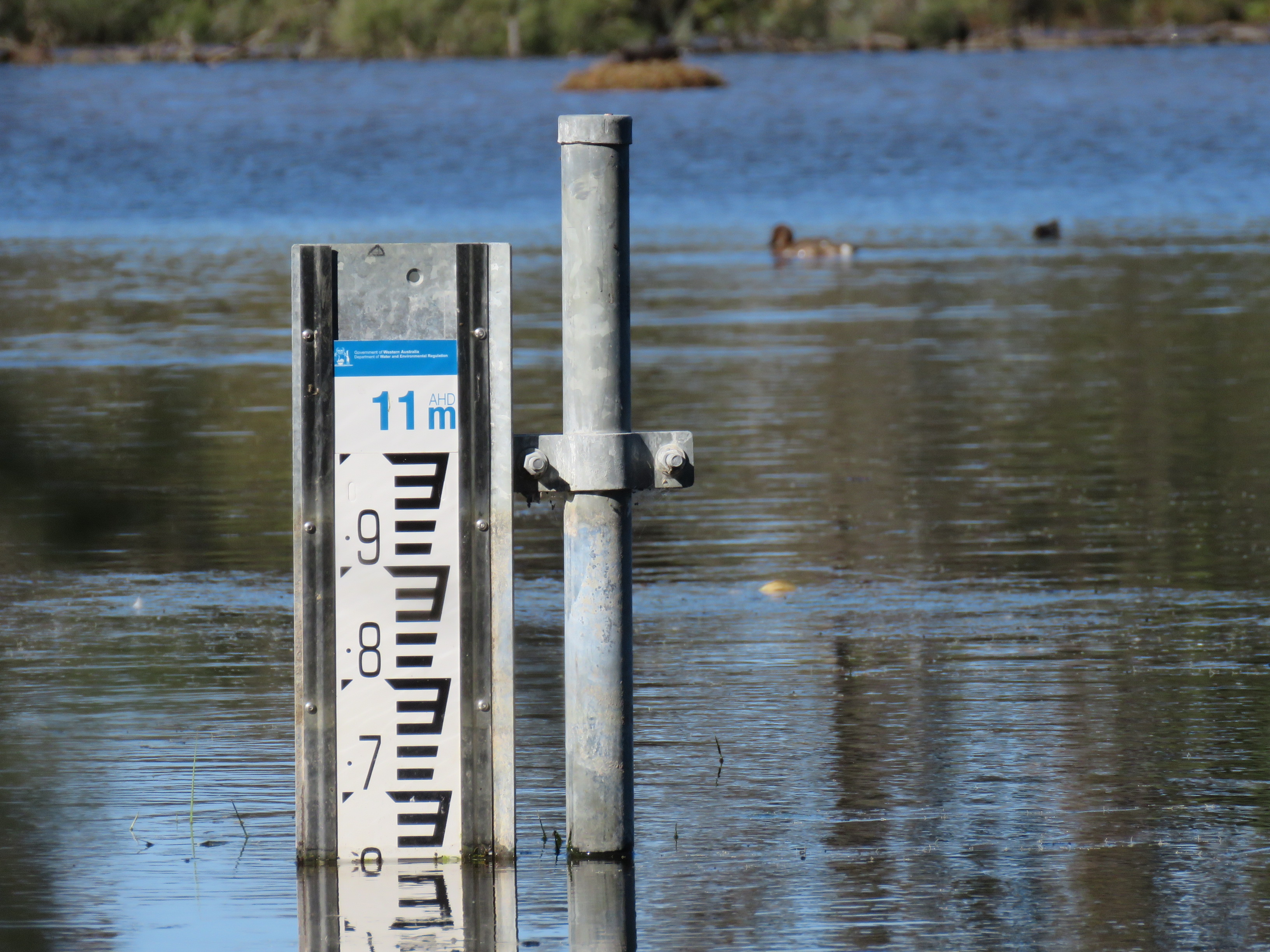
Water level metre at Booragoon Lake

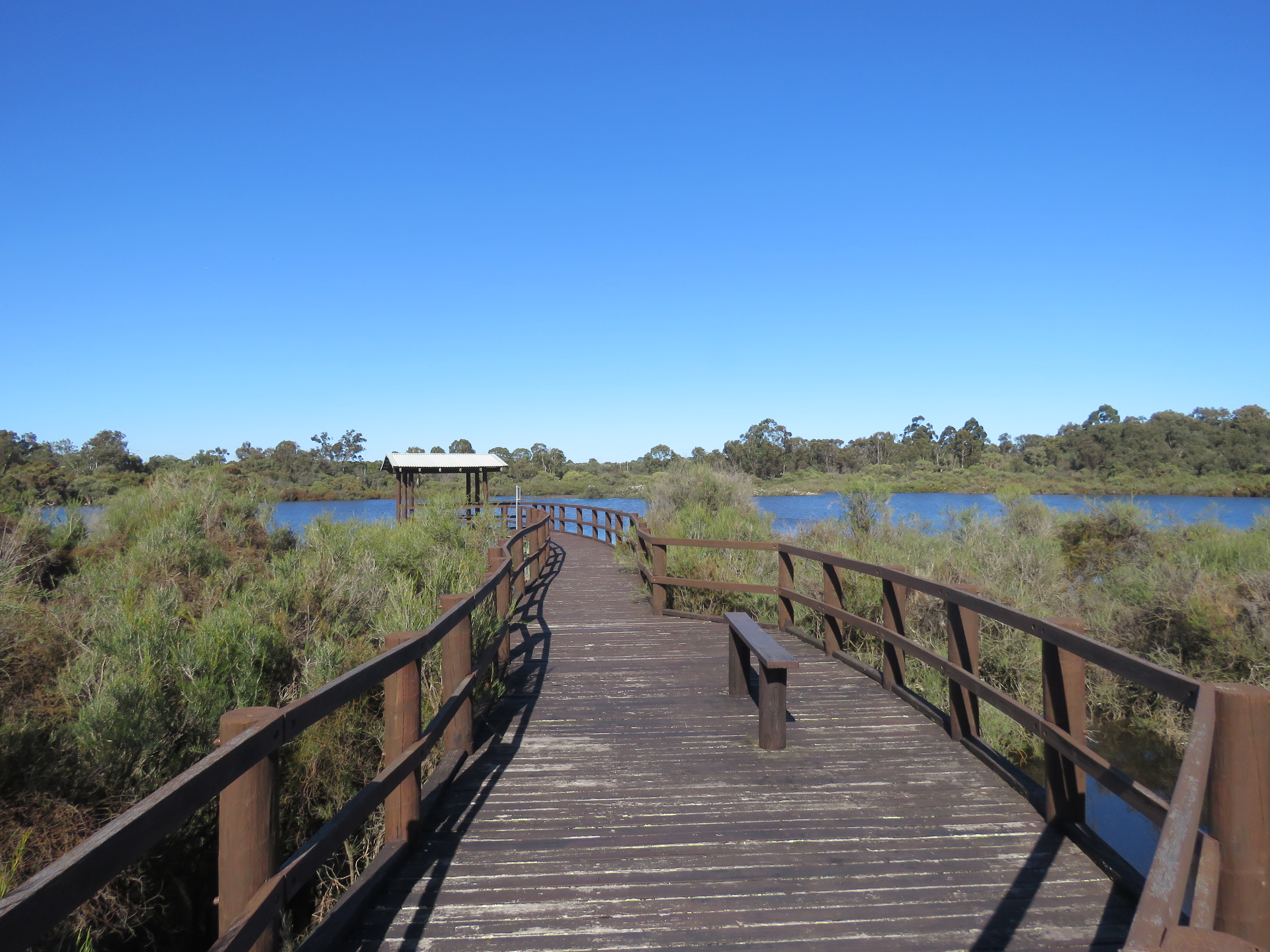
Boardwalk at Booragoon Lake

'

== See also ==
- List of lakes of Australia § Western Australia
