= Lake McLarty =

Lake and nature reserve in Western Australia

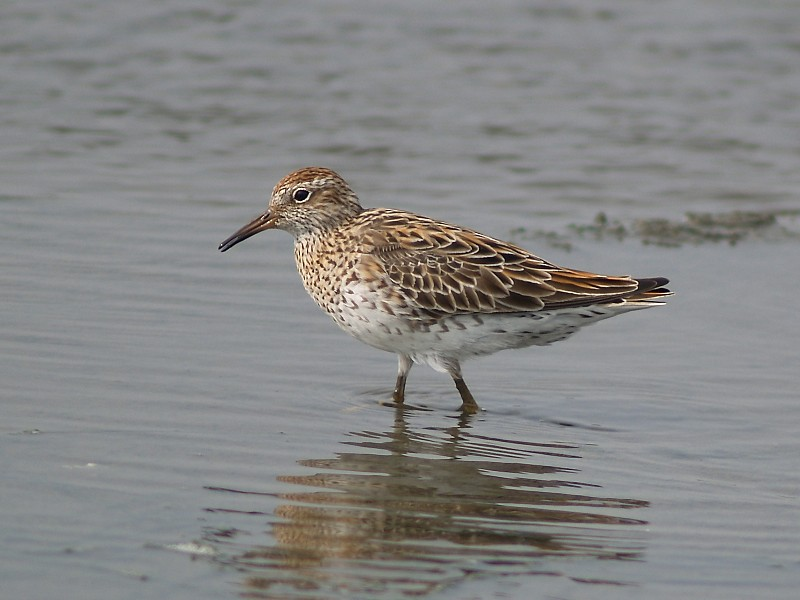
- The lake is an important site for sharp-tailed sandpipers

- Location in Western Australia
- Interactive map of Lake McLarty
- Location: Birchmont, Shire of Murray, Western Australia
- Coordinates: 32°42′19″S 115°42′50″E
- Type: Freshwater
- Basin countries: Australia
- Designation: Lake McLarty Nature Reserve; Peel-Yalgorup System Ramsar site
- Max. length: 2.1 km (1.3 mi)
- Max. width: 1.25 km (0.78 mi)

Lake McLarty is a 219-hectare (540-acre) freshwater lake and associated nature reserve on the Swan Coastal Plain of Western Australia. The lake is named after a prominent pioneering family which settled in the district in the early 1860s. It lies about 90 kilometres (56 mi) south of Perth on the eastern side of the Harvey Estuary and forms part of the Peel-Yalgorup System Ramsar site. It is an important area for waders, or shorebirds, and is a well-known birdwatching site.

== Description ==
The lake is oval and shallow with a gently sloping bed. Maximum open water coverage is an area of about 2.1 kilometres (1.3 mi) (north-south) by 1.25 kilometres (0.78 mi) (east-west). It lies in a natural depression in the coastal plain and is separated from the eastern shoreline of the Harvey Estuary by a vegetated fossil dune ridge some 600 metres (2,000 ft) across.

== Flora and fauna ==
=== Plants ===
About 30 plant species have been recorded. There are stands of banbar and swamp paperbark fringing the northern and eastern margins, with a patchy understorey of broadleaf cumbungi. The south-western corner is dominated by pasture and the midsection of the western shore is open eucalypt woodland, including tuarts, flooded gums and swamp peppermints, with a grass understorey. Other species present include spearwood, golden-wreath wattle, Swan River peppermint and sheoaks. Six species of orchid have been recorded in the reserve, including pink fairy and cowslip orchids.

=== Birds ===
The exposed mudflats around the lake form essential feeding habitat for migratory waders. Some 163 hectares (400 acres) of the reserve has been identified by BirdLife International as an Important Bird Area (IBA) because it regularly supports over 1% of the world populations of red-necked stints, sharp-tailed sandpipers, white-headed stilts, red-necked avocets and red-capped plovers, and sometimes large numbers of blue-billed ducks.

== See also ==
- List of lakes of Australia § Western Australia
