= The Spectacles Wetlands =

Wetlands in Perth, Western Australia

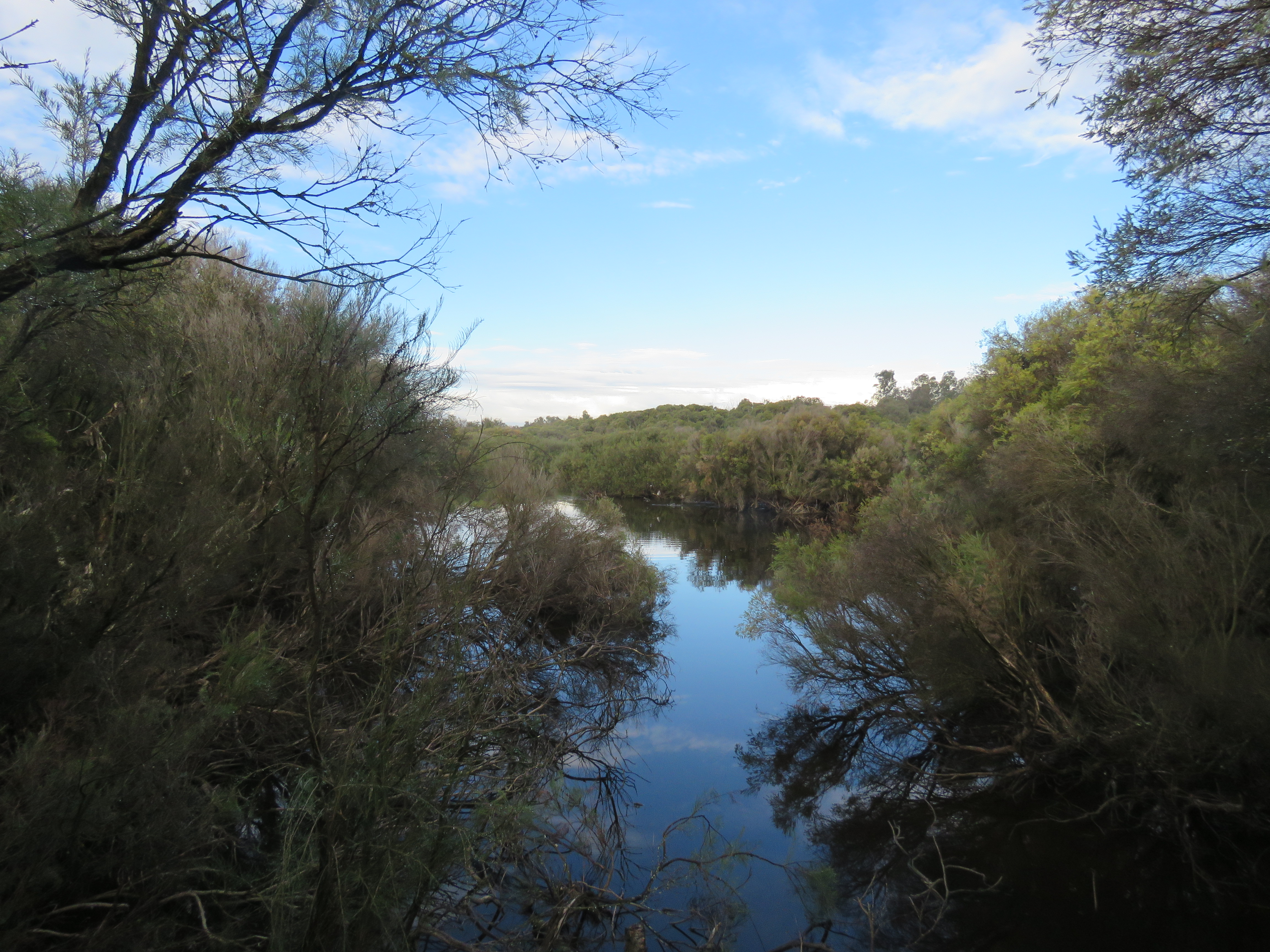
- View from Biara Lookout

- Location within Western Australia
- Interactive map of The Spectacles Wetlands
- Location: The Spectacles, Western Australia
- Coordinates: 32°12′54″S 115°50′02″E
- Type: Wetland
- Primary outflows: Peel Main Drain
- Basin countries: Australia
- Surface area: 350 hectares (865 acres)

The Spectacles Wetlands (Nyungar: Djinining) is a wetland in the eponymous suburb, 30 kilometres (19 mi) south of the central business district of Perth, the capital of Western Australia. It is part of Beeliar Regional Park.

It consists of two distinct swamps, the Large Eye Swamp in the north and the Small Eye Swamp in the south. The wetland is also on the City of Kwinana heritage list.

== History ==
The area of the Beeliar Regional Park, with its freshwater lakes, was an important camping area and source of food for the Beeliar clan of the Whadjuk people from the Noongar nation. A major trade route connecting the Swan and Murray River passed through the wetlands of what is now Beeliar Regional Park.

European records of the Spectacles Wetlands date back to 1841, when the area was first surveyed by Thomas Watson.

The Spectacles were part of the Peel Estate post-First World War Group Settlement Scheme but, unlike the other wetlands of the estate, were not drained at the time. The Peel Main Drain runs through the wetland and the supporting Baldivis tramway run to the west of it.

The wetland is now part of Beeliar Regional Park, being the southern-most component of the park, and a Bush Forever site. It has an area of 350 hectares (865 acres) and features include a 4.7-kilometre (3 mi) Aboriginal Heritage Trail around the larger, northern, wetland, and the Biara Boardwalk Trail on the western side of it.

Public access to the wetlands is through the carpark on McLaughlain Road, on the western side of the Spectacles. The access road on the eastern side, Spectacles Drive, has been closed off.

A large part of the wetlands is under private ownership by Alcoa but open to the public. Alcoa purchased the land for industrial purposes and as a dump site but its wetland nature meant it was unsuitable for such a purpose. Through the same evaluation it also became clear that the area was of high conservation value.

On 13 May 1998, the Spectacles Wetlands were added to the Town of Kwinana, now City of Kwinana, heritage list.

== Flora ==
In common with other areas of the regional park, the upland of the Spectacles is an area of low woodland and forest of eucalypts, casuarina and banksia, consisting of jarrah, Corymbia calophylla, candlestick banksia, firewood banksia and western sheoak.

In the wetland component of the Spectacles, the vegetation consists of swamp paperbark, stout paperbark, Melaleuca teretifolia and flooded gum. Sedges in the form of Isolepis are also present at the southern wetland of the Spectacles; those are rare.
