= The Spectacles =

The Spectacles may refer to:

- The Spectacles, Western Australia, a suburb of Perth, Western Australia
  - The Spectacles Wetlands, a wetland in the above suburb
- The Spectacles (short story), a short story by Edgar Allan Poe
- The Spectacle Maker, a 1934 short film
