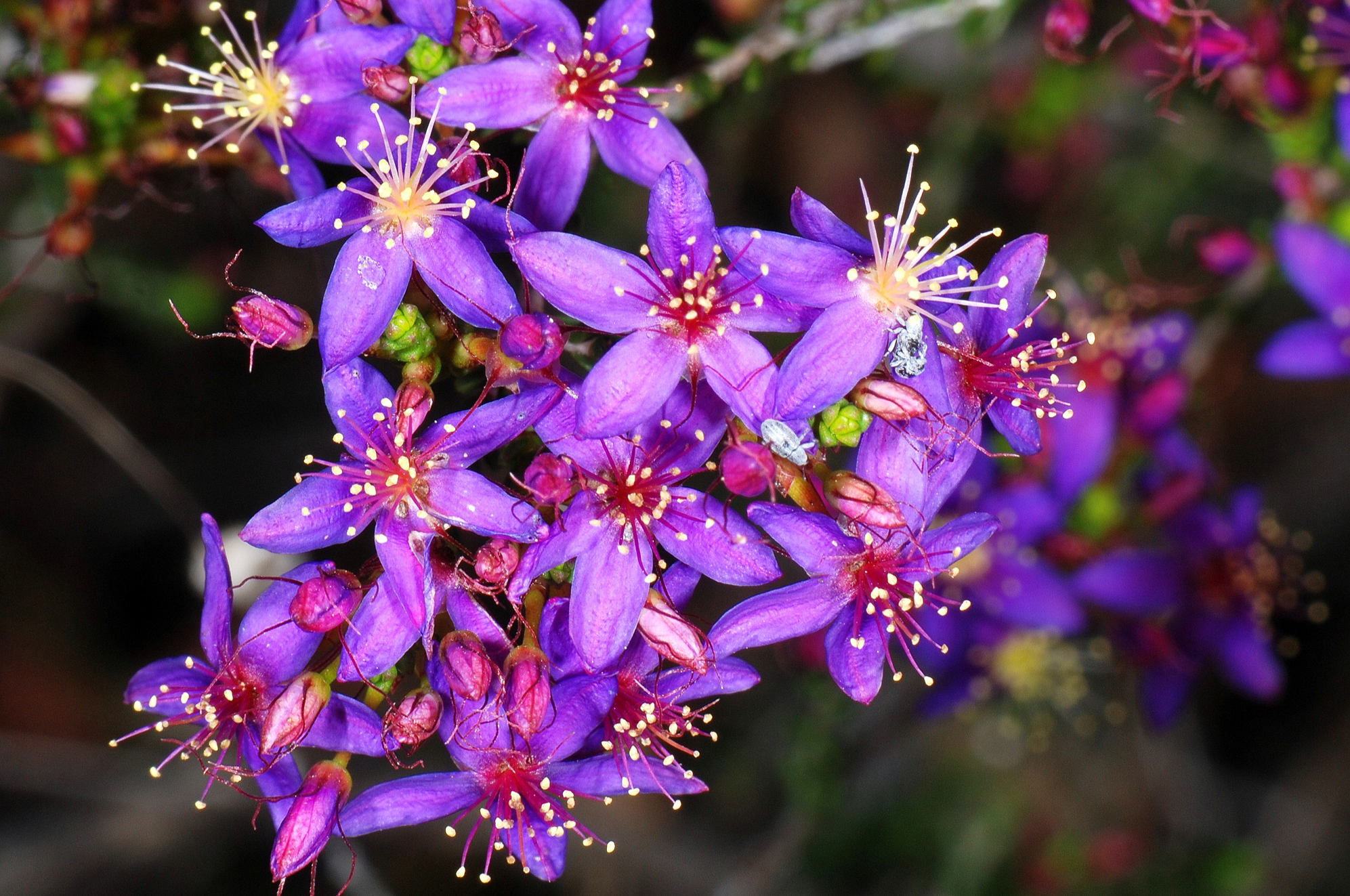
- In Wandoo National Park

Scientific classification
- Kingdom: Plantae
- Clade: Tracheophytes
- Clade: Angiosperms
- Clade: Eudicots
- Clade: Rosids
- Order: Myrtales
- Family: Myrtaceae
- Genus: Calytrix
- Species: C. simplex

Binomial name
- Calytrix simplex Lindl.

Synonyms
- Calycothrix simplex (Lindl.) Schauer; Calythrix simplex Benth. orth. var.

= Calytrix simplex =

Species of flowering plant

Calytrix simplex is a species of flowering plant in the myrtle family Myrtaceae and is endemic to the south-west of Western Australia. It is a shrub with hairy branchlets, linear to oblong leaves and purple flowers with about 25 to 50 stamens in several rows.

== Description ==
Calytrix simplex is a shrub that typically grows to a height of 50 cm (20 in) and has branchlets covered with soft hairs. Its leaves are linear to oblong, 1.5–10 mm (0.059–0.394 in) long and 0.6–1 mm (0.024–0.039 in) wide on a petiole 0.2–1 mm (0.0079–0.0394 in) long, with stipules up to 0.25 mm (0.0098 in) long at the base of the petiole. The flowers are on a narrowly funnel-shaped peduncle 4–8.5 mm (0.16–0.33 in) long with egg-shaped lobes 2.0–4.5 mm (0.079–0.177 in) long. The floral tube is spindle-shaped, 4.5–9.5 mm (0.18–0.37 in) long and has ten ribs. The sepals are more or less round to egg-shaped, 1.25–2.0 mm (0.049–0.079 in) long, 1.25–8 mm (0.049–0.315 in) wide with an awn up to 10 mm (0.39 in) long. The petals are purple, sometimes with a yellow base and there are about 25 to 50 stamens with purple filaments in two or three rows. Flowering time depends on subspecies.

== Taxonomy ==
Calytrix simplex was first formally described in 1839 by John Lindley in his A Sketch of the Vegetation of the Swan River Colony. The specific epithet (simplex) means 'simple', hence 'not divided' referring to the stems.

In 1987, Lyndley Craven described Calytrix simplex subsp. suboppositifolia in the journal Brunonia, and that name, and that of the autonym are accepted by the Australian Plant Census:

- Calytrix simplex Lindl. subsp. simplex (the autonym) has leaf blades that are 4–10 mm (0.16–0.39 in) long, petals that are broadly lance-shaped and flowers in October and November.
- Calytrix simplex subsp. suboppositifolia Craven has leaf blades that are 1.5–6 mm (0.059–0.236 in) long, petals that are elliptic and flowers in November and December.

== Distribution and habitat ==
Calytrix simplex subsp. simplex grows on the Darling Range and subsp. oppositifolia grows in heath on sand with lateritic gravel on sand plains between the Pingelly-Wagin Lake districts and the Newdegate district.

== Conservation status ==
Subspecies simplex is listed as "Priority One" by the Government of Western Australia Department of Biodiversity, Conservation and Attractions, meaning that it is known from only one or a few locations where it is potentially at risk. but subsp. oppositifolia is listed as "not threatened".
