= Beeliar Regional Park =

Regional park in Perth, Western Australia

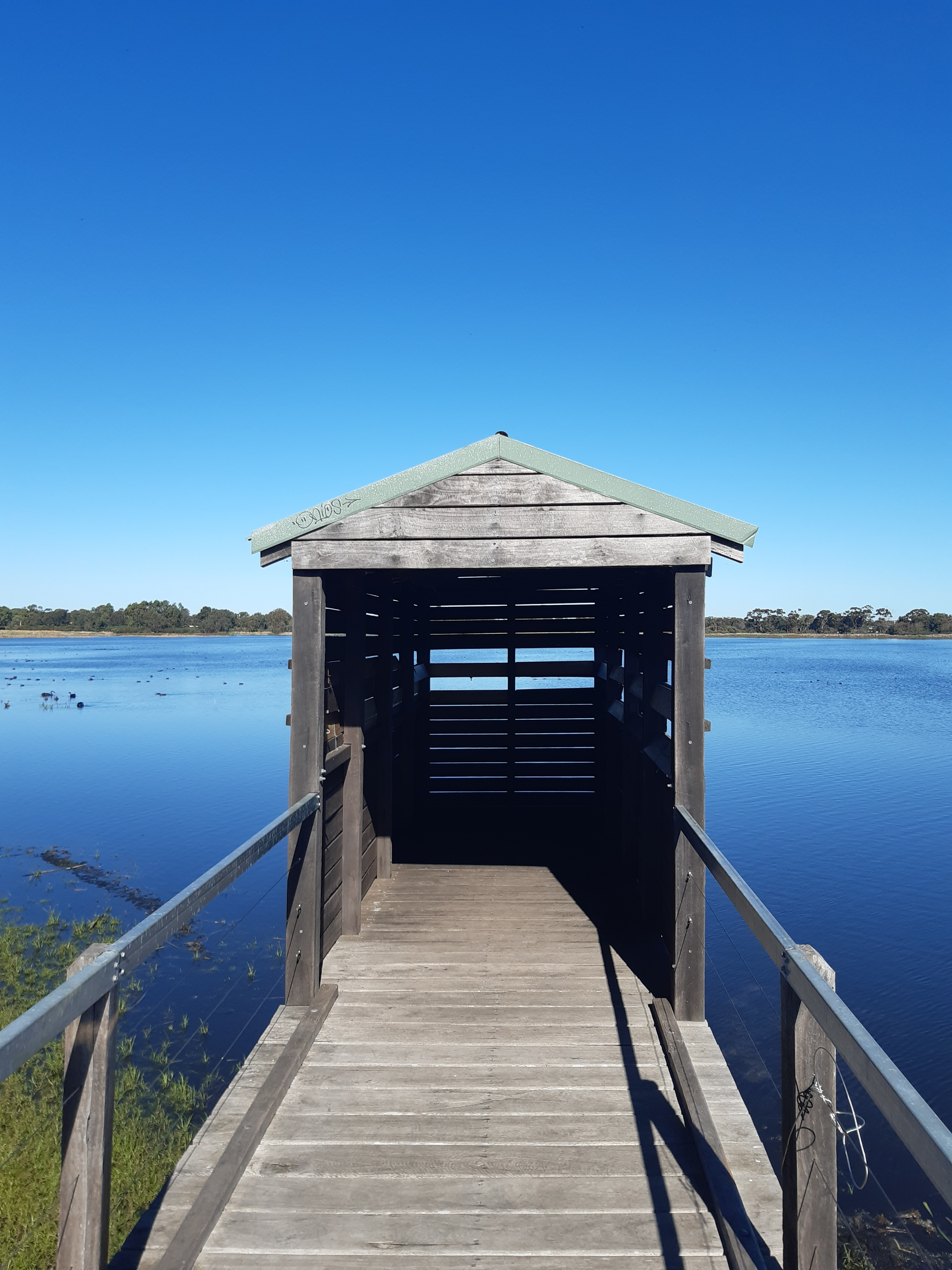
- Bird hide at Bibra Lake
- Interactive map of Beeliar Regional Park
- Type: Regional park
- Location: Cockburn; Kwinana; Melville
- Coordinates: 32°10′03″S 115°49′57″E
- Area: 3,171 ha (7,840 acres)
- Established: 17 January 1995
- Administrator: Department of Biodiversity, Conservation & Attractions
- Website: exploreparks.dbca.wa.gov.au/park/beeliar-regional-park

Commonwealth Heritage List
- Official name: Beeliar Regional Park
- Type: Interim list (Natural)
- Designated: 24 June 1997
- Reference no.: 14862

Beeliar Regional Park is a conservation park approximately 19 kilometres (12 mi) south of the Perth central business district, Western Australia, located within the cities of Cockburn, Kwinana and Melville. The regional park is named after the indigenous Beeliar people of the area.

In Western Australia, regional parks consist of areas of land that have been identified as having outstanding conservation, landscape and recreation values. The park contains remnants of the Beeliar Wetlands, part of the once widespread Swan Coastal Plain.

Beeliar is one of eleven regional parks in the Perth region of Western Australia. The purpose of these regional parks is to serve as urban havens to preserve and restore cultural heritage and valuable ecosystems as well as to encourage sustainable nature-based recreation activities.

== History ==
The concept of regional spaces in Western Australia open to the public was first proposed in 1955, when the Stephenson-Hepburn Report recommended preserving private land for future public use in what would become the Perth Metropolitan Region in 1963. The Environmental Protection Authority (EPA) identified areas of significant conservation, landscape and recreation value in a report in 1983. In 1989, the State Government allocated the responsibility of managing regional parks to the Department of Conservation & Land Management.

A Regional Parks Taskforce was established in 1990 but the EPA reported in 1993 that the establishment of these parks encountered difficulties. Beeliar Regional Park was gazetted in the Government Gazette on 17 January 1995.

In the late 1990s, there was a plan to realign Cockburn Road the park. After objections from local residents the plan was scrapped.

== Cultural heritage ==
The area of the Beeliar Regional Park, with its freshwater lakes, was an important camping area and source of food for the Beeliar clan of the Whadjuk people from the Noongar nation. A major trade route connecting the Swan and Murray River passed through the wetlands of what is now Beeliar Regional Park. A number of Aboriginal heritage sites have been identified within the park and the area continues to be of spiritual importance to the local indigenous people.

European settlement of the area was slow because large tracts of land in the area were unsuitable for farming and initial attempts to establish a town in the 1830s failed. By the 1920s, an extensive network of canals had been constructed to drain the wetlands for agricultural use.

== Areas ==
Beeliar Regional Park stretches from its northern-most point, Blue Gum Lake, 10 kilometres (6.2 mi) south of the CBD, to its southern extension, The Spectacles, 33 kilometres (21 mi) south of the CBD. It consists of 19 lakes, arranged in two chains. The smaller, western one is within 2 kilometres (1.2 mi) of the coast while the eastern, larger one is between 5 and 6 kilometres (3.1 and 3.7 mi) from the coast. The park also contains the Henderson coastal limestone cliffs.

=== Eastern chain ===
The main areas from north to south:

Image	Name	Suburb	Description	Co-ordinates
	Blue Gum Reserve	Mount Pleasant		32.03771°S 115.847662°E
	Booragoon Lake	Booragoon		32.0444°S 115.8427°E
	Piney Lakes	Winthrop		32.048673°S 115.837744°E
	North Lake	North Lake		32.07778°S 115.8250°E
	Bibra Lake	Bibra Lake		32.091108°S 115.824257°E
	South Lake	Bibra Lake		32.103889°S 115.818611°E
	Cocos Reserve	Bibra Lake		32.108277°S 115.822918°E
	Little Rush Lake	Yangebup		32.110278°S 115.825278°E
	Yangebup Lake	Yangebup		32.1183°S 115.8300°E
	Kogolup Lake	Beeliar		32.135833°S 115.830833°E
	Branch Circus Wetland	Beeliar		32.137497°S 115.840023°E
	Thomsons Lake	Beeliar	Important wetland, fenced in to keep out vermin Home to the endangered Southern brown bandicoot (Isoodon obesulus)	32.1500°S 115.8290°E
	Banganup Lake	Wattleup	Located inside the fenced in Harry Waring Marsupial Reserve	32.165274°S 115.827041°E
	The Spectacles	The Spectacles	Contains an Aboriginal Heritage Trail and the Biara Boardwalk Trail, which leads to a bird hide	32.2150°S 115.8339°E

=== Western chain ===
The main areas from north to south:

Image	Name	Suburb	Description	Co-ordinates
	Manning Lake	Hamilton Hill Spearwood	Site of the heritage listed Azelia Ley Homestead	32.0925°S 115.7719°E
	Market Garden Swamp 1	Spearwood		32.112294°S 115.778963°E
	Market Garden Swamp 2	Lake Coogee		32.125030°S 115.780264°E
	Lake Coogee	Lake Coogee		32.1350°S 115.7767°E
	Brownman Swamps	Henderson		32.165128°S 115.787342°E
	Lake Mount Brown	Henderson		32.173333°S 115.789833°E
	Mount Brown	Henderson & Naval Base	Contains a lookout with views of the surrounding areas and Cockburn Sound	32.1817°S 115.7833°E
	Henderson Foreshore	Henderson & Naval Base	Contains a lookout and a short cliff top walk Offers views of Garden Island and Carnac Island	32.173330°S 115.772125°E
