= North Lake (Western Australia) =

Lake in Perth, Western Australia

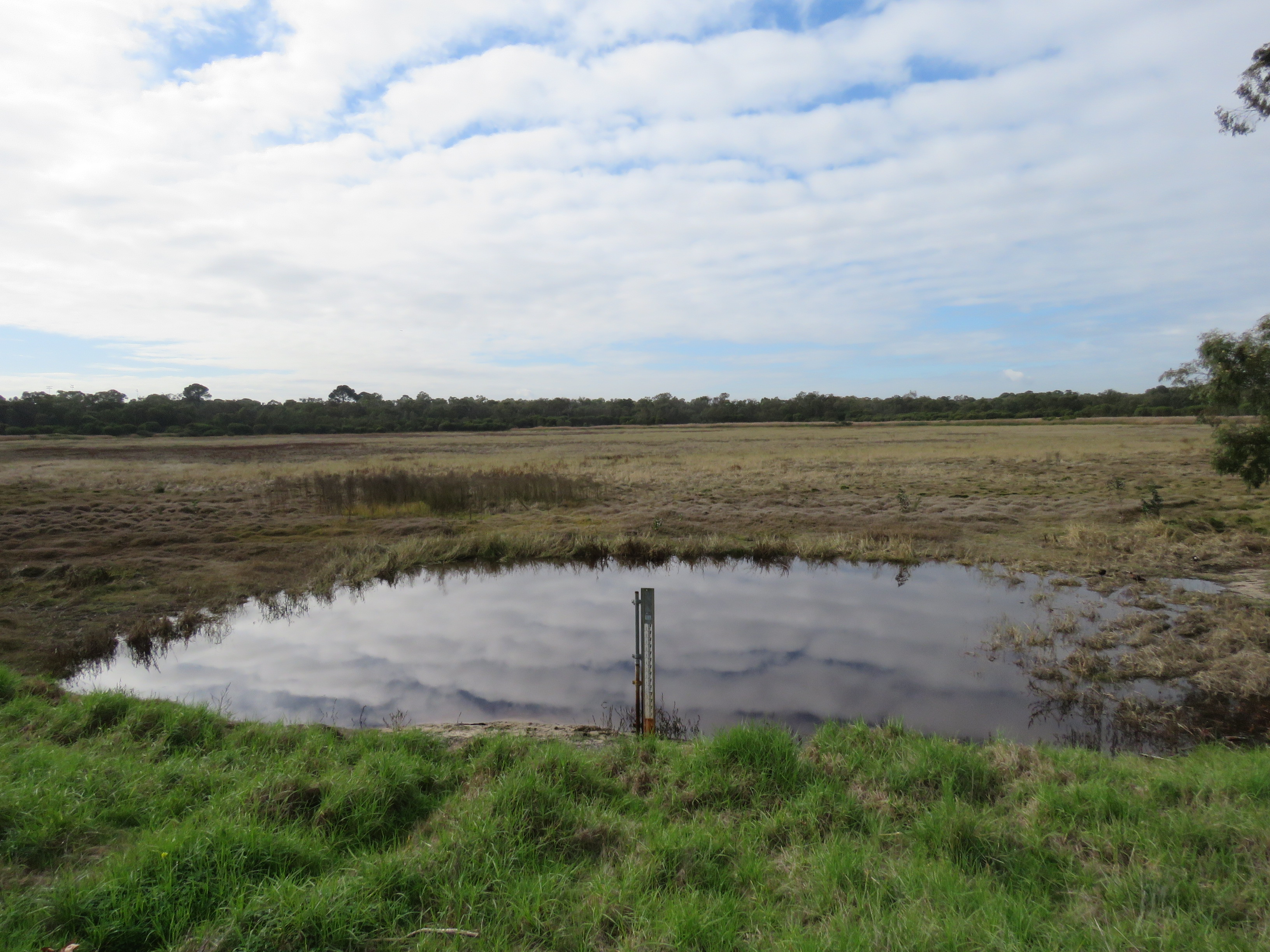
- North Lake seen from the north-west in June 2021

- Location within Perth
- Interactive map of North Lake
- Location: Perth, Western Australia
- Coordinates: 32°04′40″S 115°49′30″E
- Type: Freshwater
- Basin countries: Australia
- Designation: Beeliar Regional Park

North Lake (Nyungar: Coolbellup) is a freshwater lake in the suburb of North Lake, 18 kilometres (11 mi) south of the central business district of Perth, the capital of Western Australia, and 8 kilometres (5 mi) from the Indian Ocean. The suburb and lake are located within the City of Cockburn local government area.

It is part of the northernmost lake within a chain of lakes which make up the Beeliar Regional Park (North Lake, Bibra Lake, South Lake, Booragoon Lake, Yangebup Lake, and Thomsons Lake). The lake has been known by this name since 1877, and the name was approved for the suburb in 1954.

== See also ==
- List of lakes of Australia § Western Australia
