= Manning Lake =

Lake in Perth, Western Australia

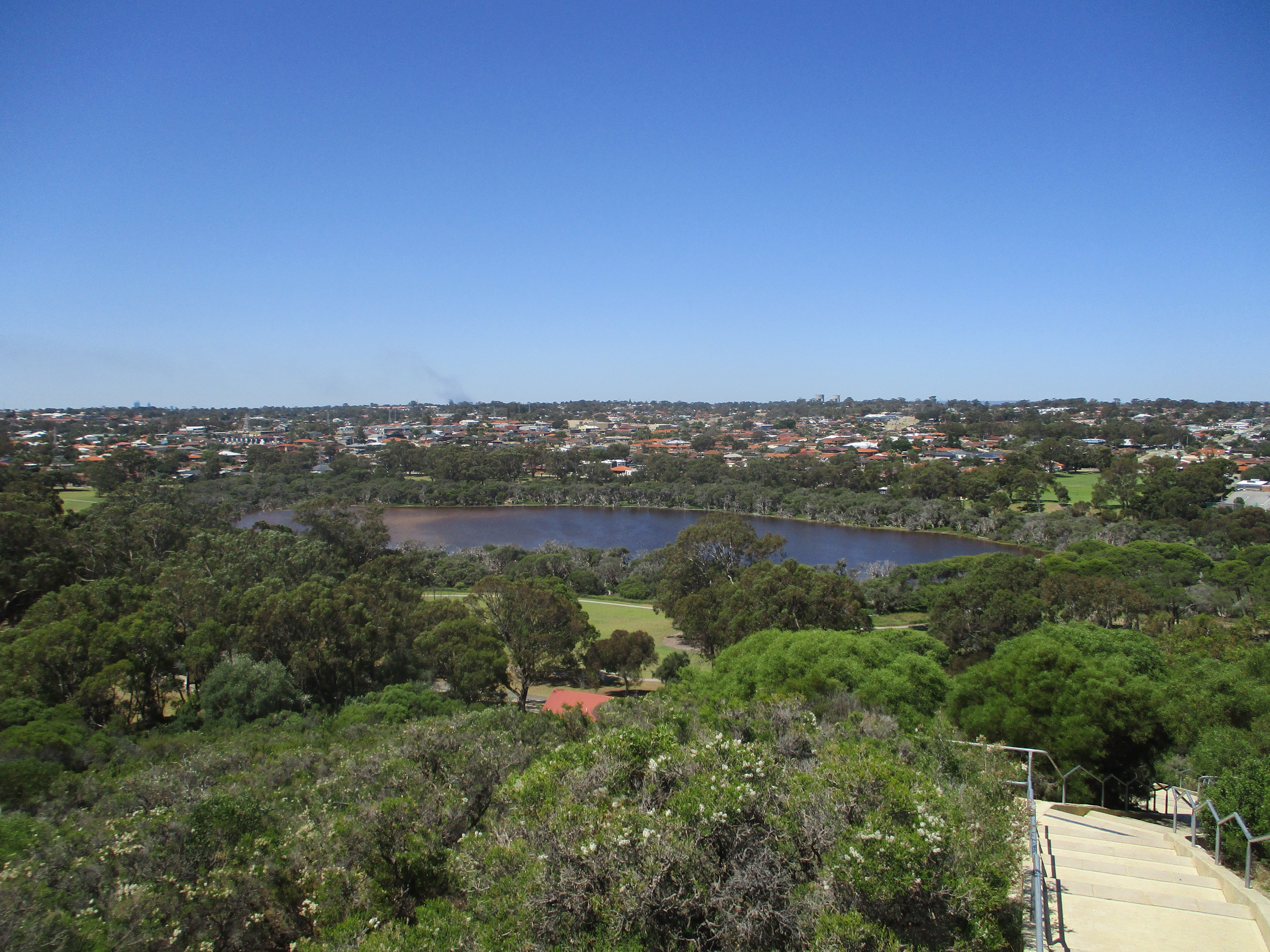
- Manning Lake seen from the eastern lookout

- Location within Australia
- Interactive map of Manning Lake
- Location: Hamilton Hill and Spearwood, Western Australia
- Coordinates: 32°05′33″S 115°46′19″E
- Basin countries: Australia
- Designation: Beeliar Regional Park
- Surface area: 6 ha (15 acres)

Manning Lake is a freshwater lake in the suburbs of Hamilton Hill and Spearwood, 18 kilometres (11 mi) south-west of the central business district of Perth, the capital of Western Australia. It is located within Manning Park, which is part of Beeliar Regional Park.

== Overview ==
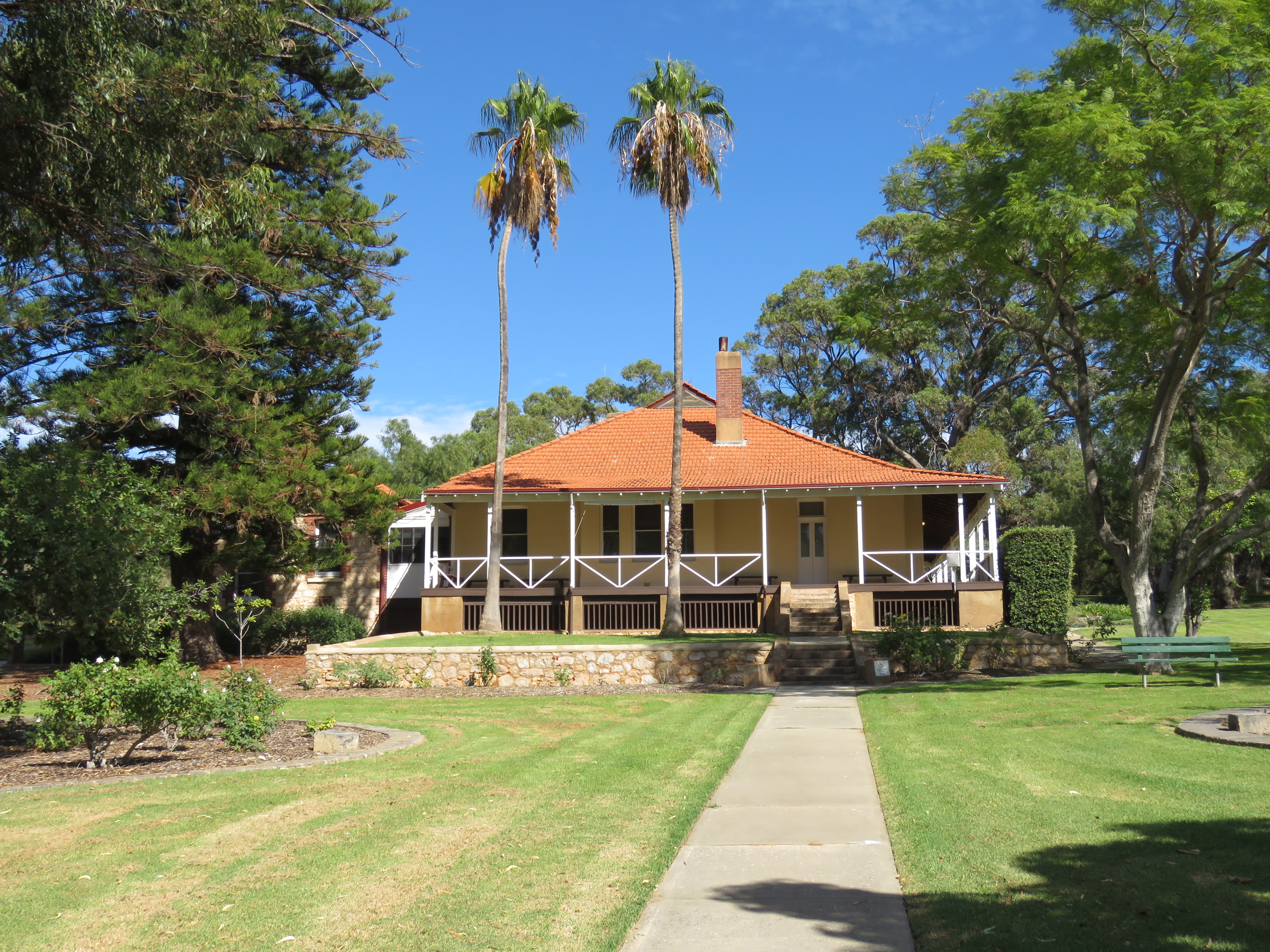
The Azelia Ley Homestead Museum in 2021

In the local Nyungar language, the lake was originally called Dgilgie's Lake, which was altered to Devil's Lake by early European settlers, the Manning family and, in turn, changed in pronunciation again to Davilak Lake by the local Aboriginal people.

Lucius Manning built an early homestead north of the lake in the 1850s, and a subsequent one, Davilak House, west of the lake. The latter was constructed by convict labour in 1866 and abandoned after the Second World War and burned down in the 1950s, with the remnants still visible today.

Manning constructed another house, for his daughter Azelia Ley, on the west side of the lake, north of Davilak House, which is now the state heritage listed Azelia Ley Homestead, a museum.

The vegetation around the lake consists of some large tuart trees and swamp paper bark, something now quite rare in the City of Cockburn.

West of the lake lies Manning Ridge, which has a number of lookouts accessible by stairs.
