= Yangebup Lake =

Lake in Perth, Western Australia

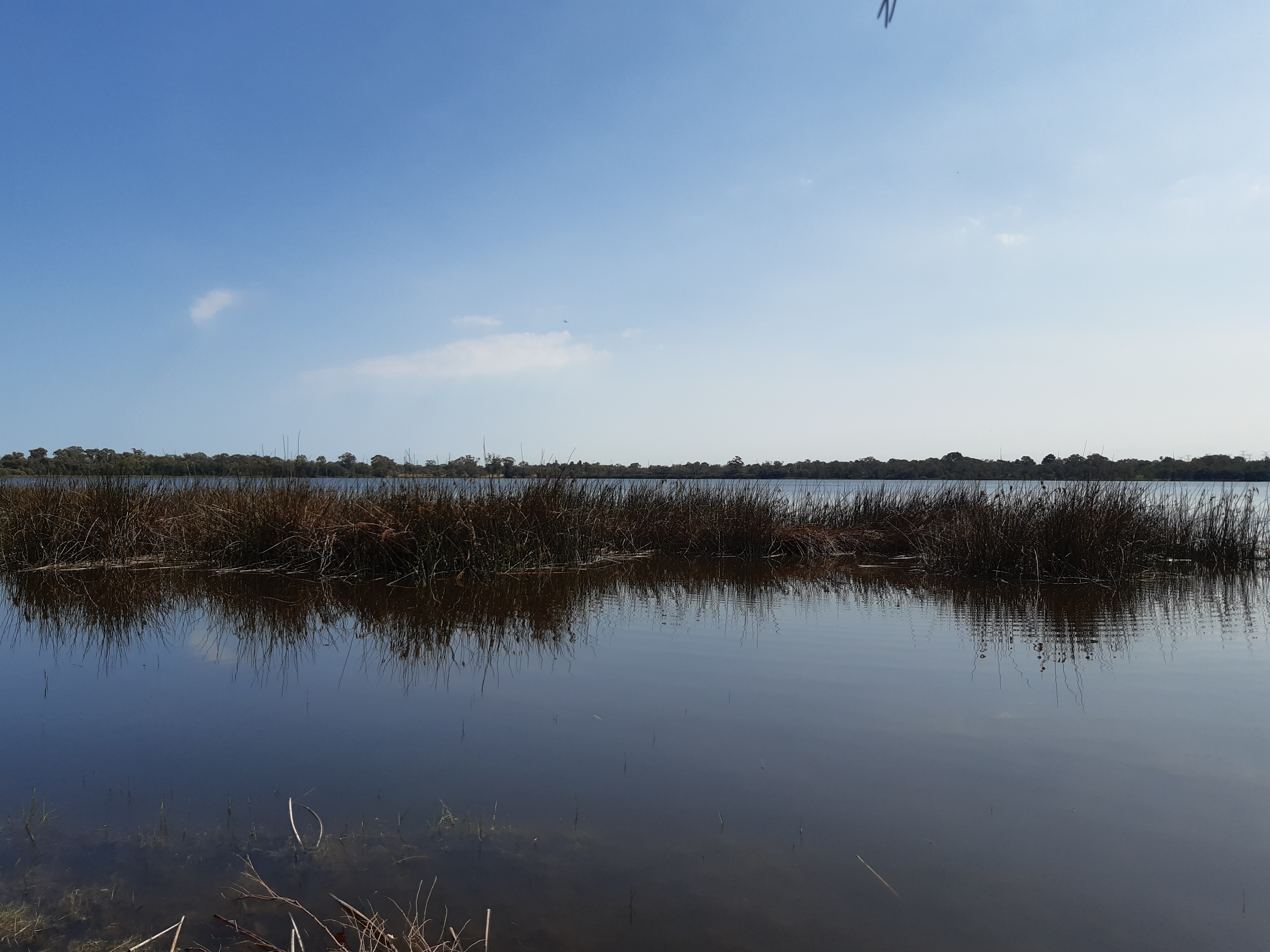
- Yangebup Lake seen from the southern shore in October 2020

- Location within Australia
- Interactive map of Yangebup Lake
- Location: Yangebup
- Coordinates: 32°07′06″S 115°49′48″E
- Basin countries: Australia
- Designation: Beeliar Regional Park
- Surface area: 77 ha (190 acres)

Yangebup Lake is a freshwater lake in the suburb of Yangebup, 18 kilometres (11 mi) south-west of the central business district of Perth, the capital of Western Australia. It is part of Beeliar Regional Park.

== Overview ==
Yangebup Lake's name is derived from the Noongar word for the locally-growing bullrush (Typha domingensis), yanget. The lake and its name were first recorded by European settlers in 1841 while the suburb of Yangebup officially received its name in 1977.

The area surrounding the lake historically served as camping, gathering and hunting grounds for the local Wadjuk people of the Noongar nation, who are estimated to have lived in the area for 40,000 years. The wetlands of Beeliar Regional Park were highly important to the local indigenous population as a source of both food and water. North Lake Road, which passes the lake to the north-east, follows what formerly was an important track connecting what is now the area of Fremantle with the land to the east. Yangebup Lake continues to be of mythological, historical and ceremonial importance to the local indigenous people and is a registered site of Aboriginal cultural significance.

European settlement of the area commenced in the 1880s, when land grants were made to a number of settlers who proceeded to use the land for the grazing of sheep and cows, for poultry and pig farming and also for cropping. The wider area became known as the Jandakot Agricultural Area. Large scale farming was gradually abandoned in favour of market gardens because of the poor soil in the area, which required fertilising to be productive. When this also declined in the early 1920s, the short-lived Baldivis tramway was built south of the lake to connect Jandakot railway station to the Peel Estate, part of a Group Settlement Scheme further south in what is now the City of Rockingham. The tramway was dismantled again in 1925.

In the 1920s, a wool scouring industry was established on the eastern shore of the lake, taking advantage of the fresh water the lake provided. The Jandakot Wool Scouring Co., as the enterprise was known, operated for 70 years at the location, resulting in ongoing pollution issues from its discharge, with lead, chromium and arsenic having been found in the lake sediment. The limited agricultural use of the land still present declined further and, from the 1970s, some of the area around the lake was set aside for conservation while new suburbs in the area were created from the 1980s. The Jandakot Wool Scouring Co., which it became known as from 1938, began operations in 1927. It originally operated out of non-permanent facilities, with changing configurations according to demand. From 1972, the facility was modernised and became more permanent. In the mid-1980s, the environmental impact of the facility came under increased scrutiny and, in the late 1990s operations moved to East Rockingham, was rebranded as Jandakot Wool Washing Pty Ltd, and the old facility was demolished.

Storm water run off from the new built up areas caused the lake's water level to rise through the inflow of untreated water, causing damage to the surrounding vegetation. As a remedy, the South Jandakot Drainage Scheme was implemented in 1995, which allowed for the regulation of the lake's water level by discharging water to the water treatment facility at Woodman Point.

The lake continues to suffer from inflows of nitrogen and phosphorus through fertiliser runoff from surrounding agriculture and suburban gardens, causing it to be hyper-eutrophic. This causes algae blooms in the lake and, as a knock-on effect, allows large numbers of midges to breed, with attempts made to stop this cycle. To this end, the City of Cockburn, the local government area the lake is located in, constructed nutrient stripping treatment trains on the eastern shore of the lake in 2016, which achieved only very limited success.
