= Parkeyerring Lake =

Lake in Western Australia

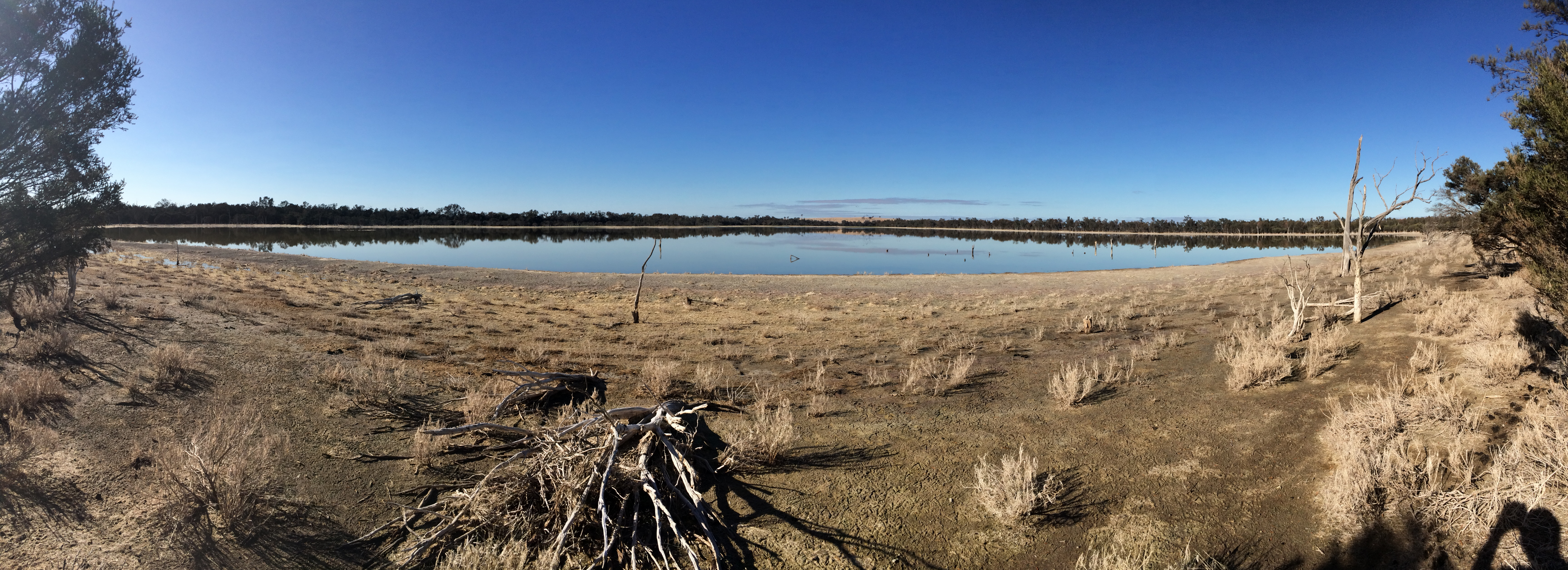
- Parkeyerring Lake 2018

- Location in Western Australia
- Interactive map of Parkeyerring Lake
- Location: Wheatbelt, Western Australia
- Coordinates: 33°22′04″S 117°20′48″E
- Type: saline
- Primary inflows: Groundwater and surface runoff
- Basin countries: Australia
- Surface area: 322 ha (800 acres)
- Average depth: 0.86 m (2 ft 10 in)
- Surface elevation: 247 m (810 ft)

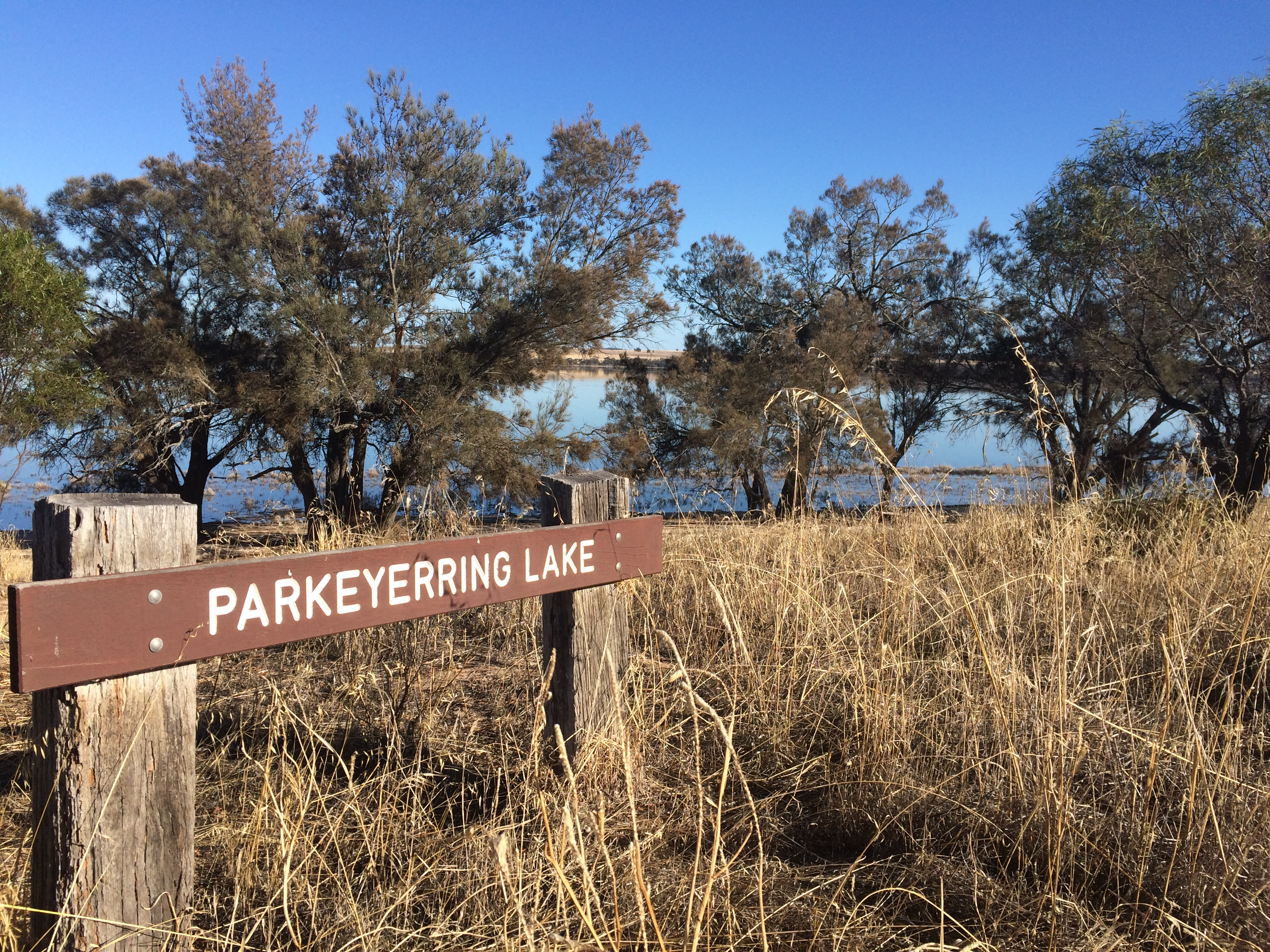
Parkeyerring Lake sign near Wait-Jen trail 2018

Parkeyerring Lake is an ephemeral salt lake in the Wheatbelt region of Western Australia, approximately 7 km (4.3 mi) south of the town of Wagin and about 235 km (146 mi) southeast of Perth. Much of the lake is surrounded by the 991 ha (2,450-acre) Parkeyerring Nature Reserve, which was gazetted in 1905 and expanded in 1957.

The area's traditional owners are the Noongar peoples in the Gnaala Karla Booja region (the Pindjarup, Wiilman and Ganeang dialectical groups). There are numerous Aboriginal sites throughout the shire, including around the lake.

== Description ==
The lake has a surface area of 322 ha (800 acres) and fills from a series of inflow channels from the southern and south western sides where Little Lake Parkeyerring is located. Shore seepage also occurs from shallow soils and rocky outcrops to the western side and the major outflow is through a channel along the north eastern side shore which discharges into the Coblinine River. Most of the catchment area has been cleared for agriculture.

The area receives an average rainfall of approximately 450 mm (18 in) per annum, while the average evaporation is approximately 1,700 mm (67 in) per annum. The landscape is made up of low hills, broad flats and gently undulating rises.

The lake is part of a chain of wetlands situated along major ancient drainage lines in the area that run from Dumbleyung in the north to south of Wagin. The Shire of Wagin contains many large lakes and wetlands, including western parts of Lake Dumbleyung, Lake Parkeyerring, Lake Little Parkeyerring, Lake Quarbing, Lake Norring, Lake Little Norring, Lake Gundaring and Wagin Lake. The lakes are part of the catchment system of the Blackwood River but as a result of the flat topography, low average rainfall and existence of an extensive network of salt lakes, the eastern creeks and rivers rarely contribute any flows to the river.

Early twentieth century Wagin and nearby residents utilised the lake and surrounds for picnics.

The Wait-Jen trail, a 10.5 km (6.5 mi) walking trail, passes by the side of the lake and finishes at Norring Lake to the south west. Wait-Jen means emu’s foot print in the local Noongar language; the trail follows an ancient dreamtime track taken by the Wagyl. The trail was opened in 2003 and features interpretive signage and information panels.

== Flora ==
Around the fringes of the lake there is a narrow belt of vegetation, composed mostly of an Eucalyptus loxophleba overstorey with an understorey of Acacia acuminata on the eastern side. The western bank has a woodland dominated by Casuarina obesa, while Melaleuca halmaturorum is found on the northern fringe. Samphire, Halosarcia lepidosperma and species of Sarcocornia are found on the low-lying margins of the lake.

== Fauna ==
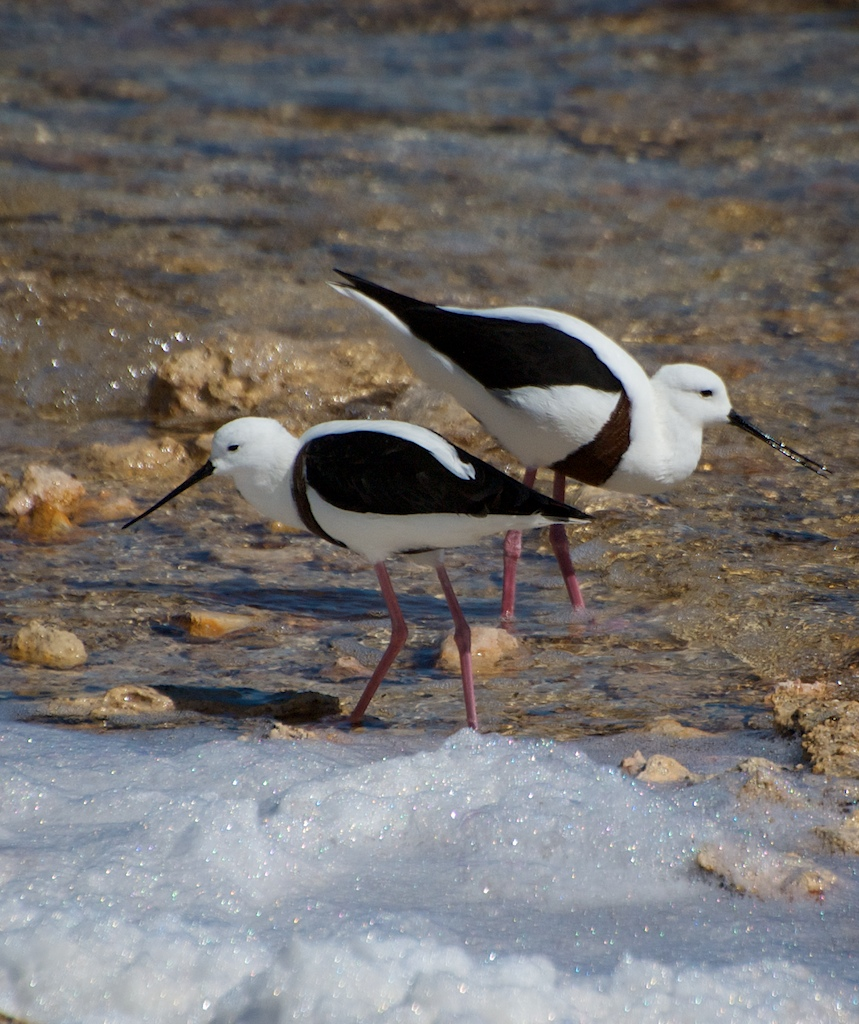
Banded stilts

Eighteen species of waterbird have been recorded around the lake, including the salt tolerant Australian shelduck and the banded stilt, which were both numerous. There was also a large number of silver gulls, thought to be a result of the proximity of the lake to a waste disposal site. Species with much smaller populations include black swan, black-winged stilt, curlew sandpiper, eurasian coot, grey teal, hooded plover, pacific black duck, pink-eared duck, red-capped plover, hoary-headed grebe, white-faced heron, australasian shoveler and red-necked stint.

Six species of crustacean have been found in the lake, including Australocypris insularis, Diacypris compacta and Platycypris baueri. Three species of insect have been recorded, including Necterosoma penicillatus and a species of Tanytarsus.

The endangered red-tailed phascogale has been recorded in the nature reserve.

== See also ==
- List of lakes of Australia § Western Australia
