= Wagin Lake =

Lake in Western Australia

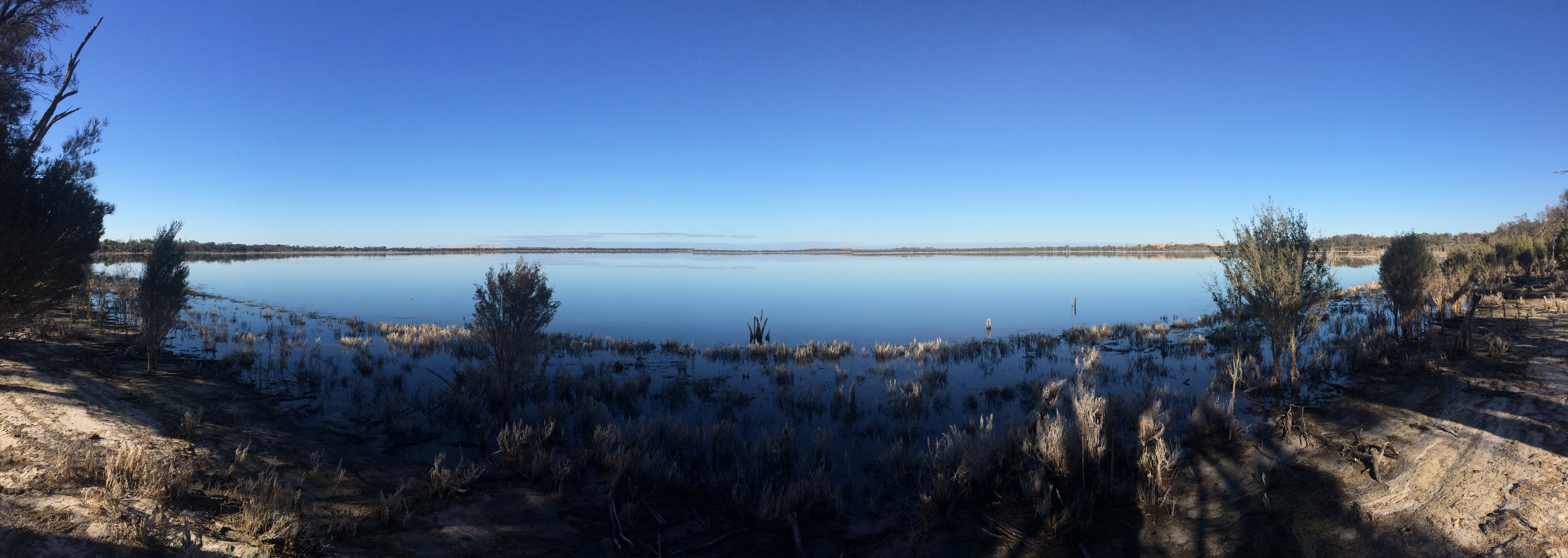
- Wagin Lake panorama 2018

- Location in Western Australia
- Interactive map of Wagin Lake
- Location: Wheatbelt, Western Australia
- Coordinates: 33°19′35″S 117°20′50″E
- Type: saline
- Primary inflows: Groundwater and surface runoff
- Catchment area: 2,300 ha (5,700 acres)
- Basin countries: Australia
- Surface area: 46 to 63 ha (110 to 160 acres)

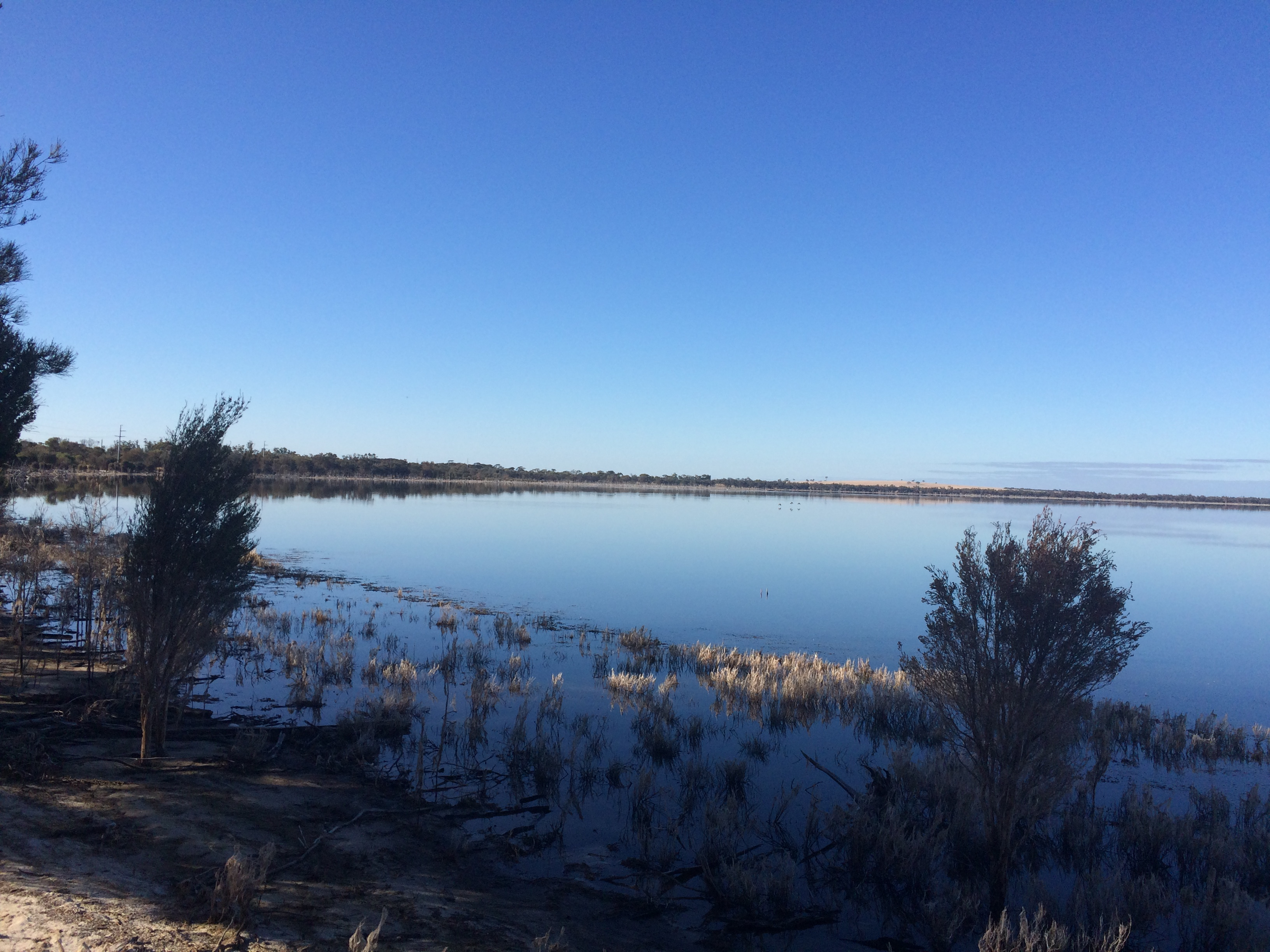
Wagin Lake southern shore 2018

Wagin Lake is a usually dry salt lake in the Wheatbelt region of Western Australia located on the southern edge of the town of Wagin and about 228 km (142 mi) south east of Perth. The lake is bordered on the western side by the Wagin Lake Nature Reserve, which occupies an area of 1.14 km^{2} (0.44 sq mi).

The traditional owners of the area are the Noongar peoples in the Gnaala Karla Booja region (the Pindjarup, Wiilman and Ganeang dialectical groups). There are a number of Aboriginal sites throughout the shire, including around the lake.

The lake's name is of Noongar origin, and was first recorded by a surveyor in 1869-72. It means "place of emus", or "site of the foot tracks from when the emu sat down". The town takes its name from the lake.

The lake is part of a chain of wetlands situated along major ancient drainage lines in the area that run from Dumbleyung in the north to south of Wagin. The Shire of Wagin contains many large lakes and wetlands, including western parts of Lake Dumbleyung, Parkeyerring Lake, Lake Little Parkeyerring, Lake Quarbing, Lake Norring, Lake Little Norring, Lake Gundaring and Lake Wagin. The lakes are part of the catchment system of the Blackwood River but as a result of the flat topography, low average rainfall and existence of an extensive network of salt lakes, the eastern creeks and rivers rarely contribute any flows to the river.

The 2,300 ha (5,700-acre) catchment area has an average rainfall of 433 mm (17.0 in) per annum and an evaporation rate of 1,873 mm (73.7 in) per annum. The landscape is a mixture of alluvial plains, dunes, small lunettes and swales found over alluvial and aeolian deposits.

In February 2017 floods filled the lake to capacity; it remained filled through to the following year, attracting large flocks of black swans, egrets and ducks.

When the lake contains water it acts as habitat for many species, including grey teal, pacific black duck, eurasian coot, hoary-headed grebe, pied stilts, white-faced heron, great egret and yellow-billed spoonbill.

== See also ==
- List of lakes of Australia § Western Australia
