= Lake Perkolilli =

Lake in Western Australia

- Location in Western Australia
- Interactive map of Lake Perkolilli
- Coordinates: 30.573°S 121.711°E
- Basin countries: Australia

Lake Perkolilli is an ephemeral lake in the Goldfields-Esperance region of Western Australia.

== Description ==
Lake Perkolilli is a clay pan. It was the location of racing of motorcycles and cars in the 1920s and 1930, and of Silver Wings races in the 1930s.

Despite the relocation of motor racing to other locations in Western Australia, racing at the lake bed was restarted in 2019 under the name Lake Perkolilli Red Dust Revival, following a trial event in 2014. Further Revival events have since been held in 2022 and 2025.

== See also ==
- List of lakes of Australia § Western Australia
