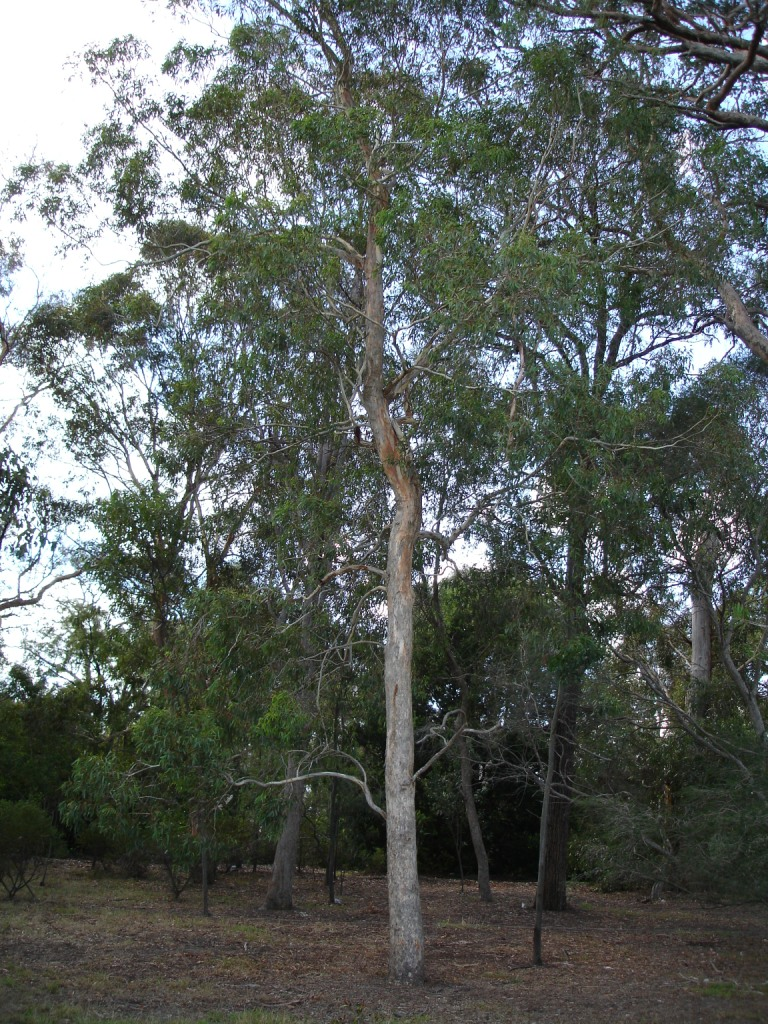
- Eucalyptus rudis in Maranoa Gardens

Conservation status
- Near Threatened (IUCN 3.1)

Scientific classification
- Kingdom: Plantae
- Clade: Tracheophytes
- Clade: Angiosperms
- Clade: Eudicots
- Clade: Rosids
- Order: Myrtales
- Family: Myrtaceae
- Genus: Eucalyptus
- Species: E. rudis

Binomial name
- Eucalyptus rudis Endl.
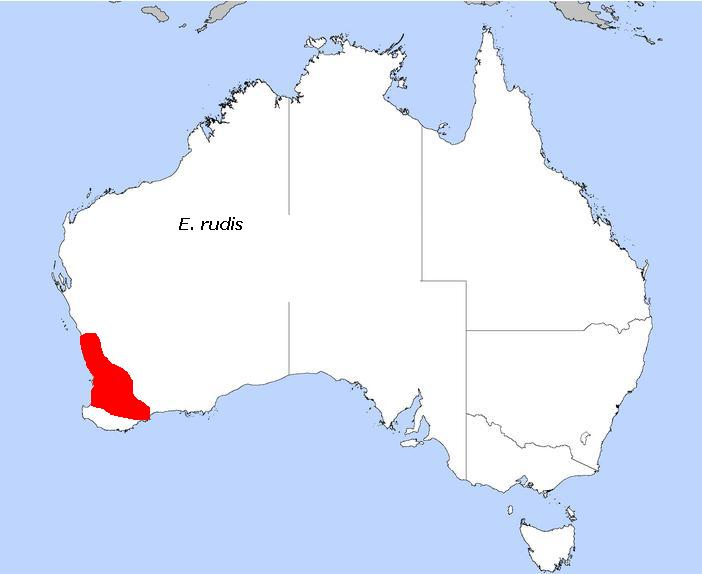
- E. rudis, field distribution

Synonyms
- Eucalyptus brachypoda Turcz.

= Eucalyptus rudis =

Flooded gum, moitch

Species of eucalyptus

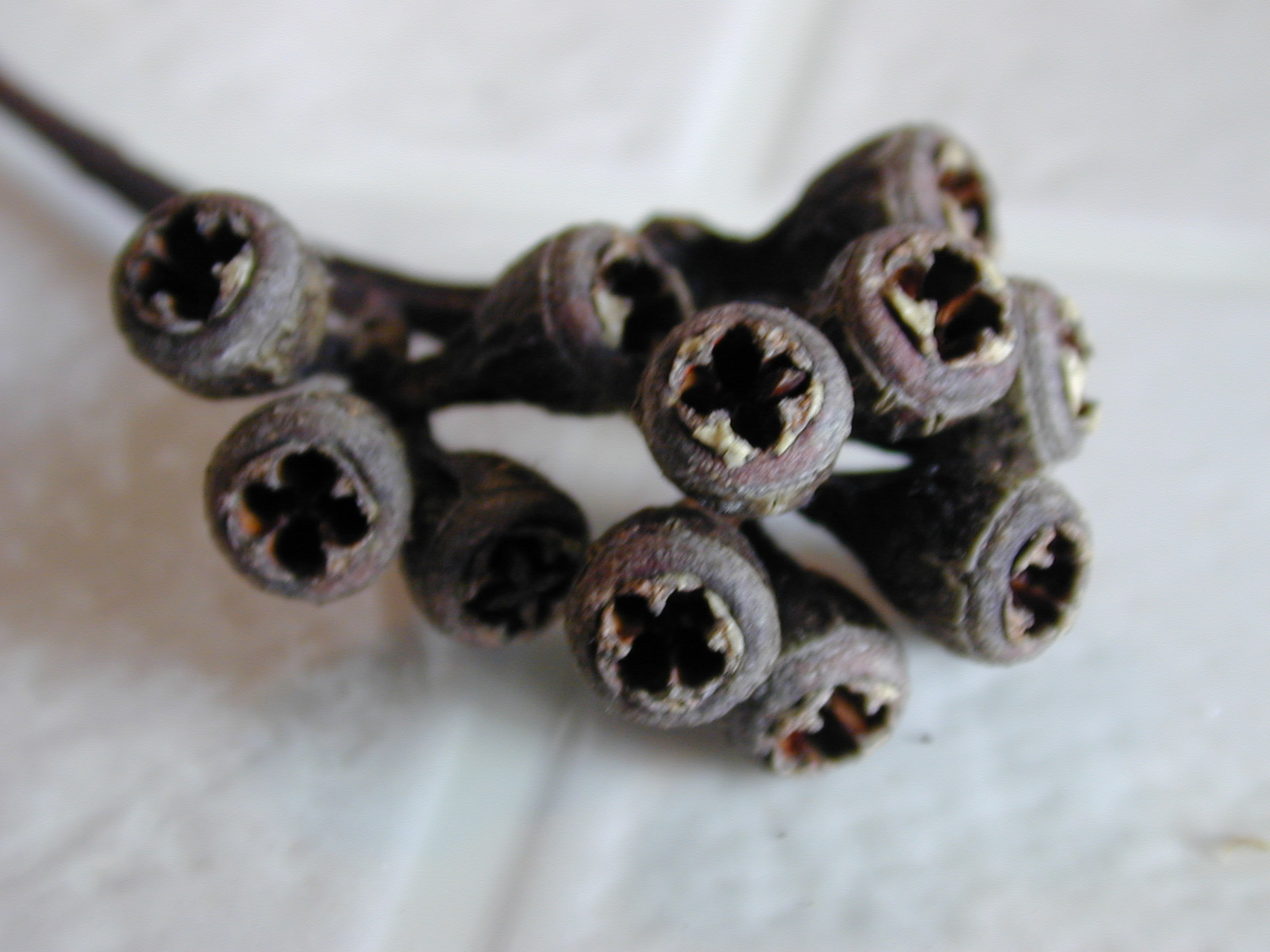
E. rudis fruit

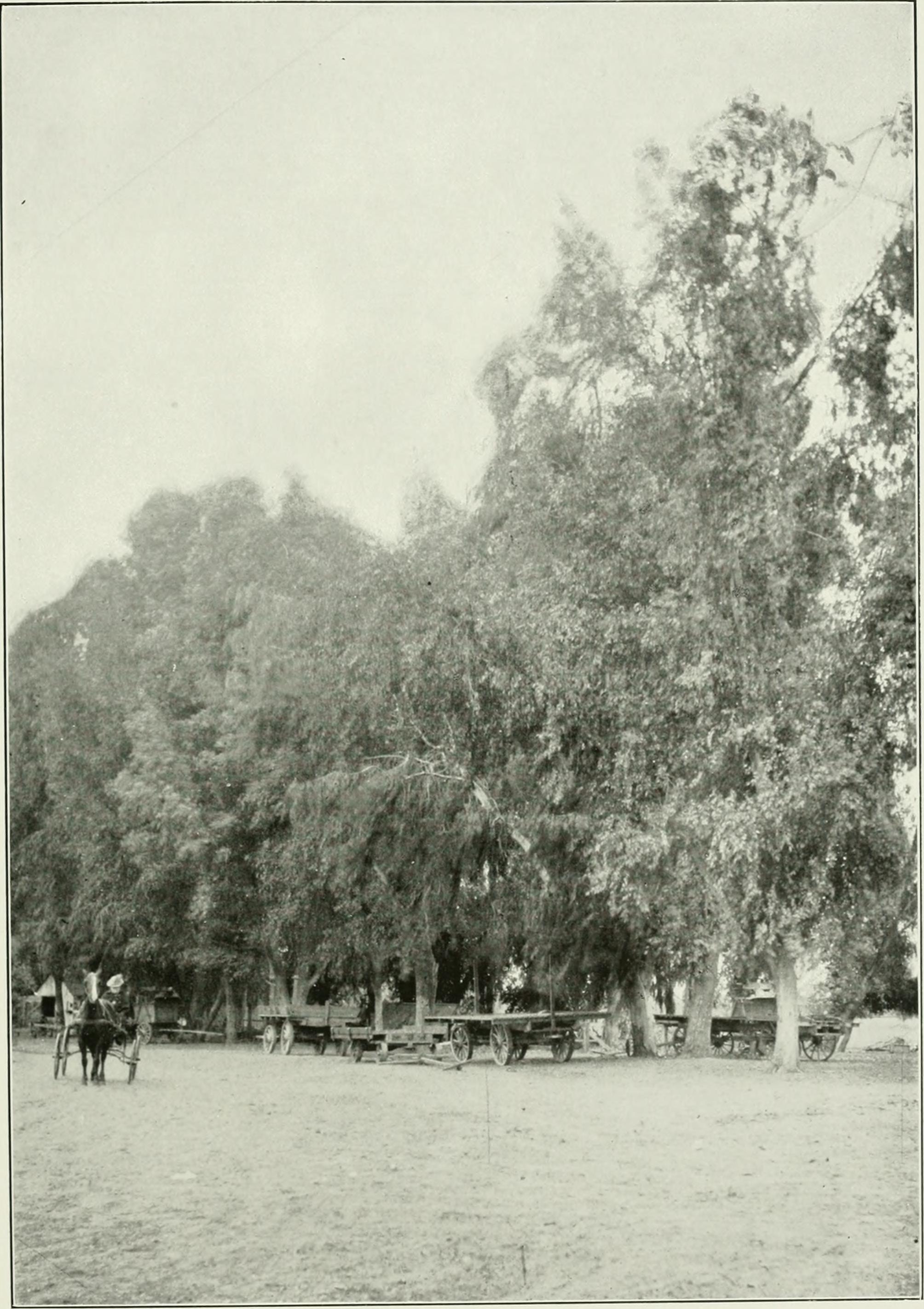
E. rudis cultivated in the United States (1902)

Eucalyptus rudis, commonly known as flooded gum or moitch, is a species of small to medium-sized tree endemic to coastal areas near Perth, Western Australia. The Noongar names for the tree are colaille, gooloorto, koolert and moitch. This tree has rough, fibrous bark on the trunk and large branches, smooth greyish bark above, lance-shaped to curved adult leaves, flower buds in groups of between seven and eleven, white flowers and bell-shaped, cup-shaped or hemispherical fruit.

== Description ==
Eucalyptus rudis is a tree that typically grows to a height of 5–20 m (16–66 ft) and forms a lignotuber. The trunk is usually short and has a poor form with a wide-spreading crown. It has rough, dark and light grey box-style bark on the trunk and larger branches, smooth greyish bark above. Young plants and coppice regrowth have stems that are square in cross-section and dull greyish green, egg-shaped to more or less round leaves that are 25–70 mm (0.98–2.76 in) long and 20–65 mm (0.79–2.56 in) wide. Adult leaves are arranged alternately, lance-shaped to curved, 70–180 mm (2.8–7.1 in) long and 10–35 mm (0.39–1.38 in) wide, tapering to a petiole 13–30 mm (0.51–1.18 in) wide. The flower buds are arranged in leaf axils in groups of seven, nine or eleven on an unbranched peduncle 4–20 mm (0.16–0.79 in) long, the individual buds on pedicels 1–8 mm (0.039–0.315 in) long. Mature buds are oval to diamond-shaped, 8–12 mm (0.31–0.47 in) long and 4–7 mm (0.16–0.28 in) wide conical operculum. Flowering mainly occurs from July to November and the flowers are white. The fruit is a woody, bell-shaped, cup-shaped or hemispherical capsule 4–7 mm (0.16–0.28 in) long and 7–10 mm (0.28–0.39 in) wide with the valves protruding strongly.

North of Perth, E. rudis intergrades with Eucalyptus camaldulensis var. obtusa so the bark may be smooth and very similar to Eucalyptus camaldulensis.

== Taxonomy and naming ==
Eucalyptus rudis was first formally described in 1837 by Stephan Endlicher in Enumeratio plantarum quas in Novae Hollandiae ora austro-occidentali ad fluvium Cygnorum et in sinu Regis Georgii collegit Carolus Liber Baro de Hügel authored by Endlicher, Eduard Fenzl, George Bentham and Heinrich Wilhelm Schott from samples collected by Charles von Hügel around the Swan River Colony.

In 1993, Ian Brooker and Stephen Hopper described two subspecies and the names have been accepted by the Australian Plant Census:

- Eucalyptus rudis subsp. cratyantha Brooker and Hopper has buds up to 15 mm (0.59 in) long and fruit up to 14 mm (0.55 in) wide;
- Eucalyptus rudis Endl. subsp. rudis has buds up to 12 mm (0.47 in) long and fruit up to 9 mm (0.35 in) wide.

== Distribution and habitat ==
The tree is widespread from the Eneabba district (29° S. Lat.) southwards in the Darling Range, west central wheatbelt and high rainfall areas of south-west Western Australia commonly on watercourses, swampy ground or very occasionally on granite rock. Subspecies cratyantha only occurs from Mandurah and Pinjarra south and south-west to Cape Naturaliste.

Flooded gum occurs typically in open woodlands, associated species include with wandoo, Corymbia calophylla and Eucalyptus marginata.

== Ecology ==
This tree is often heavily attacked in spring by insects, including leaf miners, leaf blister sawflies and lerps. The crown regenerates in late spring and into summer.

== Conservation status ==
Subspecies rudis is classified as "not threatened" in Western Australia by the Western Australian Government Department of Parks and Wildlife, but subspecies cratyantha is classified as "Priority Four" by the Government of Western Australia Department of Parks and Wildlife, meaning that is rare or near threatened. The IUCN Red List assesses the species as Near Threatened.

== Uses ==
The tree is relatively fast-growing with potential for remediation of land affected by moderate levels of salinity. Natural stands are used in the apiculture industry as a source of pollen producing a light amber honey. It is also being assessed as a fast-growing source of biomass for bioenergy and reconstituted wood products in the South West region. Historically it has been used as firewood but the wood also has potential for use as specialty timber. The heartwood is hard, cross grained and a yellow to light reddish brown colour. It has an air-dried density about 775 kg/m^{3}.
