= List of State Register of Heritage Places in the City of Cockburn =

List of heritage places in Western Australia

The State Register of Heritage Places is maintained by the Heritage Council of Western Australia. As of 2026, 141 places are heritage-listed in the City of Cockburn, of which 22 are on the State Register of Heritage Places.

== List ==
=== State Register of Heritage Places ===
The Western Australian State Register of Heritage Places, as of 2026, lists the following 22 state registered places within the City of Cockburn:

Place name	Place #	Location	Suburb or town	Co-ordinates	Built	State registered	Notes	Photo
Azelia Ley Homestead	533	Lot 9000 Glenister Road	Hamilton Hill	32°05′38″S 115°46′07″E	1866	22 June 2001	Also referred to as Manning Estate; Homestead residence with freestanding lavatories, a single roomed limestone building and stables, designed and built in the Victorian Regency style	
Channel Marker Obelisk	10163	Cockburn Road	Henderson	32°08′36″S 115°46′14″E	1872	3 June 2005	Also referred to as Channel Marker & Trigonometric Beacon; An 8-9 metre tall rendered limestone rubble obelisk	
Coogee Hotel	3648	371 Cockburn Road	Coogee	32°06′42″S 115°45′55″E	1898	14 May 2002	Also referred to as Coogee Progress Association, Old Coogee Hotel, Powell's Coogee Hotel, Swan Anglican Children's Home; Single storey hotel and purpose built post office from the pre-World War I period	
Coogee Hotel	24481	358 Cockburn Road	Coogee	32°06′42″S 115°45′55″E			Part of Coogee Hotel Precinct (3648)	
Coogee Post Office	24500	358 Cockburn Road	Coogee	32°06′42″S 115°45′55″E			Part of Coogee Hotel Precinct (3648)	
C. Y. O'Connor Statue	17006	South Beach	North Coogee	32°05′25″S 115°45′19″E	2001		Statue is of a man sitting astride an unsaddled horse in memory of C. Y. O'Connor who killed himself at South Beach	
Davilak House	511	Lot 164 Azelia Road	Spearwood	32°05′45″S 115°46′12″E	1866		Part of Azelia Ley Homestead Precinct (3648); Ruin of a set of large stone built buildings and structures forming the homestead	
Explosive Magazines	4626	Cockburn Road	Coogee	32°07′34″S 115°45′59″E	1941	27 December 2002	Also referred to as Woodman Point Munitions Magazines; A group of three single roomed brick buildings, used as a storage facility for cordite during World War II	
Lighthouse Keepers' Houses	24517	Cockburn Road	Henderson	32°07′53″S 115°46′06″E	1902		Part of Woodman Point Lighthouse Precinct (508); Federation-style Bungalow, domestic architecture built by the Public Works Department	
Naval Base Holiday Park	16994	Cockburn Road	Henderson	32°10′43″S 115°46′27″E	1933		Naval Base Shacks; Naval Base Caravan Park; Part of Peel Town Archaeological Sites Precinct (17868)	
Newmarket Hotel	504	1 Rockingham Road	Hamilton Hill	32°04′42″S 115°45′41″E	1912	7 September 2006	A two-storey Federation Filigree style building; Example of a substantial hotel built in a sparsely populated semi-rural area	
Peel Town Archaeological Sites	17868	Near Mount Brown, Beeliar Regional Park	Henderson	32°10′47″S 115°46′37″E	1829	8 December 2022	Clarence settlement	
Quarantine Station	499	O'Kane Court	Coogee	32°07′57″S 115°45′18″E	1886	31 March 2006	Also referred to as Woodman Point Recreation Camp; Victorian Regency style residence, one of two major quarantine stations in Western Australia	
Randwick Stables	9242	24 Rockingham Road	Hamilton Hill	32°04′48″S 115°45′56″E	1923	14 May 2002	A timber framed bungalow with a series of paddocks and stables	
Robb Jetty Chimney	3211	82 Bennett Avenue	North Coogee	32°05′19″S 115°45′35″E	1919	14 May 1996	Also referred to as Robb Jetty Abattoir; Industrial chimney stack, sole remaining structure of one of Western Australia's major abattoirs	
South Beach	16120	South Beach	North Coogee	32°05′22″S 115°45′19″E	1833	30 March 2003	Also referred to as South Beach Horse Exercise Area; Site of the first official horse race in Western Australia in October 1833	
South Fremantle Power Station	3381	Robb Street	North Coogee	32°05′39″S 115°45′33″E	1951	28 October 1997	One of several power stations built in the early 1950s around Australia and the only one of its kind in Western Australia	
Three Lime Kilns Group	10180	Lot 700 & Lot 48 Cockburn Road, Lot 2 Mayor Road	Coogee & Munster	32°06′55″S 115°45′58″E, 32°07′05″S 115°46′01″E, 32°07′40″S 115°46′56″E	1905	17 February 2006	Consisting of Coogee Lime Kilns, Tylee Lime Kiln and Munster Lime Kiln; The kilns are rare remaining examples of early twentieth-century single chamber rectangular lime kilns in the metropolitan area	
Woodman Point Lighthouse	508	Cockburn Road	Henderson	32°07′51″S 115°46′11″E	1902	13 August 2004	A representative example of an operational lighthouse, the only lighthouse in Australia that has the red and green sectors reversed	
Woodman Point Lighthouse	24424	Cockburn Road	Henderson	32°07′51″S 115°46′11″E			Part of Woodman Point Lighthouse Precinct (508)	
Wyola Wreck and Barge (Remains)	27013	Cockburn Road	North Coogee	32°05′19″S 115°45′18″E			Wyola Steam Tug; Part of South Beach Horse Exercise Area Precinct (16120)	
WRANS House, Wadjemup/ Rottnest Island^{[1]}	27033	Wadjemup Road	Rottnest Island	32°00′24″S 115°30′10″E	1937		Women's Royal Australian Naval Service (WRANS) House; Part of WWII Buildings, Oliver Hill Battery and Signal Ridge, Wadjemup/Rottnest Island Precinct (526)	

=== City of Cockburn heritage-listed places ===
The following places are heritage listed in the City of Cockburn but are not State registered:

Place name	Place #	Street number	Street name	Suburb or town	Notes & former names	Photo
Marchant Cottage	501		Hope Road	Bibra Lake		
Hamilton Hill Memorial Hall	503	435	Carrington Street	Hamilton Hill	Phoenix Theatre	
Hamilton Hill Primary School	505	110	Rockingham Road	Hamilton Hill	Calvary Christian School	
Jandakot School (former)	506	12	Poletti Road	Cockburn Central		
South Coogee Agricultural Hall	509	739	Rockingham Road	Munster		
Coogee Primary School (original bluilding)	510	22	Mayor Road	Coogee		
Uniting Church, Spearwood	513	330	Rockingham Road	Spearwood	Spearwood Methodist Church (former)	
St. Jerome's Church (former)	514	320	Rockingham Road	Spearwood	Cockburn Skillshare (former)	
South Coogee School (site)	771	183	Russell Road	Munster		
Residence	2414	22	Healy Road	Hamilton Hill		
Parish Hall, Spearwood	2718	15	Mell Road	Spearwood	Reformed Baptist Church, St Michael & All Angels Anglican Church	
Pensioner Guard Cottages	3391		Mayor & Cockburn Roads, Munster, Lake Coogee	Henderson	Lake Coogee Ruins	
Spearwood Alternative School	3456	370	Rockingham Road	Spearwood	Spearwood School, Old Spearwood School	
Wadjemup/ Rottnest Island	3650			Rottnest Island	Rottnest Island, Wadjemup	
House, Spearwood	4242	154	Mell Road	Spearwood		
Sawle's Old House (site)	4662		Rockingham Road	Henderson		
North Lake & Bibra Lake	5317	bounded by	Bibra Drive, Farrington Road & Progress Drive	North Lake & Bibra Lake	Beeliar Wetlands & Roe swamp, Lake Coolbellup & Lake Walliabup	
Hamilton Hill Senior High School	8829		Purvis Street	Hamilton Hill	Hamilton	
Coogee Primary School (original building)	8840	22	Mayor Road	Coogee		
Soccer & Recreation Ground	8842	Lot 14	Progress Drive	Bibra Lake		
Beeliar Regional Park & Adjacent Areas	9198			Melville, Kwinana & Hamilton Hill		
Banjup Memorial Park	10162		Armadale Road	Banjup		
Coogee Beach and Jetty	10164		Powell Road	Coogee		
Two Watsonia Cottages (site)	10165		Hamilton Road	Spearwood		
Dadley Home & Stone Shed (Site)	10166	707	Rockingham Road	Munster	Cotswold Poultry Farm, Kentia Gardens	
Denham Cottage	10167	20	Denham Street	Spearwood		
Dutch Windmill (Site)	10168	196	Semple Ct	Jandakot	The Dutch Windmill Garden Centre & Koffee Shoppe, The Dutch Windmill Garden & Gift Centre	
Greenslade's House	10169	75	Rockingham Road	Hamilton Hill		
Greenslade's Shop	10170	77	Rockingham Road	Hamilton Hill		
Hargreaves Park	10171		Counsel Road	Coolbellup		
Residence: Baker	10172	211	Clontarf Road	Hamilton Hill		
Residence: Meller	10173	7	Homestead Avenue	Bibra Lake		
Residence: Smith	10174	183	Clontarf Road	Hamilton Hill		
Sudell House	10175	355	Carrington Street	Hamilton Hill		
Naval Radio Station (site)	10176		Henderson Road	Munster	House: Henderson Road	
Jandakot Hall	10177	770	North Lake Road	South Lake	Anning Park Showground Agricultural Hall (site)	
Jandakot Wool Scours (site)	10178	19	Hammond Road	Jandakot		
Johnson's Stables	10179	19	Forrest Road	Hamilton Hill		
Magazine Jetty	10183		Cockburn Road	Munster	Woodman Point Jetty	
Manning Park	10184		Azelia Road	Hamilton Hill		
Mark's House	10185	1	Davilak Avenue	Hamilton Hill		
Moreton Bay Fig Trees	10186		Progress Drive	Bibra Lake		
Naprednik Club & Citaonica (former)	10187	340	Rockingham Road	Spearwood	Spearwood Progress Club	
Nick Marich House	10188	23	Phoenix Road	Spearwood		
Norfolk Island Pine Tree	10189	9	Kent Street	Spearwood		
Anderson Homestead (site)	10190	797	Rockingham Road	Henderson		
Council Buildings (former)	10191	1	Forrest Road	Hamilton Hill	Fremantle District Roads Board (former), Spearwood Estate Agency, Cockburn Council Chambers (former)	
Jandakot Hotel (former)	10192	34	Prout Way	Bibra Lake		
Residence, Goldsmith Road	10193	35	Goldsmith Road	Spearwood	Santillo House, Zuevla House	
Paulik's House	10194	56	Phoenix Road	Hamilton Hill		
Separovich House	10195	33	Lintott Way	Spearwood		
Straughair's House	10196	13	Rigby Avenue	Spearwood		
Spearwood Presbytery (former)	10197	10	Edeline Street	Spearwood	Sumich House	
Thorsager House (site)	10198	425	Rockingham Road	Spearwood		
Stand of Tuarts	10199		Rockingham Road	Henderson		
Tuart Trees, Lake Coogee	10200		Fawcett Road	Munster		
Woody Pears (Xylem occidentale)	10201	Lot 90	Forrest Road	Bibra Lake		
St James' Church	11622	Corner	Elderberry Drive/Hackettiana Avenue	South Lake		
Rectory	11624	14	Fallow Crescent	Spearwood		
Palms and Norfolk Island Pine Trees	12989	24	Rockingham Road	Hamilton Hill		
Our Lady of Mount Carmel Priory & Hall	13154	82	Collick Street	Hilton		
St Teresa Hall	13155	17	Friar John Way	Coolbellup		
Woodman Point Natural Area	14368			Munster		
Spearwood Fire Station	14645	246	Spearwood Avenue	Spearwood		
Manse	15040	33	Davilak Avenue	Hamilton Hill		
Manse	15041	5	Brandwood Gdns	Leeming		
Uniting Church, Coolbellup	15042	9-11	Mamillius Street	Coolbellup		
Manse	15043	30	Goongarrie Drive	Cooloongup		
Church	15044		Erindoon Way	Cooloongup		
Cockburn War Memorial	15692	Corner	Rockingham Road & Carrington Street	Hamilton Hill		
RSL War Memorial	15693		Spearwood Avenue Beale Park	Spearwood		
Peace Park	15694		Spearwood Avenue	Spearwood		
Carnac Island	16783			Carnac Island		
Bibra Lake Speedway	16823		Hope Road	Jandakot		
Residence, 100 Clontarf Road	16991	100	Clontarf Road	Hamilton Hill		
Chamberlain House	16992	108	Clontarf Road	Hamilton Hill		
Residence, 110 Clontarf Road	16993	110	Clontarf Road	Hamilton Hill		
Residence - 361 Cockburn Road	16995	361	Cockburn Road	Coogee	Explosive Magazine Watchman's Residence	
Residence - 377 Cockburn Road	16996	377	Cockburn Road	Coogee	Explosive Magazine Watchman's Residence	
Giuffre Residence (site)	16997	8	Fawcett Road	Munster		
Residence - 108 Forrest Road	16998	108	Forrest Road	Hamilton Hill		
Dragojevich Residence (former)	16999	253	Hamilton Road	Coogee		
Watsonia Factory (site)	17000	174	Hamilton Road	Spearwood	Watson's Food	
Limestone Office on Bradken (site)	17001		Island Street	South Fremantle	South Fremantle Foundry, Bradford-Kendall Foundry	
Residence, Ivicevitch/Miyat	17003	462	Rockingham Road	Munster		
Residence, Novak/Separovich (site)	17004	4	Newton Street	Spearwood		
Lanza's Old Place	17005	511	Rockingham Road	Munster		
Tuart Tree, Henderson (site)	17007	39	Success Way	Henderson		
Paperbark Trees, Beenyup Road	17008		Beenyup Road Reserve	Atwell		
Tuart Trees, Woodman Point	17009		Cockburn Road	Munster		
Moreton Bay Fig Trees	17010		Cockburn Road	North Coogee		
Four Norfolk Pine Trees	17011	104	Forrest Road	Hamilton Hill		
Norfolk Island Pine Trees	17012		Goldsmith Road	Spearwood		
Wetlands	17013		Hamilton Road	Spearwood		
Norfolk Pine Tree, Hamilton Road	17014	300	Hamilton Road	Spearwood		
Norfolk Island Pine Trees	17015	Corner	Hope Road North Lake Road	Bibra Lake		
Moreton Bay Fig Tree	17016	110	Rockingham Road	Hamilton Hill		
30 Tuart Trees	17017		Rockingham Road Reserve	Henderson		
Tuart Tree, Roe Highway Reserve	17018		Roe Highway Reserve	Hamilton Hill		
Paperbark Tree, Tapper Road	17019		Tapper Road	Atwell		
Cockburn Police Station & Quarters	17450	392	Rockingham Road	Cockburn		
Cockburn Sound Anti-Submarine Boom	17789		in the Indian Ocean on the land side of Garden Island	Cockburn		
Hamilton Hill Hostel	18584	20	Frederick Street	Hamilton Hill		
Diana Shipwreck	18625			Spearwood		
James Matthews Shipwreck	18657			Woodman Point via Munster		
James Shipwreck	18658			Spearwood		
Jandakot Airport Area	18659		Hope Road	Jandakot		
Baldivis Tramway Reserve	24422		Branch Circuit	Jandakot		
South Beach Battery (remains)	24456		Emplacement Crescent	Hamilton Hill		
Two Soccer Clubs	24508		Hamilton Road	Spearwood	Beale Park, Dalmatinac Park, Spearwood Dalmatinac, Cockburn City Soccer Club	
Woodlands (site)	24512	174	Hamilton Road	Spearwood		
Armadale/Fremantle Rail Armadale Road to Cockburn	24582		Armadale Road	Forrestdale		
Hamilton Hill Swamp Precinct	24707	18-70	Rockingham Road	Hamilton Hill		
Tannery and Fellworks (former), Cockburn	25873	17	Cockburn Road	North Coogee		
Residence, 94 Rockingham Road, Hamilton Hill	26302	94	Rockingham Road	Hamilton Hill		
Robb Jetty (remains)	26411		Bennett Avenue	North Coogee	Robb's Jetty	
Mr Crossman's House Ruins	27014	837	Cockburn Road	Henderson		
Limestone Wall and Ruins, Munster	27017	Lot 103	West Churchill Avenue	Munster		
Infantry Battalion Barracks Site, Wadjemup/ Rottnest Island	27555			Rottnest Island	Airfield Camp, Salt Lake City	

== Notes ==
- ^[1] Listed under both Rottnest Island and the City of Cockburn
