= Beeliar Drive =

Road in Perth, Western Australia

Beeliar Drive Western Australia
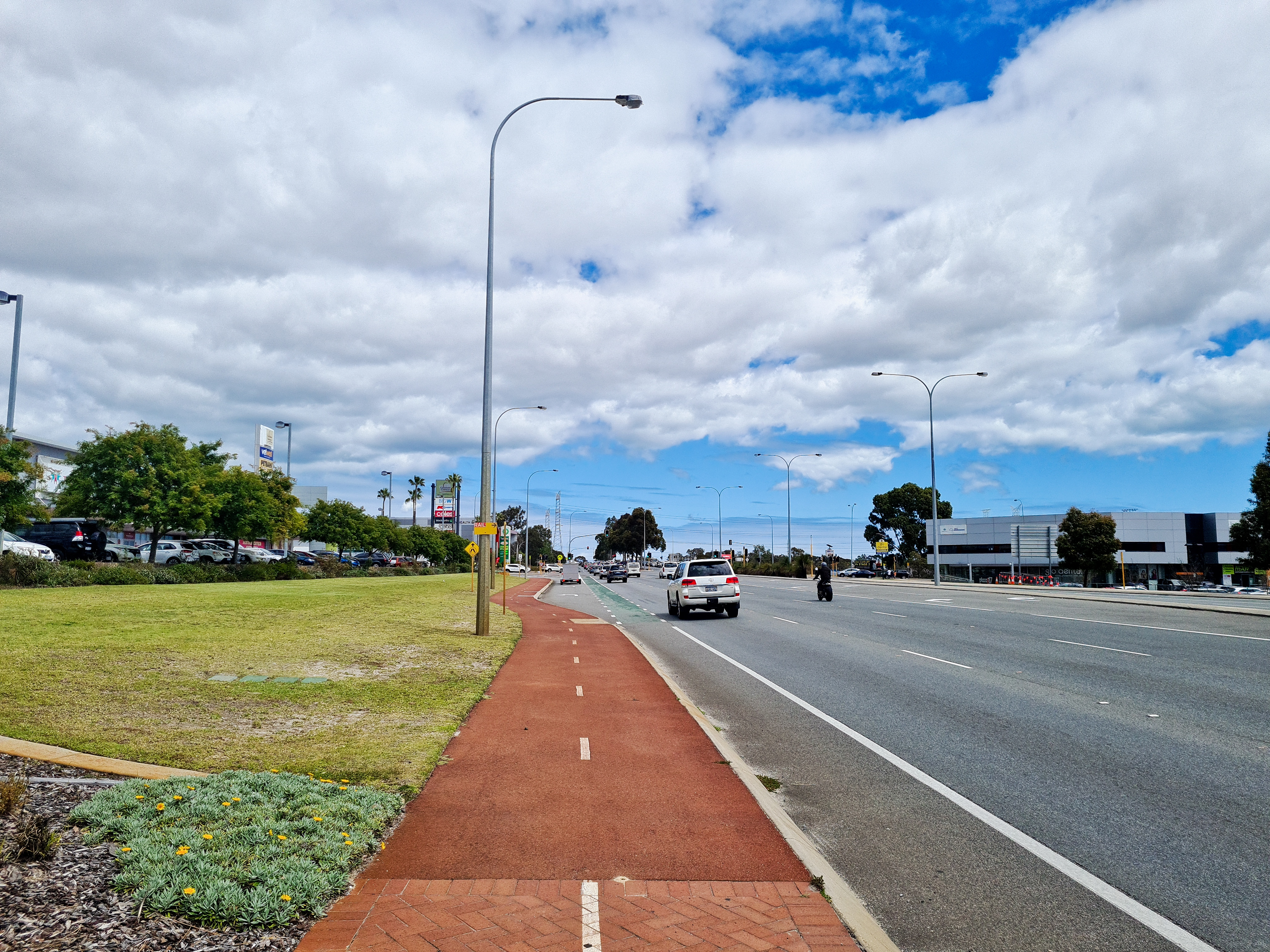
- Beeliar Drive looking west towards the intersection with Midgegoroo Avenue in Success

General information
- Type: Road
- Length: 7.7 km (4.8 mi)
- Opened: 1991
- Route number(s): State Route 14 (Spearwood Avenue to Armadale Road)

Major junctions
- East end: Solomon Road Jandakot
- Armadale Road (State Route 14); Kwinana Freeway (State Route 2); Midgegoroo Avenure; Spearwood Avenue (State Route 14); Stock Road (National Route 1); Rockingham Road
- West end: Mayor Road Lake Coogee

Location(s)
- Major suburbs: Cockburn Central, Success, Yangebup, Beeliar

Beeliar Drive is a major arterial road in the southwestern part of the Perth Metropolitan Area. It provides an important and unbroken east-west link between Kwinana Freeway and Stock Road providing access to residential developments in Beeliar, Yangebup and Lake Coogee in the west to commercial and industrial development in Cockburn Central, Jandakot and Success in the east. It is one of Perth's more recent arterial road constructions with development of the road occurring between the early 1990s and early 2020s.

It commences at a roundabout with Rockingham Road in Lake Coogee as a continuation of Mayor Road and follows a gently curving pattern reflecting its original Noongar name in a due easterly direction 7.7 kilometres (4.8 mi) to terminate at a roundabout interchange with Armadale Road/Solomon Road in Jandakot. The road is signed as State Route 14 east of the Spearwood Avenue roundabout. As of 2021, Beeliar Drive is a four-lane dual carriageway for the vast majority of its length; the section west of Stock Road is two lanes while the section between Kwinana Freeway and Wentworth Parade is six lanes.

== History ==
"Beeliar" is a Noongar word that translates to "river" or "water running through". with the word lending its name to a number of features in southwestern Perth.

Prior to the 1990s the main east-west road connection in the area was Yangebup Road. Due to ongoing development in south-western Perth which the planned Kwinana Freeway extension was expected to exacerbate in conjunction with concerns the development would have on the ecologically sensitive Beeliar Wetlands the decision was made to realign the existing Yangebup Road corridor away from its existing location on the southern bank of Yangebup Lake to the south along the lake's watershed with neighbouring Kogolup Lake. Construction of the new two-lane alignment occurred in 1991 and was timed to finish in line with the freeway extension, upon which it was renamed Beeliar Drive. Originally running from the freeway as far as Lorimer Road (now Spearwood Avenue), both the Kwinana Freeway and Beeliar Drive projects meant the original main road between Fremantle and Armadale, Forrest Road, was severed. The section west of the freeway was renamed North Lake Road and realigned to terminate at Beeliar Drive. The section east of the freeway, now renamed Armadale Road, was realigned to be an eastern continuation of Beeliar Drive, initially as an at-grade intersection with the Kwinana Freeway before being converted to a diamond interchange around the turn of the millennium.

A two-lane extension from Spearwood Avenue to Watson Road (in the vicinity of the existing Yangebup Road corridor) commenced in 2001 and included a grade-separated railway underpass to replace two separate at-level crossings on Yangebup Road. In 2009, Beeliar Drive was extended to Stock Road, severing Yangebup Road's connection to the highway. Yangebup Road is now a series of local streets, with the section immediately south of the lake now a pathway.

Staged duplication of Beeliar Drive commenced in the early 2000s, with the section from Kwinana Freeway to Spearwood Avenue completed by 2006. Prior to the early 2010s, Beeliar Drive was a single carriageway from Hammond Road to Dunraven Drive, near Spearwood Avenue. When Spearwood Avenue was fully extended and completed, Beeliar Drive too was upgraded to a dual carriageway. Beeliar Drive was also a single carriageway from Spearwood Avenue to Stock Road prior to 2016. Four-laning was extended to just east of the Stock Road intersection in 2016-17 with the intersection itself upgraded in 2021. Due to ongoing development of Cockburn Central and Success the section of Beeliar Drive between Kwinana Freeway and Wentworth Parade was upgraded to six lanes in 2014 with significant changes made to the old North Lake Road intersection, now renamed Midgegooroo Avenue.

== Current upgrades ==
=== Armadale Road to North Lake Road Bridge ===
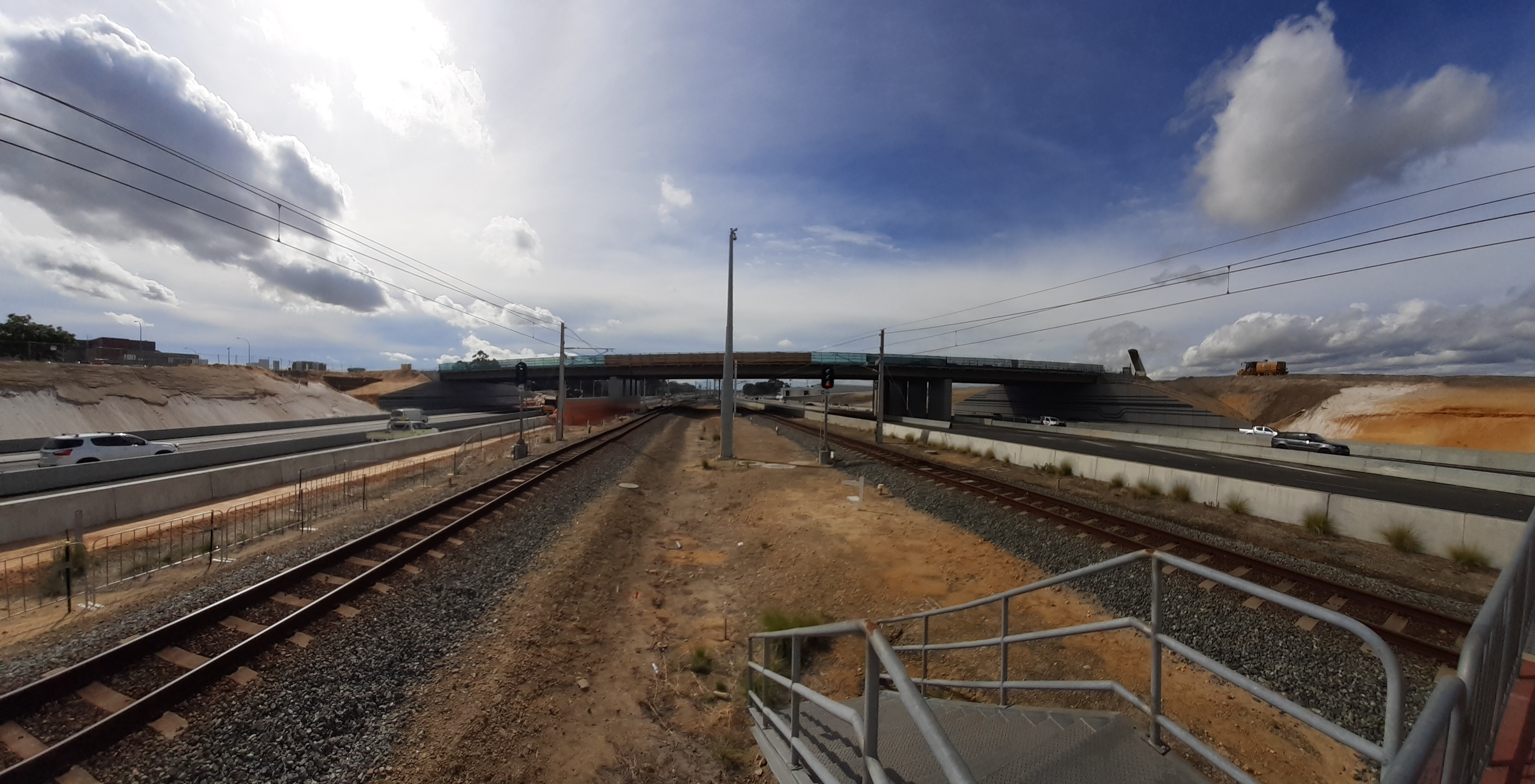
The bridge under construction in March 2021

This project involves the construction of a bridge over Kwinana Freeway with north-facing on and off ramps and have Armadale Road redirect to connect with North Lake Road instead of Beeliar Drive. This will remove another one of the state's black spots, the Beeliar Drive / Midgegooroo Avenue intersection, reduce congestion on the Kwinana Freeway interchange, and improve access to Cockburn Central railway station. As a result of the upgrade the old section of Armadale Road was renamed Beeliar Drive which now extends into the Jandakot industrial area, terminating at a roundabout interchange with Armadale Road. Beeliar Drive continues as Solomon Road east of the interchange.

This project will link with the Kwinana Freeway northbound widening from Russell Road to Roe Highway, as well as the Armadale Road widening. Construction began in late 2018 / early 2019, with completion occurring in December 2021.

== Major intersections ==
LGA	Location	km	mi	Destinations	Notes
Cockburn	Lake Coogee	0	0.0	Rockingham Road north, south / Mayor Road west – Spearwood, Fremantle, Henderson	Roundabout; Beeliar Drive continues as Mayor Road west of this point
Cockburn	Lake Coogee–Yangebup–Beeliar tripoint	0.3	0.19	Stock Road (National Route 1) – O'Connor, Fremantle, Rockingham	Traffic light intersection
Cockburn	Yangebup–Beeliar boundary	1.0	0.62	Durnin Avenue	Roundabout
Cockburn	Yangebup–Beeliar boundary	2.5	1.6	Spearwood Avenue (State Route 14) – Spearwood, Coogee, Munster	Roundabout, State Route 14 western concurrency terminus
Cockburn	Cockburn Central–Success boundary	5.2	3.2	Kemp Road	Roundabout
Cockburn	Cockburn Central–Success boundary	5.5	3.4	Hammond Road – South Lake, Hammond Park	Traffic light intersection
Cockburn	Cockburn Central–Success boundary	6.5	4.0	Wentworth Parade	Traffic light intersection
Cockburn	Cockburn Central–Success boundary	6.7	4.2	Midgegoroo Avenue north / Cockburn Gateway Shopping City access south – North Lake, Kardinya, Fremantle	Traffic light intersection, Midgegoroo Avenue connects North Lake Road to Beeliar Drive. Provides access to Cockburn Central railway station
Cockburn	Cockburn Central–Jandakot–Atwell–Success quadripoint	7.2	4.5	Kwinana Freeway (State Route 2) – Joondalup, Perth, Mandurah	Diamond interchange
Cockburn	Atwell–Jandakot boundary	7.7	4.8	Armadale Road (State Route 14) west, east / Solomon Road north – North Lake, Fremantle, Forrestdale, Armadale	Roundabout interchange favouring Armadale Road. Continues as Solomon Road north. Provides access to Cockburn Central railway station
Cockburn	1.000 mi = 1.609 km; 1.000 km = 0.621 mi: Concurrency terminus				
