= Stock Road =

Road in Perth, Western Australia

Stock Road Western Australia
- Coordinates: 32°1′2.6″S 115°47′31″E (North end); 32°8′13.7″S 115°47′22.4″E (South end)

General information
- Type: Road
- Length: 13.9 km (8.6 mi)
- Route number(s): National Route 1 (Leach Highway – Rockingham Road)

Major junctions
- North end: Page Street, Attadale
- Canning Highway (State Route 6); Leach Highway (National Route 1 / State Route 7); Spearwood Avenue (State Route 14); Beeliar Drive
- South end: Rockingham Road (National Route 1), Munster

Location(s)
- Major suburbs: Palmyra, O'Connor, Hamilton Hill, Bibra Lake, Spearwood

Stock Road is an arterial road in the southern suburbs of Perth, Western Australia. The northern terminus is at Page Street in Attadale, near Point Walter on the Swan River. It runs southwards to Canning Highway and then Leach Highway as a residential road. Beyond Leach Highway, it is part of National Route 1, and continues south as a dual carriageway. It ends at Rockingham Road, which runs south as National Route 1 towards Rockingham, and north-west towards Fremantle.

== Major intersections ==
All intersections below are controlled by traffic signals unless otherwise indicated.

| LGA | Location | km | mi | Destinations | Notes |
|---|---|---|---|---|---|
| Melville | Attadale–Bicton boundary | 0 | 0.0 | Page Street | Road terminates and sharply curves east to continue as Page Street to finish at Burke Drive on the southern shore of the Swan River. |
| Melville | Attadale–Bicton boundary | 1.2 | 0.75 | Lutey Road | Roundabout |
| Melville | Attadale–Bicton boundary | 1.5 | 0.93 | Preston Point Road – East Fremantle | Roundabout |
| Melville | Attadale–Bicton–Melville–Palmyra quadripoint | 3.4 | 2.1 | Canning Highway (State Route 6) – Fremantle, Como, Perth Airport, Midland | |
| Melville | Melville–Palmyra boundary | 3.4 | 2.1 | Marmion Street – Booragoon | |
| Melville | Melville–Palmyra–Willagee boundary | 3.7 | 2.3 | Leach Highway (National Route 1) – Fremantle, Bull Creek, Welshpool, Perth Airport | National Route 1 northern concurrency terminus |
| Melville–Fremantle boundary | Willagee–O'Connor boundary | 4.5 | 2.8 | Garling Street east / Stockdale Road west | |
| Fremantle | O'Connor–Samson–Hilton tripoint | 5.3 | 3.3 | South Street (State Route 13) – South Fremantle, White Gum Valley, Murdoch, Canning Vale | |
| Fremantle–Cockburn boundary | Samson–Coolbellup–Hamilton Hill–Hilton quadripoint | 6.6 | 4.1 | Winterfold Road | Split intersection |
| Cockburn | Coolbellup–Bibra Lake–Hamilton Hill tripoint | 8.2 | 5.1 | Forrest Road | |
| Cockburn | Bibra Lake–Spearwood–Hamilton Hill tripoint | 8.8 | 5.5 | Phoenix Road | |
| Cockburn | Bibra Lake–Spearwood boundary | 9.6 | 6.0 | Spearwood Avenue (State Route 14) – North Coogee, Bibra Lake, Yangebup | |
| Cockburn | Bibra Lake–Yangebup–Lake Coogee–Spearwood quadripoint | 11.5 | 7.1 | Barrington Street | |
| Cockburn | Yangebup–Beeliar–Lake Coogee tripoint | 12.9 | 8.0 | Beeliar Drive – Success, Cockburn Central, Jandakot, Armadale | Replaced a connection to Yangebup Road in 2009 |
| Cockburn | Beeliar–Lake Coogee boundary | 13.9 | 8.6 | Rockingham Road – Fremantle | Road terminus: continues south as Rockingham Road (National Route 1) to Rockingham and Mandurah |
1.000 mi = 1.609 km; 1.000 km = 0.621 mi: Concurrency terminus
