= WA Wildlife =

Wildlife rescue organization in Western Australia

WA Wildlife, operated by Native ARC Inc, is a wildlife rescue, treatment and rehabilitation facility in the Beeliar Wetlands near Bibra Lake, Western Australia; it was the first wildlife rehabilitation facility to be licensed as a veterinary hospital by the Veterinary Practice Board of Western Australia in 2018. It has a purpose built hospital (known as the WA Wildlife Hospital) to care for the animals, with intensive care unit facilities to care for animals that would have previously been euthanised. The hospital provides treatment to more than 6500 sick and injured native animals each year. Facilities include a triage room, treatment room, consultation room, laboratory, surgery, radiology, ICU, seabird, mammal and reptile wards, isolation ward with decontamination chamber and a stand-alone necropsy suite. WA Wildlife is part of group of organisations helping to protect the nests of the snake-necked turtles that breed around Bibra Lake. In 2020 it was estimated that 25 of the hatchlings were able to make it to the safety of the lake. Native Arc Inc is a registered charity, number 21503, licensed under the Charitable Collections Act 1946.

The official launch of the new WA Wildlife site and facilities (after transitioning from Native ARC and undergoing a multi-million dollar redevelopment) was on 2 May 2023.

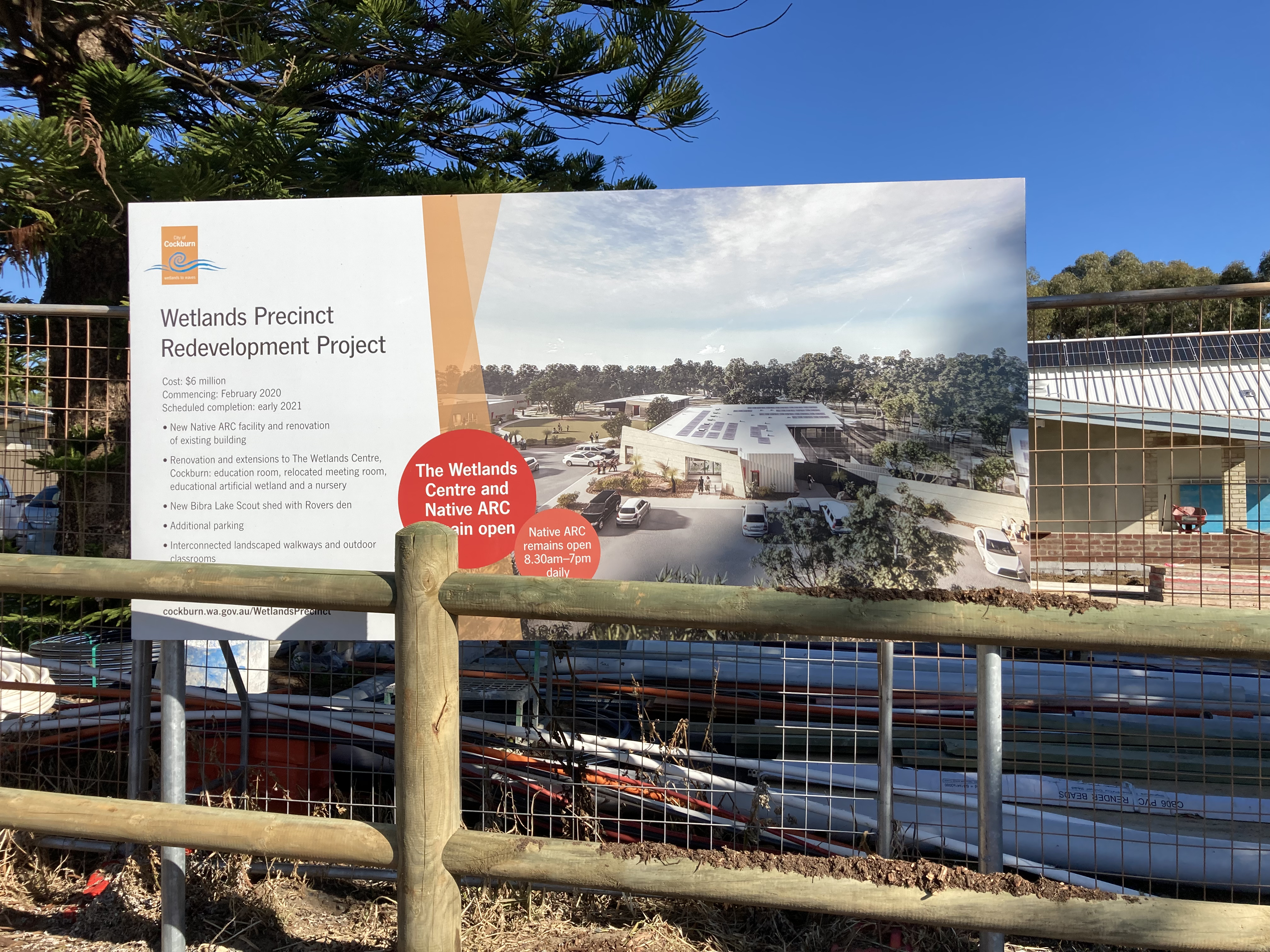
Construction sign of the WA Wildlife complex, August 2021

== History ==
WA Wildlife was originally formed as Native ARC (referring to the Native Animal Rehabilitation Centre); it was established in 1998 to care for, rehabilitate, and ultimately return injured wildlife to where they were found. In April 2021, WA Wildlife commenced operating the WA Wildlife Hospital, which was funded by a A$6 million grant from the City of Cockburn, as part of the upgrade of the Hope Road precinct, which includes The Wetlands Centre and the Bibra Lake Scout Group facilities.

== WA Wildlife Hospital ==
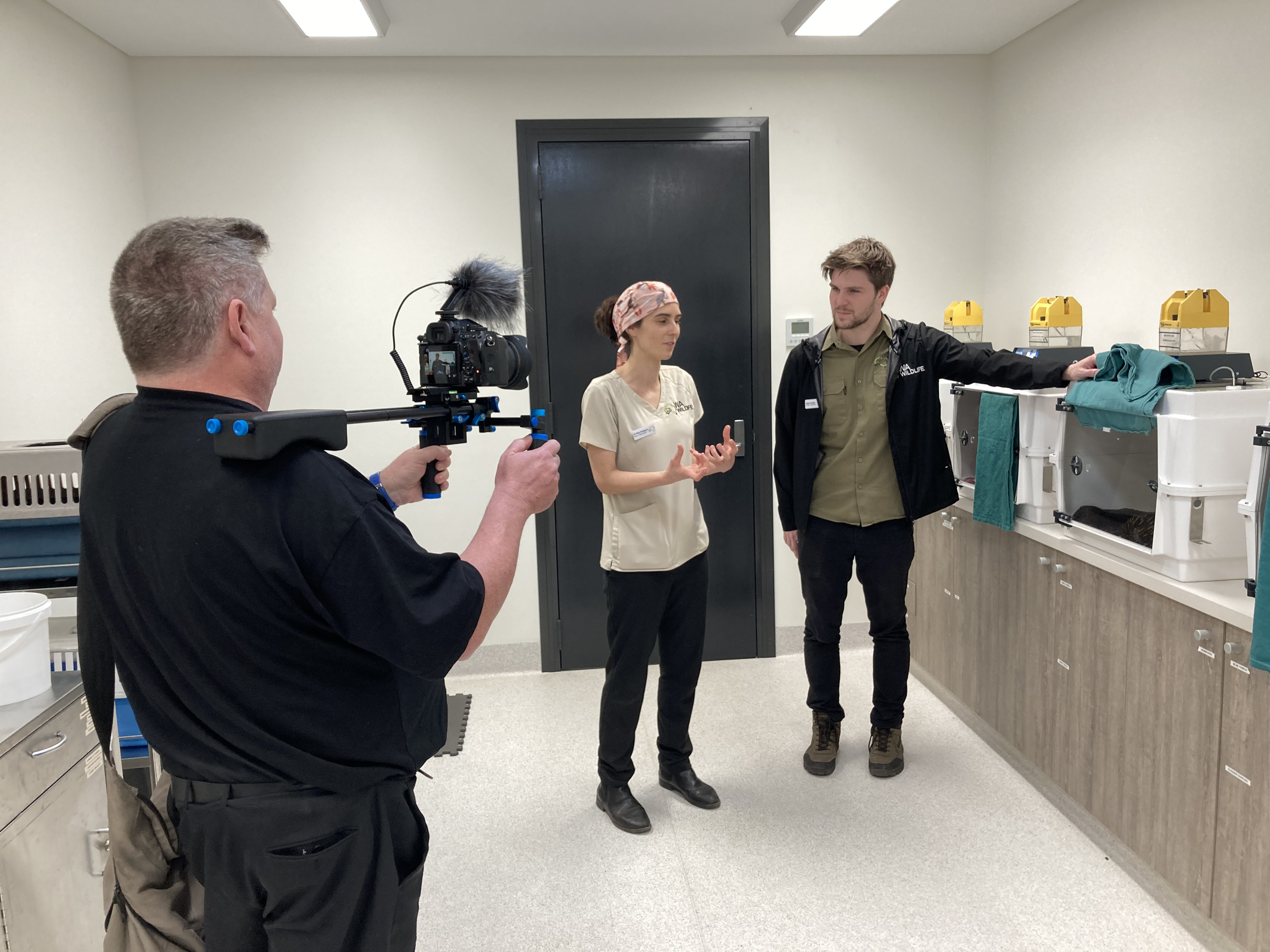
Filming inside the veterinary area for Wikimania 2021

The WA Wildlife Hospital, in Perth's southern suburbs, is Australia's first holistic trauma hospital for native wildlife, admitting up to 50 animals a day. It provides specialist emergency procedures for injured animals and rehabilitates them for release. In 2021, the Hospital admitted more than 5,500 sick and injured animals with 40 per cent of patients released back into the wild. For more than two decades, WA Wildlife worked out of a tiny old cottage on site, previously trading as Native ARC from 1998 until 2021. The current Bibra Lake Hospital was funded by the City of Cockburn and Lotterywest, and at almost 700 square metres, it is one of the largest wildlife hospitals in Australia. The hospital is a purpose-built facility with a specially designed surgery, radiology, treatment room, laboratory, isolation ward, species specific recovery wards and on-site rehabilitation facilities including a large kitchen, laundry and pre-release flight/exercise enclosures. The hospital receives no government funding and relies on donations from the public to support operating costs.

The Hospital saw its busiest year on record in 2022 with over 6500 sick and injured animals admitted that year.

In May 2023, the WA Wildlife Hospital coordinated a small oil spill incident. 53 Australian pelicans were admitted to the hospital covered in an unknown, heavy oil contaminant from an unknown location. All birds required daily washes and housing for up to six weeks in purpose-built pre-release enclosures. The incident was the largest land-based oil spill seen in Western Australia and the largest oil spill coordinated by any wildlife rehabilitation facility in the state's history. 78% of Pelicans were successfully washed and rehabilitated, with the incident costing WA Wildlife tens of thousands of dollars in both direct and indirect costs (i.e. volunteer time).

== WA Wildlife Ambulance mobile rescue service ==
In February 2021 WA Wildlife established the WA Wildlife Ambulance, which was the first full time wildlife rescue service in Western Australia. It operates every day of the year and will rescue any injured wildlife native to Western Australia. The WA Wildlife ambulance is the only rescue service in Western Australia that has paid wildlife rescuers (funded by the Society for the Prevention of Cruelty to Animals International), specifically trained to deal with a range of wildlife species. The Ambulance routinely rescues sick and injured adult kangaroos using both trained wildlife rescuers and veterinary staff.

== Margaret River Wildlife Hospital ==
On 23 October 2026, WA Wildlife, in partnership with Wildlife Recovery Australia, officially opened the Margaret River Wildlife Hospital. The Hospital is the first dedicated wildlife hospital in the south west of Western Australia.

== Research ==
WA Wildlife participates in research with other organisations, including:

- the Sentinel Clinic Disease Surveillance program run by Wildlife Health Australia
- the Department of Primary Industries and Regional Development
- the Department of Biodiversity, Conservation and Attractions

It also collects data and samples for a variety of local research projects, including those related to animal diseases and tracking.

== Educational programs ==
WA Wildlife has several animals who, due to their injuries, are unable to be returned to the wild. They remain in residence at WA Wildlife, and some of them are used as part of the education programs that focus on supporting, protecting and conserving wildlife and their habitats.

On 25 October 2023, WA Wildlife launched educational tours for the public, offering the public an insight into a working wildlife veterinary hospital and rehabilitation facility. Visitors do not interact directly with the animals, but are able to observe treatment through viewing windows. The tour also includes a native fauna display, with dingoes, a wombat, reptiles, possums, emus, and a variety of other birds.

== Wildcare Helpline ==
The Wildcare Helpline is a service providing information to the public on what to do if they find sick or injured native wildlife. It is owned by the Department of Biodiversity, Conservation and Attractions, and run by WA Wildlife volunteers.

== WA Wildlife Op Shops ==
WA Wildlife operates two op shops, in Hilton and Yangebup, selling a range of second hand goods. Proceeds from both stores support running costs of the WA Wildlife Hospital.

== See also ==
Kanyana Wildlife Rehabilitation Centre

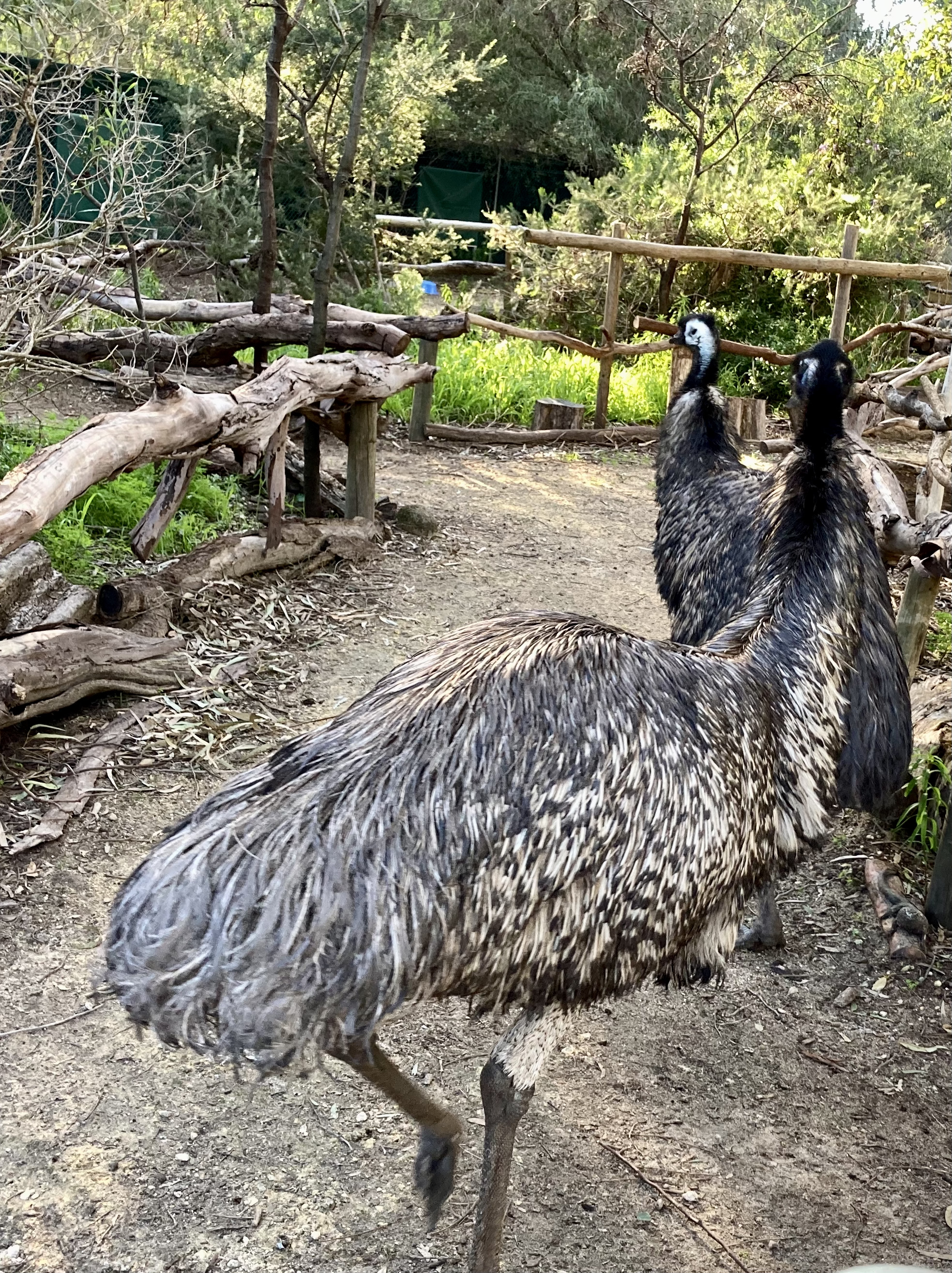
Resident emus
