= Lake Coogee, Western Australia =

Lake Coogee
- Suburb
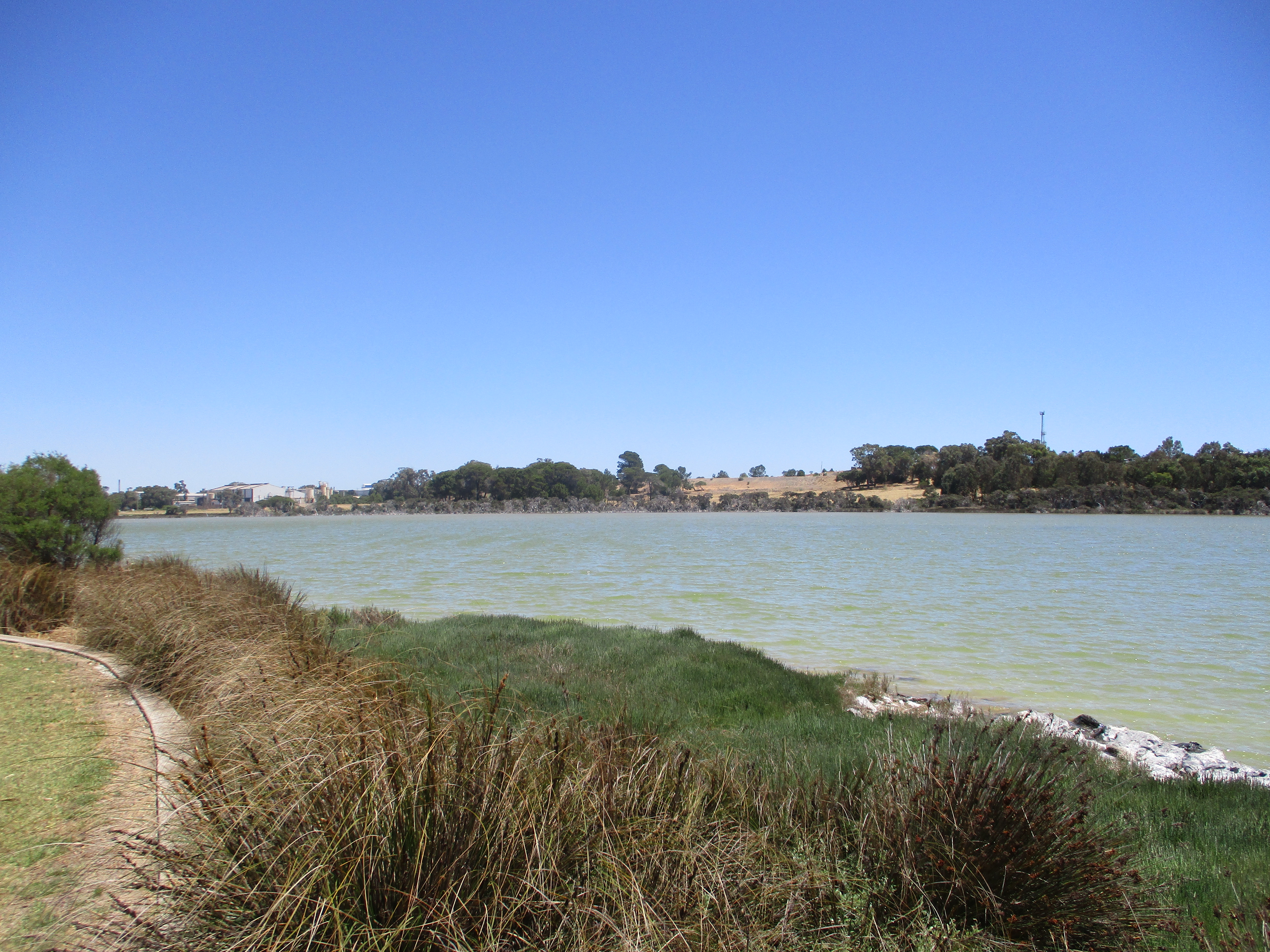
- Lake Coogee, after which the suburb is named
- Interactive map of Lake Coogee
- Coordinates: 32.128°S 115.779°E
- Country: Australia
- State: Western Australia
- City: Perth
- LGA: City of Cockburn
- Established: 30 March 2020

Government
  - State electorates: Cockburn; Willagee
  - Federal division: Fremantle

Area
  - Total: 3.4 km^{2} (1.3 sq mi)

Population
  - Total: 4,768 (SAL 2021)
- Postcode: 6166
Suburbs around Lake Coogee
Coogee	Spearwood	Bibra Lake
Henderson	Lake Coogee	Yangebup Beeliar
Henderson	Henderson	Munster

Lake Coogee is a suburb of Perth, Western Australia, located within the City of Cockburn, and named after Lake Coogee, located within the suburb.

== History ==
In 2019, the City of Cockburn approved a split of the suburb of Munster, whereby the north-western part of the suburb became the new suburb of Lake Coogee, while another part, in the south-west, was added to the suburb of Henderson. Only the eastern part of Munster remained part of the existing suburb. The changes came into effect on 30 March 2020.

Prior to being part of the suburb of Munster from 1954, the district had been known as South Coogee since the 1870s and this earlier name remains in use by older settlers of the area. The district is one of the earliest parts of Western Australia to be settled by Europeans and the remains of the cottages built by the Pensioner Guards in the 1880s can still be seen around the Lake Coogee reserve.

== Geography ==
The suburb is bounded by Troode and Barrington Streets to the north, Stock Road and Rockingham Road to the east, Frobisher Avenue to the south and the Beeliar Regional Park Lake Coogee reserve to the west. after which the suburb takes its name.

== Facilities ==
There is one school in the area, Saint Jerome's School, a Catholic primary school.

The main recreational area in the suburb is Santich Park, which was named after Arthur Santich for his volunteer work within the Council (whose descendants still live in the area), is the home of the Yangebup Little Athletics Club and the South Coogee Junior Football Club.

== Transport ==
=== Bus ===
- 114 Lake Coogee to Elizabeth Quay Bus Station – serves Asquith Street, Marvell Avenue and Shelley Way
- 530 Fremantle Station to Cockburn Central Station – serves Rockingham Road and Beeliar Drive
- 531 Fremantle Station to Cockburn Central Station – serves Marvell Avenue, Rockingham Road and Beeliar Drive
- 532 Fremantle Station to Cockburn Central Station – serves Hamilton Road, Mayor Road and Beeliar Drive
- 549 Fremantle Station to Rockingham Station – serves Rockingham Road, Beeliar Drive and Stock Road
