= Coogee, Western Australia =

Coogee
- Suburb
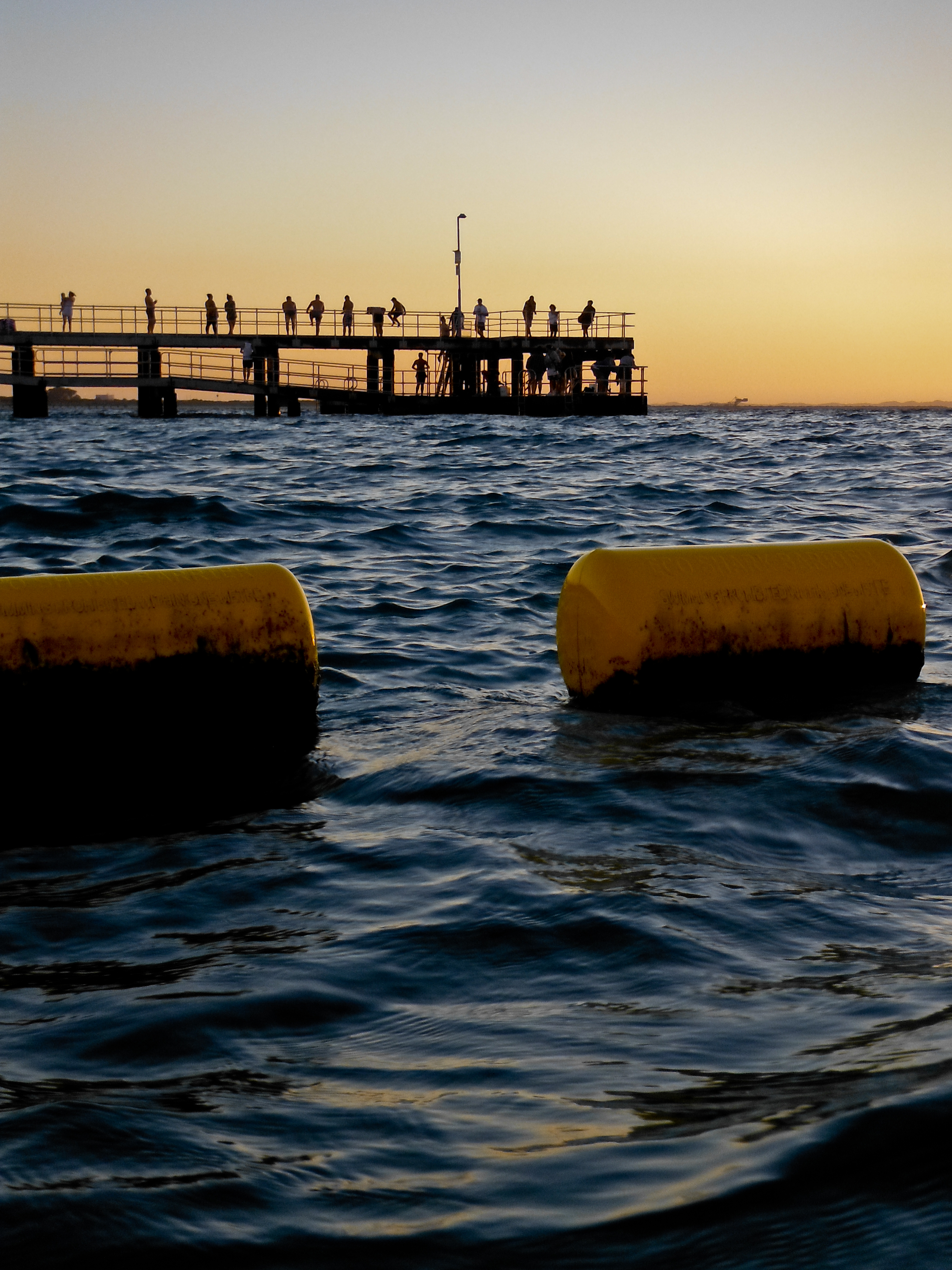
- Jetty and shark net at Coogee Beach
- Interactive map of Coogee
- Coordinates: 32°07′20″S 115°45′55″E
- Country: Australia
- State: Western Australia
- City: Perth
- LGA: City of Cockburn
- Location: 23 km (14 mi) from Perth
- Established: 1980s

Government
  - State electorate: Cockburn
  - Federal division: Fremantle

Area
  - Total: 5.3 km^{2} (2.0 sq mi)

Population
  - Total: 5,345 (SAL 2021)
- Postcode: 6166
Suburbs around Coogee
North Coogee	Spearwood	Spearwood
Cockburn Sound	Coogee	Spearwood
	Henderson	Lake Coogee

Coogee (/ˈkuːdʒi/) is a southern coastal suburb of Perth, Western Australia, located within the City of Cockburn.

== History ==
The suburb takes its name from the lake, Lake Coogee, in the area, which translates to "Body of water" in the native Aboriginal Nyoongar language. Originally this lake was named Lake Munster after Prince William, the Earl of Munster, and later King William IV. The Aboriginal name Kou-gee was recorded in 1841 by Thomas Watson and has been variously spelt Koojee, Coojee and Coogee.

The first European settlement in the region occurred with the ill-fated settlement by Thomas Peel at the Clarence townsite behind Woodman Point in 1829, the townsite being abandoned in 1831. Settlement of the area commenced in the 1870s around Lake Coogee on Rockingham Road (the first road between Fremantle and Rockingham).

The current residential area of Coogee commenced development in the 1980s. Previously it was an area of limestone ridge, small rural lots and market gardens in the west and south portions of the current suburb. Denser residential development was limited to a small area in the northwest of the current suburb about Beach Road and King Street. That area was better known as the locality of Coogee Beach. Some buildings still standing in that area date back to the nineteenth century.

== Coogee Hotel ==
In 1898, Walter Powell applied for a publican's licence in Four-mile Well, Coogee. He extended and renovated the existing building, turning it into the Coogee Hotel. He traded for twenty years, until his death in 1923, fostering local sports, particularly horse racing, and giving the local community of meat workers and market gardeners a place to socialise and relax. The hotel was de-licensed in 1927, and became a holiday home for orphans under the Swan Anglican Children's Homes in 1930. In 1946 the orphans were housed there full-time. In 1968, threatened with demolition by Main Roads to build a high-capacity road through the area, the orphanage sold the hotel and moved out. It was not demolished, and was used intermittently as private offices. An extension was added in the early 1990s, and the building was heritage listed in 2001.

Restaurateur Nic Trimboli and property developer Adrian Fini bought the building from Main Roads in 2017 with the intention of opening the building as a restaurant. The restaurant refurbishment was underway in December 2019, and reopened as Coogee Commons on 5 March 2022.

== Geography ==
Coogee is located 7 kilometres (4.3 mi) south of Fremantle and overlooks Cockburn Sound with views of Garden Island, Carnac Island and Rottnest Island. The suburb is bounded by Ocean Road to the north, Hamilton Road to the east, the Beeliar Drive (road extension) to the south and Cockburn Road/Indian Ocean to the west.

To the southwest of the suburb lies Woodman Point, an "A" Grade reserve with several kilometres of beach frontage onto Cockburn Sound. Features of Woodman Point include a large jetty used during World War II for the transport of munitions. There are also a large number of disused but preserved munitions stores in the reserves. The Reserve also features large picnic areas and is a popular fishing locality.

A project known as Port Coogee is under construction to the North-West of Coogee in the suburb now known as North Coogee. It includes a new marina and a housing estate to complement the existing suburb of Coogee.

While geographically the suburb of Coogee is a relatively small and defined residential area, the name Coogee has been used extensively as a regional name and reference point. The Southern part of the neighbouring suburb of Munster was previously known as the two localities of South Coogee (or Coogee South) and Woodman Point. Lake Coogee is now within that portion of Munster. In December 2005 a portion of Coogee was incorporated into the new suburb of North Coogee.

== Facilities ==
There is a single government primary school, Coogee Primary School, located in the southern portion of the suburb.

The main recreation reserves are Poole Reserve on Hamilton Road and Coogee Beach on the Indian Ocean. Immediately south of Coogee Beach is the Coogee Beach Caravan Park.

== Transport ==
Transperth's 548, 532 and 512 route buses pass through the suburb of Coogee, and connect it with Fremantle, Murdoch, Western Australia, Spearwood, Western Australia, Rockingham and Cockburn Central.

=== Bus ===
- 512 Fremantle Station to Murdoch Station – serves Ocean Road and Hamilton Road
- 532 Fremantle Station to Cockburn Central Station – serves Hamilton Road
- 548 Fremantle Station to Rockingham Station – serves Cockburn Road
