= Beeliar, Western Australia =

Beeliar Perth, Western Australia
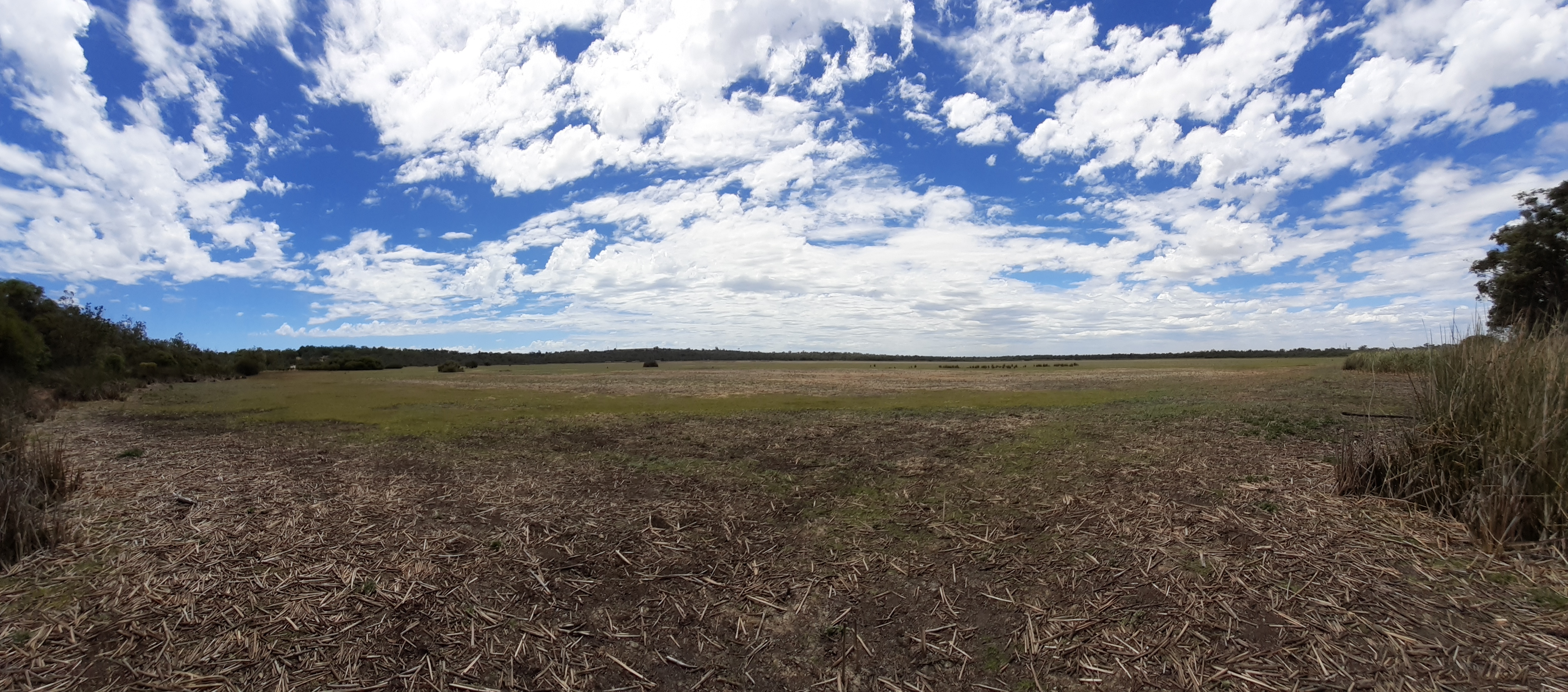
- Thomsons Lake, Beeliar
- Coordinates: 32°08′28″S 115°49′18″E
- Population: 8,617 (SAL 2021)
- Postcode(s): 6164
- Area: 11.4 km^{2} (4.4 sq mi)
- LGA(s): City of Cockburn
- State electorate(s): Cockburn
- Federal division(s): Fremantle
Suburbs around Beeliar:
Munster	Yangebup	Cockburn Central
Munster	Beeliar	Atwell
Wattleup	Wattleup	Success

Beeliar is a suburb of Perth, Western Australia, located within the City of Cockburn. The name refers to the Beeliar people, a group of Aboriginal Australians who had land rights over the southern half of Perth's metropolitan area. The suburb contains the Thomsons Lake Nature Reserve.

"Beeliar" is a Noongar word that translates to "river" or "water running through". The suburb was named after an early settler-colonialist, Robert Menli Lyon, who recorded and interacted with the local Aboriginal group in the area circa the nineteenth century. Before European contact, the suburb was occupied by the Beeliar group of the Whadjuk nation, who are part of the broader Noongar language region. The Noongar peoples have Dreaming stories related to the creation of the landforms in Beeliar and had lore that outlined the maintenance and care of the land. Oral history records and archaeology account for the Beeliar-Noongar belonging to the Beeliar suburb and its neighbouring areas.

The region of Beeliar was also included in the Swan River Colony, which was the first colony not established for convicts. The suburb was first governed by Captain James Stirling. Following Stirling's retirement, Beeliar was part of the frontier wars. Beeliar was home to Yagan and his father, Midjegoorong, who were notable figures during this period.

From the twentieth century, the suburban boundaries of Beeliar were modified gradually. Bibra Lake, which was still a feature within the Beeliar boundary during this time, was a site for the Australian Women's Army Service station during World War Two.

Since the post-war era, Beeliar has undergone several council projects, such as the Wetlands Education Centre of Cockburn (established in the 1980s), and gradually developed into a modern metropolitan suburb by the 1990s. The 1990s were when the most modern changes to the Beeliar boundaries occurred, which partially split Beeliar's region into a new suburb, Yangebup.

Since the 1990s, environmental and land rights concerns have been a local geopolitical issue. Beeliar citizens have voiced their concerns to the council about protecting the suburban geographic features, such as the various wetlands (including Thomsons Lake).

== Name meaning and early suburban parameters ==
Historically, "Beeliar" has referred to a variety of things. The settler-colonialist, Robert Menli Lyon, recorded the term "Beeliar" with a dual reference. In one context, he used the term "Beeliar" as a "district" for the region. The other use for the term was to refer to the local Aboriginal group's language. Older sources regarded the Beeliar region as the "Yagan territory on the southside of the Swan River", which is larger than the present boundaries of the suburb of Beeliar.

"Beeliar" has been translated by many to mean "river". "Beeliar Noongar" commonly refers to the "river peoples" of the Beeliar district. "Boodjar" is a Noongar term, translated as "land". Some historians regard the majority of the City of Cockburn to have been "Beeliar Boodjar", or the land of the Beeliar-Noongar. Early written sources of the Beeliar suburb show boundaries beyond the present suburb of Beeliar due to historical developments and geographic changes since European contact. Parts of Beeliar Regional Park are not within the present boundaries of the suburb, but the entire Regional Park was initially under the Beeliar suburban boundaries.

== Noongar Dreaming and creation stories ==
The Dreaming of the Noongar believes that the Waakal, the Rainbow Serpent, created the landscapes and boundaries of the regions in south-west Western Australia, including the water features (the "bilya" or "beeliar"), flora and fauna found in Beeliar's area. Historians translated parts of the Dreaming to say the local creation story was that "Waakal twisting up and down [making hills]… to Fremantle and south to Mandurah", which shaped the creation of the Beeliar Wetlands features.

Since the pre-contact era, Beeliar, as a suburban area, holds important spiritual, economic and "medicinal" value for the local Aboriginal peoples. This is partly due to wetlands having “biologically productive” soil, which led to beneficial flora and fauna to live in Beeliar.

== History ==
=== Pre-contact ===
Using the oral history transcripts and the few written records by early settler-colonialists, scholars suggest that Beeliar and its surrounding suburbs of the local council (City of Cockburn) were the lands of the Noongar/Nyungar peoples. Carbon dating has also revealed that Noongar people have occupied the area for at least 28,000 years. Specifically, at Hope Road, Beeliar Wetlands, archaeologists have found “fossiliferous chert artefacts underlying artefacts made from quartz”, which they believe to date approximately to the mid-Holocene period, and argued that there was “repeated wetland occupation” from this era.

The pre-contact Beeliar Aboriginal group spoke the Noongar language, and the geographic nation that the Beeliar people belong within is the Whadjuk nation. Historians and archaeologists have estimated the Noongar peoples to live in the Whadjuk region, including the Beeliar suburb, for "well over 40,000" years. Historians Leonard Collard and Clint Bracknell (2012) claim that the Noongar language may have "dialectic differences" across different groups due to how far the region extends over south-west Western Australia. Lyon's records also regard the local Aboriginal peoples of the Beeliar area being a distinct "language" group as well as a district. Collard and Bracknell (2012) identify through Norman Tindale's (1974) records that there were twelve "socio-dialectic groups" around the area and that "Beeliar is one clan of the Whadjuk group". Shellam (2012) identifies four dialectal groups within the Whadjuk: “Beeliar (south of Swan River), Mooro (north) and Beeloo (east)".

Noongar language region, showing the different boundaries for groups. Whadjuk is the region near Perth.

Scholars have identified the Beeliar area as having "major" sites for traditional Noongar ceremonies as well as a popular meeting area for "a number of major travel routes" between Noongar groups. Before European contact, Beeliar had "long-established trails" that connected "freshwater wetlands", which also functioned as a path to connect different Noongar groups to "social and cultural obligations", such as ceremonies, trade, and creating bush medicine. According to scholars, the different Noongar groups would travel to trade to places as far as Uluru and would commonly trade “stones and ochres and all sorts of different things” that weren't grown in Beeliar.

The Museum of Perth (n.d.) recorded that in the pre-contact era, winter rainfall would create one giant swamp, called Yoordgoorading, which "may have connected to Lake Thomson and Lake Poulett". During the hot seasons, with minimal rainfall, the land would dry, "which allowed the Noongar people to practice their traditional low-intensity firing regime in the area. Burning the area while the swamps were dried out cleared dead plants, increased water access for birds and cycled nutrients to the soil, which improved the yield and taste of plant foods eaten by Noongar people". In sum, the lands of Beeliar and its connecting suburbs were agriculturally cared for by the local Aboriginal groups.

=== Post-contact ===
==== European contact ====
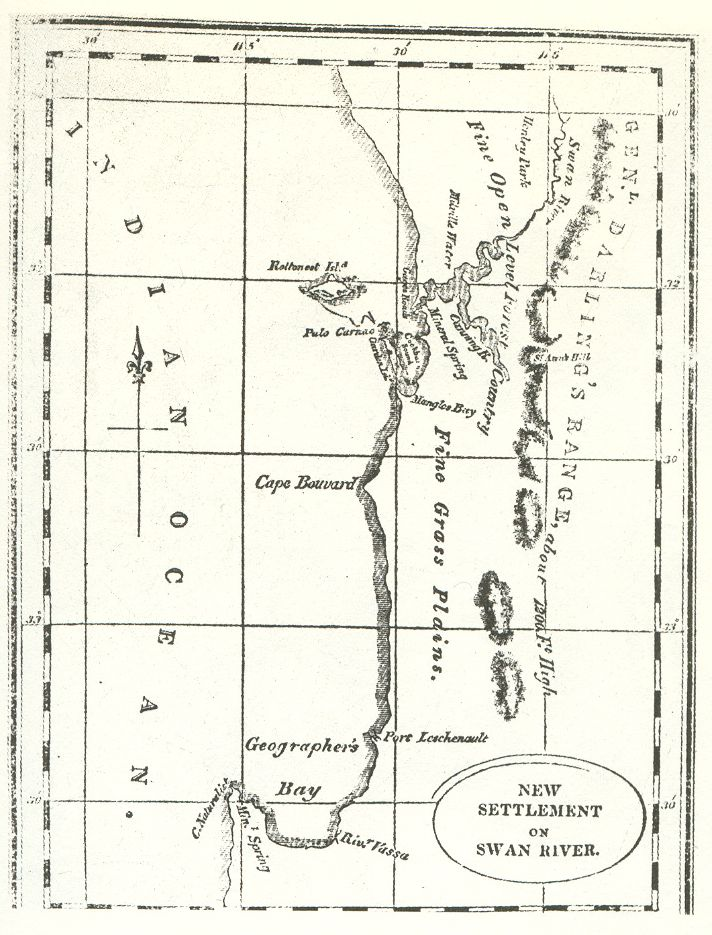
c. 1830s map of the Swan River Colony district

In 1829, the Swan River Colony was declared by Captain James Stirling. This colony's boundaries – including the future city, Perth, and the suburb, Beeliar – extended into the Whadjuk nation. This colony was the first not to be established for convicts. Stirling was the governor over the colony from 1829 to 1832 and 1834–1838. During this period, the colony did not consistently count the local Aboriginal people of the region. The inconsistent census data from this period has impacted how scholars understand the records for the following period and how this affected the Beeliar Noongar demographic.

==== Frontiers ====
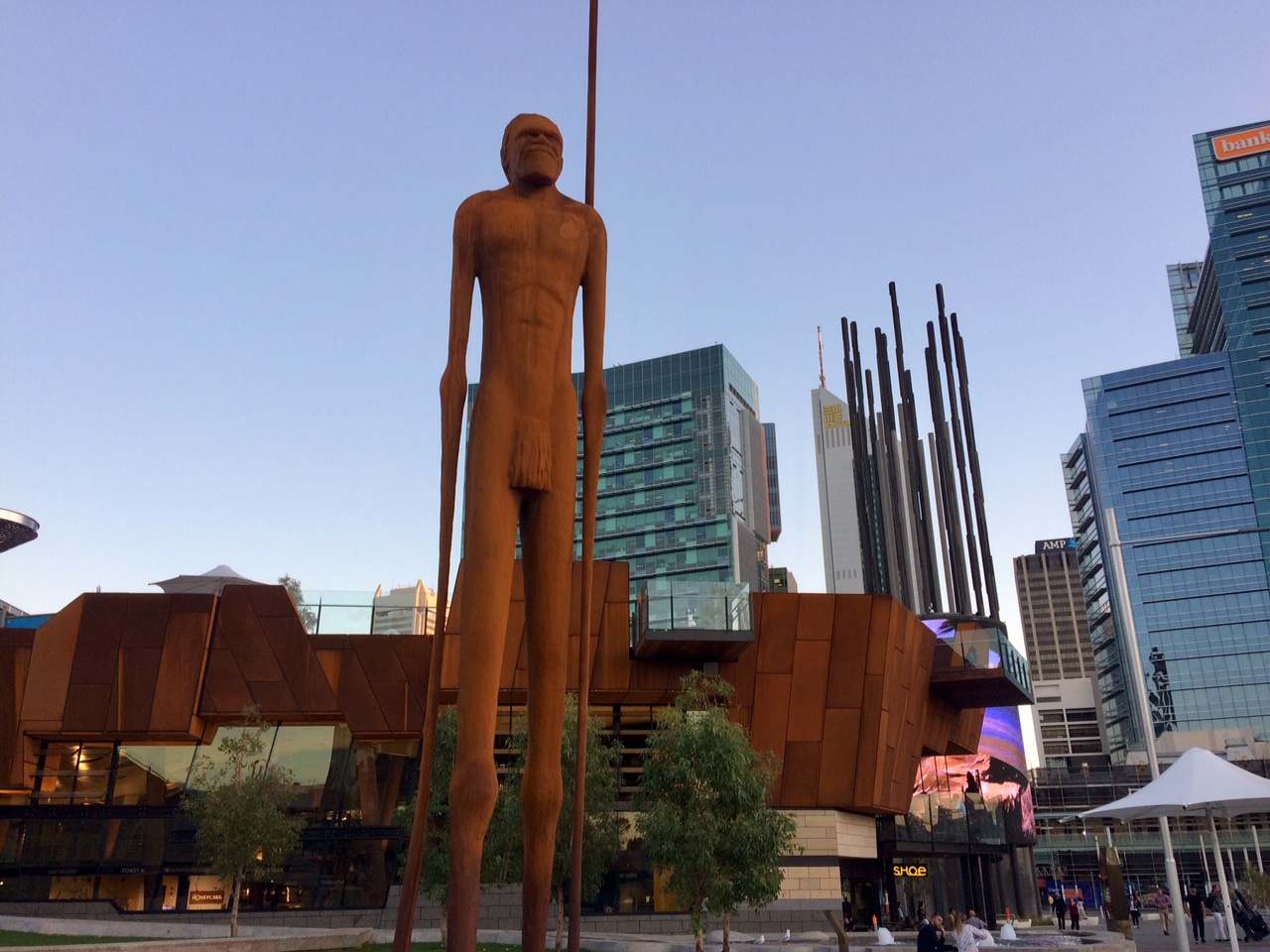
Statue in Yagan Square, Perth of the historic warrior Yagan

Frontier conflict, commonly referred to as the frontier wars, was a phenomenon that occurred across Australia, including in Beeliar. In May 1833, a Beeliar man named Midjegoorong was "executed by firing squad, without trial". Following this execution, Midjegoorong's son Yagan had a bounty imposed on him by the local government. On 15 August 1833, two local shepherds found Yagan and killed him.

==== Post-frontiers ====
A new era for the Swan River Colony emerged after Stirling resigned in 1838. During this new era, which lasted until 1860, an influx of British convicts and settlers moved to the region. The occupation of more people led to roads, infrastructure and housing being created. By extension, this led to the creation of new suburbs within the metropolitan region of Perth, such as Beeliar. Perth Gazette and Western Australian Journal writer Robert Menli Lyon, one of the first settler-colonialists from Britain, recorded the region of Beeliar as "the district of Midjegoorong" in 1833. He outlined the boundaries of this area as being "north-south from the Swan and Canning Rivers to Mangles Bay, and east-west from the sea to the Darling Scarp". It was not until the following decade that this region came to have a permanent non-Indigenous occupation.

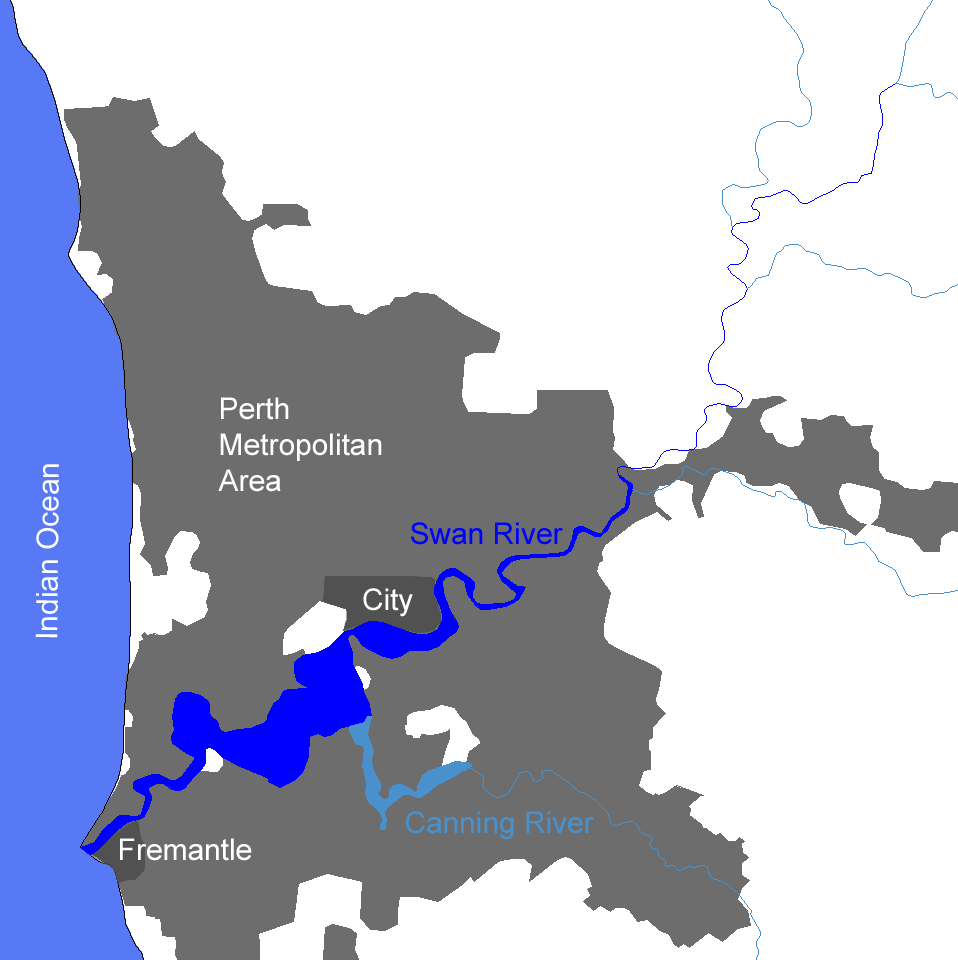
Swan River and Canning River boundaries

In the 1840s, Beeliar was officially occupied by British colonialists as a suburb. A prominent reason for Beeliar to be established as a suburb was the need to establish agriculture in response to the increase of population across the city of Perth. The Beeliar Wetlands was the prime focus for the settler-colonialists in the suburb. One of the water reserves within Beeliar Wetlands, named Bibra Lake, was initially used for "dairying and market gardening and the inevitable rubbish dumping".

==== Late nineteenth century ====
In the 1890s, the loosely defined "Beeliar" district became sectored into new suburbs. The government outlined the new boundaries southeast of Bibra Lake to be the new suburb of Jandakot. Beeliar, as a suburb, continued to be sanctioned north, west, and south of Bibra Lake, with popular markets found at "Thomsons and Kogolup Lakes" (City of Cockburn, n.d.).

==== Twentieth century ====
By 1913, after the new boundaries of Beeliar were defined, the state government installed interconnecting drains between several water features, including the Beeliar Wetlands and Thomsons Lake. Oral history records reveal that many Beeliar citizens remember a “different” state of nature in the Wetlands, claiming that the instalment of pipes led to the "semi-dryness" of the Beeliar Wetlands.

During 1930–1945, an Australian Women's Army Service station was set up next to Bibra Lake.

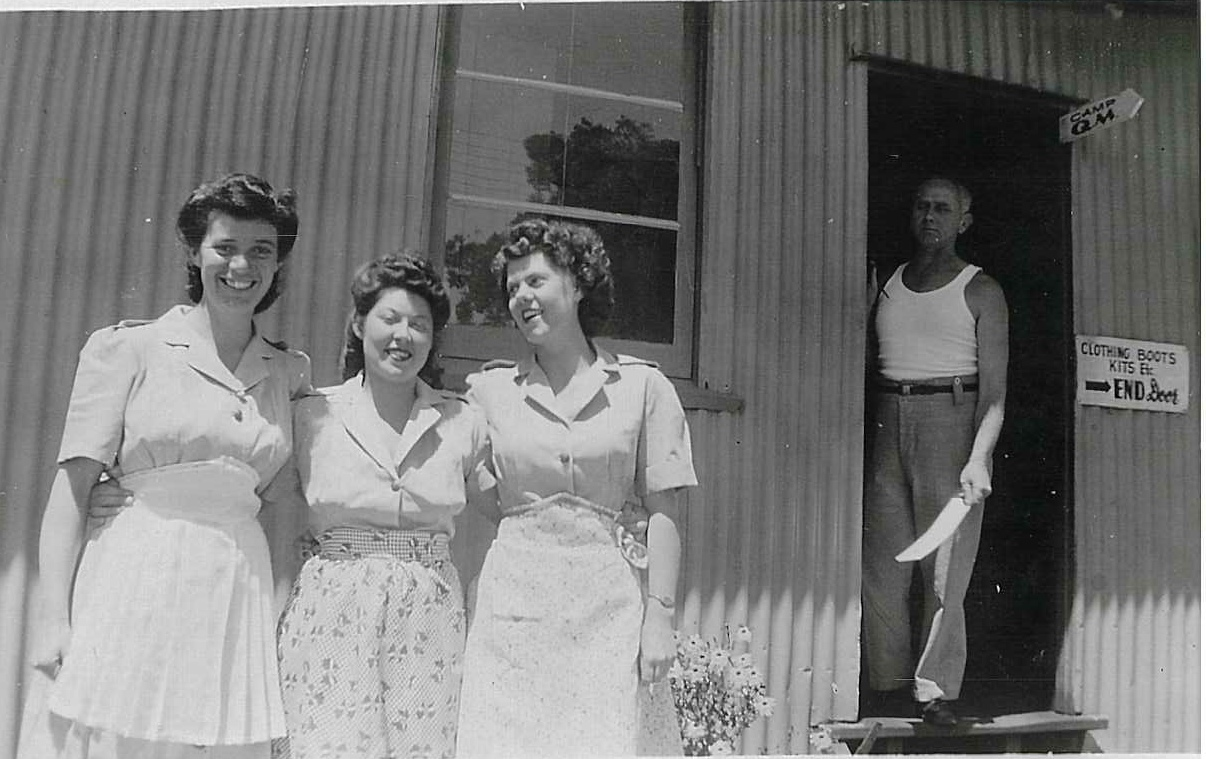
The Australian Women's Army Service station near Bibra Lake, 1944

Following the war, Bibra Lake hosted more civilian infrastructural developments. This included the eventual construction of a "water park, ice rink and skateboarding park" surrounding Bibra Lake. Scholars have found that the mid-1900s also attracted Aboriginal peoples and groups to the region to participate in the booming industry of the suburb. According to historians, Beeliar and its surrounding suburbs had "some of the first Aboriginal housing schemes" in the state.

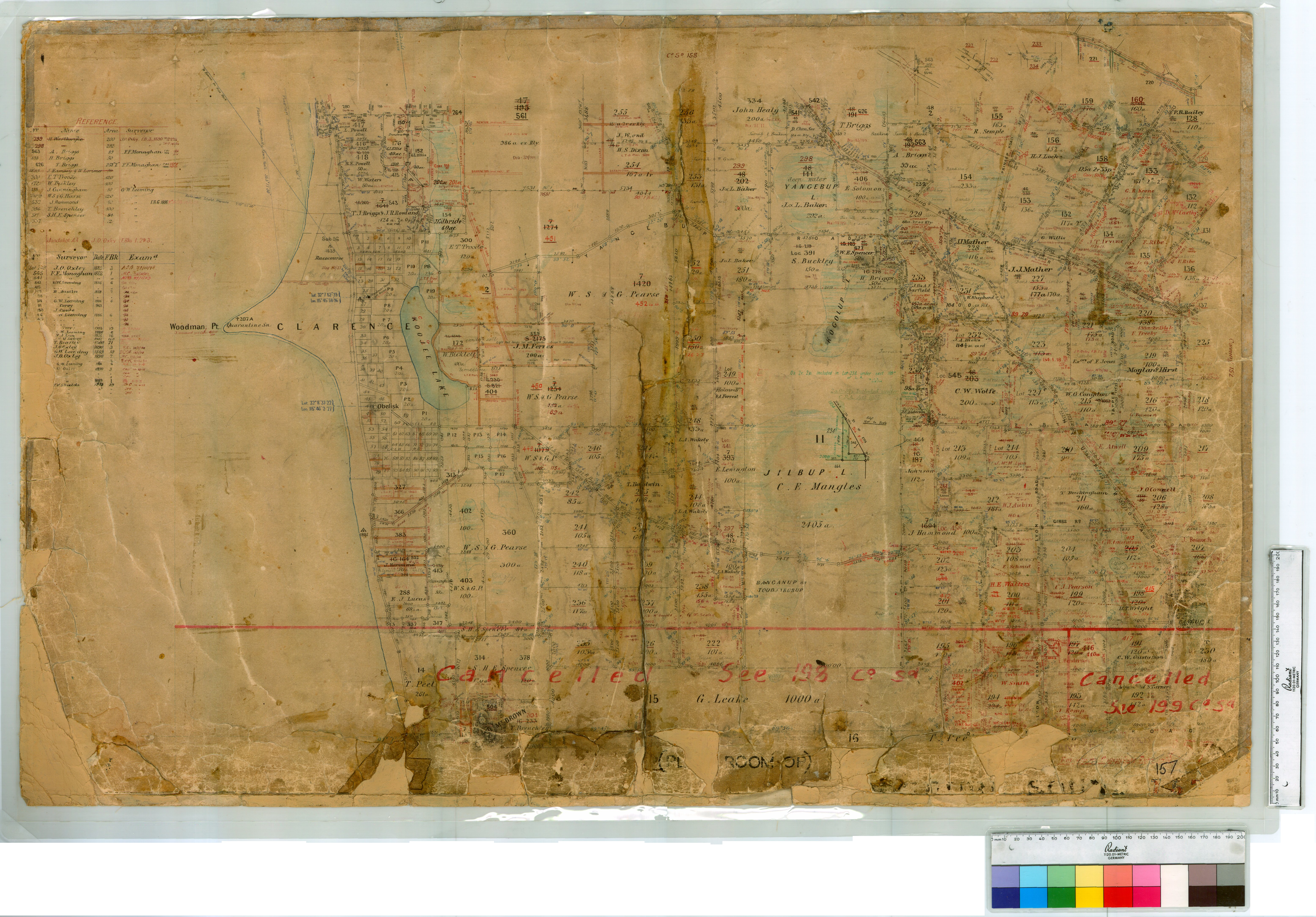
Districts of Cockburn's suburbs c. 1923

In 1967, approximately 84% of the electoral Division of Fremantle, which includes Beeliar, voted "Yes" in the referendum to allow Aboriginal people to be included in the population count.

In the 1980s, the Wetlands Education Centre of Cockburn was established. This institution relies on the sites of Beeliar Wetlands, as well as Thomsons Lake (which is located within the suburb's newer boundaries) for its research and educational excursions. Historians have claimed that the Noongar peoples of the Beeliar area continued to camp and regularly practice ceremonies “through [to] the 1980s”. In addition to the Wetlands Education centre being established in the 1980s, the state government also agreed to develop Beeliar Regional Park.

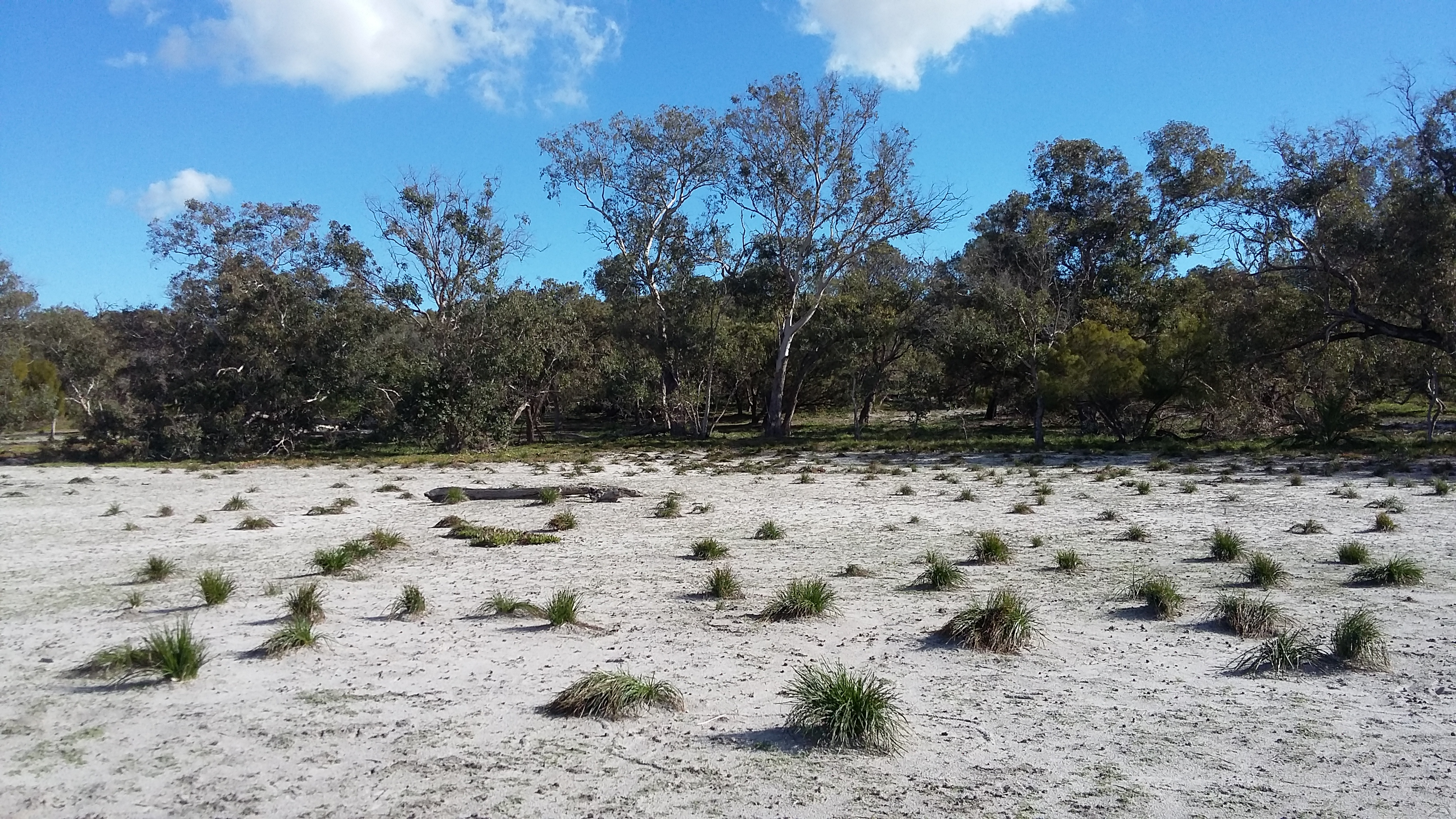
Thomsons Lake, 2016

The naming of the suburban region, Beeliar, was officially approved by the state government on 2 December 1993. However, similar to Bibra Lake, which became a separate suburb from Beeliar, the Beeliar suburban boundaries have continued to evolve and change as new suburbs are established since the mid-20th century. Two years after the approval of the name "Beeliar", the suburb was redefined again and shared the land with another suburb, named Yangebup. Beeliar Drive cuts through Beeliar Regional Park and marks the boundary between the two suburbs. Thus, only a portion of the Beeliar Regional Park still belongs within the suburb of Beeliar.

== Geographic ==
=== Nature and environment ===
Within the official council boundaries of Beeliar since the 1990s, the Beeliar Regional Park and the Beeliar Wetlands are split between Beeliar and its neighbouring suburbs, Yangebup (north) and Wattleup (south). The main road, Beeliar Drive, marks the division between the Beeliar and Yangebup. Likewise, another major road, a section of Russell Road, marks the boundary between Beeliar and Wattleup.

Beeliar's section of Beeliar Wetlands and Beeliar Regional Park include Kogolup Lake and Thomsons Lake. Thomsons Lake Nature Reserve (sometimes spelt as "Thompsons") is the largest portion of the Wetlands within Beeliar.

Smaller reserves within Beeliar are: Habitat Reserve, Hakea Reserve, Owgan Reserve, and Luttrell Gardens.

=== Environmental threats ===
The Department of Parks and Wildlife (2006) identified the following threats to Beeliar's wetlands: "Drainage, excavation and filling; Pollution including eutrophication; Water level changes; Salination; Aesthetic disruption (Section 24); Aquatic or declared weeds (Section 19); and Insect pest control (Section 21)". Of the identified threats, four have been the selected targeted areas for environmental protection: "Drainage, excavation and filling; 2. Pollution including eutrophication; 3. Water level changes; and 4. Salination". The Department (2006) reports that "406 native taxa" are found within the Beeliar features. This report also identified Thomsons Lake and Koholup Lake as Aboriginal sites under the Aboriginal Heritage Act 1972.

== Urban features ==
=== Parks and recreational sites ===
One of the two major recreational parks is Radonich Park. The facilities that are granted for public access include barbeque stations, exercise equipment, and a playground. These public facilities are located in the southeast corner of the park. Dogs are not permitted at this park. Sports features, such as goalposts, are available at this park; however, they are not permanent. The grounds, changing rooms, and toilet facilities are available for hire from the council for varying fees for private use. This park is accessible via public transport, the 530 bus route.

The other major recreational park is Beeliar Reserve. The public facilities available at this location are barbeque stations, a playground, sporting features, and toilets. Unlike Radonich Park, this park does not have exercise equipment. In addition, this park features a cricket pitch and floodlights for sporting events. Attached to the park is the Beeliar Community Centre. There are several walking tracks that cross the park. The 530 and 531 bus routes both provide service to and from Beeliar Reserve.

Smaller parks within Beeliar include: Garbin Park, Systena Park, Formosa Park, Wanarie Park, Meve Park, Touchell Park, Costa Park, Diedrich Park, Mariposa Park, Wearne Park, and Peregrine Park.

=== Community centre ===
The Beeliar Community Centre is attached to Beeliar Reserve. It has two main facilities: a main room and a meeting room. The main room seats 150 people, and the meeting room seats 50 people. Both rooms have kitchen facilities attached. One of the recurring events held at the Community Centre is the Beeliar Hub, which is for parents with children for a social meeting.

=== Schools and education facilities ===
There are two schools in Beeliar: (Note: The City of Cockburn's web site lists Emmanuel Catholic College as being in Beeliar, but according to the College's web site and Landgate it is in Success.)

- Beeliar Primary School – public
- South Coogee Primary School – public

=== Drive Thru Art Gallery ===
Three of the 30 of the Cockburn Drive Thru Art Gallery artworks are located in Beeliar. There are two murals and one sculpture. At the Beeliar Community Centre, there is street art created by Lesley King and local Beeliar young people. The other mural, by Chandy Pendergrast and Aran Cummins Devereaux (and Beeliar Residents Advancement Group and Emmanuel Catholic College), is located on the Beeliar Railway Abutment Bridge on the western end of Beeliar Drive. The final artwork is a metal sculpture depicting crops in a market garden by Dawn and Phillip Gamblen (local Croatian community representatives) installed at Spearwood Avenue.

== Transport ==
=== Bus ===
- 530 and 532 Cockburn Central Station to Fremantle Station – serve Beeliar Drive
- 531 Cockburn Central Station to Fremantle Station – serves Beeliar Drive, The Grange, Starflower Grove, Tindal Avenue, Ivankovich Avenue, Merevale Gardens, Congdon Avenue, East Churchill Avenue and Watson Road
- 534 Aubin Grove Station to Wattleup – serves Russell Road
- 549 Fremantle Station to Rockingham Station – serves Stock Road and Rockingham Road

== Demographics ==
According to the 2016 Census, 7,454 people are living in Beeliar. 1.7% identify as Indigenous Australians. There are more females than males, and the median age is 33.

One-quarter of Beeliar's residents identify as having English ancestry (25.3%). The majority were born in Australia (62.4%), with other countries of birth including England, the Philippines, New Zealand, South Africa, and Portugal. Although most of Beeliar's populace was born in Australia, only 36% had both parents born in Australia.

34.9% of Beeliar's residents affiliate with Catholicism, which is higher than the state average (21.4%).

Less than 20% of Beeliar's populace has some university qualification, which is slightly lower than the national average (22%). 22.6% of those currently studying or involved in the education system in 2016 were in public primary schools.

The census reports 2,053 families in Beeliar, with an average of 1.9 children per family with children. The average number of people per household is 2.9 people.

The majority of Beeliar's population aged 15 or over are married (52.2%), with an additional 12.4% involved in a de facto marriage. The majority of families have one parent working full-time, and the other works part-time (26.3%).

Households have, on average. 2.1 vehicles.

The majority of Beeliar's residents work full-time (59.6%), which is higher than the state average (57%). The most popular industries that they work in are hospitals (4.1%), primary education, supermarkets, aged care services, and iron ore mining.

The median household income is $2045 per week. The median monthly mortgage repayments are $2167. The median weekly rent is $400. Households with Indigenous people pay a median of $385 per week. They pay $2470 per month on mortgage repayments, which is 148% more than the national median for Indigenous Australians ($1660 per month).
