= Yangebup, Western Australia =

Yangebup Perth, Western Australia
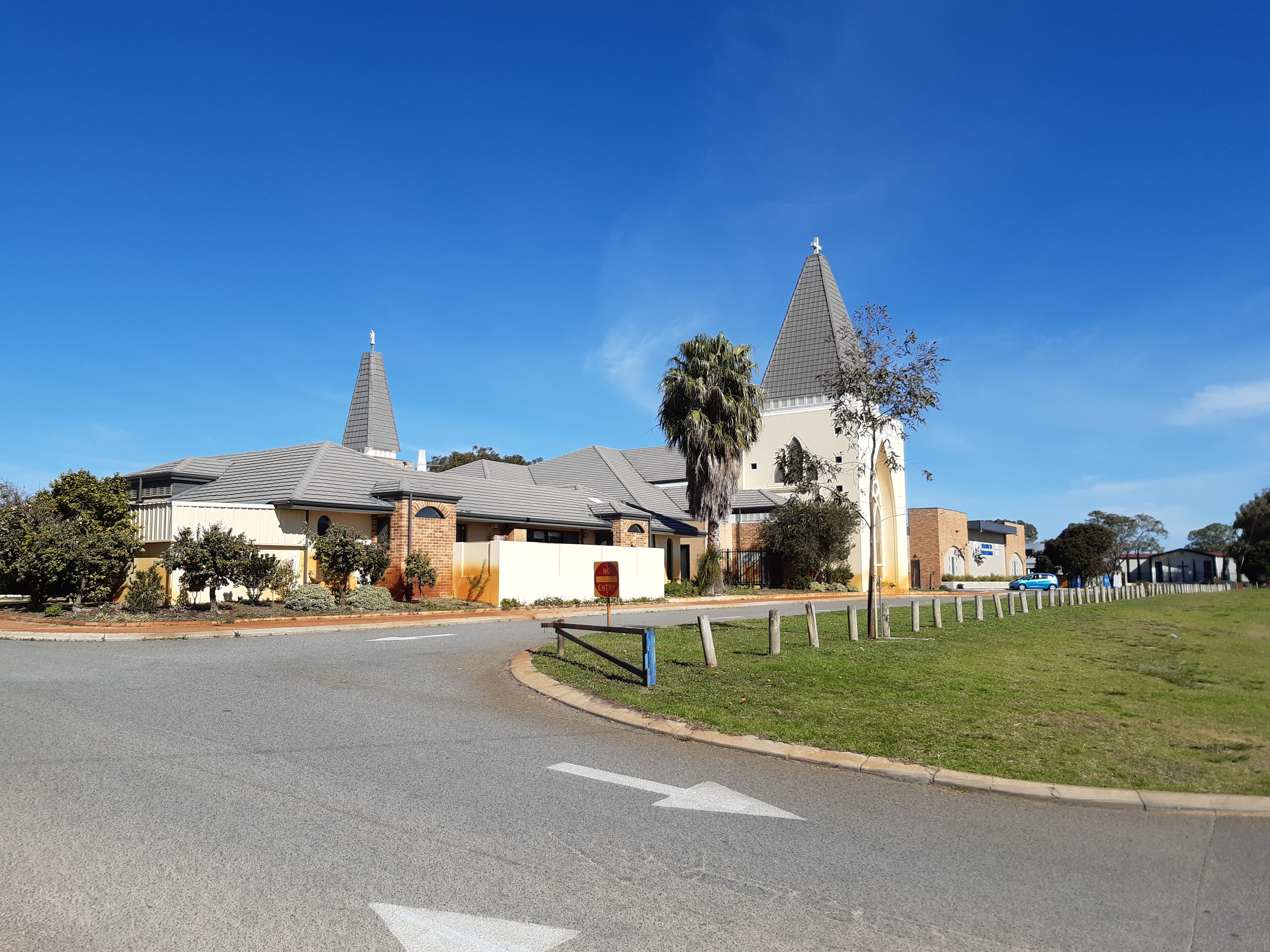
- The Mater Christi Catholic Church in Yangebup
- Coordinates: 32.129°S 115.819°E
- Population: 7,631 (SAL 2021)
- Postcode(s): 6164
- Area: 6 km^{2} (2.3 sq mi)
- Location: 26 km (16 mi) from Perth
- LGA(s): City of Cockburn
- State electorate(s): Cockburn
- Federal division(s): Fremantle
Suburbs around Yangebup:
Spearwood	Bibra Lake	South Lake
Lake Coogee	Yangebup	Cockburn Central
	Beeliar	Success

Yangebup is a southern suburb of Perth, Western Australia in the City of Cockburn. It takes its name from the nearby Yangebup Lake.

== History ==
The name Yangebup was first recorded in 1841 and may be derived from the Aboriginal word, Yanget, for the species of native flax or bullrush found around the lake. It was approved as the name for the suburb in 1977.

== Geography ==
The suburb is located 26 kilometres (16 mi) from the Perth central business district. It is bounded by the freight rail line and North Lake Road to the north, Hammond Road to the east, Beeliar Drive to the south and Stock Road to the west.

== Community services ==
=== Yangebup Progress Association ===
The Yangebup Progress Association is the local residents' group in Yangebup; it meets on a monthly basis at the Yangebup Family Centre.

=== Child health nurse ===
Yangebup also has a child health nurse clinic located at the Yangebup Family Centre, which offers a range of services for families with babies and young children.

== Facilities ==
=== Education ===
Yangebup has two primary schools: Yangebup Primary School and Mater Christi Catholic Primary School.

=== Recreation ===
Yangebup Lake and Little Rush Lake, which forms part of the Beeliar Regional Park are located within the area. There are also several local parks in the area including:

- Ronsard Park
- Visco Park
- Levi Park, which is mainly bushland and enclosed dog exercise area
- Pereena Roche Reserve, which includes a long scenic path and a small duck lake, as well as several playgrounds
- Milgun Reserve, containing several playgrounds
- Nicholson Reserve, which serves as Yangebup Primary School's oval, and is also where the local football teams have their clubrooms

=== Medical ===
Yangebup has a medical centre, chemist and dental clinic located at the shopping centre on Swallow Drive. There is also a Child Health Nurse located at the Yangebup Family Centre on Dunraven Drive.

=== Vet ===
Yangebup has a vet clinic at the shopping centre on Swallow Drive.

== Transport ==
=== Bus ===
- 514 Cockburn Central Station to Murdoch Station – serves North Lake Road
- 520 Cockburn Central Station to Fremantle Station – serves North Lake Road
- 530 Cockburn Central Station to Fremantle Station – serves North Lake Road, Osprey Drive, Yangebup Road, Mainsail Terrace, Spinnaker Heights, Birchley Road and Beeliar Drive
- 531 and 532 Cockburn Central Station to Fremantle Station – serve Beeliar Drive
