= Lake Coogee =

Lake in Perth, Western Australia

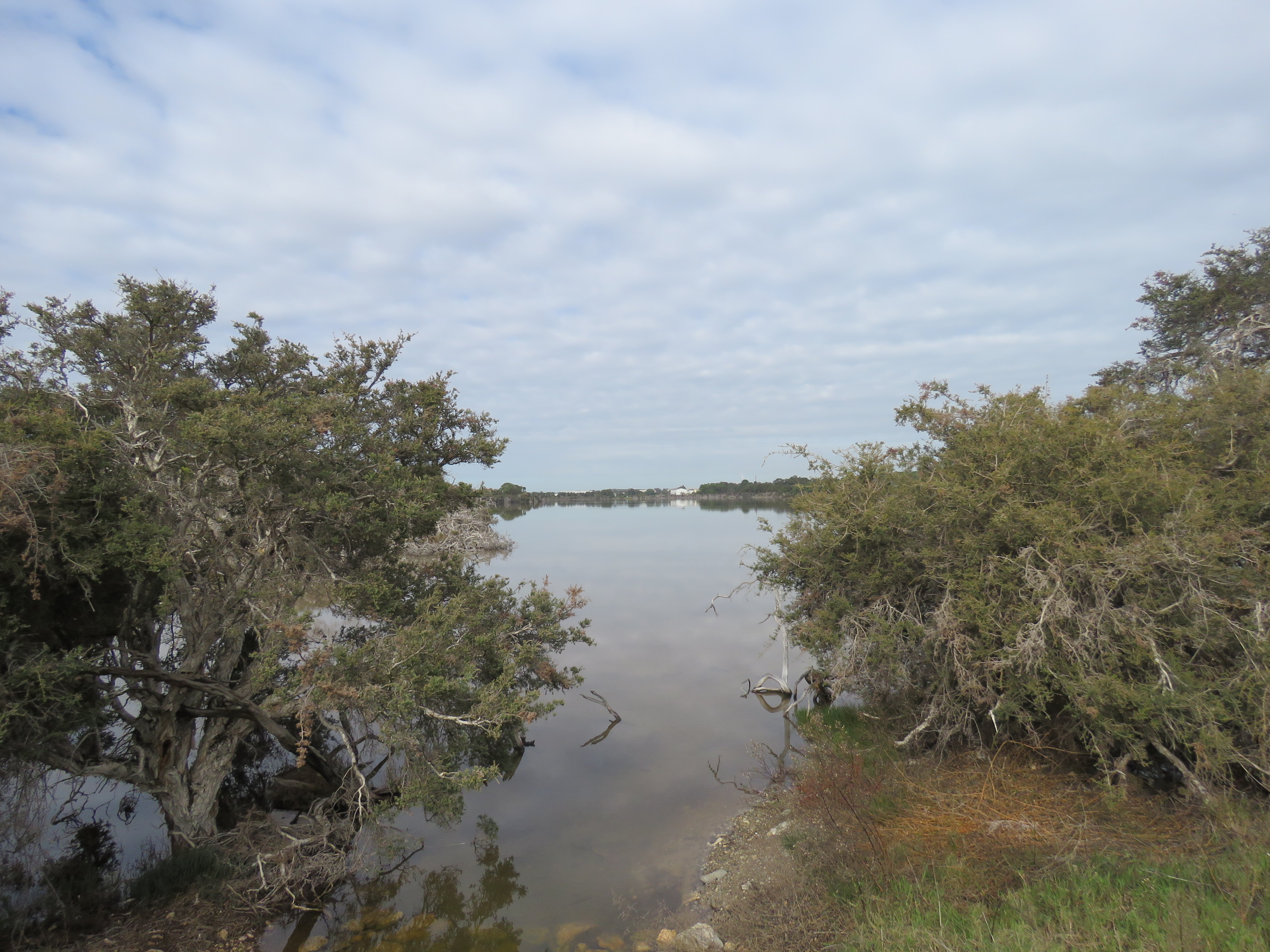
- Lake Coogee seen from the north in June 2021

- Location within Australia
- Interactive map of Lake Coogee
- Location: Lake Coogee
- Coordinates: 32°08′06″S 115°46′36″E
- Type: Saline
- Basin countries: Australia
- Designation: Beeliar Regional Park
- Surface area: 55 ha (140 acres)

Lake Coogee is a saline lake in the suburb of Lake Coogee, 21 kilometres (13 mi) south-west of the central business district of Perth, the capital of Western Australia. It is part of Beeliar Regional Park.

The lake has given its name to a number of suburbs in the area, namely Coogee, North Coogee and Lake Coogee. The lake itself was part of the suburb of Munster until 30 March 2020, when it became part of the new suburb of Lake Coogee.

== Overview ==
In the local Nyungar language, the lake was originally called Kou-Gee, which was first recorded by European settlers in 1841 and variously spelled as Koojee, Coojee and Coogee. The latter spelling was officially approved in 1955. European settlers named it Lake Munster, after Prince William, the Earl of Munster, who became King William IV in 1830.

The lake had and has mythological significance to the local indigenous people, the Noongar people, who associate it with two birds who stole fire from the moon which, in turn, caused a bushfire that was extinguished by the rising ocean, which had been called to assist by the moon. The event is associated with the drowning of Noongar people and the formation of the lake.

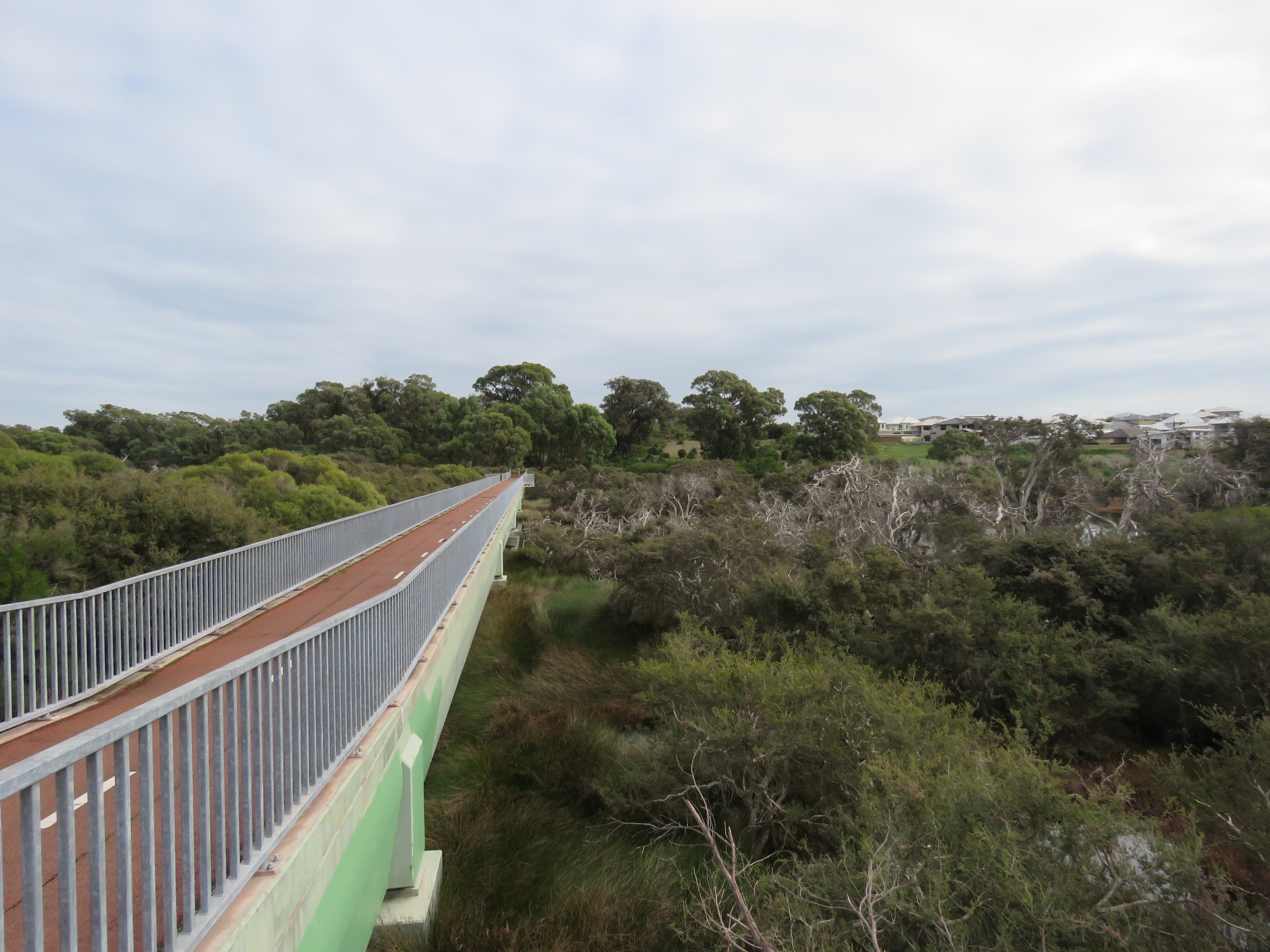
Footbridge at the northern end of the lake

Lake Coogee was formed approximately 10,000 years ago after the last ice age. Lake Coogee differs from the other lakes of the western chain of Beeliar Regional Park, being saline while the others are fresh water. Its soil is a heavy clay deposit that is presumed to have been formed by a former river outlet and estuary at the lake's location, with the depression formed by the estuary becoming the lake.

Early European settlement around Lake Coogee, from the 1830s onwards, was not very successful and generally ended in failure and the lake was generally shunned by the local Aboriginal population, too, unlike the other lakes in the area.

In modern times, the eastern and northern shore of the lake are made up of housing estates while the western shore borders land owned by the Water Corporation. A footbridge running just north of the lake, separating the lake from the Market Garden Swamp further north, was proposed in 1998 and constructed to hold sewage pipes running to the water treatment plant at the western shore.
