= Bibra Lake (Western Australia) =

Lake in Perth, Western Australia

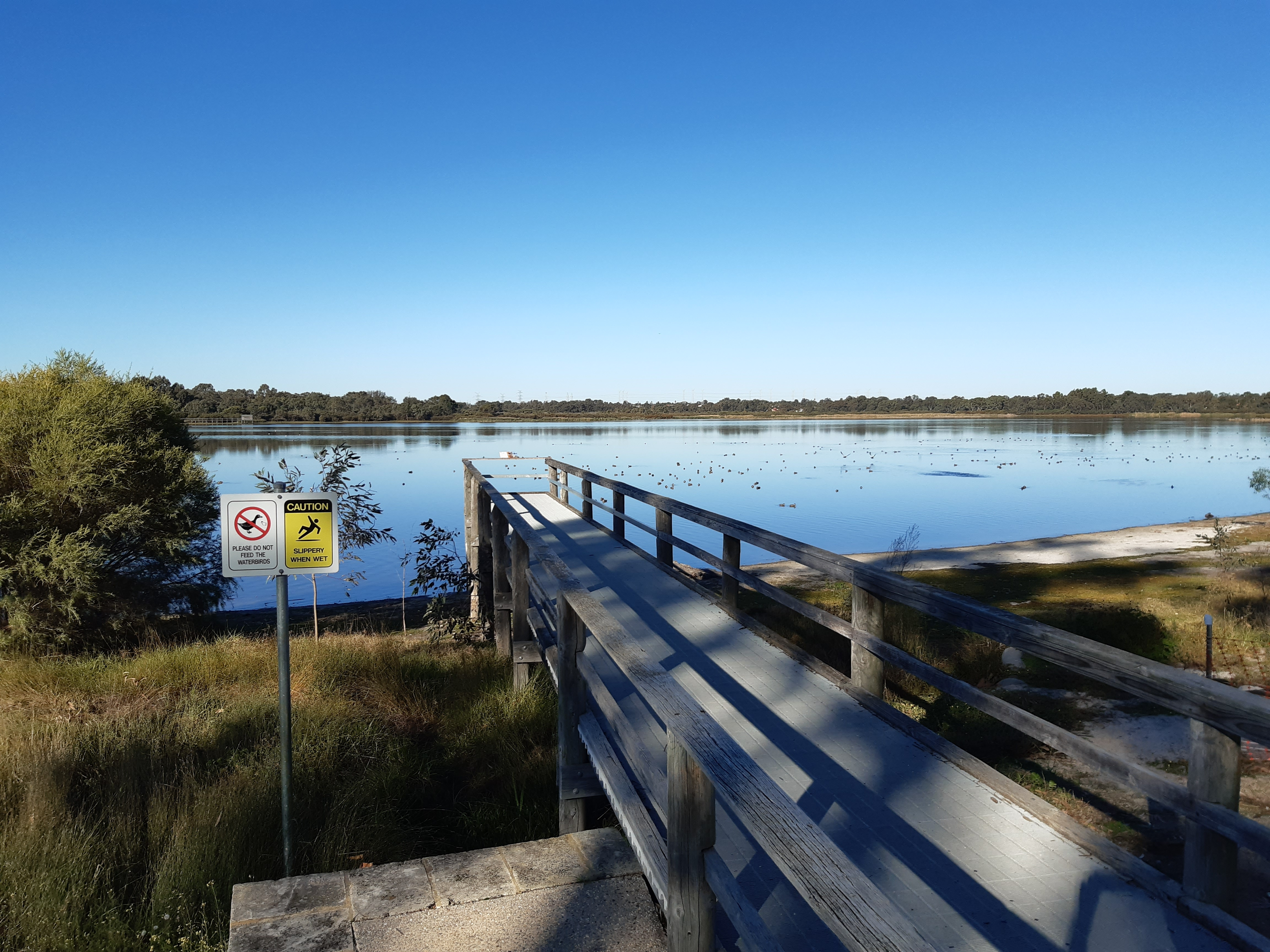
- Bibra Lake, seen from the western shore

- Location within Perth
- Interactive map of Bibra Lake
- Location: Perth, Western Australia
- Coordinates: 32°05′37″S 115°49′33″E
- Type: Freshwater
- Basin countries: Australia
- Designation: Beeliar Regional Park

Bibra Lake (Nyungar: Walliabup) is a freshwater lake in the suburb of Bibra Lake, located south of the central business district of Perth, the capital of Western Australia. The suburb and lake are located within the City of Cockburn local government area. It is bounded by the Roe Highway reservation to the north, Stock Road to the west, the Kwinana Freeway to the east and the freight rail line to the south.

Bibra Lake is the fourth lake (from north to south) of a string of lakes which combined comprise the Beeliar Regional Park. Bibra Lake contains two electric insect traps designed to reduce the number of mosquitoes in the area. A cycle way encircles the lake, which provides access to bird hides.

== See also ==
- List of lakes of Australia § Western Australia
