= South Lake, Western Australia =

South Lake
- Suburb
- Interactive map of South Lake
- Coordinates: 32.107°S 115.841°E
- Country: Australia
- State: Western Australia
- City: Perth
- LGA: City of Cockburn
- Location: 22 km (14 mi) from Perth

Government
  - State electorate: Bibra Lake
  - Federal division: Fremantle

Area
  - Total: 3.2 km^{2} (1.2 sq mi)

Population
  - Total: 5,831 (SAL 2021)
- Postcode: 6164
Suburbs around South Lake
Bibra Lake	Bibra Lake	Jandakot
Yangebup	South Lake	Jandakot
Yangebup	Cockburn Central	Jandakot

South Lake is a suburb of Perth, Western Australia within the City of Cockburn. South Lake is located approximately 22 km (14 mi) south of the Perth CBD.

== History ==
Established in the early 1980s the suburb's name was proposed by Taylor Woodrow Homes Builders and the City of Cockburn in March 1982 after a previous suggestion (Oxley) had been rejected because of duplication. It is situated to the south of North Lake, hence the name. The suburb name was approved in August 1982.

== Geography ==
It is bounded by the freight rail line to the north, the Kwinana Freeway to the east, Berrigan Drive, Semple Court and North Lake Road to the south and North Lake Road to the west.

== Facilities ==
=== Education ===
The suburb contains two schools: South Lake Primary School and Lakeland Senior High School. Lakeland Senior High School is an independent public school, offering specialised programs in music technology and touch football.

=== Recreation ===
The South Lake Leisure Centre, which contained indoor pools, gymnasium and hardball courts, adjacent to the Lakeland High School was closed and replaced by the Cockburn ARC in May 2017. The former buildings were transferred to the Department of Education.

A field hockey facility was then constructed in the area to the west of the former Leisure Centre, which is the current home of the Fremantle Hockey Club.
