= Bibra Lake, Western Australia =

Bibra Lake
- Suburb
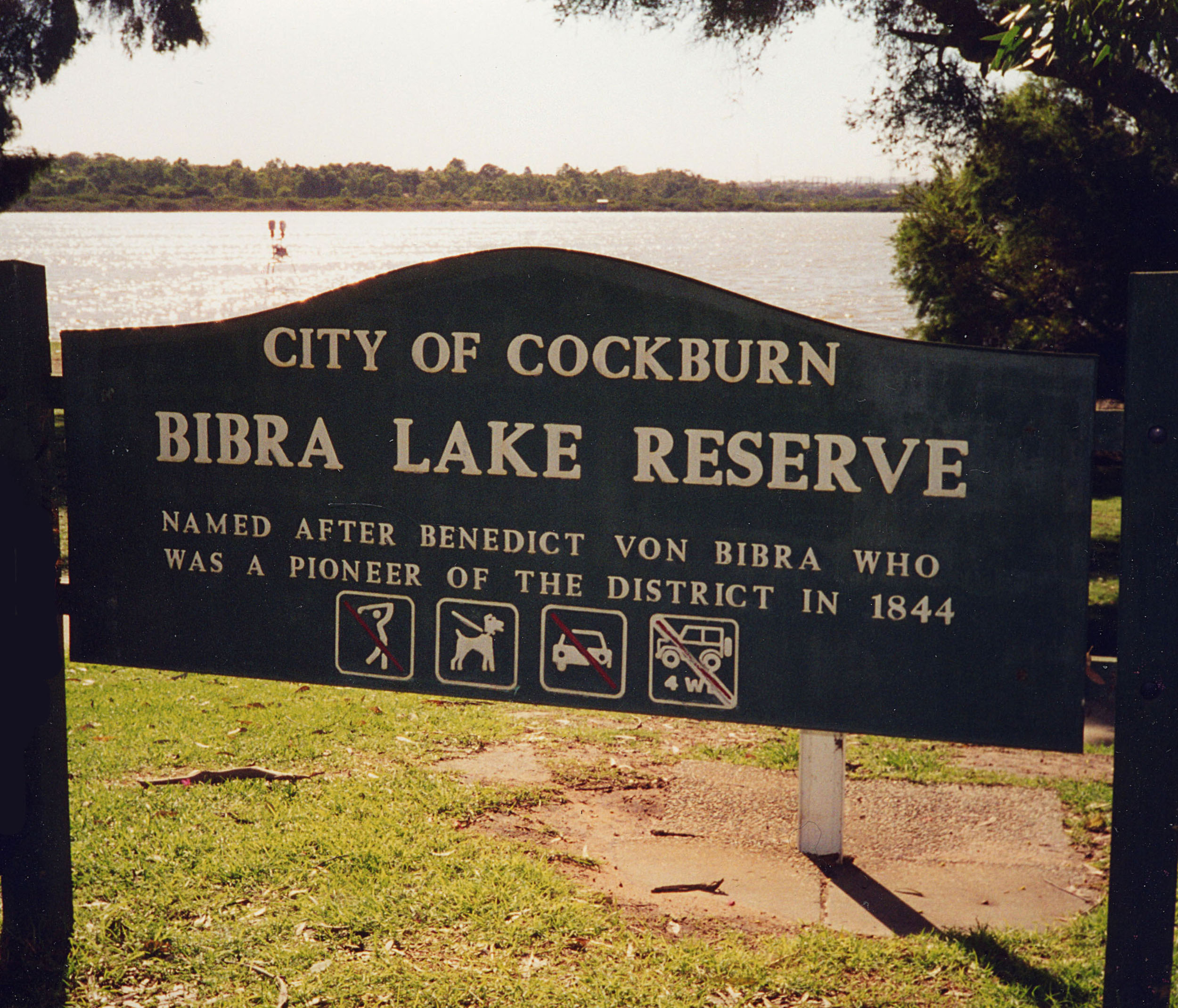
- Interactive map of Bibra Lake
- Coordinates: 32°05′57″S 115°49′07″E
- Country: Australia
- State: Western Australia
- City: Perth
- LGA: City of Cockburn
- Location: 20 km (12 mi) from Perth
- Established: 1967

Government
  - State electorate: Bibra Lake
  - Federal division: Fremantle

Area
  - Total: 12.8 km^{2} (4.9 sq mi)

Population
  - Total: 5,892 (SAL 2021)
- Postcode: 6163
Suburbs around Bibra Lake
| Hamilton Hill | North Lake | Leeming |
| Spearwood | Bibra Lake | Jandakot |
| Lake Coogee | Yangebup | South Lake |

Bibra Lake is a suburb of Perth, Western Australia; it takes its name from the extensive freshwater lake within its boundaries, Bibra Lake. It is located within the City of Cockburn and its postcode is 6163.

== History ==
The existence of the lake was first reported by Augustus Gregory during a survey of George Robb's land in May 1842. Gregory recorded the Aboriginal name of the lake as Walubup. During the following year, Benedict von Bibra, surveying his own selection on the southern shores of the lake, recorded the name as Walliabup and the latter version was used exclusively on maps for more than half a century.

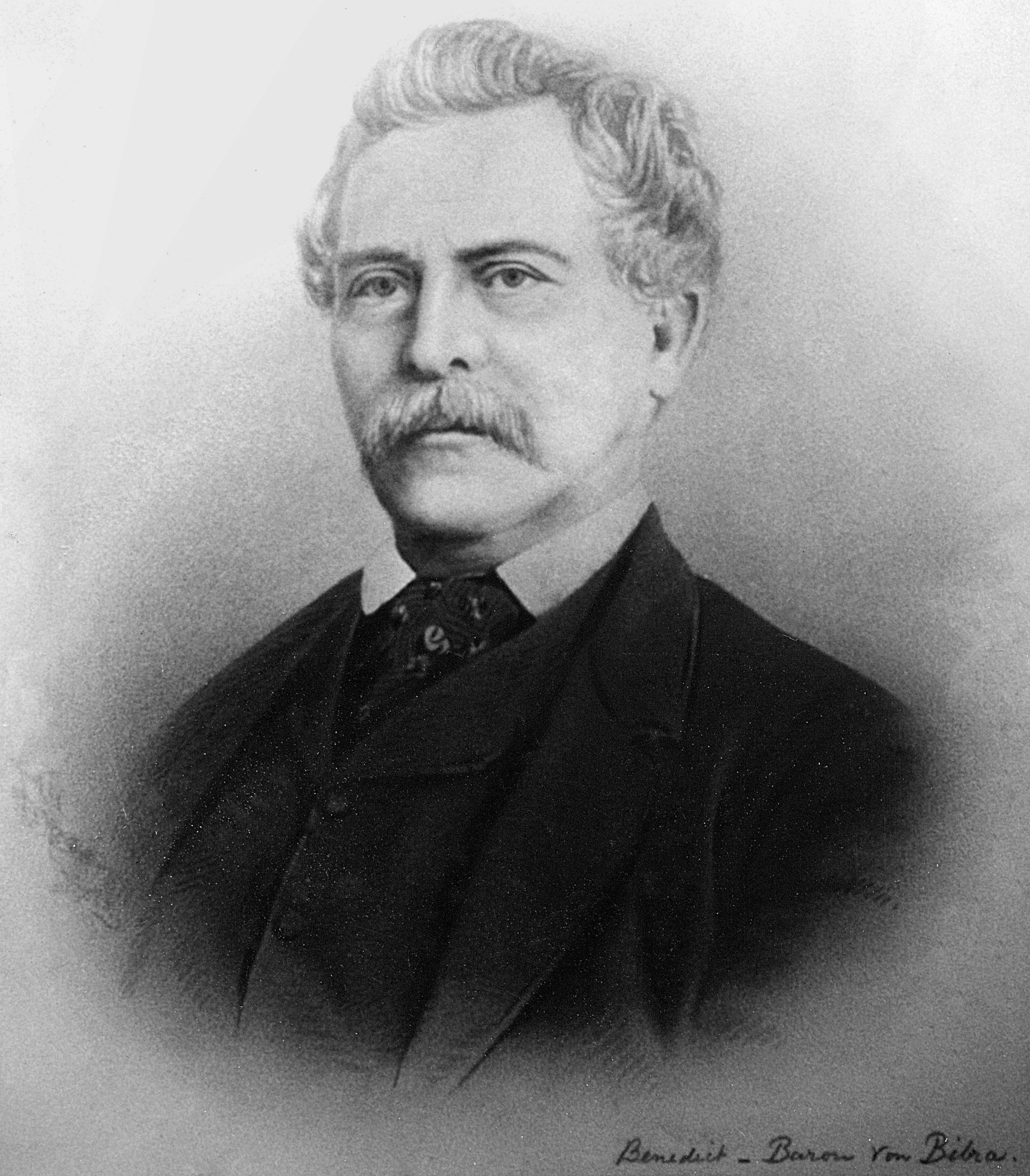
Benedict von Bibra

In the summer of 1843, Benedict von Bibra (son of Franz Ludwig von Bibra) bought land at the edge of a wide depression to use as a camping place to shorten the trip between his two carpentry businesses in Perth and Fremantle. He apparently assessed from the stringybark trees that the basin would become a lake in winter of a depth of seven to eight feet. He proved correct.

In 1877, it was found the von Bibra's association with Lake Walliabup was apparently still recalled by locals who referred to the feature as Bibra's Lake. This alternative name was added to plans and, in 1967, adopted in place of the Aboriginal name. In 1898 Bibra Lake was reserved for recreation and all applications to lease land were strenuously opposed by the Fremantle District Roads Board, which was given control of the reserve in 1902. Tearooms were erected and the Reserve became a popular venue for picnics and sports gatherings.

=== AWAS Camp ===
During World War II, there was a battery attached to the 66 Searchlight stationed at Bibra Lake, along with the regimental headquarters of the 116 Light Anti-Aircraft. This was the base for many women who served in the Australian Women's Army Service, performing important home defence duties to free up more men for front line fighting. The camp was dismantled immediately after the end of the war, and all its buildings and materials sold at auction. The camp was rediscovered in 2015 by members of the community, and was threatened by the proposed Roe Highway extension.

== Facilities ==
The majority of the suburb, which is not part of the Beeliar Regional Park contains a major light industrial area, with businesses such as Amcor.

Bibra Lake is the location for several major private recreation facilities, including Adventure World theme park, a bungee jumping tower, Cockburn Ice Arena, paintball and laser tag operations. Bibra Lake also has a Waldorf school and a Montessori primary school.

The manufacturing facilities and headquarters for OKA Australia are in Bibra Lake.

=== WA Wildlife ===
WA Wildlife, operated by Native Arc Inc, is a wildlife rescue and rehabilitation centre in the Beeliar Wetlands near Bibra Lake. It has a purpose-built hospital to care for the animals, with intensive care unit facilities to care for animals that would have previously been euthanised. WA Wildlife is part of group of organisations helping to protect the nests of the snake-necked turtle that breed around Bibra Lake. In 2020 it was estimated that 25 of the hatchlings were able to make it to the safety of the lake. Native Arc Inc is a registered charity, number 21503, licensed under the Charitable Collections Act 1946.

== Transport ==
=== Bus ===
- 512 Murdoch Station to Fremantle Station – serves Sudlow Road and Phoenix Road
- 514 Cockburn Central Station to Murdoch Station – serves North Lake Road, Bibra Drive, Walliabup Way, Meller Road, Annois Road and Parkway Road
- 520 Cockburn Central Station to Fremantle Station – serves North Lake Road, Progress Drive, Gwilliam Drive and Forrest Road
