= Munster, Western Australia =

Munster Perth, Western Australia
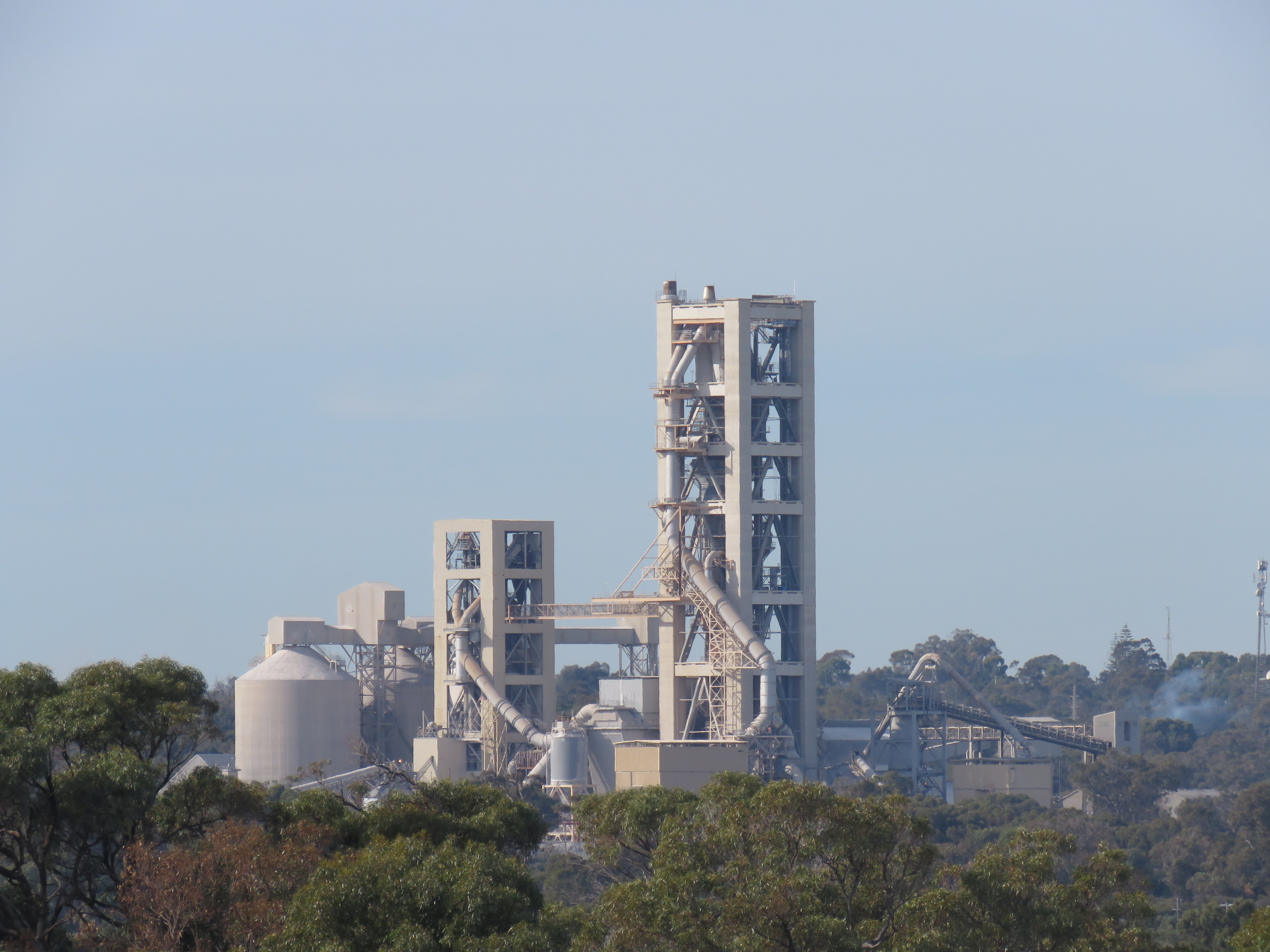
- Cockburn Cement, Munster
- Coordinates: 32.142°S 115.798°E
- Population: 199 (SAL 2021)
- Postcode(s): 6166
- Area: 4.4 km^{2} (1.7 sq mi)
- Location: 28 km (17 mi) SW of Perth
- LGA(s): City of Cockburn
- State electorate(s): Cockburn
- Federal division(s): Fremantle
Suburbs around Munster:
Lake Coogee	Beeliar	Beeliar
Henderson	Munster	Beeliar
Henderson	Henderson	Wattleup

Munster is a suburb of Perth, Western Australia, located within the City of Cockburn.

== History ==
The suburb was named in 1954 from the original name of Lake Coogee, being Lake Munster, which was named after Prince William, Earl of Munster, and later King William IV. The district had been known as South Coogee since the 1870s and this earlier name remains in use by older settlers of the area. The district contains the site of Thomas Peel's original settlement, the Clarence townsite, the first recorded land grants in the Cockburn area, and around Lake Coogee the remains of the cottages built by the Pensioner Guards in the 1880s. The Munster district is unique in the continuous occupation of the Anderson, Newman, and Sawle properties by those families since the last century.

In 1895 a postal directory mentioned that the suburb of Lake Munster was "also known as Coogee". In later years this name was applied more to the area north-west of the lake, while the rest of the area became known for postal purposes as Woodman Point and South Coogee in the 1950s. Munster was officially adopted as a suburb name in 1954.

In 2019, the City of Cockburn approved a split of Munster, whereby the north-western part of the suburb became the new suburb of Lake Coogee while another part, in the south-west, was added to the suburb of Henderson. Only the eastern part of Munster remained part of the existing suburb. The changes came into effect on 30 March 2020.

== Geography ==
The suburb is bounded by Fancote Avenue to the north, Lorimer and Henderson Roads to the east, Russell Road to the south and Rockingham Road to the west.

The suburb contains the Cockburn Cement works, which has a significant impact on the surrounding land use (restricting the residential growth of the area). The Australian Marine Complex was, until 2020, also partially located within the southern portion of the suburb, primarily the Technology Precinct (which includes Raytheon Australia, and a new TAFE facility - Australian Centre for Energy and Process Training (ACEPT) - South Metropolitan TAFE).

== Transport ==
=== Bus ===
- 549 Fremantle Station to Rockingham Station – serves Rockingham Road
