= Cockburn Central, Western Australia =

Cockburn Central
- Suburb
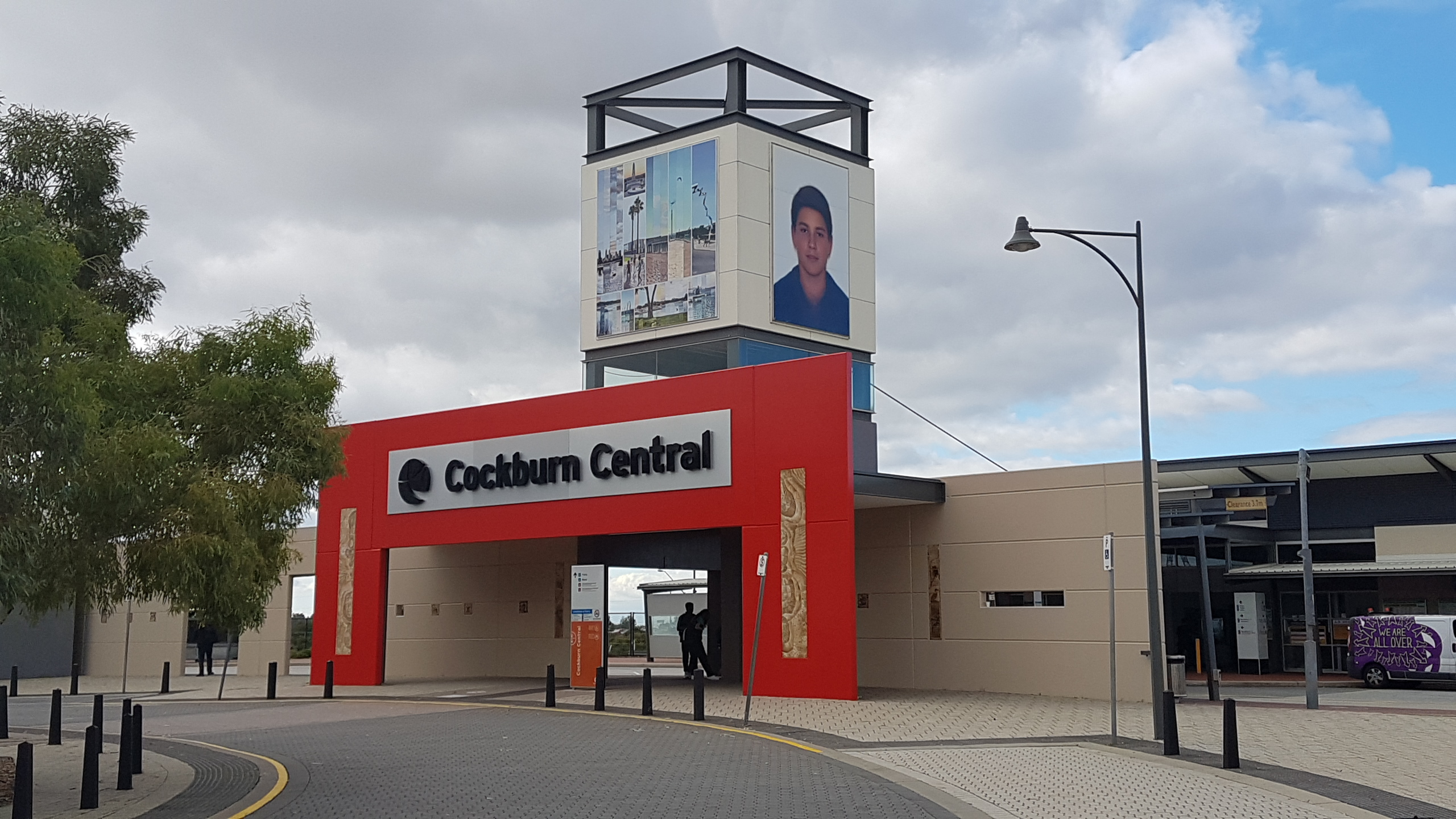
- Cockburn Central railway station entrance
- Interactive map of Cockburn Central
- Coordinates: 32.121°S 115.848°E
- Country: Australia
- State: Western Australia
- City: Perth
- LGA: City of Cockburn
- Location: 24 km (15 mi) S of Perth
- Established: 2007

Government
  - State electorate: Cockburn
  - Federal division: Fremantle

Area
  - Total: 2.8 km^{2} (1.1 sq mi)

Population
  - Total: 1,521 (SAL 2021)
- Postcode: 6164
Suburbs around Cockburn Central
South Lake	South Lake	Jandakot
Yangebup	Cockburn Central	Jandakot
Beeliar	Success	Atwell

Cockburn Central (/ˈkoʊbərn/ KOH-bərn) is a suburb of Perth, the capital city of Western Australia, and is 24 kilometres (15 mi) south of Perth's central business district (CBD) along the Kwinana Freeway. Its local government area is the City of Cockburn, and it is intended by the Government to serve as a regional centre for the area. It was approved as a name by the Geographic Names Committee in 2007.

The new suburb came into existence after the newly constructed Kwinana Freeway cut off the western portion of Jandakot from the main part of the suburb, with the section west of the freeway becoming Cockburn Central.

It contains a new town centre focussed around the railway station, with the state headquarters of the Department of Fire and Emergency Services, a district police station, Cockburn ARC (a regional aquatic and recreation centre, which also houses the administration and training facilities for the Fremantle Football Club), Cockburn Gateway shopping centre (which, despite the name, is located in neighbouring Success), high rise residential apartments and an older industrial area.
