= Rockingham Road, Perth =

Road in Perth, Western Australia

Rockingham Road Western Australia
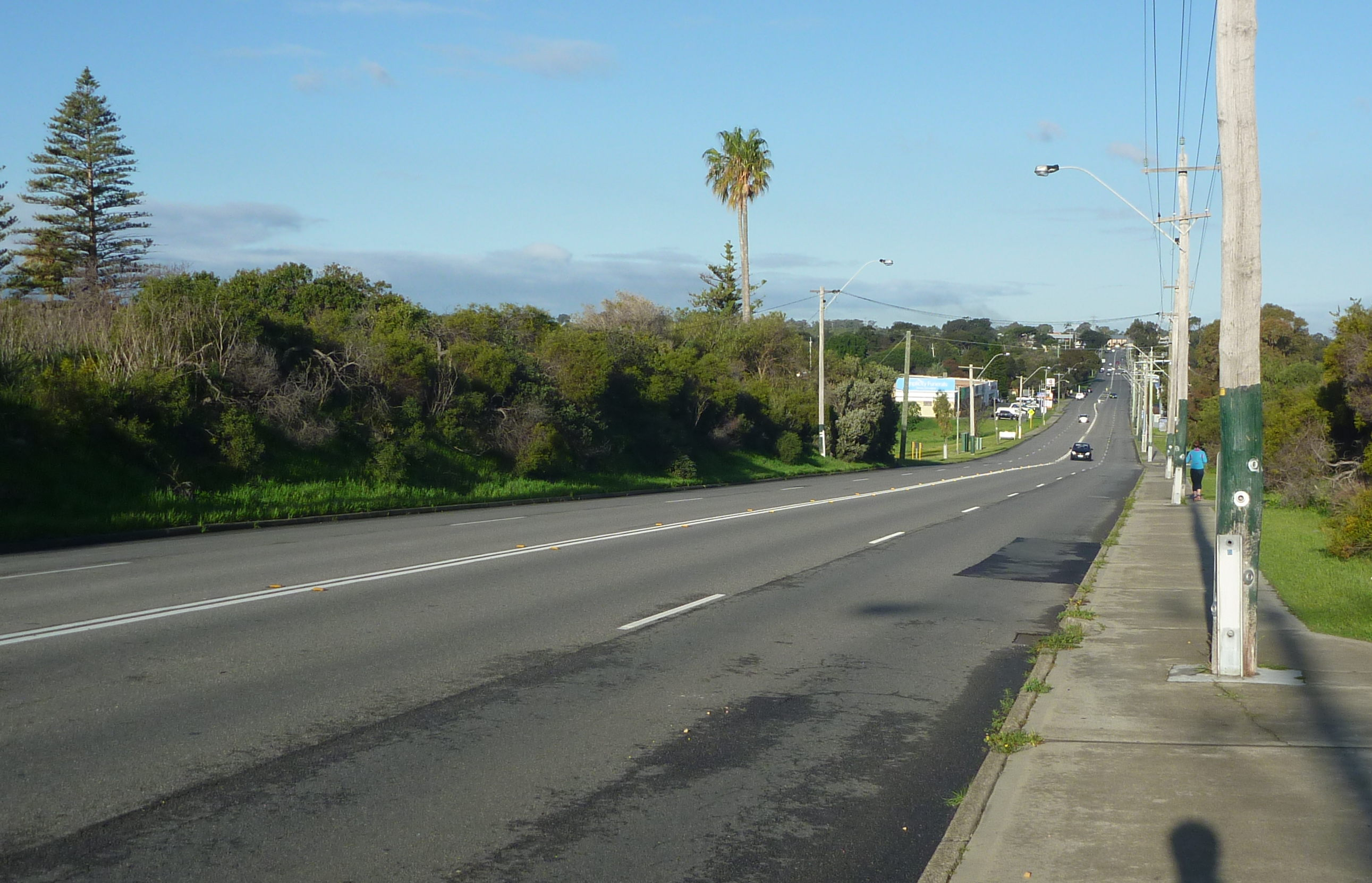
- Rockingham Road in Hamilton Hill

General information
- Type: Highway
- Length: 20 km (12 mi)
- Route number(s): National Route 1 (South of Stock Road)

Major junctions
- North end: Hampton Road, South Fremantle
- Stock Road (National Route 1); Thomas Road (State Route 21)
- South end: Patterson Road (National Route 1), Kwinana Beach

Location(s)
- Major suburbs: Hamilton Hill, Spearwood, Munster, Wattleup, Naval Base

Highway system
- Highways in Australia; National Highway • Freeways in Australia; Highways in Western Australia

Rockingham Road is a major road between Fremantle and Kwinana in the southern suburbs of Perth. It is allocated National Route 1 – part of Australia's national Highway 1 – between Stock Road in Munster and its southern terminus in Kwinana.

The first part of Rockingham Road is a main road and suburban distributor that goes from the southern edge of Fremantle into Hamilton Hill and Spearwood, passing the Phoenix Park shopping centre and the offices of the City of Cockburn. It then leaves the urban area (but not the metropolitan area).

After becoming Highway 1, Rockingham Road acquires a very wide median strip - at one point the northbound and southbound lanes are 180 metres apart. The road then passes the small towns of Wattleup and Hope Valley before entering the Kwinana heavy industrial area in Naval Base and Kwinana Beach.

After the intersection with Mandurah Road it changes name to Patterson Road and continues on to the city of Rockingham.

== Major intersections ==
All intersections below are controlled by traffic signals unless otherwise indicated.

LGA	Location	km	mi	Destinations	Notes
Fremantle–Cockburn boundary	Beaconsfield–Hamilton Hill–South Fremantle tripoint	0	0.0	Hampton Road (north) / Cockburn Road (south) (State Route 12) – Fremantle, Coogee, Henderson	Northwestern terminus at signalised T-junction
Cockburn	Hamilton Hill	1.2	0.75	Forrest Road – Coolbellup, Bibra Lake	Unsignalised LILO junction
Cockburn	Hamilton Hill	1.7	1.1	Carrington Street (north) / Hamilton Road (south) – Hilton, Palmyra, Lake Coogee	
Cockburn	Hamilton Hill–Spearwood boundary	2.8	1.7	Phoenix Road – Bibra Lake	Planned to be converted to a roundabout
Cockburn	Spearwood	3.1	1.9	Lancaster Street	
Cockburn	Spearwood	3.8	2.4	Spearwood Avenue (State Route 14) – North Coogee, Bibra Lake, Yangebup	
Cockburn	Lake Coogee	6.7	4.2	Mayor Road (west) / Beeliar Drive (east) – Coogee, Beeliar, Cockburn Central, Armadale	Roundabout. Beeliar Drive replaced a connection to Yangebup Road in 2009
Cockburn	Beeliar–Lake Coogee boundary	7.8	4.8	Stock Road (National Route 1) north – Hilton, O'Connor, Bicton	Unsignalised T-junction. Northbound traffic turns left, southbound traffic turns right. National Route 1 northern concurrency terminus
Cockburn	Munster–Wattleup–Henderson tripoint	8.8– 9.0	5.5– 5.6	Russell Road – Fremantle, North Coogee, Success, Atwell	Staggered signalised intersections favouring Rockingham Road.
Cockburn	Wattleup–Henderson boundary	12.4	7.7	Wattleup Road – Wattleup, Hammond Park, Aubin Grove	Unsignalised T-intersection. Access to Kwinana Freeway via Rowley Road
Kwinana	Hope Valley–Naval Base boundary	14.1	8.8	Hope Valley Road – Hope Valley	Unsignalised T-intersection.
Kwinana	Naval Base	14.7	9.1	Cockburn Road (State Route 12) – Henderson, Coogee	
Kwinana	Naval Base	16.0	9.9	Beard Street (west) / Lee Road (east)	
Kwinana	Naval Base–Hope Valley–Kwinana Beach tripoint	16.5	10.3	Anketell Road – Postans, Anketell, Oakford	
Kwinana	Kwinana Beach–Medina boundary	18.3	11.4	Thomas Road (State Route 21) – Orelia, The Spectacles, Casuarina, Byford	Access to Tonkin and South Western Highways
Kwinana	Kwinana Beach	20	12	Mason Road north/Mandurah Road south – East Rockingham, Kwinana Beach, Baldivis, Karnup	Southern terminus, continues as Patterson Road (National Route 1) southbound. Staggered signalised T-intersections favouring Rockingham and Patterson Roads. No right turn possible between Patterson Road northbound and Mandurah Road southbound
Incomplete access; Route transition
