= Hampton Road =

Road in Fremantle, Western Australia

Hampton Road Western Australia
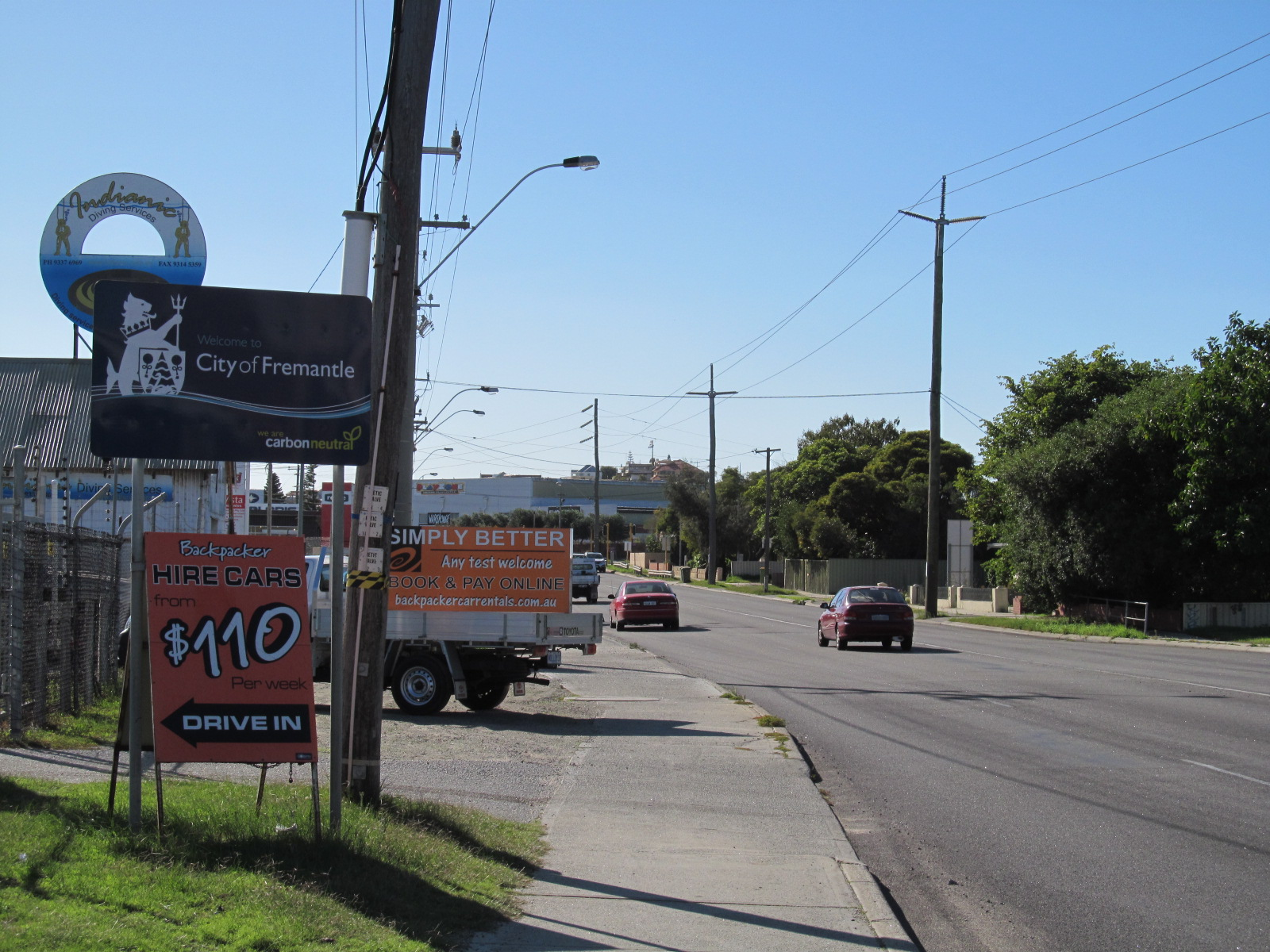
- Hampton Road at the southern end, looking north from the Rockingham Road and Cockburn Road intersection.

General information
- Type: Road
- Length: 2.9 km (1.8 mi)
- Route number(s): State Route 12

Major junctions
- North end: Ord Street (State Route 12), Fremantle
- South Street (State Route 13); Rockingham Road
- South end: Cockburn Road (State Route 12), South Fremantle

Location(s)
- Major suburbs: South Fremantle, Beaconsfield

Hampton Road is the main road entering the City of Fremantle from the south. It is named after John Stephen Hampton, the Governor of Western Australia from 1862 to 1868. It continues into Ord Street at the north east corner of Fremantle Prison at Knutsford Street.

Heritage buildings and operations in historical properties occur along the length of the road; they include the Fremantle Children's Literature Centre, Hampton Road reserve, Bundi Kudja, and St Pauls Anglican Church in Beaconsfield.

At the Cockburn Road and Rockingham Road intersection, which forms the southern terminus of the road, traffic bound for Fremantle arrives from Spearwood and Kwinana further south, and is brought through a high-density residential area, and past Fremantle Hospital and Fremantle Prison, two of Fremantle's landmarks.

== Major intersections ==
All intersections below are controlled by traffic signals unless otherwise indicated.

LGA	Location	km	mi	Destinations	Notes
Fremantle	Fremantle	0	0.0	Stirling Street northwest / Knutsford Street west – Fremantle, North Fremantle	Un-signalised intersection, Knutsford Street is left-in only. Continues as Ord Street (State Route 12) north
Fremantle	Fremantle	1	0.62	Wray Avenue – Fremantle	Access to Fremantle Hospital emergency entrance and the CBD from the south
Fremantle	Fremantle–Beaconsfield–South Fremantle tripoint	1.1	0.68	South Street (State Route 13) – O'Connor, Kardinya, Murdoch, Canning Vale	Access to Murdoch University
Fremantle	Beaconsfield–South Fremantle boundary	1.6	0.99	Lefroy Road – Hilton	
Fremantle	Beaconsfield–South Fremantle boundary	2.3	1.4	Douro Road – Fremantle	Connects to southern end of Marine Terrace
Fremantle	Beaconsfield–South Fremantle boundary	2.6	1.6	Clontarf Road – Hamilton Hill	
Fremantle–Cockburn boundary	Beaconsfield–Hamilton Hill–South Fremantle tripoint	2.8	1.7	Rockingham Road – Hamilton Hill, Spearwood, Kwinana Beach	Continues south as Cockburn Road (State Route 12) to Coogee and Henderson Industrial Estate
Incomplete access
