= South Street (Perth, Western Australia) =

Road in Perth, Western Australia

South Street Western Australia
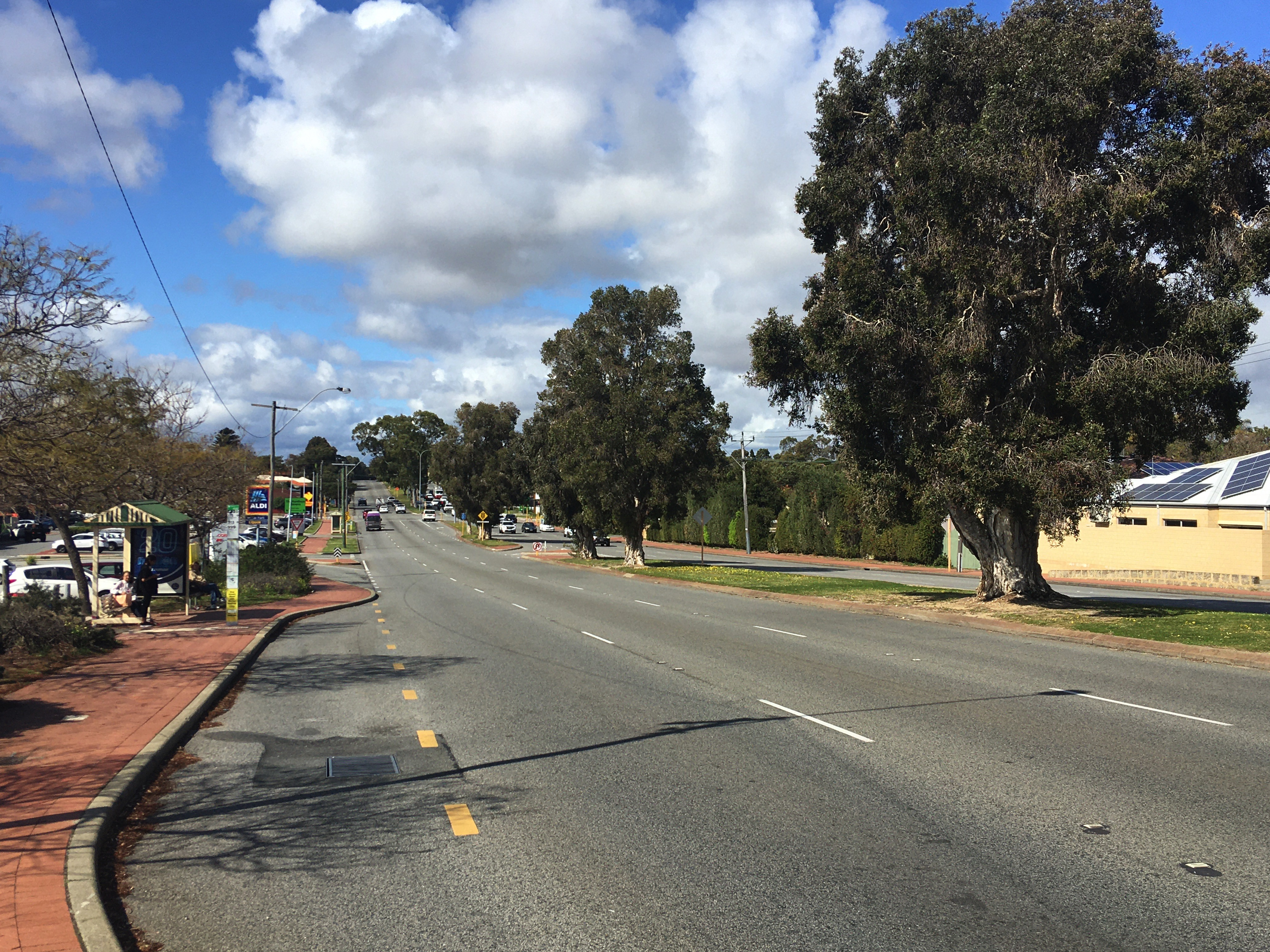
- South Street facing east near North Lake Road

General information
- Type: Highway
- Length: 14 km (8.7 mi)
- Route number(s): State Route 13

Major junctions
- East end: Ranford Road (State Route 13)
- Roe Highway (State Route 3); Kwinana Freeway (State Route 2); Stock Road (National Route 1); Hampton Road (State Route 12)
- West end: Marine Terrace

Location(s)
- Major suburbs: Canning Vale, Leeming, Murdoch, Kardinya, O'Connor, Beaconsfield, Fremantle

Highway system
- Highways in Australia; National Highway • Freeways in Australia; Highways in Western Australia

South Street is an east–west arterial highway in the southern suburbs of Perth, Western Australia. It runs from Canning Vale to Fremantle, and is part of State Route 13.

Notable locations along South Street include:

- Murdoch railway station
- Murdoch University main campus
- Fiona Stanley Hospital
- St John of God Murdoch Hospital

A section of South Street between Kwinana Freeway and Vahland Avenue has one lane in each direction reserved as a bus lane during peak times. The CircleRoute bus route runs along part of South Street between Fremantle and Murdoch.

It is named South Street because its westernmost portion forms the southern edge of Fremantle.

== Major Intersections ==
All intersections listed are controlled by traffic signals unless otherwise indicated.

LGA	Location	km	mi	Destinations	Notes
Fremantle	Fremantle–South Fremantle boundary	0.00	0.00	Marine Terrace	Western terminus at unsignalised T-junction
Fremantle	Fremantle–South Fremantle boundary	0.2	0.12	South Terrace	
Fremantle	Fremantle–Beaconsfield–South Fremantle tripoint	0.6	0.37	Hampton Road (State Route 12) – Fremantle, North Coogee, Henderson	State Route 13 northwestern terminus
Fremantle	White Gum Valley–O'Connor–Hilton–Beaconsfield quadripoint	2.8	1.7	Carrington Street – Bicton, Palmyra, Hamilton Hill	
Fremantle	O'Connor–Samson–Hilton tripoint	4.1	2.5	Stock Road (National Route 1) – Attadale, Melville, Kwinana Beach, Rockingham	
Fremantle	O'Connor–Samson boundary	4.2	2.6	McCombe Avenue	
Melville	Kardinya	6.2	3.9	North Lake Road – Alfred Cove, Myaree, Bibra Lake, Cockburn Central	
Melville	Kardinya	6.6	4.1	Gilbertson Road	
Melville	Bateman–Murdoch boundary	8.9	5.5	Murdoch Drive – Booragoon, Winthrop, North Lake	Access to Murdoch University, Fiona Stanley and St John of God Murdoch Hospitals
Melville	Bateman–Bull Creek–Leeming–Murdoch quadripoint	9.6– 10.0	6.0– 6.2	Kwinana Freeway (State Route 2) – Perth, Joondalup, Rockingham	Modified diamond interchange favouring Kwinana Freeway: northbound exit ramp looped. Access to Murdoch railway station on eastern side.
Melville	Bull Creek–Leeming boundary	10.3	6.4	Calley Drive	Access to Stockland Bull Creek Shopping Centre
Melville	Bull Creek–Leeming boundary	10.5	6.5	Benningfield Road	
Melville–Canning boundary	Bull Creek–Willetton–Leeming tripoint	11.6	7.2	Karel Avenue – Rossmoyne, Jandakot, Jandakot Airport	
Melville–Canning boundary	Willetton–Leeming boundary	13.2	8.2	Vahland Avenue – Riverton, Shelley	
Canning	Willetton–Canning Vale–Leeming tripoint	13.6	8.5	Roe Highway (State Route 3) – Forrestfield, Jandakot, Midland, Perth Airport	Signalised diamond interchange favouring Roe Highway
Canning	Canning Vale	14.0	8.7	Bannister Road	Eastern terminus. Continues as Ranford Road (State Route 13)
1.000 mi = 1.609 km; 1.000 km = 0.621 mi: Route transition
