= Cockburn Road =

Road in Perth, Western Australia

Cockburn Road Western Australia
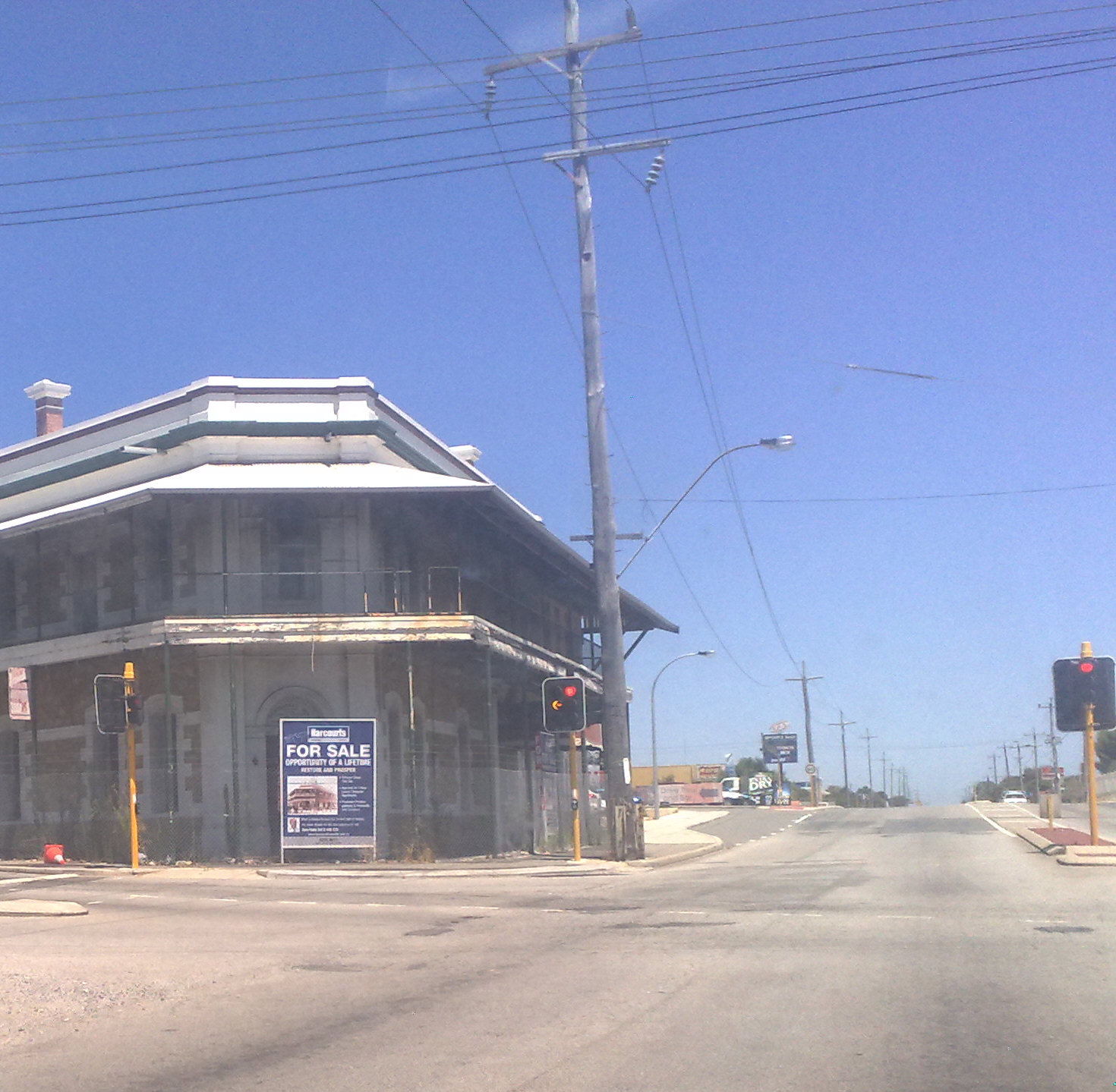
- Start of Cockburn Road at the Rockingham Road intersection in South Fremantle

General information
- Type: Road
- Length: 15 km (9.3 mi)
- Route number(s): State Route 12

Major junctions
- North end: Hampton Road (State Route 12), South Fremantle
- Spearwood Avenue (State Route 14); Russell Road
- South end: Rockingham Road (National Route 1), Naval Base

Location(s)
- Major suburbs: Hamilton Hill, Coogee, Henderson

Cockburn Road is a major road in the southern suburbs of Perth, which connects Fremantle and Kwinana. While it is for the most part a coastal road, much of its length travels through heavy industrial areas. However, a number of other facilities can be found on the road—the Woodman Point Recreation Reserve which includes camping and accommodation facilities, the Beeliar Regional Park and the Cockburn International Raceway.

Main Roads Western Australia controls the section between Rockingham Road and Russell Road, which is designated Highway H25.

Cockburn Road was rerouted around the Henderson Industrial Estate in 2001. In 2008, Cockburn Road was rerouted to bypass around the suburb of Coogee.

The only exits from this road, apart from Russell Road, are minor roads accessing the reserves, industrial estates or the residential suburb of Coogee. In the late 1990s, there was a plan to realign the road through Beeliar Regional Park. After objections from local residents the plan was scrapped.

== Major intersections ==
All intersections below are controlled by traffic signals unless otherwise indicated.

LGA	Location	km	mi	Destinations	Notes
Fremantle–Cockburn boundary	Beaconsfield–Hamilton Hill–South Fremantle tripoint	0	0.0	Rockingham Road - Hamilton Hill, Spearwood, Kwinana Beach	Continues north as Hampton Road (State Route 12) to Fremantle
Cockburn	North Coogee-Spearwood boundary	2.4	1.5	Spearwood Avenue (State Route 14) Spearwood, Bibra Lake, Armadale	
Cockburn	North Coogee-Coogee boundary	3.6	2.2	Orsino Boulevard	
Cockburn	Coogee	5.6	3.5	Mayor Road - Lake Coogee, Beeliar, Cockburn Central	Unsignalised T-intersection. Connects to Beeliar Drive
Cockburn	Henderson	8.1	5.0	Quill Way	Access to Australian Marine Complex
Cockburn	Henderson	9.0	5.6	Russell Road - Wattleup, Success, Atwell	Traffic continuing on Cockburn Road must turn here at unsignalised T-intersection
Kwinana	Naval Base	14.5	9.0	Hogg Road	Access to former Kwinana Alumina Refinery
Kwinana	Naval Base	15.4	9.6	Rockingham Road (National Route 1) - Fremantle, Spearwood, Rockingham, Mandurah	Southern terminus at signalised T-intersection
1.000 mi = 1.609 km; 1.000 km = 0.621 mi

== Gallery ==
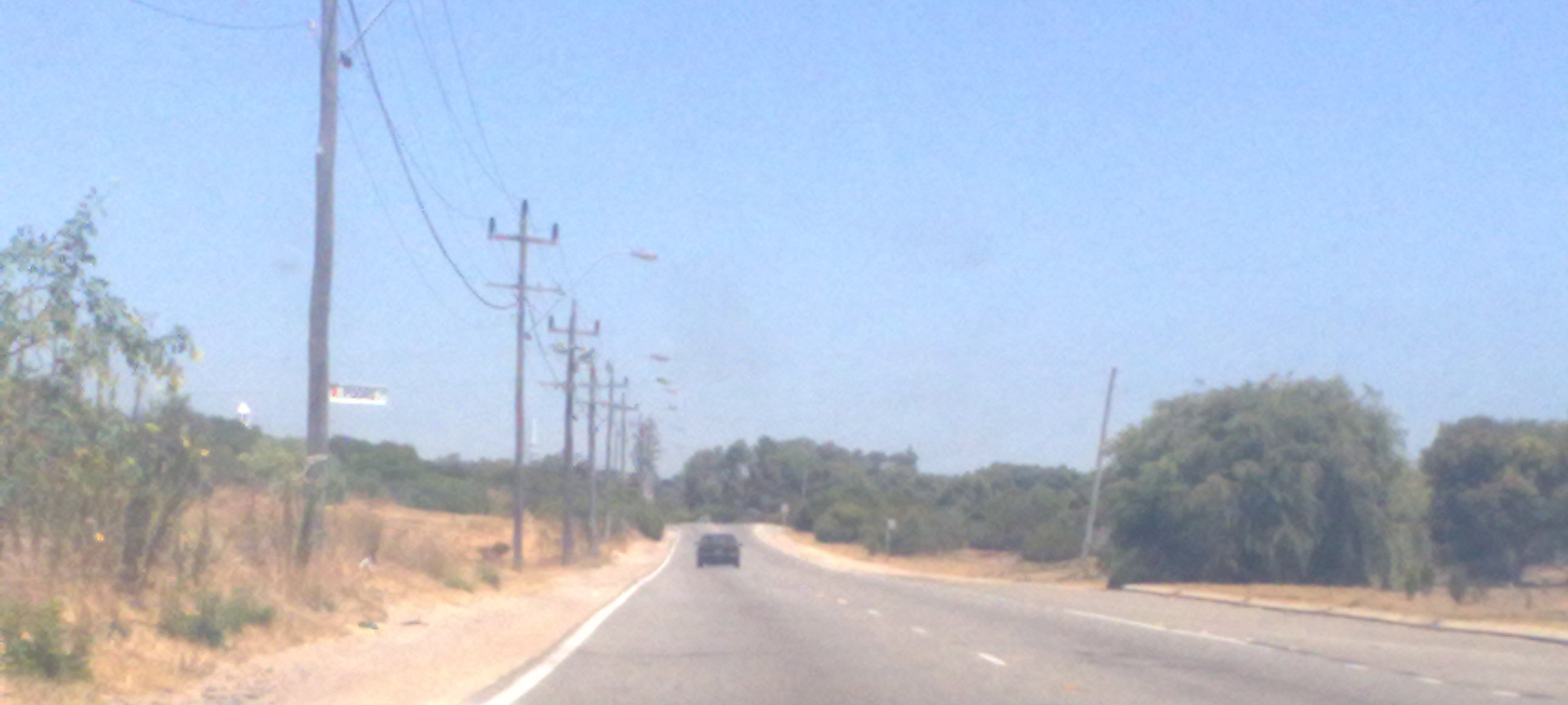
Cockburn Road heading south in Coogee

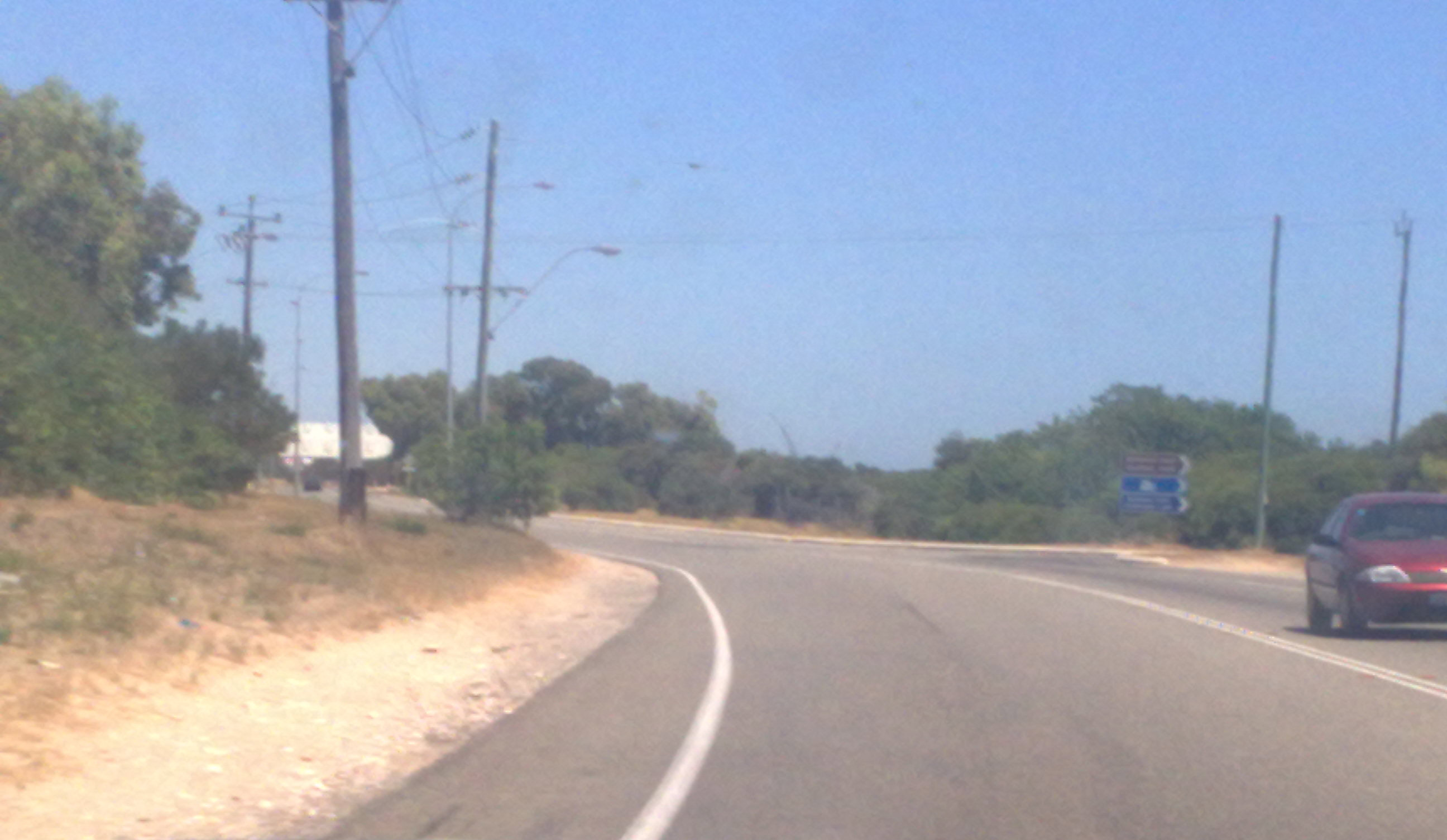
Cockburn Road heading south in Henderson
