= Newmarket Hotel =

Former pub in Hamilton Hill, Western Australia

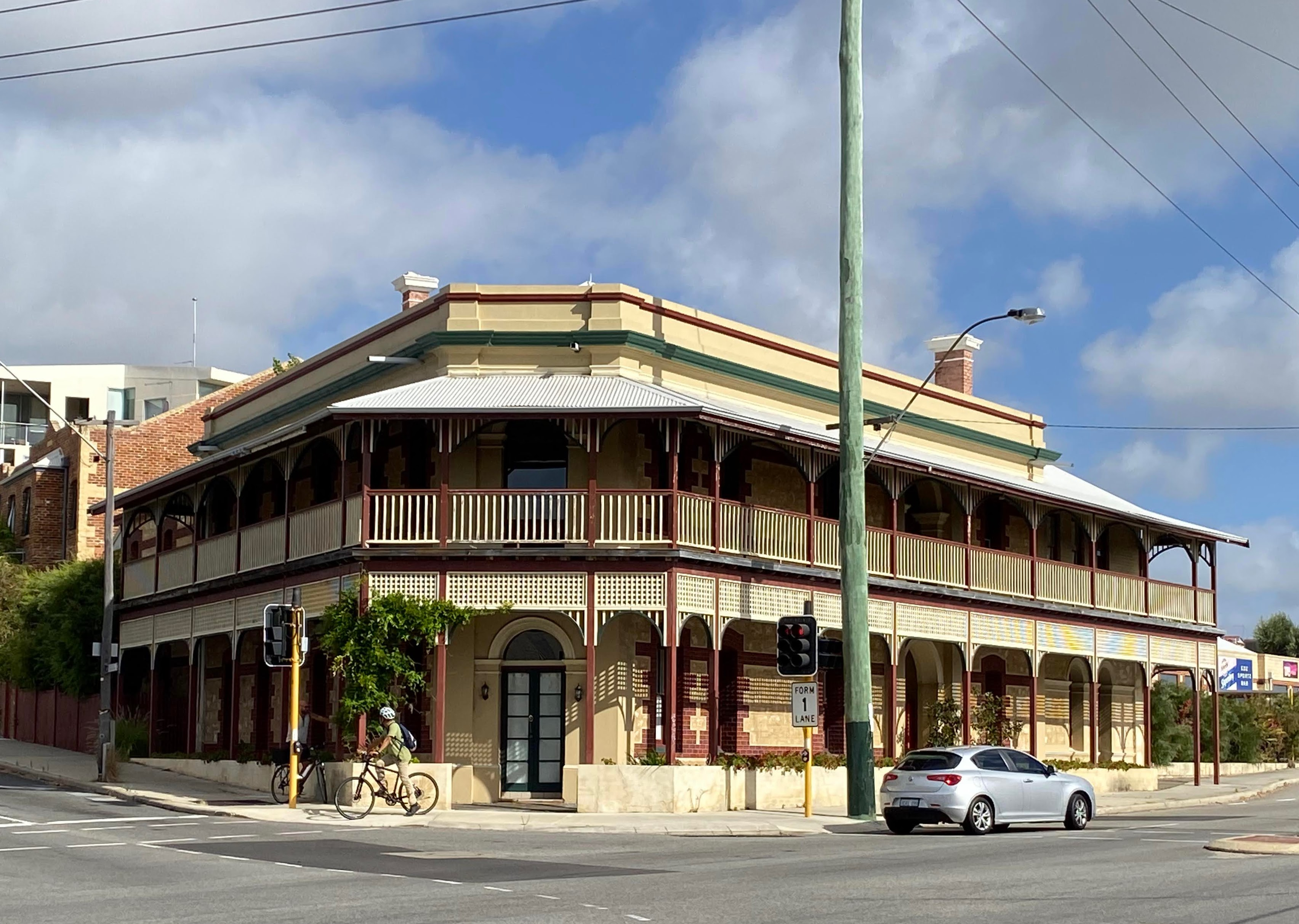
- Newmarket Hotel in 2012

- Location within Perth

General information
- Type: Australian pub
- Location: Hamilton Hill, Western Australia
- Coordinates: 32°04′32″S 115°45′41″E

Western Australia Heritage Register
- Designated: 7 September 2006
- Reference no.: 504

Newmarket Hotel is a heritage-listed former hotel in Hamilton Hill, Western Australia. Located at the corner of Rockingham and Cockburn roads, it was built in 1912, and operated as a hotel until the late 1990s.

The hotel has sometimes been referred to as being in South Fremantle, and at other time in Hamilton Hill. It was often chosen as a terminus for cycling events, was named as a tram line extension, and was a local focal point for the horse racing industry. The hotel was a filming location in the 1991 cult film Black Neon.

Change in lease and management were regular during its operational years. After being vacant for 18 years, it was renovated and reopened in 2017 as Hamilton House, a dance studio for the Swan River Ballet school.

== See also ==
- Coogee Hotel located a few kilometres south of the Newmarket Hotel
