= Samson, Western Australia =

Samson
- Suburb
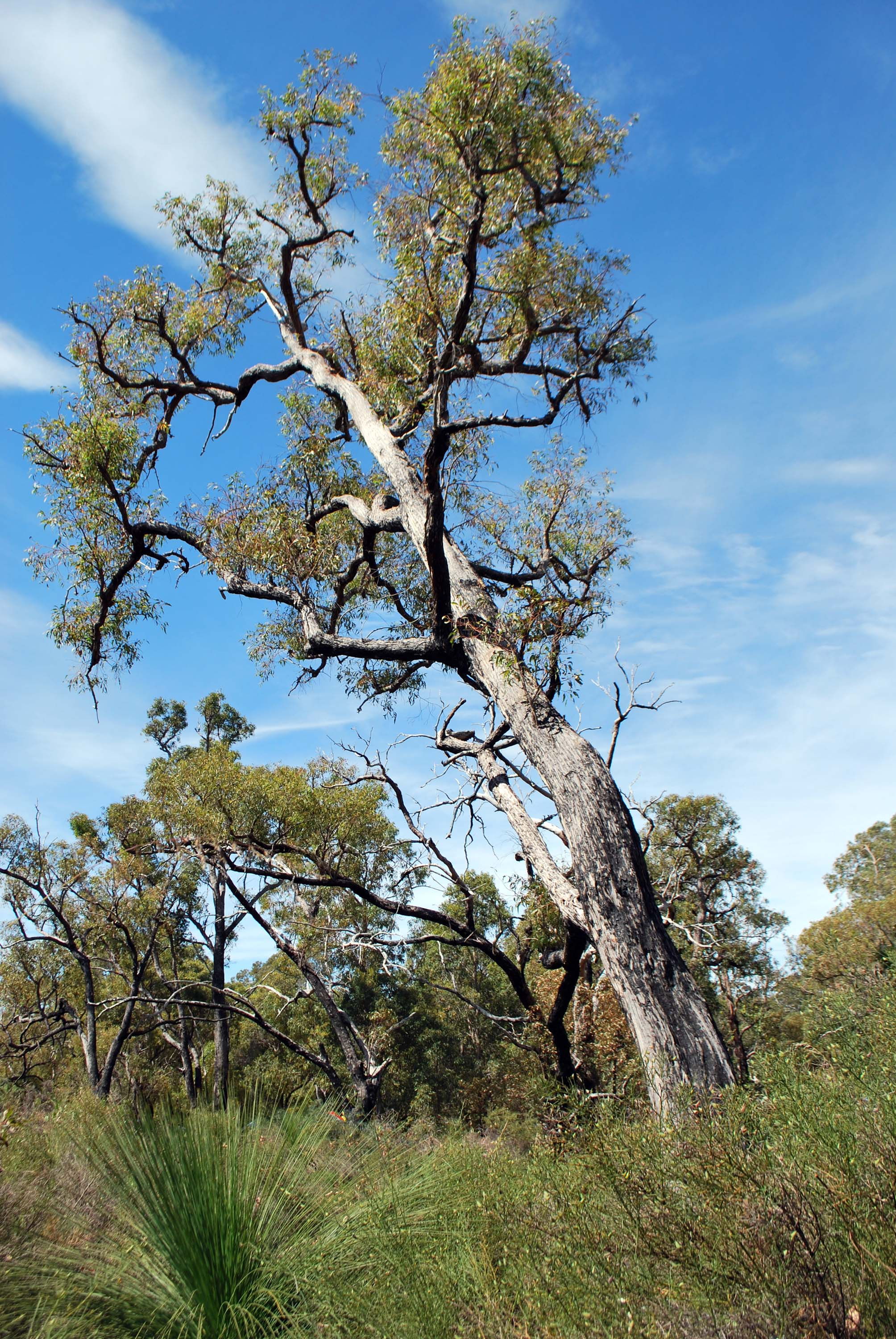
- Samson Park.
- Interactive map of Samson
- Coordinates: 32°04′12″S 115°47′52″E
- Country: Australia
- State: Western Australia
- City: Perth
- LGA: City of Fremantle

Government
  - State electorate: Bibra Lake
  - Federal division: Fremantle

Population
  - Total: 1,881 (SAL 2021)
- Postcode: 6163
Suburbs around Samson
O'Connor	O'Connor	Kardinya
Hilton	Samson	Kardinya
Hamilton Hill	Coolbellup	Coolbellup

Samson is a suburb of Perth, Western Australia in the City of Fremantle. Samson is bounded by South Street to the north, Stock Road to the west, Winterfold Road to the south, South Street to the north and east no further than Rushby and McMahon Ways.

The suburb comprises fewer than 40 streets and 800 homes.

The suburb of Samson was named after the Samson family who have been prominent in the Fremantle area for two centuries, including Sir Frederick Samson who served as mayor for over 20 years. The first notable Samson, Lionel Samson arrived in Fremantle in 1829 and started Lionel Samson and Sons that together with R.C. Sadleir Pty Limited became the Lionel Samson Sadleirs Group in 2012.

Samson is the easternmost neighbourhood of Fremantle and the most recent residential development. Prior to development, the site was owned by the army, being the site of the Melville Military Camp during World War II. In 1971, the City of Fremantle called tenders for the development of the area. The neighbourhood was developed by Messer's TM Burke Pty Ltd and its major park being named after former mayor, Sir Frederick Samson. Houses in Samson are predominantly of a brick and tile construction.

Samson Park is the largest bush reserve in the city of Fremantle. The park is located opposite the Samson Recreation Centre. Samson Park is the city of Fremantle's only Bush Forever park. Nature trails wind through the park displaying jarrah, marri and tuart trees, and a variety of native plants. The park also provides habitat to over 50 bird species, reptiles and bats. Samson Park is a popular picnic and meeting place, with picnic spaces and also a children's playground. Samson park contains the following facilities: picnic areas, BBQ facilities, basketball court, dog walking areas.

== Transport ==
=== Bus ===
- 511 Fremantle Station to Murdoch Station – serves Winterfold Road and Mccombe Avenue
- 998 Fremantle Station to Fremantle Station (limited stops) – CircleRoute Clockwise, serves South Street
- 999 Fremantle Station to Fremantle Station (limited stops) – CircleRoute Anti-Clockwise, serves South Street
