= White Gum Valley, Western Australia =

White Gum Valley
- Suburb
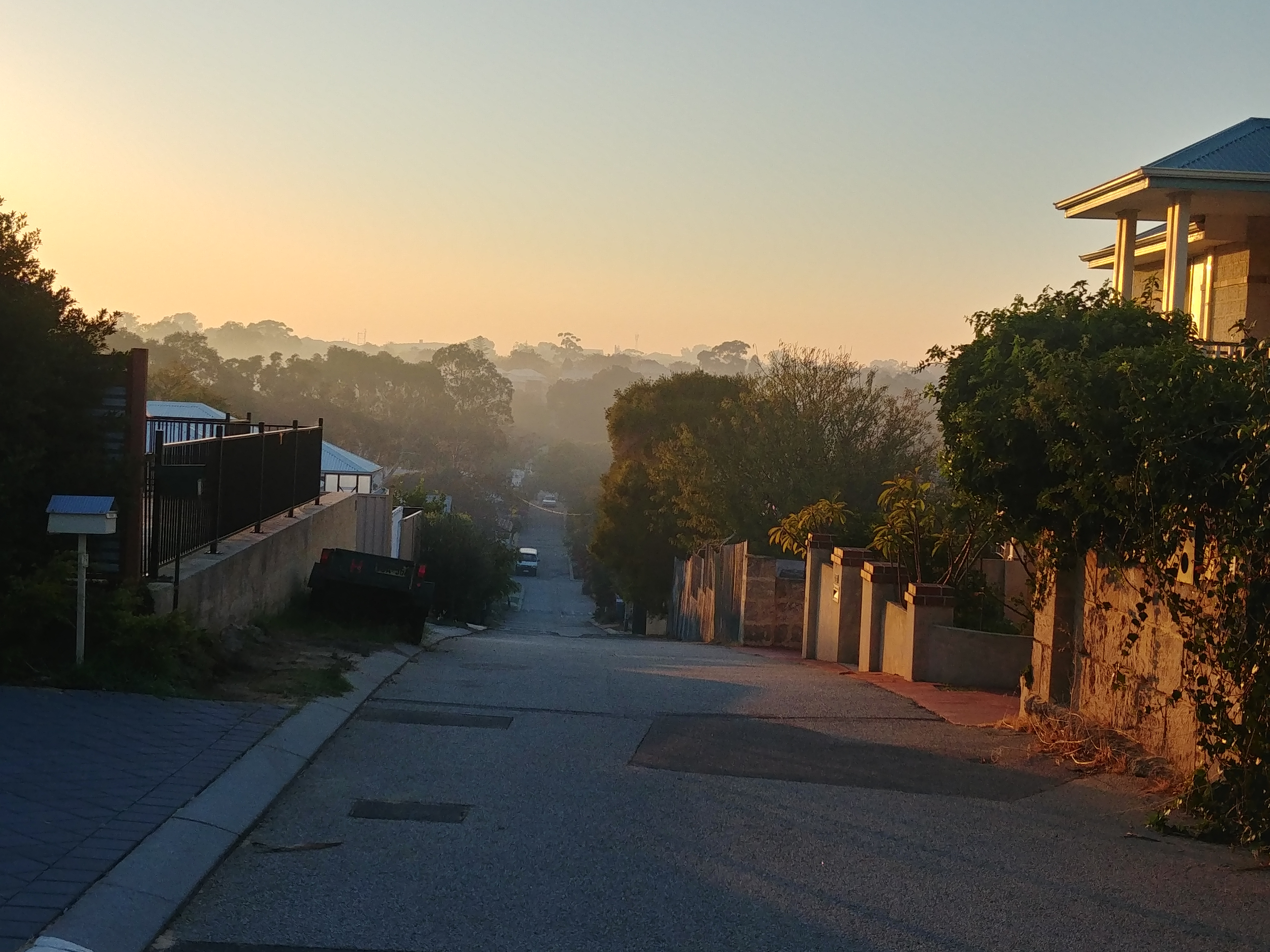
- Pitts Lane, White Gum Valley
- Interactive map of White Gum Valley
- Coordinates: 32°03′37″S 115°46′14″E
- Country: Australia
- State: Western Australia
- City: Perth
- LGA: City of Fremantle

Government
  - State electorate: Fremantle
  - Federal division: Fremantle

Population
  - Total: 3,358 (SAL 2021)
- Postcode: 6162
Suburbs around White Gum Valley
Fremantle	Fremantle	O'Connor
Fremantle	White Gum Valley	O'Connor
Beaconsfield	Beaconsfield	Hilton

White Gum Valley is a suburb of Perth, Western Australia located within the City of Fremantle. It is situated behind the main ridge that lies east of Fremantle.

== Name ==
There are no records of the origins of the name, but it is thought to be named for the tuart tree Eucalyptus gomphocephala, which is less frequently known as white gum and has box-like bleached white to light grey coloured bark and is native to the area.

== Geography ==
White Gum Valley is bordered by South Street to the south, Carrington Street to the east, Stevens Street to the north and Edmund Street to the west.

=== Street names ===
Several of the streets in the White Gum Valley are named for pioneering families in the area, such as Samson Street named after Frederick Samson. Most of the streets running north-to-south are named after towns and localities in the Murchison and Mid West regions of Western Australia: Yilgarn Street, Wiluna Street, Nannine Avenue, Yalgoo Avenue, Wongan Avenue, and Minilya Avenue.

=== Parks and reserves ===
Two parks and reserves are located in the suburb of White Gum Valley: Davies Reserve in the west of the suburb, and Valley Park in the centre of the suburb. The Royal Fremantle Golf Club and Fremantle Golf Course are located to the north of the suburb, in Fremantle.

== Schools ==
White Gum Valley Primary School is located in the west of the suburb. Kim Beazley School, formerly used by special education students, was shut in 2008. The former school was demolished in 2011 to make way for residential development.

== Transport ==
=== Bus ===
- 114 Lake Coogee to Elizabeth Quay Bus Station – serves Carrington Street
- 502 Fremantle Station to Bull Creek Station – serves Edmund Street, Watkins Street and Carrington Street

Bus routes serving South Street:

- 160 Fremantle Station to WACA Ground
- 998 Fremantle Station to Fremantle Station (limited stops) – CircleRoute Clockwise
- 999 Fremantle Station to Fremantle Station (limited stops) – CircleRoute Anti-Clockwise
