= North Coogee =

- Suburb
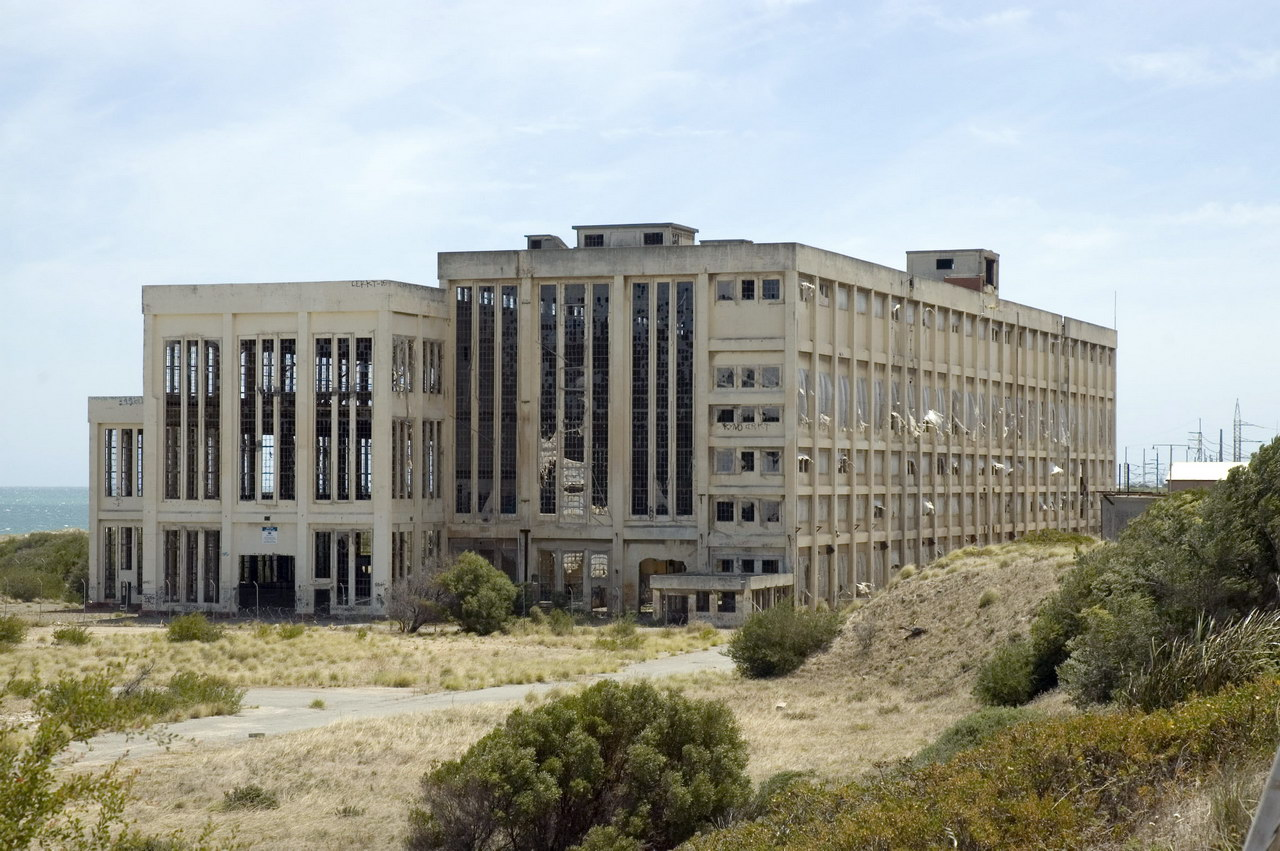
- South Fremantle Power Station
- Interactive map of North Coogee
- Coordinates: 32°05′35″S 115°45′34″E
- Country: Australia
- State: Western Australia
- City: Perth
- LGA: City of Cockburn
- Location: 23 km (14 mi) from Perth
- Established: 2005

Government
  - State electorate: Fremantle
  - Federal division: Fremantle

Area
  - Total: 2.8 km^{2} (1.1 sq mi)

Population
  - Total: 3,741 (SAL 2021)
- Postcode: 6163
Suburbs around North Coogee
Cockburn Sound	South Fremantle	Hamilton Hill
Cockburn Sound	North Coogee	Spearwood
Cockburn Sound	Coogee	Spearwood

North Coogee is a coastal, western suburb of Perth, Western Australia, located within the City of Cockburn. The suburb is immediately to the north of Coogee, which takes its name from the lake, Lake Coogee, in the area, which translates to "Body of water" in the native Aboriginal Nyoongar language. Originally this lake was named Lake Munster after Prince William, the Earl of Munster, and later King William IV. The Aboriginal name Kou-gee was recorded in 1841 by Thomas Watson and has been variously spelt Koojee, Coojee and Coogee.

North Coogee was created on 19 December 2005 and incorporated portions of the surrounding suburbs of Hamilton Hill, Spearwood and Coogee.

== Location ==
North Coogee is located 4 kilometres (2.5 mi) south of Fremantle, and is bounded by the municipal boundary of the City of Fremantle to the north, Cockburn Road and Beeliar Regional Park to the east, Powell Road to the south and Cockburn Sound to the west.

North Coogee overlooks Cockburn Sound with views of Garden Island, Carnac Island and Rottnest Island.

== History ==
The first development in the area may have been when Richard Goldsmith Meares who established a lime burning kiln in 1831, south of the Clarence townsite. Meares had arrived at the Swan River Colony with Thomas Peel in the previous year. Meares abandoned the site after a few months moving to Mount Helena, later becoming the Government Resident at York.

As the area was adjacent to the relatively safe harbour of Owen's Anchorage in Cockburn Sound, the area began to be used as an alternative destination point for ship arrivals.

The original land grant was to George Robb and stretched between Hamilton Hill and North Lake. In 1899 it was further subdivided and by 1900 the area saw the establishment of a number of commercial lime kilns, to provide for the construction boom and population growth which had been brought about by gold discoveries.

The area continued to take on an industrialised character that continued until the early 1990s. Features of the area included the Fremantle Smelting Works, just south of Island Street, which processed lead and base bullion from Kalgoorlie. Next to the smelter was the slaughter house of Copley & Co, processing sheep and cattle on the same location where John Wellard had slaughtered sheep for the Convict establishment in the early 1850s.

Further south at Robb Jetty, slaughter houses operated by Forrest, Emanuel & Co, and Connor, Doherty and Durack existed, these slaughter houses essentially supplied all the meat to the metropolitan area and the expanding goldfields. The livestock arriving from the north-west of the state including the Kimberley Region and were unloaded from the ships onto the jetty. As there was no cold storage at the slaughter houses extensive pasturing for the animals as well as small market gardens were established in the region around the abattoir.

In 1898 a railway was built from Fremantle to Robb Jetty. The slaughter houses expanded with a bone mill, blood manure and skin-drying sheds added.

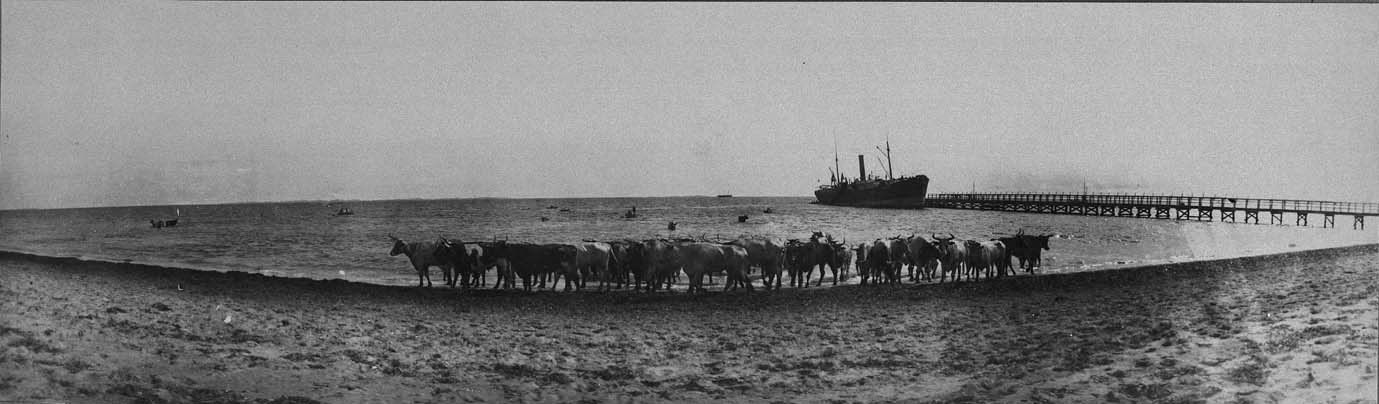
Cattle being unloaded from a ship at Robb Jetty in the 1920s. Livestock were shipped from the Kimberley.

Next to the slaughter houses an explosives magazine was built in the sandhills. In addition a piggery, slaughter house and bacon factory were built by J.C Hutton & Co, south of Robb Jetty at James Rocks.

In 1903 the railway was extended to Woodman Point and the explosives magazine was moved there, further away from Fremantle.

The area steadily became the centre of much of Perth's heavy industry and comprised the coal-fired power station, railway marshalling yards, abattoir as well as numerous skin drying sheds. From the 1980s however, pressures brought on by demands for residential housing began a process of removal of the various facilities.

=== Robb Jetty Yard ===
Robb Jetty Yard marshalling yard with signal box tower built in the 1960s during the standard gauge railway line project from Kalgoorlie to Leighton.

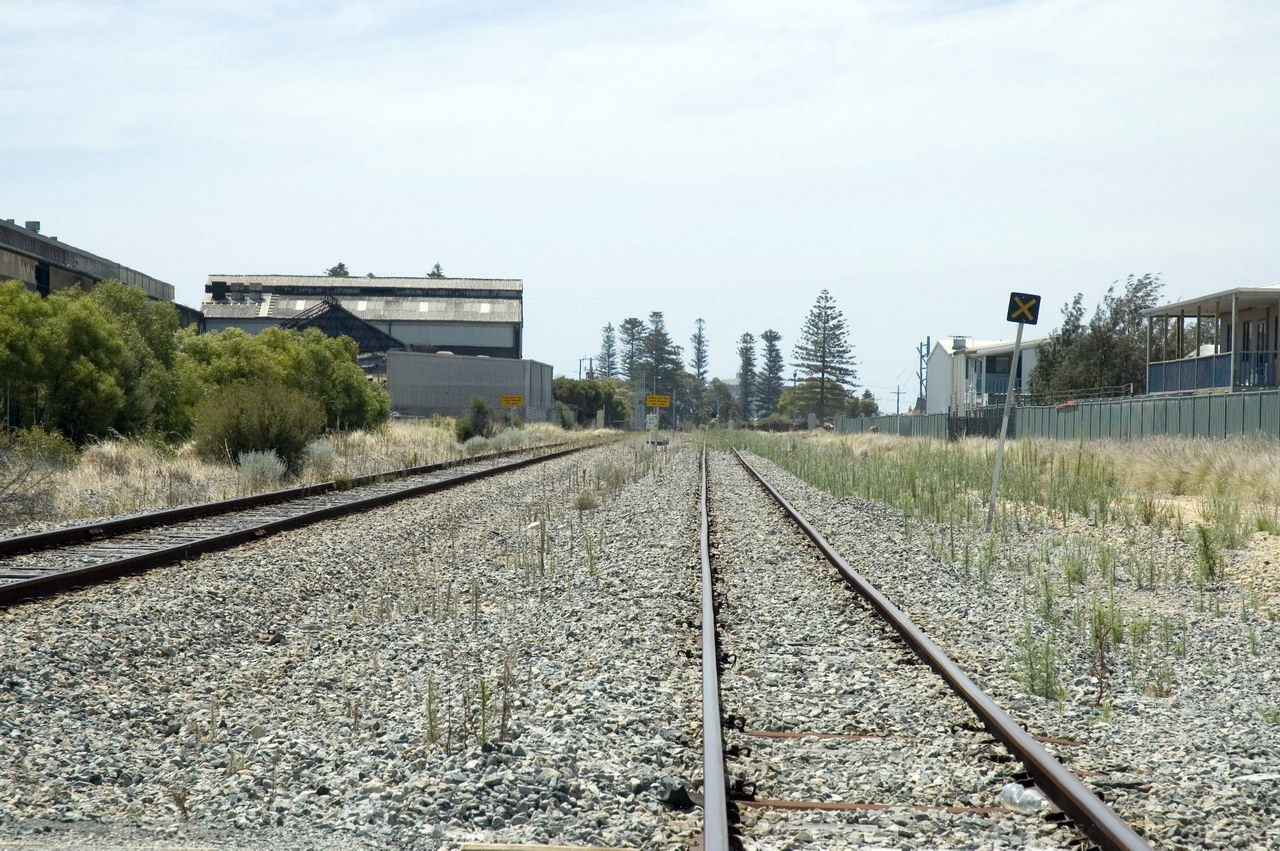
Area of the old marshalling yards.

The yard was decommissioned in the Westrail era in the 1990s.

=== Robb Jetty Abattoir ===
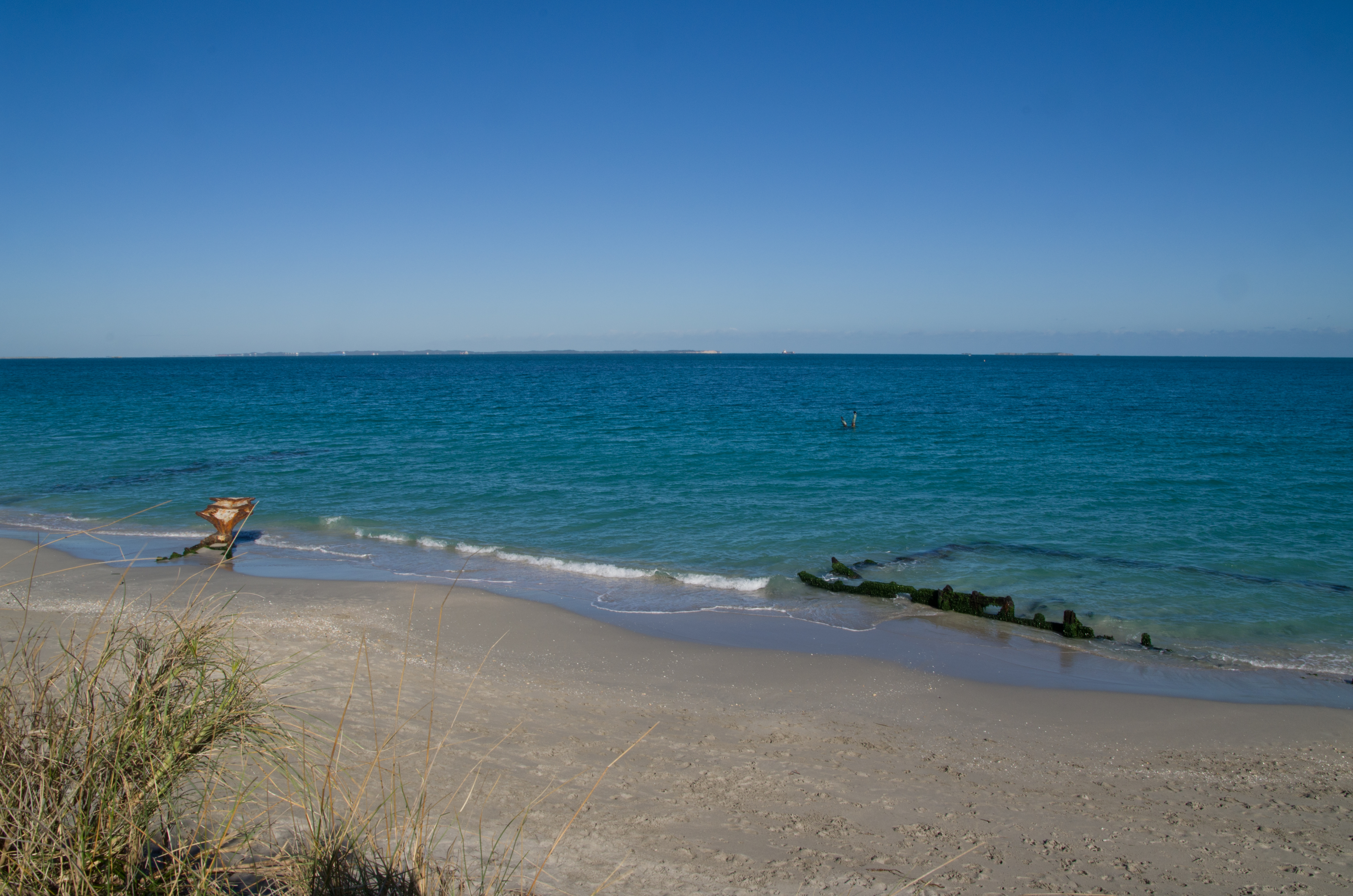
C. Y. O'Connor beach – along the shore line left to right; Robb Jetty pylons dark area below the water, bow of SS Wyola, an old timber barge, in the water the C. Y. O'Connor statue.

The abattoir was closed in 1994 with the jetty itself dismantled in the 1960s. All that remains of the former jetty are the pylons which extend between 200 and 300 metres (660 and 980 ft) out to sea. The chimney is the only remaining part of the large complex of buildings which included offices, holding yards, freezer and chiller facilities. The chimney is listed in the State Register of Heritage Places.

=== South Fremantle Power Station ===
Construction of the Power Station commenced in January 1946. The South Fremantle site was chosen for its relatively close metropolitan population, its proximity to nearby railway facilities for the delivery of coal and the ease with which seawater could be utilised for the cooling system. The four boilers 1, 2, 3 & 4 of 'A' Station were fired up in January 1951; the first 25 MW turbo-alternator came on line in May 1951 prior to the official opening of the Power Station on 27 June 1951 by the Hon. David Brand, Minister for Electricity. In September 1951, the second 25 MW turbo alternator came on line. The No. 3 turbo alternator came on line in January 1954, and the No. 4 turbo alternator in December 1954. The power station was then complete with a total capacity of 100 MW.

Much of the plant was designed and manufactured in Great Britain, with skilled contractors sent out from Britain to assemble the plant on site. The State Energy Commission encouraged the recruitment of staff by providing housing in the Hilton Park area, and the new suburb soon had many community amenities. A bus service from the power station to Hilton and Fremantle was provided for shift workers. Over 250 workers were employed at the power station during the 1950s.

In 1954, a major fire at South Fremantle in the coal conveyor from the crusher house caused structural damage and resulted in a switch to oil fuel for the boilers. In the mid-1970s the plant was converted back to coal, which fuelled the station until its closure in 1985. By the 1980s production of electricity at South Fremantle had become uneconomical. The interconnected grid then was supplying electricity from power stations with more up-to-date machinery and closer to the coal source at Collie, Bunbury, Kwinana and Muja.

In September 1985, the South Fremantle Power Station closed after 34 years service and its four chimney stacks were demolished.

== 1992–present ==
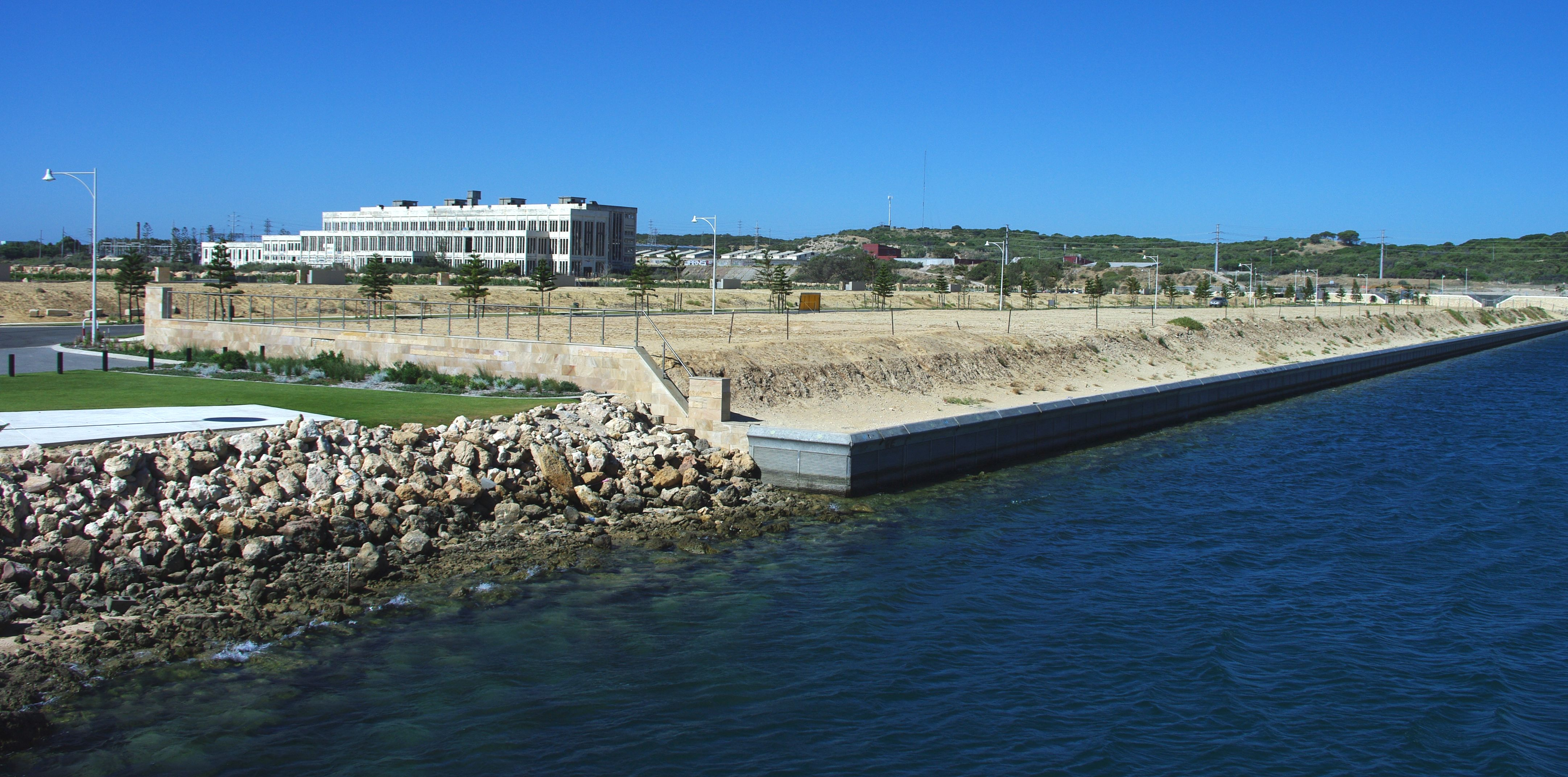
Looking from Port Coogee development north towards South Fremantle Powerstation and O'Connor Beach.

South Beach

In 2002 the State Government and Stockland sought to redevelop the former ANI/Bradken Foundry and surrounding land (including the former rail marshalling yards) for residential purposes. This was opposed by a local resident action group, Save South Beach, which actively campaigned against the redevelopment on issues of site contamination, diminished coastal setback, rail noise and coastal erosion impacts. Despite the ongoing protests the redevelopment commenced with the first resident lots reaching the market in 2005.

Port Coogee/Point Catherine

In 1992 the State Government agreed in-principle to develop a residential marina in the Coogee locality. In 1996 the State Government entered into an agreement with Port Catherine Developments Pty Ltd (PCD) to facilitate the proposed marina. The project was opposed by a resident action group, Coogee Coastal Action Coalition, concerned about the loss of beaches, potential coastal erosion, impact on local seagrass and existing site contamination issues Since the signing of the agreement PCD has been taken over by Australand Property Group and work has commenced on the construction of the marina, with the first lots reaching the market in 2007.

Cockburn Coast

In 2008 the State Government launched their vision for the development of the former industrial area between South Beach and the Port Coogee marina, with 95 hectares (230 acres) of coastal land being proposed to be redeveloped for residential purposes, housing approximately 10,000 people.

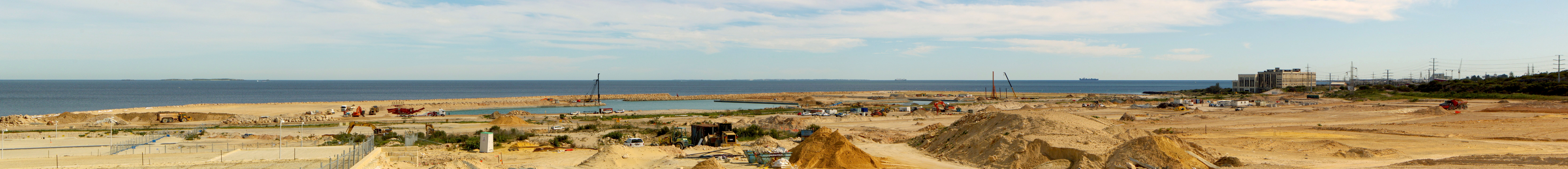
Port Coogee under construction

== Transport ==
=== Bus ===
- 512 Fremantle Station to Murdoch Station – serves Cockburn Road, Pantheon Avenue and Orsino Boulevard
- 548 Fremantle Station to Rockingham Station – serves Cockburn Road, Pantheon Avenue and Orsino Boulevard
