= South Fremantle =

- Suburb
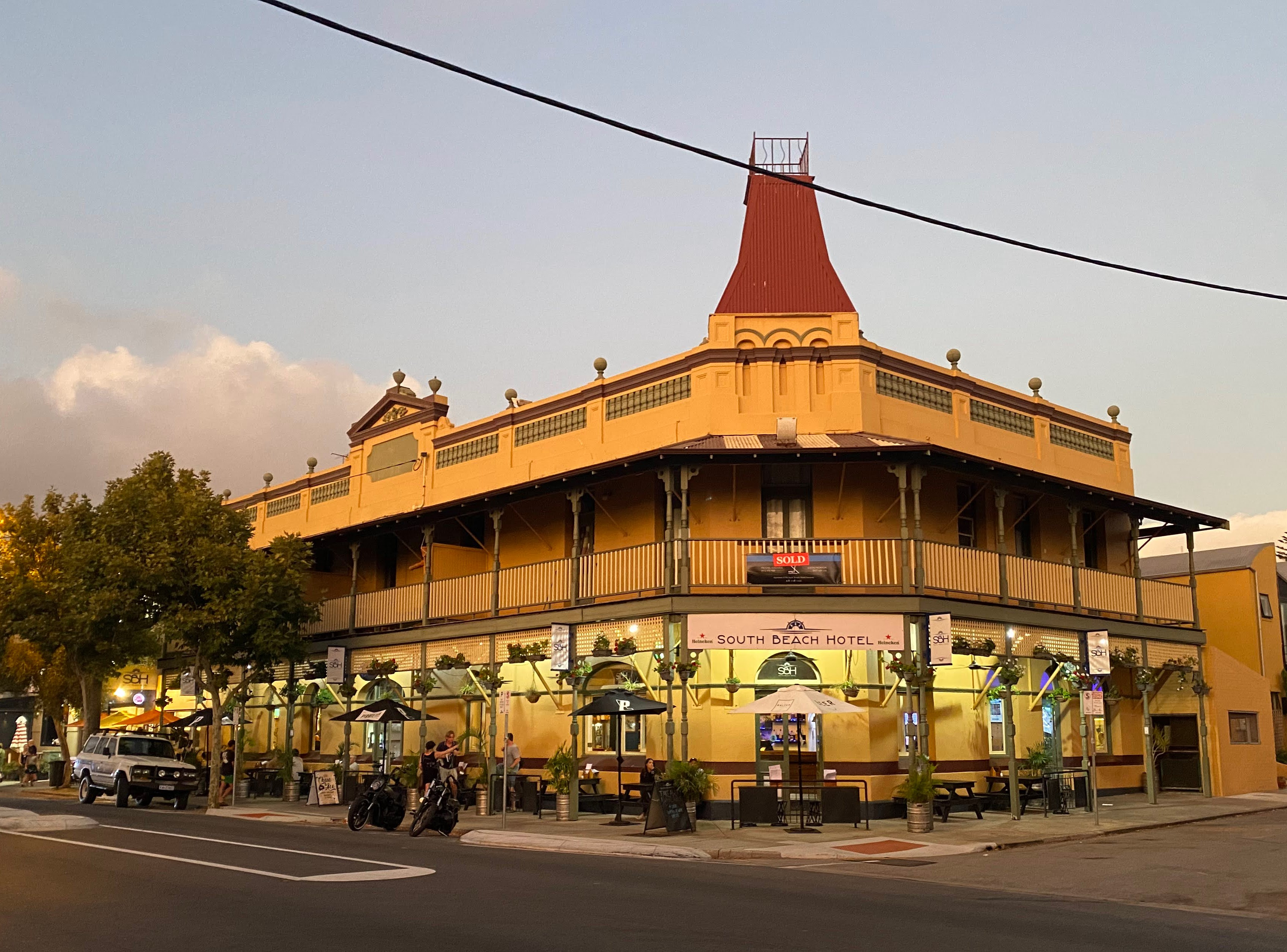
- The South Beach Hotel
- Interactive map of South Fremantle
- Coordinates: 32°04′18″S 115°45′16″E
- Country: Australia
- State: Western Australia
- City: Perth
- LGA: City of Fremantle

Government
  - State electorate: Fremantle
  - Federal division: Fremantle

Population
  - Total: 3,398 (SAL 2021)
- Postcode: 6162
Suburbs around South Fremantle
Indian Ocean	Fremantle	Fremantle
Indian Ocean	South Fremantle	Beaconsfield
Indian Ocean	North Coogee	Hamilton Hill

South Fremantle is a suburb of Perth, Western Australia, located within the City of Fremantle.

== History ==
The first development in the area may have been when Richard Goldsmith Meares established a lime-burning kiln in 1831. Meares had arrived at the Swan River Colony with Thomas Peel in the previous year.

As the area was adjacent to the relatively safe harbour of Owen's Anchorage in Cockburn Sound, the area began to be used as an alternative destination point for ship arrivals.

In 1898, a railway was built from Fremantle to Robb Jetty. At that time, an abattoir was built for slaughter of livestock arriving from the north-west of the state including the Kimberley Region. Livestock were unloaded from the ships onto a jetty. Extensive pasturing for the animals as well as small market gardens were established in the region around the abattoir.

The Coogee Hotel was built in 1901, and in 1903 the railway was extended to Woodman Point. Commercial lime kilns were established during this period to provide for the construction boom and population growth which had been brought about by gold discoveries. The Newmarket Hotel on the border of Hamilton Hill and South Fremantle, was often identified as being in either of the suburbs.

The area steadily became the centre of much of Perth's heavy industry and comprised the coal-fired power station, railway marshalling yards, abattoir as well as numerous skin drying sheds. From the 1980s however, pressures brought on by demands for residential housing triggered a process of removal of the various facilities.

== South Beach ==
South Beach is an area of beach and adjacent land in South Fremantle. The beach and the disused railway station are parts of the South Fremantle community history.

== Industrial heritage ==
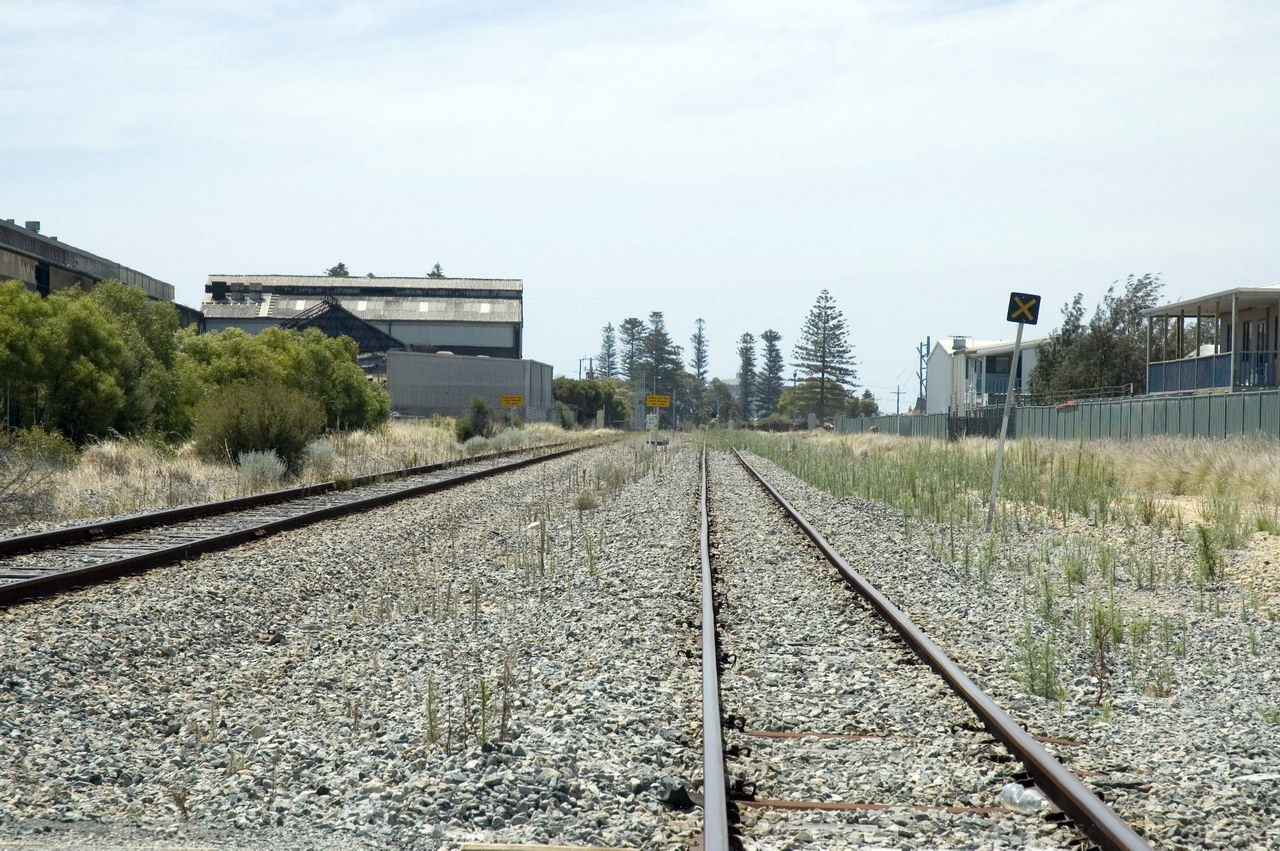
Area of the old marshalling yards

=== Robb Jetty Yard ===
Robb Jetty Yard, a large marshalling yard with signal box tower was built by Western Australian Government Railways in the 1960s during the standard gauge railway line project from Kalgoorlie to Leighton.

The yard was decommissioned in the Westrail era in the 1990s.

=== Robb Jetty Abattoir ===
See Robbs Jetty Abattoir

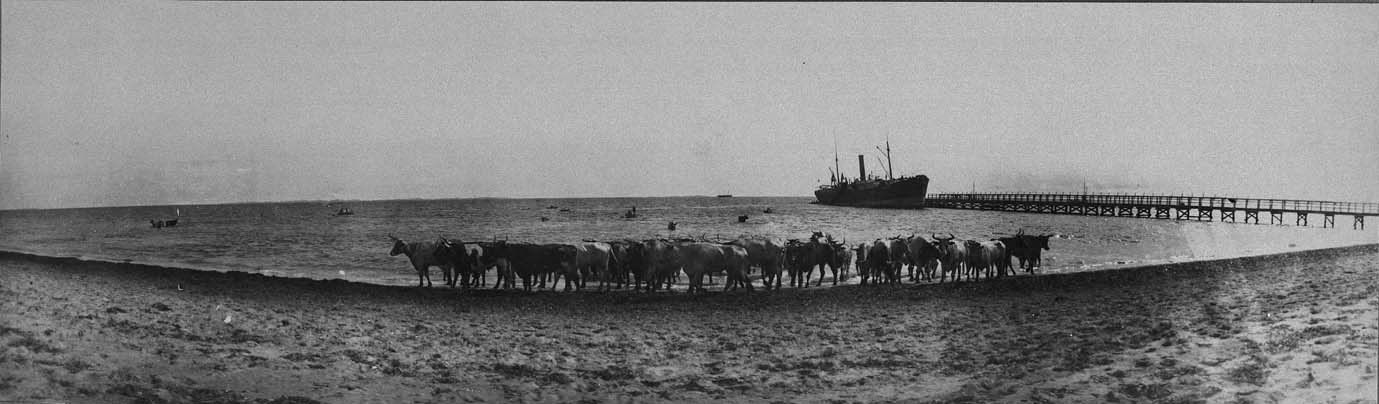
Cattle being unloaded from a ship at Robb Jetty in the 1920s. Livestock were shipped from the Kimberley.

== Public transport ==
South Fremantle is serviced by bus routes 511, 530, 531, 532, 533, 548, 549, 998 and 999.

=== Bus ===
- 512 Fremantle Station to Murdoch Station – serves South Street, Hampton Road and Cockburn Road
- 532 Fremantle Station to Cockburn Central Station – serves South Terrace, Douro Road and Hampton Road
- 548 Fremantle Station to Rockingham Station – serves South Street, Hampton Road and Cockburn Road
- 998 Fremantle Station to Fremantle Station (limited stops) – CircleRoute Clockwise, serves South Street
- 999 Fremantle Station to Fremantle Station (limited stops) – CircleRoute Anti-Clockwise, serves South Street

Bus routes serving South Street and Hampton Road:

- 511 and 513 Fremantle Station to Murdoch Station
- 520, 530 and 531 Fremantle Station to Cockburn Central Station
- 549 Fremantle Station to Rockingham Station
