= Beaconsfield, Western Australia =

Beaconsfield
- Suburb
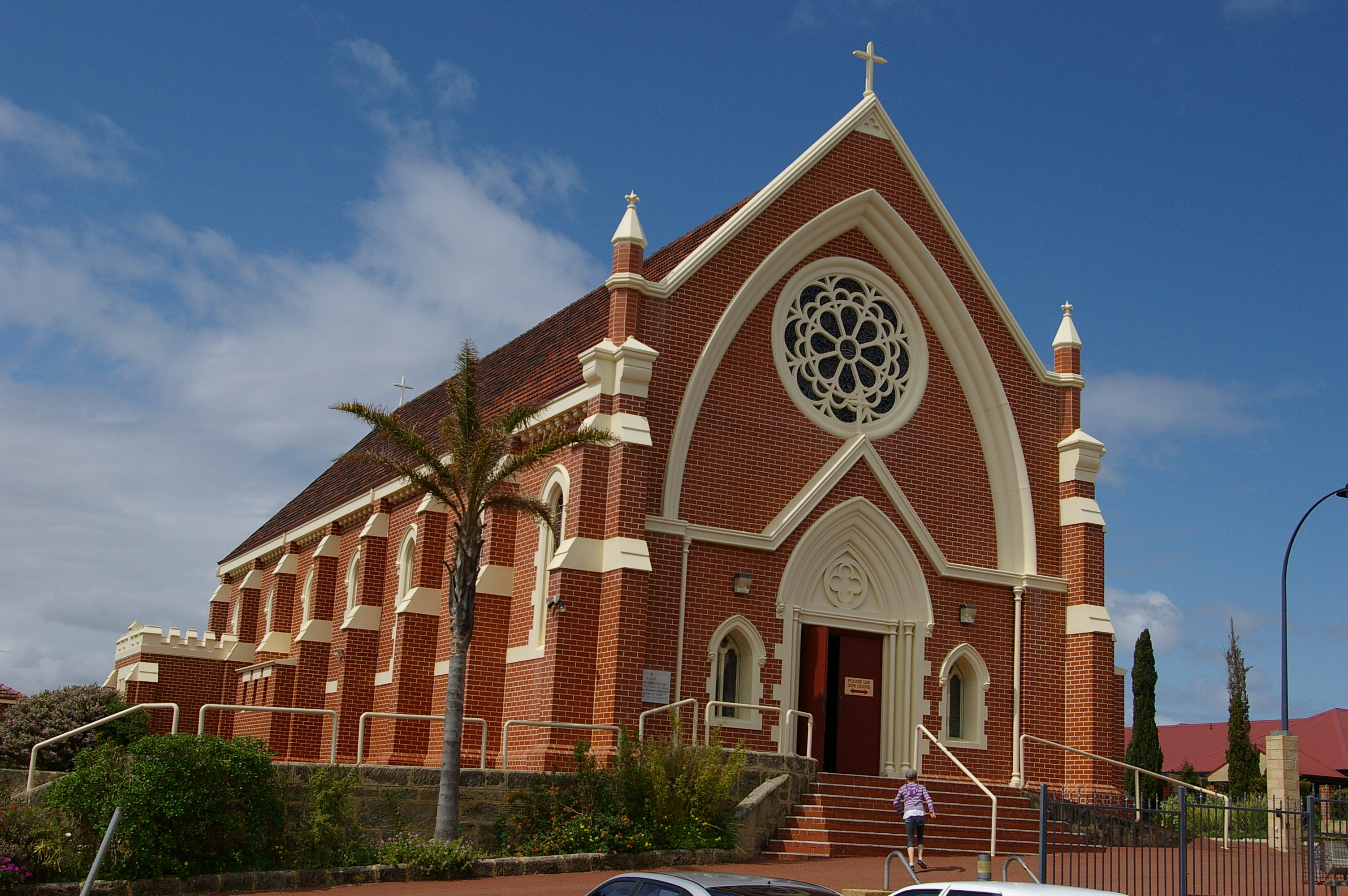
- Christ the King Church, Beaconsfield
- Interactive map of Beaconsfield
- Coordinates: 32°04′10″S 115°46′07″E
- Country: Australia
- State: Western Australia
- City: Perth
- LGA: City of Fremantle

Government
  - State electorate: Fremantle
  - Federal division: Fremantle

Population
  - Total: 5,315 (SAL 2021)
- Postcode: 6162
Suburbs around Beaconsfield
Fremantle	White Gum Valley	Hilton
South Fremantle	Beaconsfield	Hilton
South Fremantle	Hamilton Hill	Hamilton Hill

Beaconsfield is a suburb of Perth, Western Australia, located within the City of Fremantle. It was named after a property of the same name in the area in the 1880s; the name was officially adopted from the post office on 1 August 1894. The name's origin is unknown, but it probably comes from the town in England or the Earl of Beaconsfield, Benjamin Disraeli, a former Conservative Prime Minister of the United Kingdom.

Beaconsfield is predominantly a low to medium density residential suburb with extensive community facilities including Fremantle College, several primary schools, and an array of open space recreation reserves and local shops.

== Facilities and amenities ==
=== Parks and playgrounds ===
- Beacy Park
- Davis Park
- Dick Lawrence Oval
- Hilton Park Soccer Fields
- Ken Allen Field
- James Moore Pioneer Park
- Bruce Lee Reserve

=== Transport ===
==== Bus ====
- 114 Lake Coogee to Elizabeth Quay Bus Station – serves Carrington Street
- 160 Fremantle Station to WACA Ground – serves South Street
- 511 and 513 Fremantle Station to Murdoch Station – serve Hampton Road, Lefroy Road and York Street
- 532 Fremantle Station to Cockburn Central Station – serves Hampton Road and Clontarf Road
- 998 Fremantle Station to Fremantle Station (limited stops) – CircleRoute Clockwise, serves South Street
- 999 Fremantle Station to Fremantle Station (limited stops) – CircleRoute Anti-Clockwise, serves South Street

Bus routes serving Hampton Road:

- 512 Fremantle Station to Murdoch Station
- 520, 530 and 531 Fremantle Station to Cockburn Central Station
- 548 and 549 Fremantle Station to Rockingham Station

=== Schools and education ===
There are a number of schools in the suburb including several primary and one high school.

- Beaconsfield Primary School
- Winterfold Primary School
- Christ the King School
- Fremantle College
- Fremantle Peel District Education

=== Sporting clubs ===
- Hilton Park Junior Cricket Club
- Hilton Park Bowling & Recreation Club
- Fremantle City Dockers Junior Football Club Inc.
- Fremantle Roosters Rugby League Football Club Inc
- Excalibur Fencing Club

=== Shops and shopping centre ===
- Lefroy Road Shopping Centre

== Notable citizens ==
- Thomas Herman Andersen, WA Commissioner of Police from 1951 to 1958
- Peter Tagliaferri, a former mayor of the City of Fremantle between 2001 and 2009

== Gallery ==
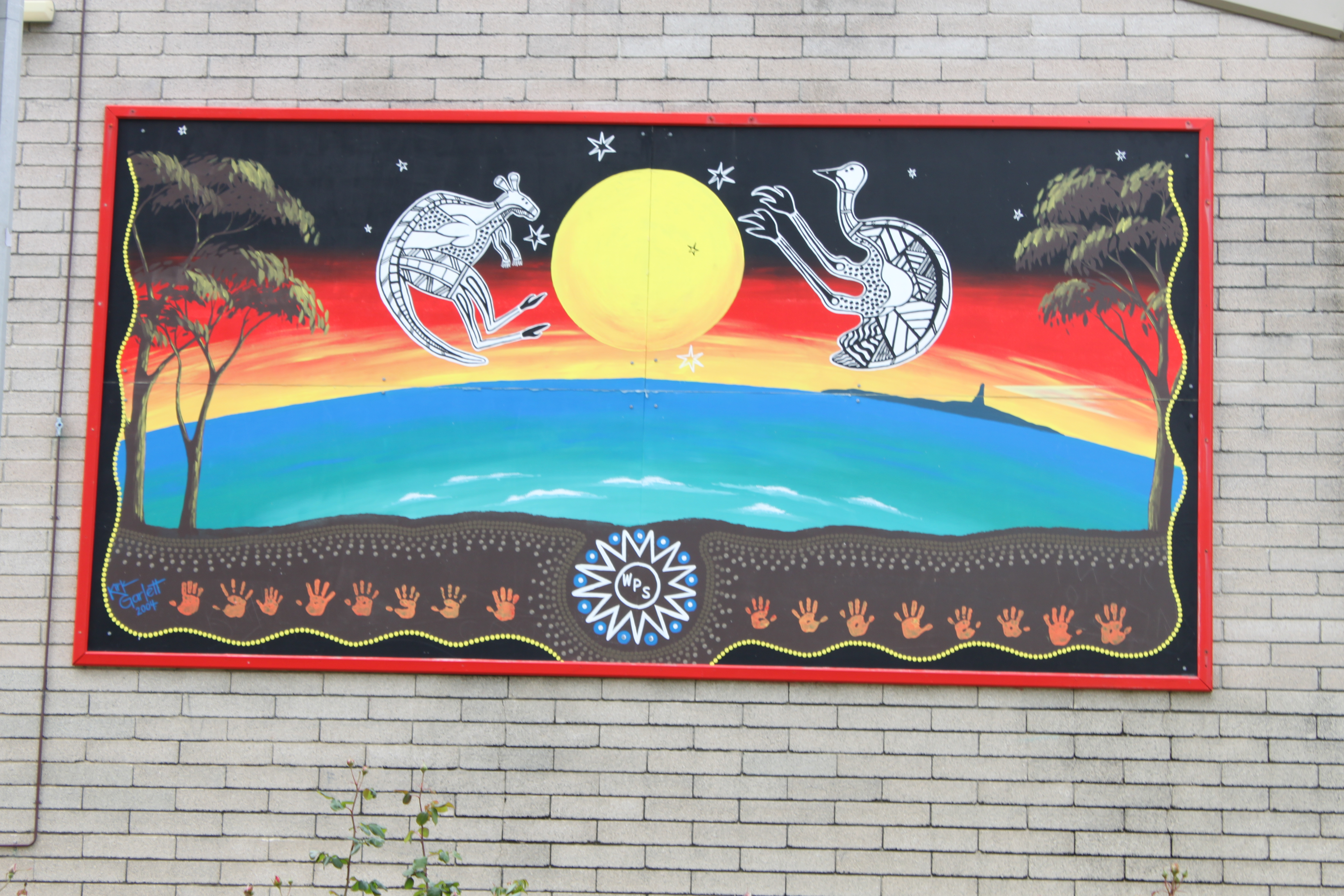
Aboriginal mural at Winterfold Primary School

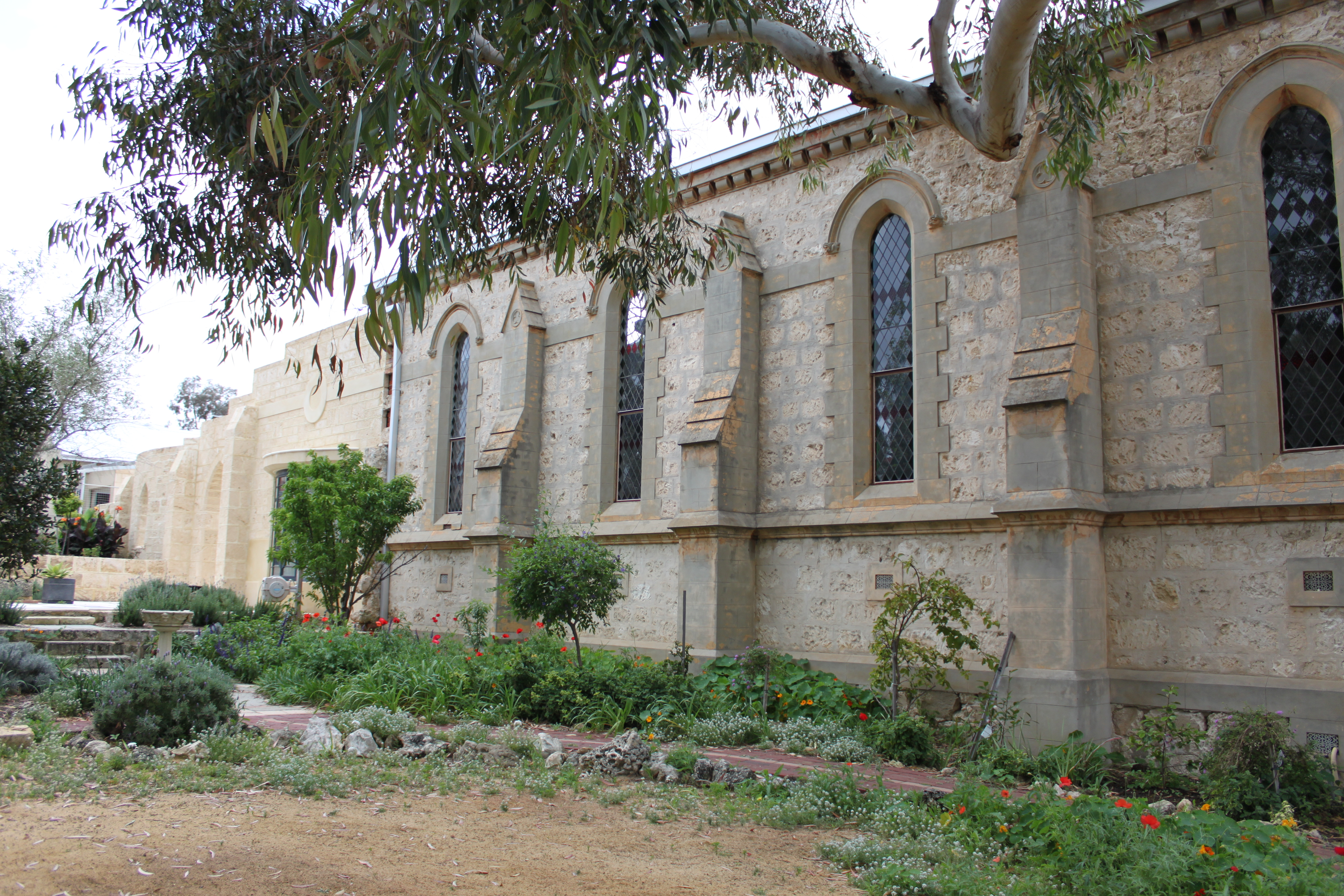
View alongside of St Paul's Anglican Church

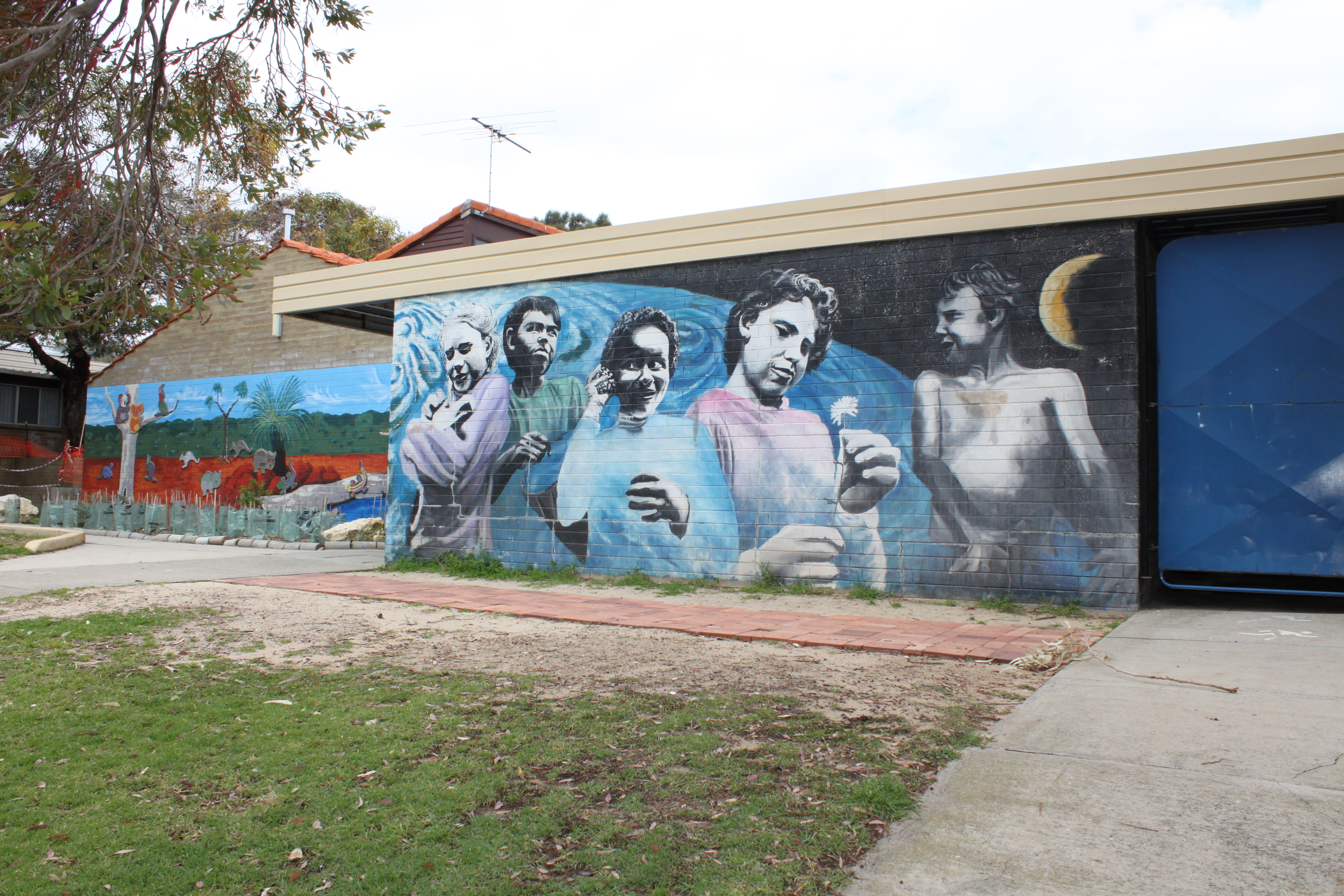
Murals at Beaconsfield Primary School

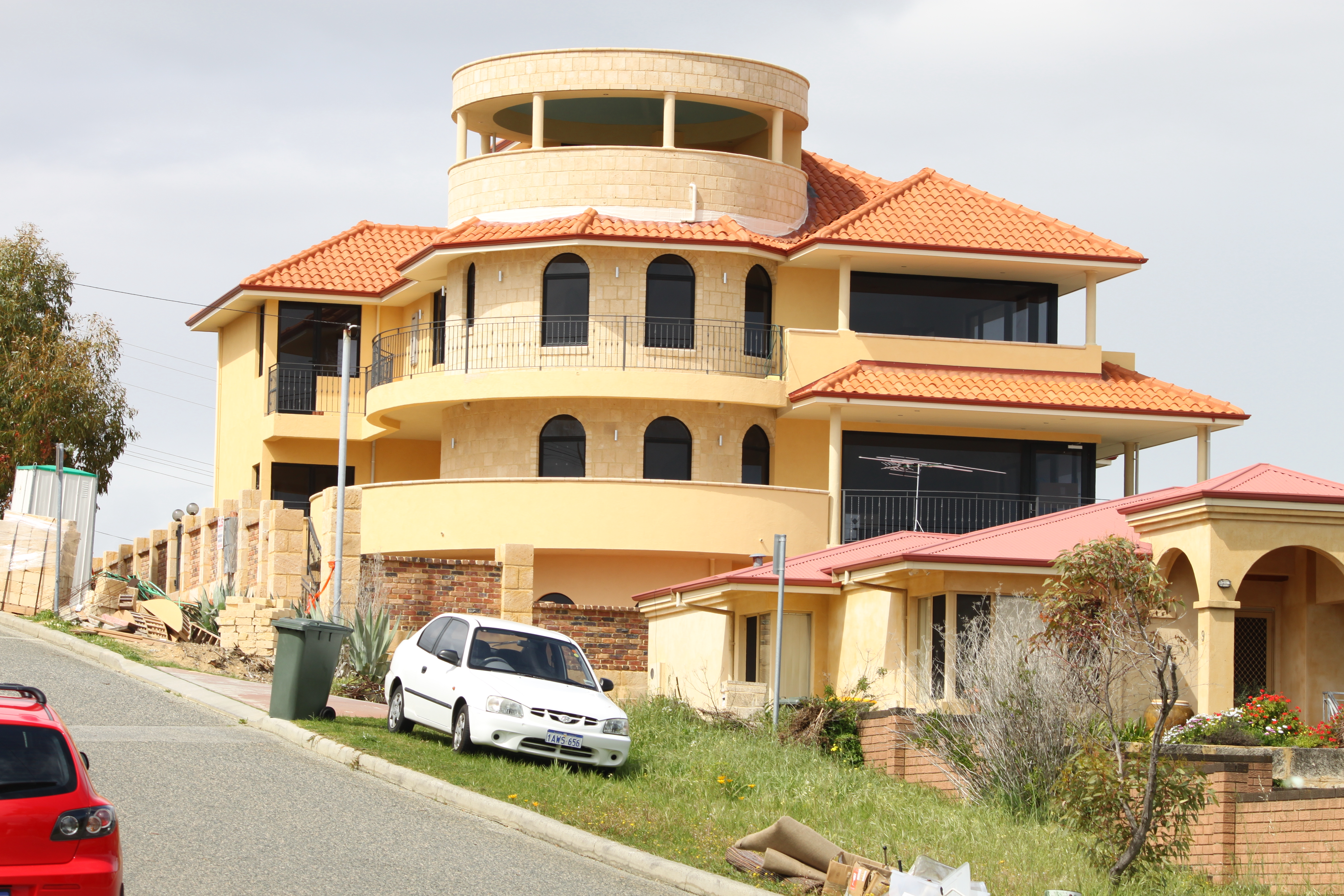
House under construction on Moran Street

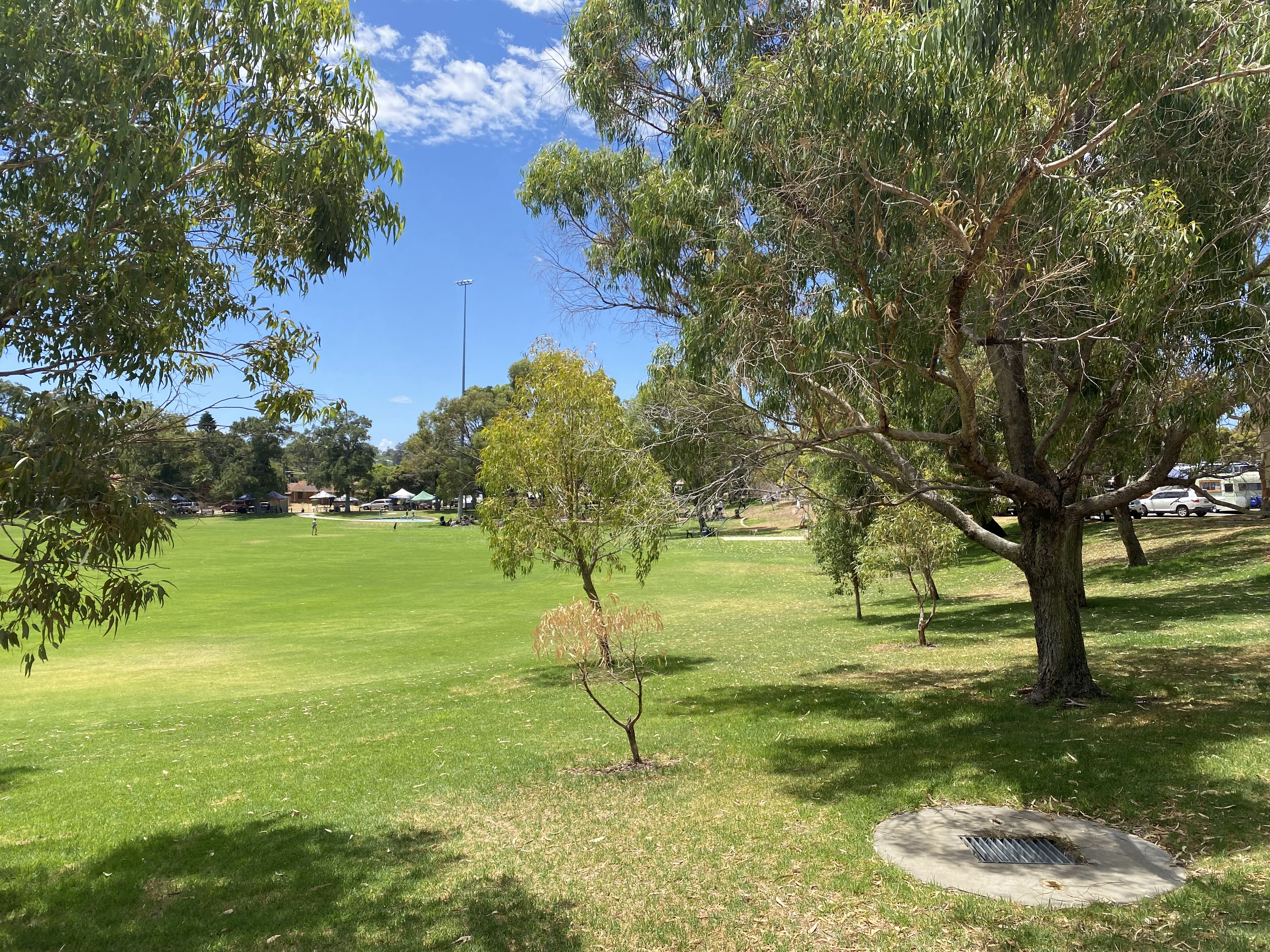
Bruce Lee Reserve
