= Spearwood, Western Australia =

Spearwood
- Suburb
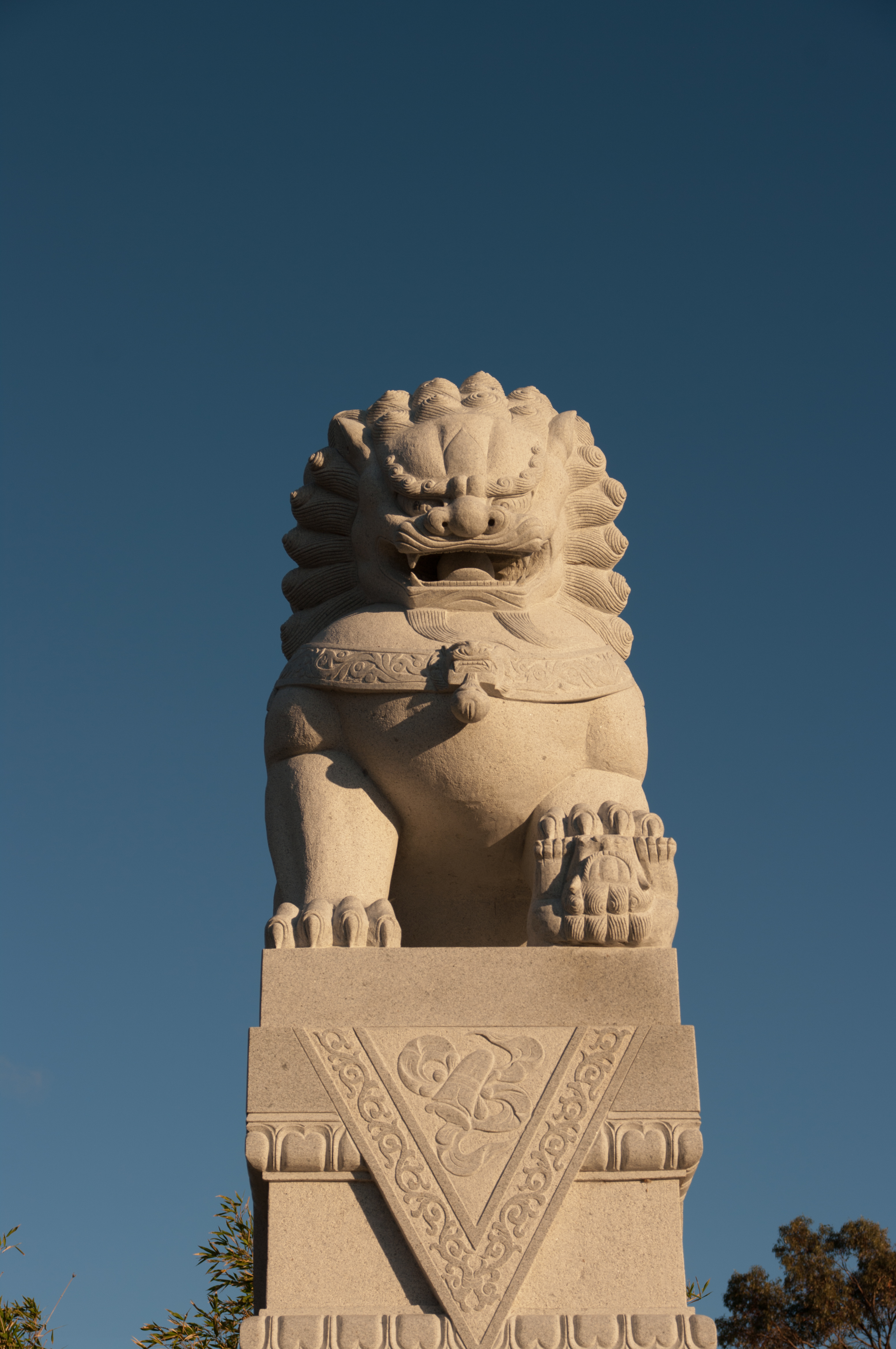
- Statue for Sister city Yueyang, China on Spearwood Road
- Interactive map of Spearwood
- Coordinates: 32°06′15″S 115°47′02″E
- Country: Australia
- State: Western Australia
- City: Perth
- LGA: City of Cockburn
- Location: 18 km (11 mi) S of Perth City

Government
  - State electorate: Cockburn, Fremantle, Bibra Lake
  - Federal division: Fremantle

Area
  - Total: 6.1 km^{2} (2.4 sq mi)

Population
  - Total: 10,944 (SAL 2021)
- Postcode: 6163
Suburbs around Spearwood
North Coogee	Hamilton Hill	Coolbellup
Coogee	Spearwood	Bibra Lake
Coogee	Lake Coogee	Yangebup

Spearwood is a southern suburb of Perth, Western Australia, located within the City of Cockburn. This suburb derives its name from the Spearwood bush which is a common shrub in the area.

== History ==
Settlement appears to have begun in Spearwood in the 1850s when Alfred Hooker took up Cockburn Sound Location 97, although several adjoining blocks were taken up during the same period by Charles Manning. When Cockburn Sound Location 264 was offered for subdivision by real estate entrepreneur James Morrison in 1883 he used the name The Spearwood Estate, the first time the name was used. The Spearwood area soon became one of Perth's major market gardening areas.

== Geography ==
It is bounded by Phoenix Road to the north, Stock Road to the east, Barrington Street and Troode Street to the south and Hamilton Road to the west.

Phoenix Road was named by John Healy after Phoenix Park Dublin, where the British Chief Secretary for Ireland was assassinated by Fenians in 1882, although an alternative suggestion is that it was named by Steve Dobra, the first settler on Phoenix Road, who worked in Phoenix, Arizona before coming to Western Australia in 1912. Barrington Street is named after Barrington C. Wood, the first Mayor of Fremantle (1883–1885). Troode Street is named after Edward Thomas Troode, the original owner of the Woodlands Estate from 1860. The suburb is approximately 85% shrubland.

== Facilities ==
=== Commercial ===
The main shopping area is Phoenix Shopping Centre, a thriving commercial centre located along Rockingham Road, with a smaller centre, Stargate Spearwood located further south, also on Rockingham Road.

=== Cultural ===
The City of Cockburn's main administrative offices and library are located on Coleville Crescent immediately to the south of the Phoenix Shopping Centre. The Spearwood Library and Cockburn Seniors Centre are both located next to the council buildings.

=== Educational ===
There are four primary schools located within the suburb: Spearwood Primary School, Newton Primary School, Phoenix Primary school and Spearwood Alternative School.

=== Aged Care Facilities ===
There are 2 main aged care facilities in Spearwood. The first being Aegis Amberley Aged Care, belonging to the Aegis Aged Care Group and the second one is Villa Dalmacia Aged Care.

=== Recreational ===
Dalmatinac Park is home to the Spearwood Dalmatinac Amateur Soccer Club and the Dalmatinac Netball Club.

Watsons Oval is home to the Southern Spirit Soccer Club.

Beale Park is home to Cockburn City Soccer Club which plays in the Premier league of the State's Football (Soccer) Association and also the Cockburn City Teeball and Baseball Club.

Manning Park is a picturesque park located around Manning Lake. There are a number of walking trails around the park. It is home to the Spearwood Walking Racers Association, where walkers can be seen around the park on weekends holding time trials.

Spearwood is also home to many Croatian sporting clubs and community centres. There is a significant Croatian cultural history in the Spearwood area.

== Transport ==
Bus

- 512 Fremantle railway station to Murdoch railway station serves - Spearwood Ave, Rockingham Rd & Phoenix Rd.
- 530 Fremantle railway station to Cockburn Central railway station serves - Rockingham Rd
- 531 Fremantle railway station to Cockburn Central railway station serves - Doolette St, Spearwood Ave, Coleville Cres & Rockingham Rd
- 532 Fremantle railway station to Cockburn Central railway station serves - Rockingham Rd
