= Hilton, Western Australia =

Hilton
- Suburb
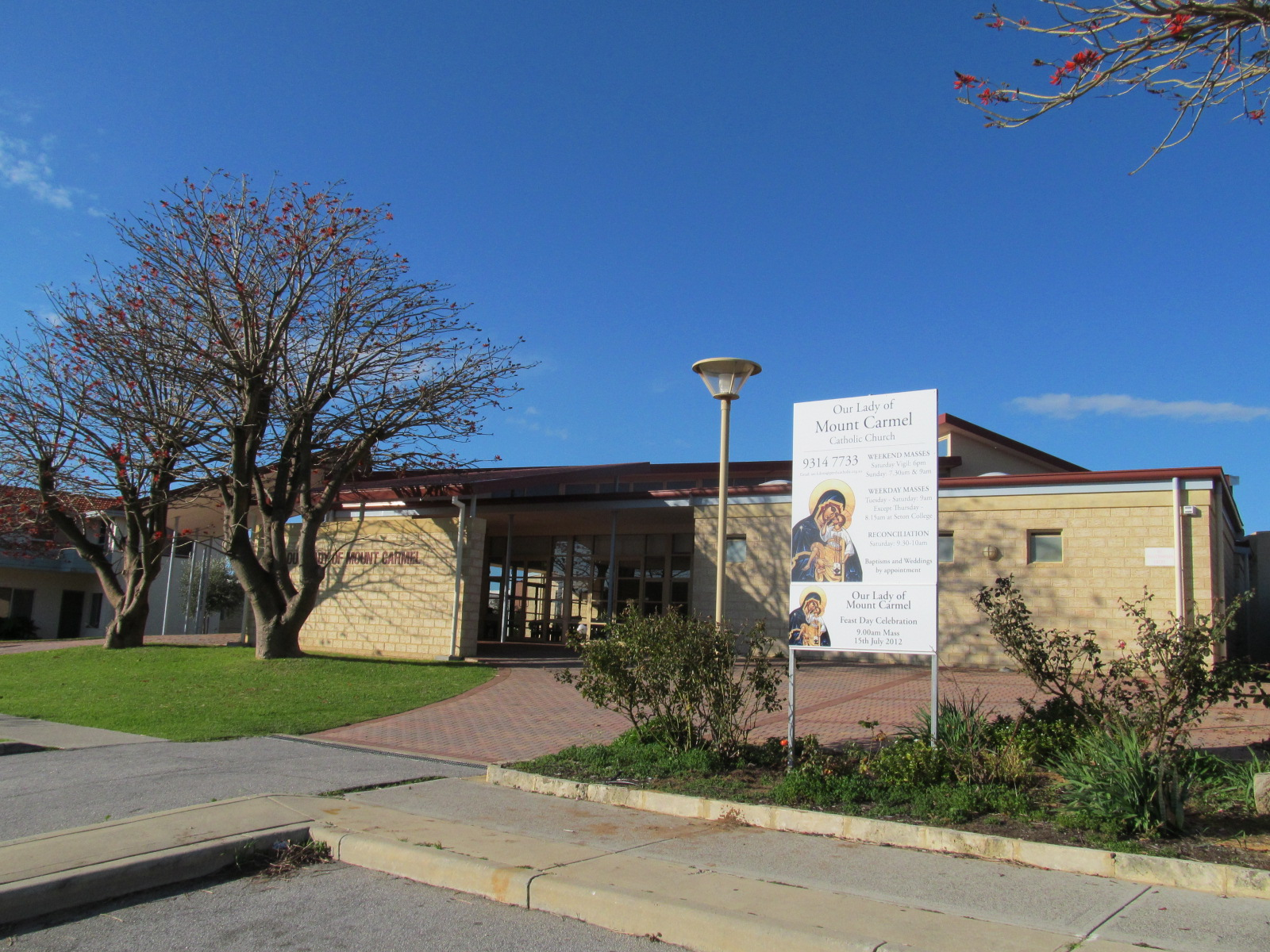
- Our Lady of Mount Carmel Church in Hilton
- Interactive map of Hilton
- Coordinates: 32°04′05″S 115°47′09″E
- Country: Australia
- State: Western Australia
- City: Perth
- LGA: City of Fremantle

Government
  - State electorate: Fremantle
  - Federal division: Fremantle

Population
  - Total: 4,323 (SAL 2021)
- Postcode: 6163
Suburbs around Hilton
| White Gum Valley | O'Connor | O'Connor |
| Beaconsfield | Hilton | Samson |
| Hamilton Hill | Hamilton Hill | Coolbellup |

Hilton is a suburb of Perth, Western Australia, located within the City of Fremantle.

The suburb has an eclectic mixture of weatherboard, fibro and brick dwellings. The suburb is undergoing extensive urban renewal and recently more three and four-bedroom, two-bathroom homes have been built.

Its post-World War II design was under a state government initiative known as "garden suburbs" which meant wide verges and single homes on large blocks.

The northern precinct of Hilton contains a number of laneways and the village centre (on the north side of South Street) comprising a greengrocer, giftware emporium, newsagent, printers, chemist, butcher, a hair salon, squash courts, builders, veterinarian surgery and a café.

South Street, Paget Street and Carrington Street contain most of the remaining retail activity in Hilton, including a public bar, pizzeria and a post office. In June of 2021 the existing IGA was demolished to make way for a new enlarged retail space with initial tenants named as Coles, a café and a liquor merchant.

Hilton is approximately five minutes drive from the central business district of Fremantle and from the Indian Ocean.

== Transport ==
=== Bus ===
- 114 Lake Coogee to Elizabeth Quay Bus Station – serves Carrington Street
- 160 Fremantle Station to WACA Ground – serves South Street, Paget Street, Oldham Crescent and Collick Street
- 511 and 513 Fremantle Station to Murdoch Station – serve Winterfold Road
- 998 Fremantle Station to Fremantle Station (limited stops) – CircleRoute Clockwise, serves South Street
- 999 Fremantle Station to Fremantle Station (limited stops) – CircleRoute Anti-Clockwise, serves South Street

== Notable residents ==
- Brenton See, muralist
