= Hamilton Hill, Western Australia =

Hamilton Hill
- Suburb
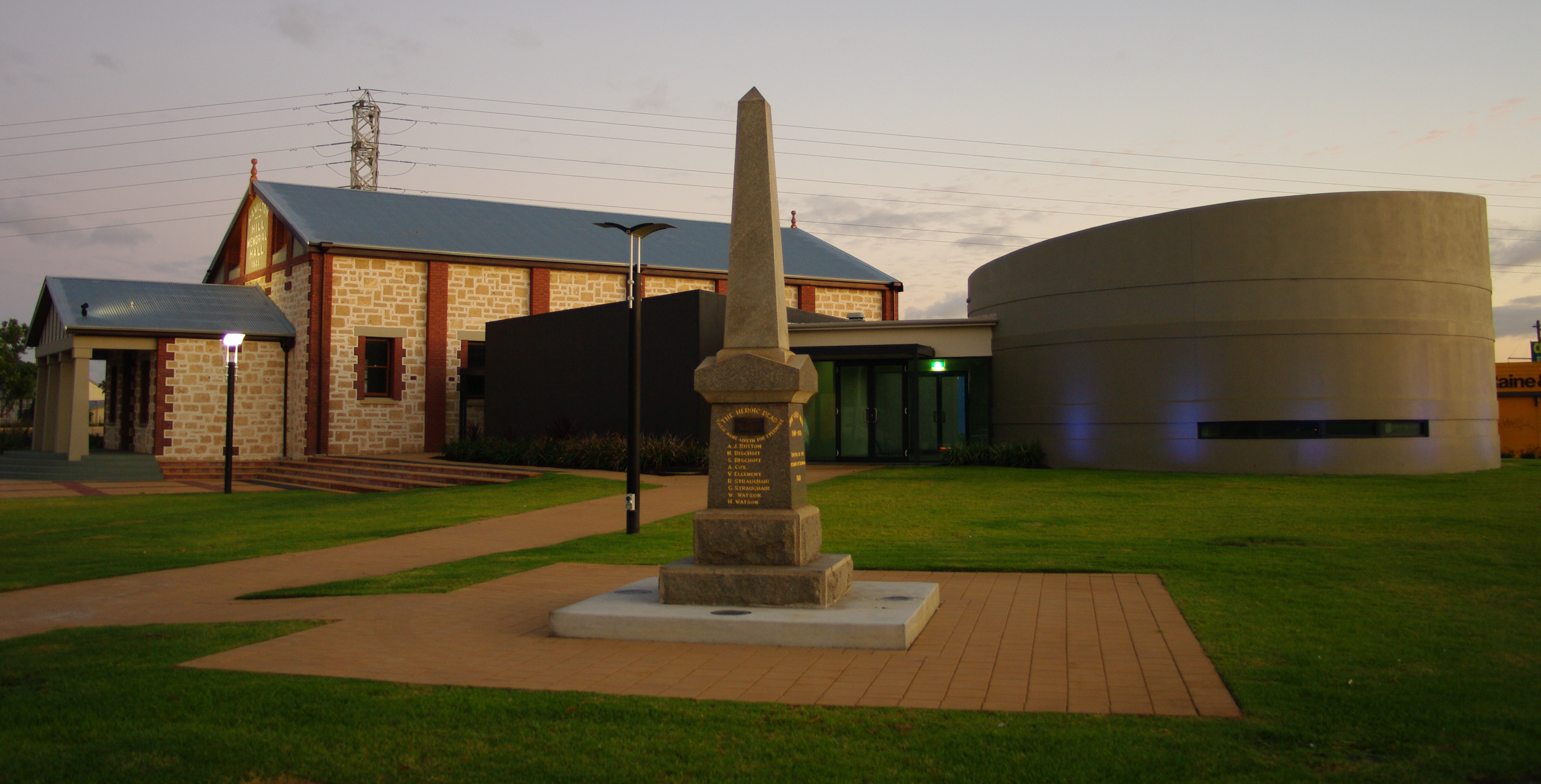
- Memorial Hall, built 1925, renovated and extended 2008
- Interactive map of Hamilton Hill
- Coordinates: 32°05′04″S 115°46′46″E
- Country: Australia
- State: Western Australia
- City: Perth
- LGA: City of Cockburn
- Location: 23 km (14 mi) SW of Perth City; 5 km (3.1 mi) S of Fremantle

Government
  - State electorate: Fremantle, Bibra Lake
  - Federal division: Fremantle

Area
  - Total: 6.6 km^{2} (2.5 sq mi)

Population
  - Total: 11,327 (SAL 2021)
- Postcode: 6163
Suburbs around Hamilton Hill
South Fremantle	Beaconsfield; Hilton	Samson
North Coogee	Hamilton Hill	Coolbellup
Spearwood	Spearwood	Bibra Lake

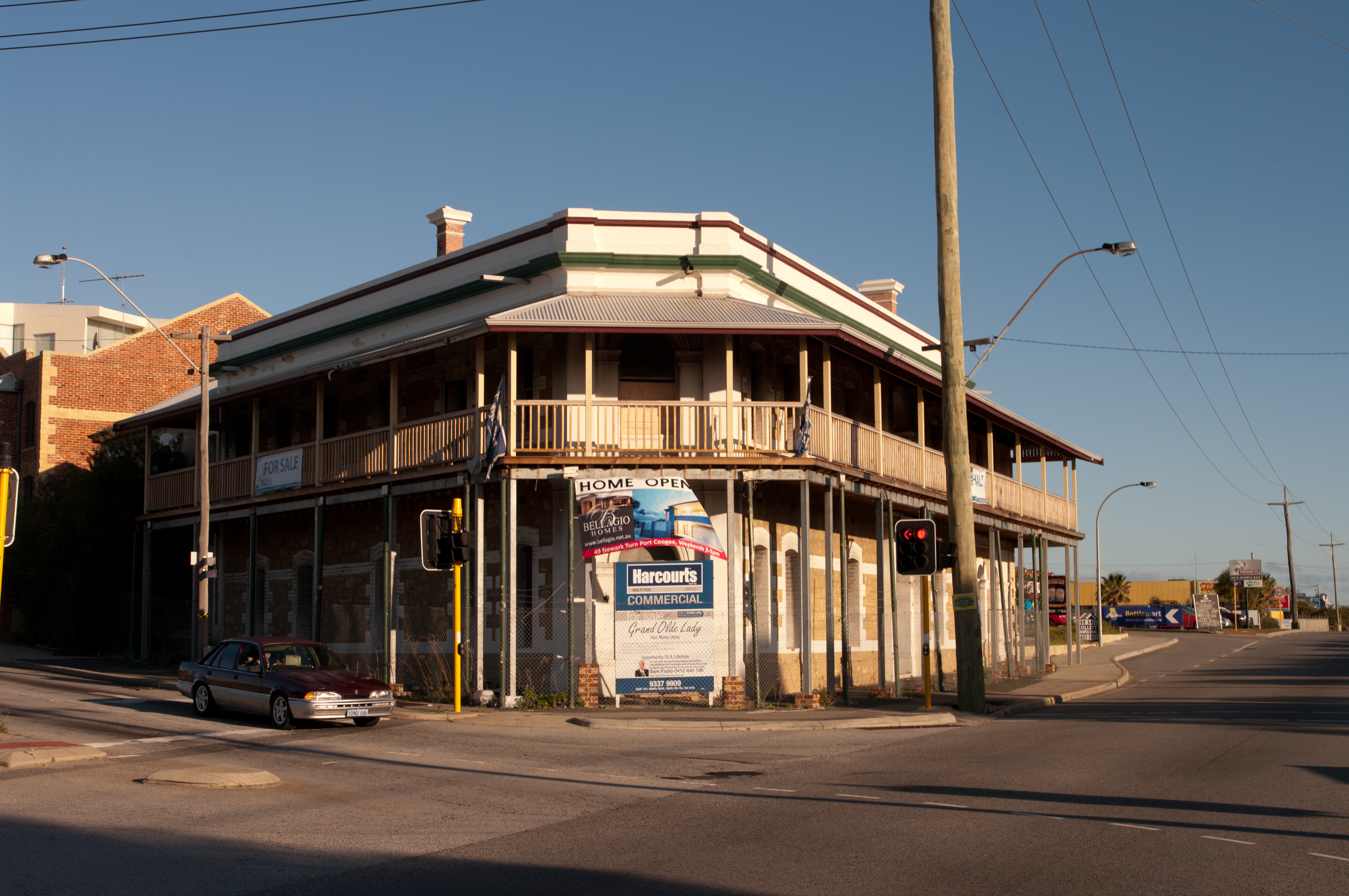
Newmarket Hotel, local focal point for the horse racing industry

Hamilton Hill is a suburb of Perth, the capital city of Western Australia, located 23 kilometres (14 mi) southwest the central business district. Its local government area is the City of Cockburn.

== History ==
The earliest known settler at Hamilton Hill was Sydney Smith, the agent of Captain George Robb. Robb arrived in Western Australia in 1830 and took up land south of Fremantle. During the next twelve months Smith was actively engaged in establishing Robb's farm. In a letter dated 27 August 1830, he gives his address as Hamilton Hill. The origin of the name, and whether it was Robb or Smith who did the naming, remains uncertain but the area has been known as such ever since.

In 1860 Charles Alexander Manning bought 364 ha (900 acres) of Robb's land, and six years later built Davilak House for his son Lucius Manning. The house of twelve rooms, was built using convict labour and was owned by the Manning family until they abandoned it in the late 1950s. It burnt down in 1960, and after this the Shire of Cockburn took over the administration of the whole estate.

A second homestead was built in 1920 by the eldest daughter of Lucius Manning, Azelia Ley. She had married John Morgan Ley in 1900, and after he died in 1927 she continued to maintain the family farm. This house became derelict after Azelia died in 1954, but was restored by the Historical Society of Cockburn in 1983 and now serves as a comprehensive Azelia Ley Homestead Museum of artefacts pertaining to the Cockburn district.

At the turn of the century South Fremantle and the northern parts of Cockburn like Hamilton Hill became the location of semi rural industries such as market gardening and horse racing stables.

== Geography ==
Hamilton Hill is bounded by Cockburn Road to the west, Phoenix Road to the south, Stock Road to the east and Jean Street and Winterfold Road to the north.

== Facilities ==
=== Educational ===
Hamilton Hill has three public primary schools, East Hamilton Hill Primary School, Phoenix Primary School and Southwell Primary School, and one independent combined primary and secondary school, Fremantle Christian College. With the merger of the long-serving public Hamilton Senior High School with a nearby school and closure of the site in late 2017, Fremantle Christian College remains the only mainstream secondary school in Hamilton Hill.

=== Recreational ===
Manning Reserve is a 900-acre (3.6 km^{2}) reserve in southwestern Hamilton Hill. Its name comes from the family who were well known in the area from 1859 onwards.

=== Cultural ===
A historical building, the Azelia Ley Homestead Museum, is located within the boundaries of Manning Reserve. This building was restored by the Cockburn Council and prominent residents in 1983.

Randwick Stable, Hamilton Hill, is a heritage listed, working horse stable that adjoins Clontarf Hill another landmark in Hamilton Hill. The stables complex was erected in the 1920s for Frederick Charles John "Jack" Marks, one of the prominent horse-racing Marks family.

Horse racing played an integral role in the development of South Fremantle and Hamilton Hill with the first horse races in the Swan River Colony held at South Beach on 3 October 1833. Horse stables were a characteristic feature in residential areas located near South Beach. At the height of the horse racing industry it is believed 400 horses were stabled in the area and trained at South Beach.

Randwick Stables comprises a series of paddocks, a timber framed bungalow, stables, laundry stone well, water closet and metal clad stables.

Randwick Stables is now occupied by tenants and continues to operate as a licensed stable.
