= City of Fremantle =

Local government area of Western Australia

Coordinates: 32°03′25″S 115°44′38″E

- Local government area
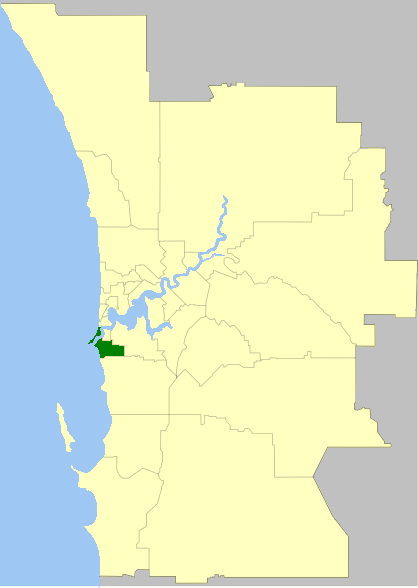
- The City of Fremantle within the Perth Metropolitan Area

- Interactive map of City of Fremantle
- Country: Australia
- State: Western Australia
- Region: Southern Metropolitan Perth
- Established: 1871
- Council seat: Fremantle

Government
  - Mayor: Ben Lawver
  - State electorate: Fremantle, Bibra Lake, Cottesloe
  - Federal division: Fremantle

Area
  - Total: 19.0 km^{2} (7.3 sq mi)

Population
  - Total: 31,930 (LGA 2021)
- Website: City of Fremantle
LGAs around City of Fremantle
Indian Ocean	Mosman Park	East Fremantle
Indian Ocean	City of Fremantle	Melville
Indian Ocean	Cockburn	Cockburn

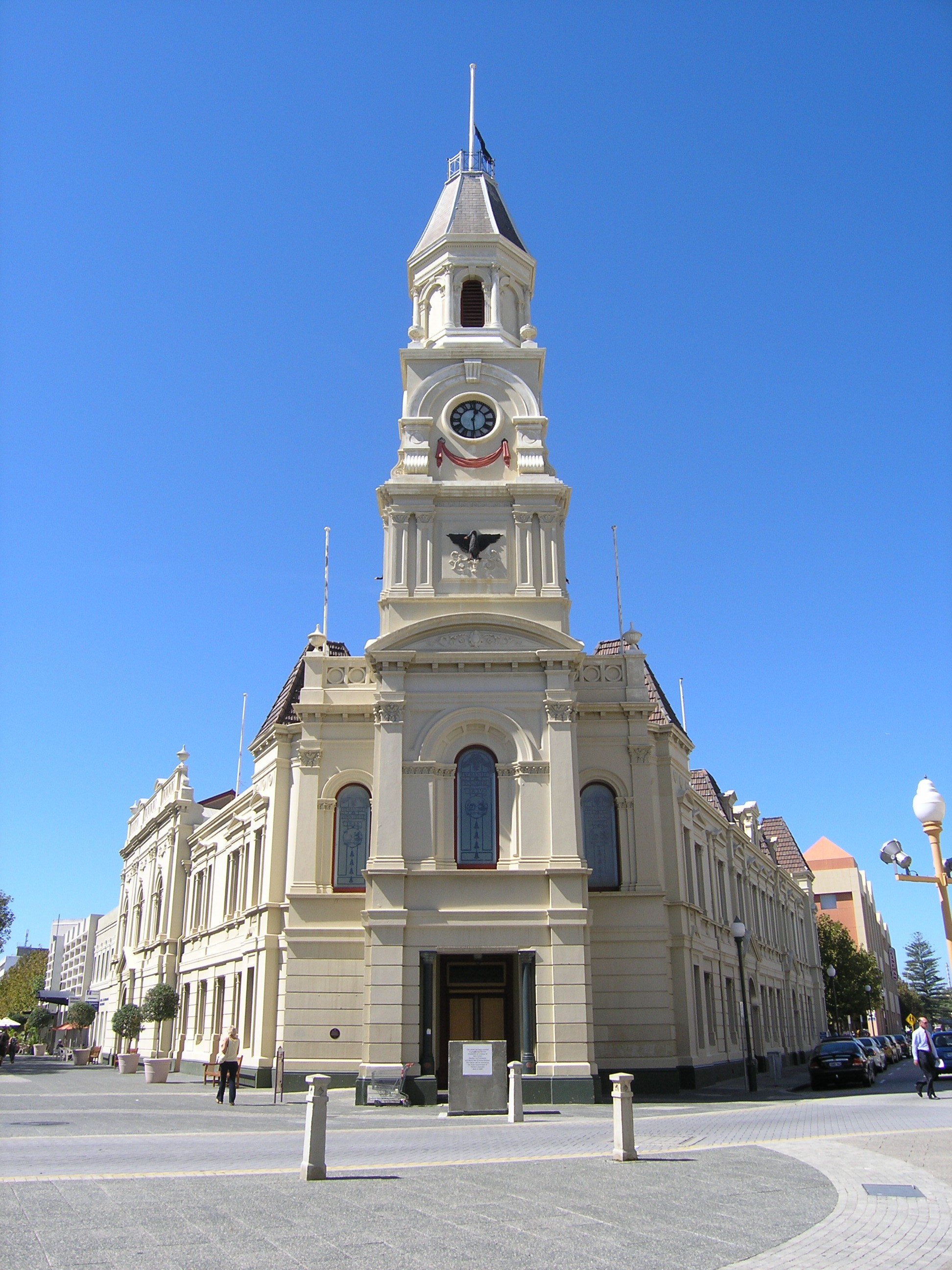
Fremantle Town Hall

The City of Fremantle is a local government area in the south of Perth, Western Australia. The City covers an area of 19.0 square kilometres (7.3 sq mi), and lies about 19 kilometres (12 mi) southwest of the Perth central business district.

== History ==
The City of Fremantle is named after Charles Fremantle, who in 1829 claimed for George IV "all that part of New Holland (Australia) which is not included within the territory of New South Wales". In 1848 a town trust was formed comprising a chairman and a committee of five. For the next twenty-three years they set about constructing roads and many public buildings with the use of convict labour. By 1870 the population of Fremantle had reached 3,796 and it was a moderately flourishing town, resulting in a move among the colonists to secure greater control of the management of their affairs.

The Municipality of Fremantle was formed on 21 February 1871, with the new council having a chairman and nine councillors. Two of the major achievements of the town council were a reliable supply of pure water and a more efficient system of sanitation. By 1928 Fremantle had a population of 22,340 and an annual revenue of £73,354 – enough to warrant a claim for city status. The City of Fremantle assumed its current name when city status was conferred upon Fremantle on 3 June 1929 as a Centenary of Western Australia honour.

North Fremantle, originally part of Fremantle, broke away in October 1895 to become an independent municipality. The first mayor of North Fremantle was Daniel Keen Congdon. The two municipalities were reunited by an order of the Governor in Executive Council as from 1 November 1961.

== Wards ==
The City is divided into six wards, each electing two councillors. Each councillor serves a four-year term, and half-elections are held every two years. The mayor is directly elected.

- North Ward
- Hilton Ward
- South Ward
- Beaconsfield Ward
- City Ward
- East Ward

== Mayors of Fremantle ==
The mayor of Fremantle as of October 2026 is Ben Lawver, who is an Independent.

== Suburbs ==
The suburbs of the City of Fremantle with population and size figures based on the most recent Australian census:

Suburb	Population	Area	Map
Beaconsfield	5,315 (SAL 2021)	2.7 km^{2} (1.0 sq mi)	
Fremantle	9,251 (SAL 2021)	5.5 km^{2} (2.1 sq mi)	
Hilton	4,323 (SAL 2021)	1.7 km^{2} (0.66 sq mi)	
North Fremantle	3,947 (SAL 2021)	3.3 km^{2} (1.3 sq mi)	
O'Connor	460 (SAL 2021)	1.9 km^{2} (0.73 sq mi)	
Samson	1,881 (SAL 2021)	1.1 km^{2} (0.42 sq mi)	
South Fremantle	3,398 (SAL 2021)	1.5 km^{2} (0.58 sq mi)	
White Gum Valley	3,358 (SAL 2021)	1.2 km^{2} (0.46 sq mi)	

East Fremantle has its own town council and is not governed by the City of Fremantle.

== Population ==
Historical population

Year	Pop.	±% p.a.
1911	14,499	—
1921	17,566	+1.94%
1933	16,998	−0.27%
1947	18,791	+0.72%
1954	22,795	+2.80%
1961	21,980	−0.52%
1966	25,284	+2.84%
1971	26,036	+0.59%
1976	23,497	−2.03%

Year	Pop.	±% p.a.
1981	22,484	−0.88%
1986	22,709	+0.20%
1991	23,687	+0.85%
1996	24,022	+0.28%
2001	24,713	+0.57%
2006	24,835	+0.10%
2011	26,582	+1.37%
2016	28,893	+1.68%
2021	31,930	+2.02%

- The 1961 population of the former Town of North Fremantle was 2,363.

== Economy ==
The economy of the city is highly stable and diversified with various local businesses trading successfully in the vicinity. The key industries include port and shipping, regional and state government services, hospital and community services, tourism, education, retail, etc. In 2014, over 4,472 registered businesses were operating in the city and the size of the workforce in the city centre had reached 8,849 in 2011.

== Sister city relations ==
Fremantle has sister city relationships with five other cities. They are (in chronological order):

- Seberang Perai, Malaysia (since 1978)
- Yokosuka, Japan (since 1979)
- Capo d'Orlando, Italy (since 1983)
- Molfetta, Italy (since 1984)
- Funchal, Portugal (since 1996)

Fremantle also has friendship-city relationships with three cities:

- Surabaya, Indonesia (since 1996)
- Padang, Indonesia (since 1996)
- Korčula, Croatia (since 1999)

== See also ==
- Fremantle Town Hall
