= Leeming Senior High School =

Location
- Aulberry Parade, Leeming, Western Australia; Australia; 32°04′32″S 115°51′25″E

Information
- Type: Public co-educational high school
- Motto: Harmony – Excellence
- Established: 1985; 41 years ago
- Educational authority: WA Department of Education
- Principal: Matthew Paton
- Years: 7–12
- Enrolment: 990 (2015)
- Campus type: Suburban
- Colours: Navy blue and red
- Website: leeming.wa.edu.au

Leeming Senior High School is a public co-educational high school, located in the City of Melville on Aulberry Parade in the Perth suburb of Leeming, Western Australia.

== History ==
The school was established in 1985 and caters for students from Year 7 to Year 12.

The number of student enrolments has declined over the last five years. The school enrolled 1147 students in 2007, then 1074 in 2008, to 1018 in 2009, then fell to 882 in 2010 and to 809 in 2011. The fall in student numbers from 2010 is a result of the enrolment age changing for students entering high school in Western Australia.

The school received substantial funding as part of the "Becoming Asia Literate" program in 2010.

The school was ranked in the top 50 Western Australian schools by Australian Tertiary Admission Rank (ATAR) for 2015 by percentage.

== Subjects offered ==
Leeming Senior High School operates a number of lower and upper school subject areas, including maths, science (physics, chemistry, biology, human biology, psychology), modern history, economics, geography, English and electives, including The Arts, Wood and Metal Work, and Information technology, Sports and others.

The school operates ATAR, general and certificate courses as well as providing information about university and TAFE pre-requisites. It also provides alternative pathways as of 2023.

The school offers two foreign languages: French and Japanese, including foreign exchange and excursion programmes.

== Catchment area ==
Leeming's catchment area has been specified by the WA Department of Education to include the suburbs of Bateman, Bull Creek, Leeming. Leeming's feeder primary schools are Banksia Park, Bateman, Bull Creek, Leeming, Oberthur and West Leeming.

Its neighbouring government high schools are Rossmoyne to the north, Melville to the west, Lakeland to the south and Willetton to east.

Its neighbouring private high schools are All Saints College to the north, Corpus Christi and Kennedy Baptist College to the west.

== Notable alumni ==
- Jason Johannisen - former AFL premiership player for the Western Bulldogs, 2016 Norm Smith Medalist
- Trent Rivers - AFL player for the Melbourne Demons
- Shannon Neale - AFL player for the Geelong Football Club

== See also ==
- List of schools in the Perth metropolitan area
