= North Lake, Western Australia =

North Lake
- Suburb
- Interactive map of North Lake
- Coordinates: 32°04′50″S 115°49′55″E
- Country: Australia
- State: Western Australia
- City: Perth
- LGA: City of Cockburn
- Location: 18 km (11 mi) S of Perth

Government
  - State electorate: Bibra Lake
  - Federal division: Fremantle

Area
  - Total: 2.3 km^{2} (0.89 sq mi)

Population
  - Total: 1,299 (SAL 2021)
- Postcode: 6163
Suburbs around North Lake
| Kardinya | Murdoch | Leeming |
| Coolbellup | North Lake | Leeming |
| Bibra Lake | Bibra Lake | Jandakot |

North Lake is a suburb located 18 kilometres (11 mi) south of the central business district of Perth, the capital of Western Australia, and 8 kilometres (5 mi) from the Indian Ocean. Named after the eponymous lake, the suburb and lake are located within the City of Cockburn local government area.

== Geography ==
The suburb is named after the lake of the same name within the locality. It is part of the northernmost lake within a chain of lakes which make up the Beeliar Regional Park (North Lake, Bibra Lake, South Lake, Booragoon Lake, Yangebup Lake, and Thomsons Lake). The lake has been known by this name since 1877, and the name was approved for the suburb in 1954.

The suburb is located on the northern edge of the City of Cockburn. It is bounded by Farrington Road to the north, the Kwinana Freeway to the east, the Roe Highway road reservation to the south and North Lake Road to the west.

=== Education ===
There are no schools within the suburb, with many North Lake residents using the state government primary schools in Coolbellup and Kardinya. Directly to the north of the suburb lies Murdoch University and Kennedy Baptist College.

=== Recreation ===
The Lakeside Recreation Centre is located in North Lake on the corner of Farrington Road and Bibra Drive. It is home to four basketball courts, a Baptist church, a gym, and a creche. Lakeside Recreation Centre is the home court of the State Basketball League team, the Lakeside Lightning.

Apart from North Lake and the surrounding Beeliar Regional Park, the suburb contains the Perth Spanish Club, a golf driving range, Adventure World, Cockburn Ice Skating arena, and an adventure playground next to the lake at Progress Drive.

== Transport ==
=== Bus ===
- 512 Murdoch Station to Fremantle Station – serves Murdoch Drive, Bibra Drive and Farrington Road
- 514 Murdoch Station to Cockburn Central Station – serves Murdoch Drive, Bibra Drive and Farrington Road
