= Kardinya, Western Australia =

Suburb of Perth, Western Australia

Kardinya
- Suburb
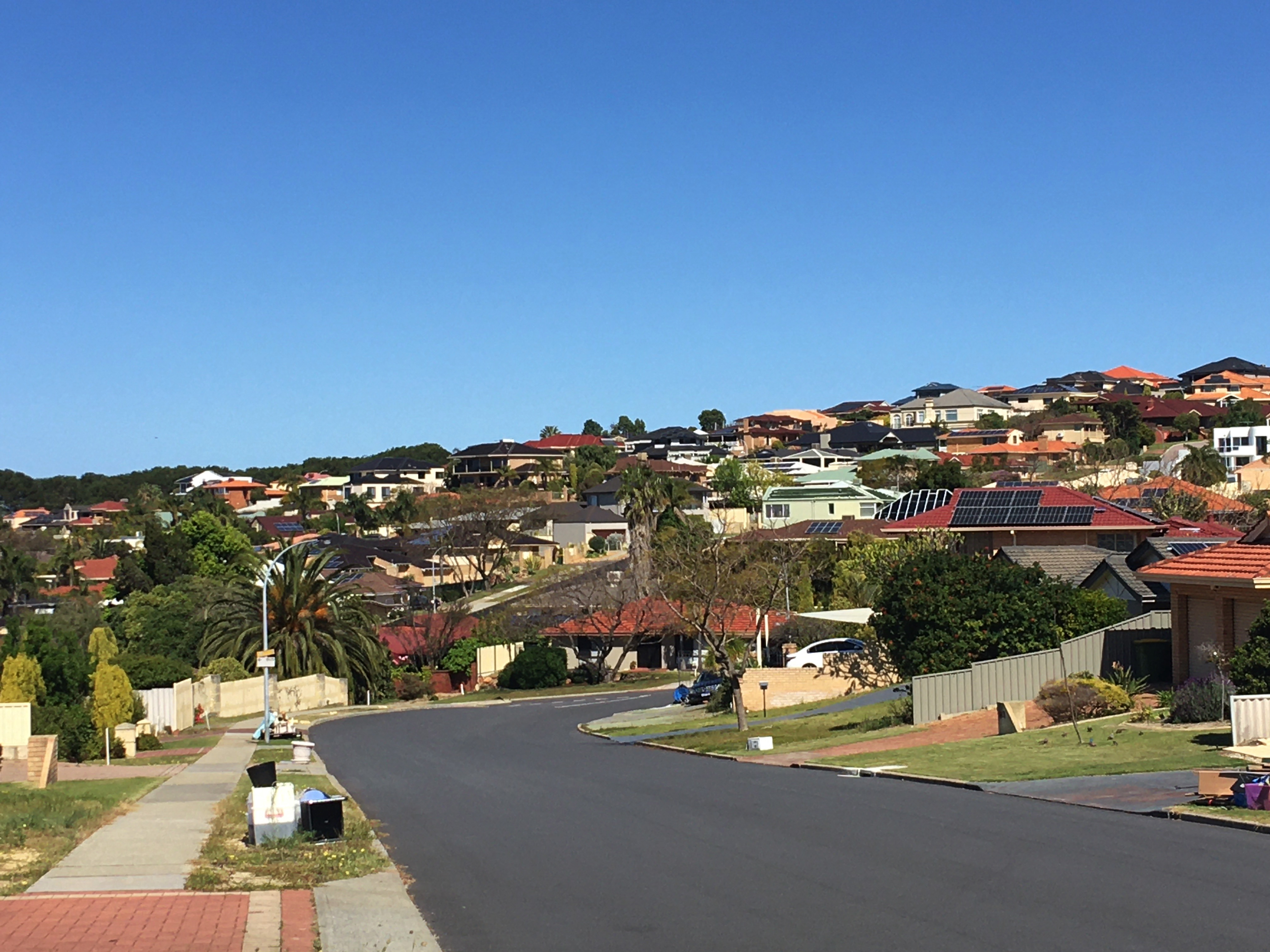
- Houses in Kardinya
- Interactive map of Kardinya
- Coordinates: 32°03′56″S 115°48′53″E
- Country: Australia
- State: Western Australia
- City: Perth
- LGA: City of Melville
- Location: 12 km (7.5 mi) from Perth

Government
  - State electorate: Bibra Lake, Bateman, Bicton
  - Federal division: Fremantle, Tangney

Area
  - Total: 4.38 km^{2} (1.69 sq mi)

Population
  - Total: 9,137 (SAL 2021)
- Postcode: 6163
Suburbs around Kardinya
Willagee	Winthrop	Winthrop
O'Connor	Kardinya	Murdoch
Samson	Coolbellup	North Lake

Kardinya is a suburb 13 kilometres (8 mi) south-southwest of the central business district of Perth, the capital of Western Australia. Located in the City of Melville local government area, it is predominantly a low-density residential suburb consisting of single-family detached homes. There is a commercial area in the centre of the suburb, with a shopping centre and several other shops. In the northwest is a small light industrial area. Kardinya has a population of 8,730 people.

Before European settlement, the area was inhabited by the Beeliar group of the Whadjuk Noongar people. Kardinya did not attract any interest from Europeans when the Swan River Colony was founded in 1829, as it was far away from any river and infertile. European use of Kardinya began in 1870 when fourteen lots were allocated to Pensioner Guards. These lots were used for piggeries, poultry farms and vineyards. In 1904, a large amount of land in the area was set aside as endowment land for the University of Western Australia. In the 1920s, this land started to be used as a pine plantation, known as the Applecross Pine Plantation, and, after 1947, the Somerville Pine Plantation. The suburb was formally gazetted on 16 June 1961. From 1967 to the early 1980s, suburban development occurred in Kardinya.

Current amenities in Kardinya include Kardinya Primary School, North Lake Senior Campus, Kardinya Park Shopping Centre, and Morris Buzacott Reserve, which is home to several sports clubs. The suburb is quadrisected by South Street and North Lake Road. Transperth bus services operate, most feeding into Murdoch railway station on the Mandurah line.

== History ==
=== Before British colonisation ===
Before European settlement, the area was inhabited by the Beeliar group of the Whadjuk Noongar people, who had lived there for 40,000 years. They lived in the area south from the Swan River down to Mangles Bay near Rockingham and east to the Darling Scarp. No specific sites of Aboriginal occupation have been found in Kardinya as there are no wetlands there, however, the Beeliar people would have passed through Kardinya.

=== British colonisation ===
Kardinya attracted no interest from the British when they founded the Swan River Colony in 1829. All settlement was concentrated along the Swan and Canning rivers as they were the main method of transportation in the early decades of the colony. Kardinya also had no fertile soil for the crops and fruit trees grown at the time. Only one section of land in Kardinya was part of the early land that was granted to settlers; it was known as Cockburn Location 549; none of the Kardinya section of that land was used.

In 1870, fourteen smaller lots were excised from Cockburn Location 549. Over the following fifteen years, they were allocated to Pensioner Guards – British army veterans who received a pension after having completed their period of service or been wounded. They served on convict transportation ships to Western Australia. Their role in the colony was to help maintain law and order, and serve as a presence of authority towards the convicts. To ensure the Pensioner Guards stay in the colony, they were allocated land which they had to occupy for seven years before they could gain ownership. Convicts were forced to clear the land for the Pensioner Guards. These Pensioner Guard lots were passed down to their descendants. At the beginning of World War I, most lots were still owned by descendants of Pensioner Guards.

Two roads were built in the early 20th century – South Street, which ran from Fremantle west of Kardinya to the eastern edge of Kardinya, and North Lake Road, which ran from Canning Highway north of Kardinya to Bibra Lake in the south, continuing as Forrest Road to Armadale. At first, these roads were just cleared tracks consisting of sand, but after World War I, they were laid with planks.

During the early 20th century, these lots were used as piggeries, poultry farms and vineyards. The remaining area was Fremantle Commonage, meaning residents of Fremantle could freely cut timber. This changed in 1904 when an act of the Parliament of Western Australia set aside the land north, west and east of the Pensioner Guard lots as endowment land for the University of Western Australia (UWA), which was being planned at the time. The university did not end up using the land, but in 1922, it asked the Forests Department to police it for the illegal removal of timber.

In 1924, the Bibra and North Lake Progress Association asked UWA and the Forests Department if part of the land could be used as a pine plantation. They agreed to the land being used for that purpose for 50 years. In 1926, 382 hectares (945 acres) of land was cleared, and planted mainly with pinus pinaster (maritime pine). At a high point on South Street, a house for plantation staff was built, and a fire lookout was built on a nearby tree. A second lookout tower was built in 1965. There were never any large fires at the plantation, but several smaller ones were spotted and put out over the years. Initially, the plantation was known as the Applecross Pine Plantation, but it was renamed to the Somerville Pine Plantation in 1946, after William Somerville, a prominent person at UWA, being acting vice-chancellor, pro-chancellor and acting chancellor at times. Many streets in Kardinya are now also named after prominent people from UWA.

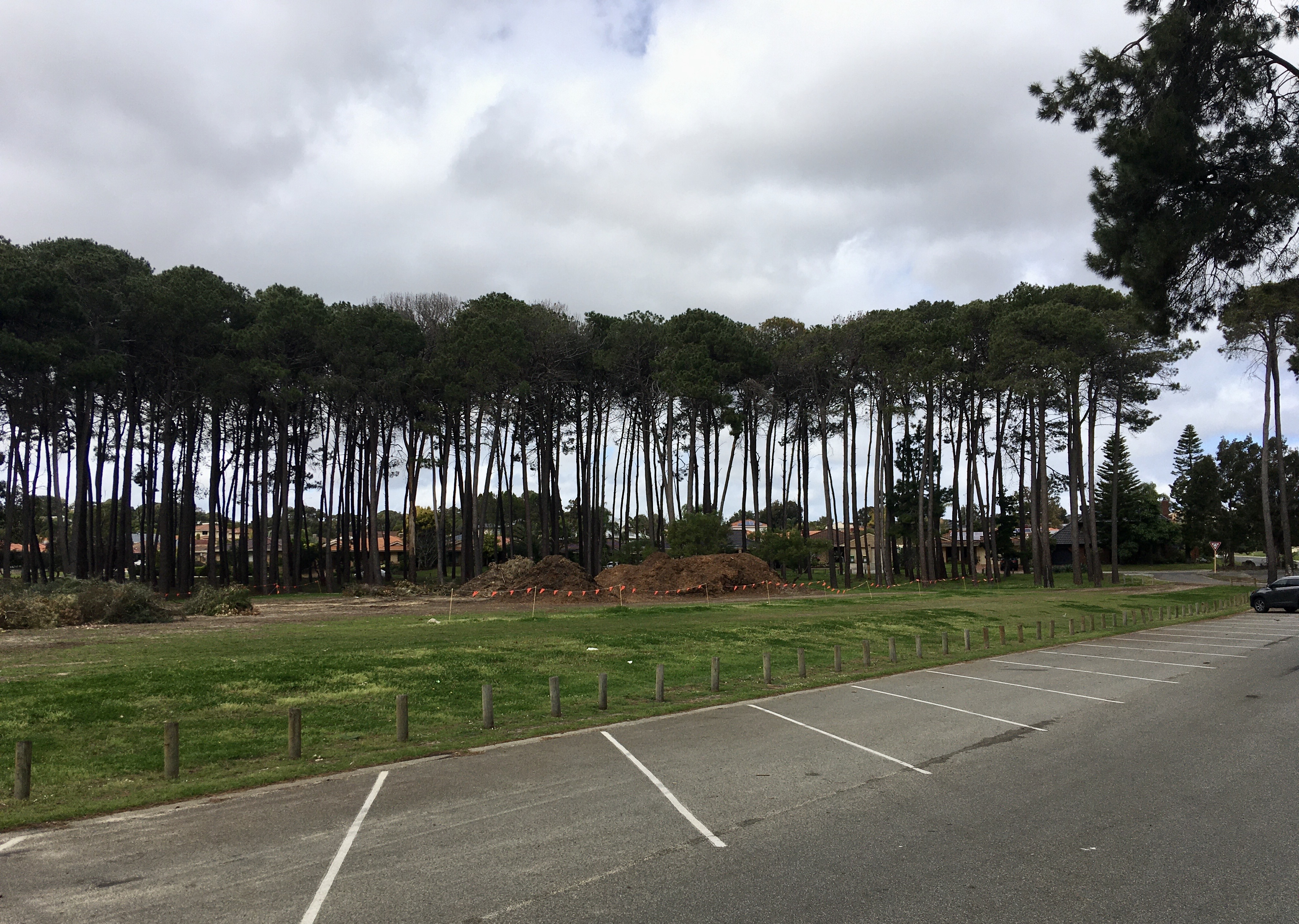
Maritime pines left over from the Somerville Pine Plantation at Morris Buzacott Reserve.

The trees in the plantation began to mature in the late 1950s, with harvesting commencing then. The largest trees were removed first, allowing the others to grow further. Clearcutting began in the 1960s as Kardinya was planned to have a housing development. This finished in 1975; the university sold most of the land to developers. The south-eastern corner, just beyond Kardinya's boundary, was used to make Murdoch University, Perth's second university. Some trees were left standing, which can still be seen today.

=== Suburban development ===
The area was originally named Ellis, after J. E. Ellis, a long time secretary of the Melville Roads Board. The name "Kardinya" was first suggested as a street name in the area in 1955. The name is of Aboriginal origin. Some sources say it means "sunrise", whilst others say it means "place of the Karda (racehorse goanna)". Later, a vote was held for residents to decide between Ellis and Kardinya as the name for the suburb. Kardinya received all but one vote. The suburb was formally gazetted by the Department of Lands and Surveys on 16 June 1961.

In 1958, seven residents requested permission from the Melville council to subdivide their land, however others opposed this, wanting to retain the area's rural character. The opposers wanted no block to be smaller than 1 hectare (2.5 acres), and so the request was denied. Plans for housing development in Kardinya's north-eastern quadrant began in 1960. On 5 October 1967, first building approval was given, and development of the north-eastern quadrant began. The south-eastern quadrant was developed in the 1970s, followed by the south-western quadrant. North Lake Senior High School opened in the south-western quadrant at the start of 1973, a shopping centre opened on the north-east corner of South Street and North Lake Road in 1976, and Kardinya Primary School opened in the north-eastern quadrant at the start of 1977. The Kardinya Precinct Committee (KPC) was formed in the early 1970s, and renamed the Kardinya Residents Association in the late 1970s. This association was heavily involved in the development of Kardinya, providing input for planning schools, shopping centres, bus routes and community services. The final quadrant, the north-eastern quadrant, was developed in the 1980s.

During the early 21st century, many 1960s and 1970s houses have begun to be demolished for further subdivision.

== Geography and nature ==
Kardinya is located 13 kilometres (8 mi) south-southwest of the central business district (CBD) of Perth, the capital of Western Australia, and 6 kilometres (4 mi) east of the Indian Ocean. It covers an area of 4.38 square kilometres (1.69 sq mi), and is bounded to the north by Garling Street, North Lake Road and Somerville Boulevard, to the east by Prescott Drive, South Street and Windelya Way, to the south by Farrington Road, North Lake Road and Winterfold Road, and to the west by a high-voltage power line. To the north is Willagee and Winthrop, to the east is Murdoch, to the south is North Lake and Coolbellup, and to the west is Samson and O'Connor.

Kardinya lies mostly on Spearwood dunes, which formed around 40,000 years ago. The dunes consist of brown sand lying over yellow subsoil, with Tamala Limestone below. The limestone is close to the surface in parts. A small area on the eastern edge of the suburb lies on Bassendean dunes, which consist of white to grey sands formed between 800,000 and 125,000 years ago. Both are part of the greater Swan Coastal Plain. Whilst Kardinya does not contain any natural wetlands, North Lake is located immediately to the east of the suburb.

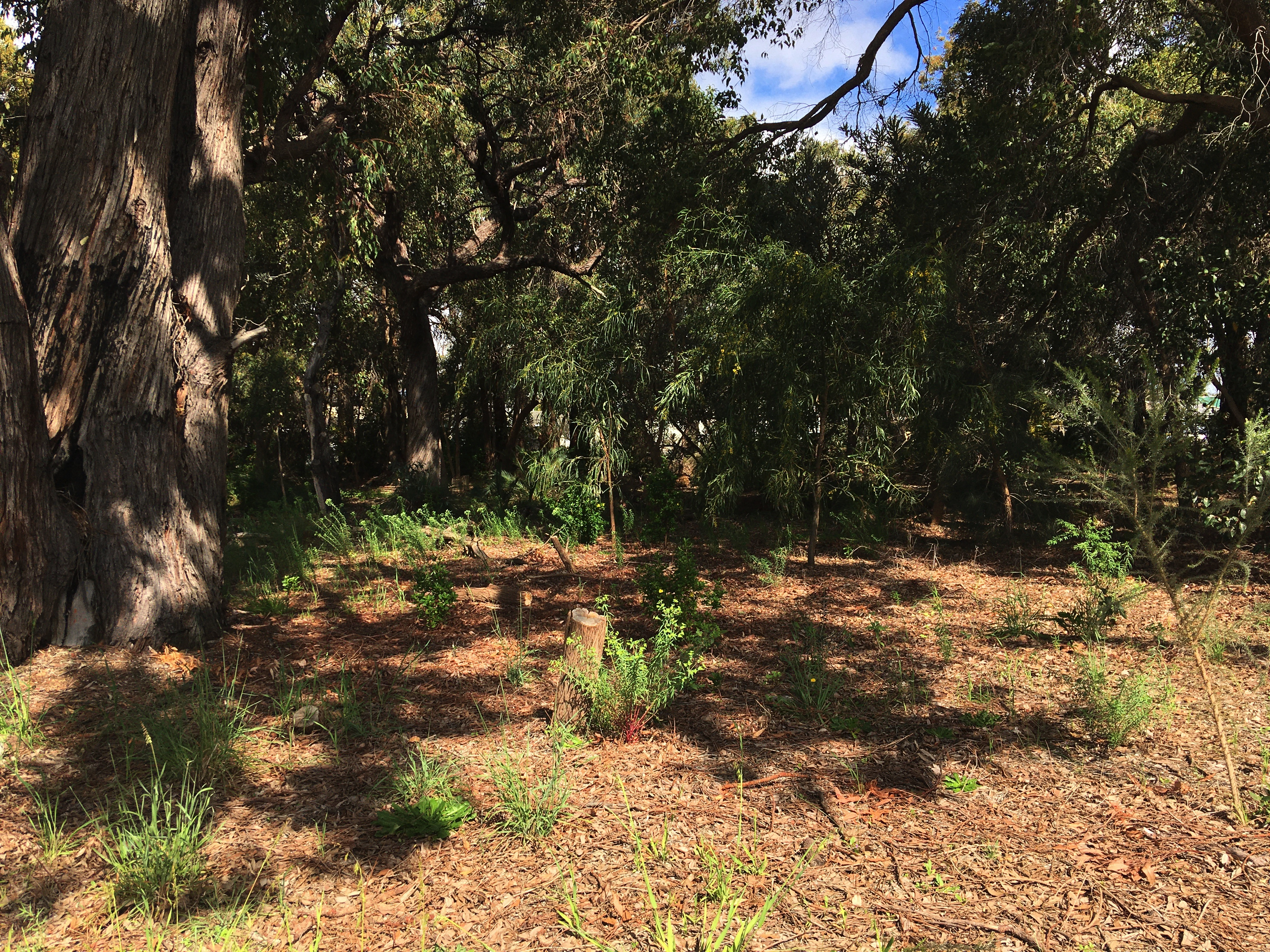
Harold Field Reserve

The area's original vegetation would have been a forest consisting primarily of Eucalyptus gomphocephala (tuart), with Eucalyptus marginata (jarrah), Corymbia calophylla (marri), Banksia attenuata (slender banksia), Banksia grandis (bull banksia), and Casuarinaceae (sheoak) interspersed. Smaller trees include black wattles and two species of stinkwood, and other plants include zamias and grass trees/balgas. No rare species are known to have been in the area. Small amounts of the original vegetation were cleared by early settlers in the 19th century and early 20th century to make way for homes, raising animals and vineyards, but most of it was cleared in the 1920s for the pine plantation. A small area of natural bushland remains as Harold Field Reserve, although it has been invaded by weeds that hinder small native plants. Arctotheca calendula (capeweed) is a common weed in the area that was purposefully introduced. Other weeds were introduced accidentally, including Eragrostis curvula (African lovegrass), Ehrharta longiflora (annual veldtgrass), Polycarpon tetraphyllum (fourleaf allsead), Romulea rosea (Guildford grass), Trifolium campestre (hop clover), Euphorbia peplus (petty spurge), Carpobrotus (pigface), Plantago major (plantain), Lolium (ryegrass), Oxalis pes-caprae (soursob), Sonchus arvensis (sowthistle), and Ursinia.

== Demographics ==
Kardinya's population has been on a slight decline from 2001 to 2016. The suburb was home to 8,730 people according to the Australian Bureau of Statistics's 2016 census, compared to 8,794 at the 2011 census, 8,874 at the 2006 census, and 8,935 at the 2001 census. At the 2016 census, 49.6% of residents were male and 50.4% were female. The median age was 41, which was above the state and national averages of 36 and 38 respectively.

At the 2016 census, 75.7% of Kardinya households were families, above the state average of 72.7%; 19.5% were single-person households, below the state average of 23.6%; and 4.8% were group households, above the state average of 3.8%. Of those family households, 40.0% were couples without children, 44.0% were couples with children, 13.4% were single parents with children, and 2.7% were some other type of family. These figures are all close to the state averages of 38.5%, 45.3%, 14.5% and 1.7% respectively.

Out of the suburb's 3,523 dwellings, 3,197 were occupied and 326 were unoccupied at the 2016 census. Out of the 3,197 that were occupied, 2,772 were detached houses, 311 were semi-detached, and 105 were flats or apartments. 57.6% of occupied dwellings had four or more bedrooms, and the average number of bedrooms was 3.6, which was above the state average of 3.3. The average number of people per household was 2.6, which is the same as the state average. 1,375 dwellings (42.9%) were owned outright, significantly higher than the state average of 28.5%. 1,098 (34.3%) were owned with a mortgage, compared to the state average of 39.7%; 654 (20.4%) were rented, compared to the state average of 28.3%; and 77 (2.4%) were other or not stated.

At the 2016 census, the median weekly personal income was $676, compared to the state average of $724 and national average of $662; the median weekly family income was $1,981, compared to the state average of $1,910 and national average of $1,734; and the median weekly household income was $1,667, compared to the state average of $1,595 and the national average of $1,438. The most common occupations were professionals (25.8%), clerical and administrative workers (15.1%), technicians and trades workers (13.4%), managers (11.6%), and sales workers (10.4%). Major industries that residents worked in were hospitals (4.6%), primary education (3.4%), cafes and restaurants (3.1%), higher education (3.0%), and secondary education (2.5%). 27.7% of residents had a bachelor's degree or above, compared to the state average of 20.5%.

The most common ancestries that Kardinya residents identified with at the 2016 census were English (24.1%), Australian (19.0%), Chinese (8.4%), Italian (8.3%), and Irish (6.4%). 58.7% of residents were born in Australia. The next most common birthplaces were England (5.5%), Malaysia (2.8%), Italy (2.3%), China, excluding Taiwan and special administrative regions (2.1%), and Indonesia (2.0%). 33.5% of residents had both parents born in Australia, and 48.0% of residents had both parents born overseas. The most common religious affiliations were Catholic (30.4%), no religion (27.9%), Anglican (12.2%), and Uniting Church (3.0%).

== Businesses, parks and amenities ==
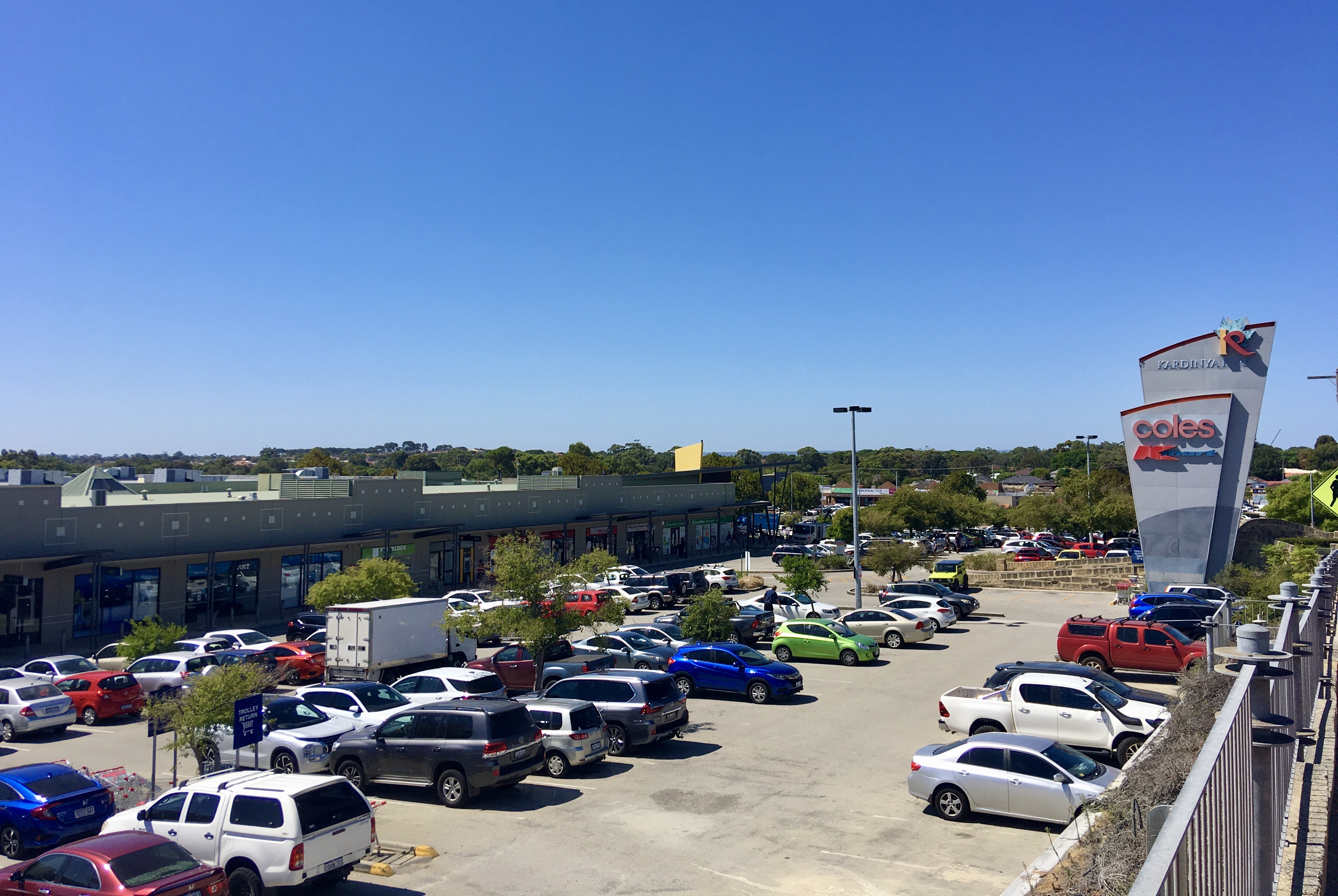
Kardinya Park Shopping Centre in March 2022

Before there were any shops in the area, residents had to travel to Fremantle or to Canning Bridge in Applecross for essential items such as groceries, and even further for other items. The first business in the area was a corner store at the junction of what was then North Lake Road and South Street, established in the 1940s. It sold groceries, had a petrol pump, and was demolished in the 1970s. In 1957, a store was established on an adjacent corner to provide petrol, servicing and repairs for vehicles. It was leased to BP in the 1970s, opening as a proper service station in 1974. That service station, as of 2022, still exists. North Lake Road was realigned about 400 metres (440 yd) west through Kardinya in the 1970s; the old North Lake Road was renamed Gilbertson Road.

In 1975, construction began on a shopping centre on the corner of the new North Lake Road alignment and South Street. The shopping centre opened in 1976. The shopping centre was expanded considerably in 1999, and was given the name Kardinya Park. Another major expansion was constructed in 2024 and 2025, adding a multistorey car park and medial centre. There are plans for future development to include apartments up to eight storeys. Today, the anchor tenants are a Coles supermarket and a Kmart retail store. Smaller tenants include an Australia Post post office, and Westpac and ANZ bank branches. Neighbouring the shopping centre is an Aldi supermarket and the Kardinya Tavern (colloquially, "the Kardy"). That pub is one of only a few within 5 kilometres (3 mi), and so it attracts people from the surrounding suburbs. The only other businesses in Kardinya are a small group of shops on the corner of Le Soeuf Drive and McMahon Way, and a light industrial area in the suburb's north-west.

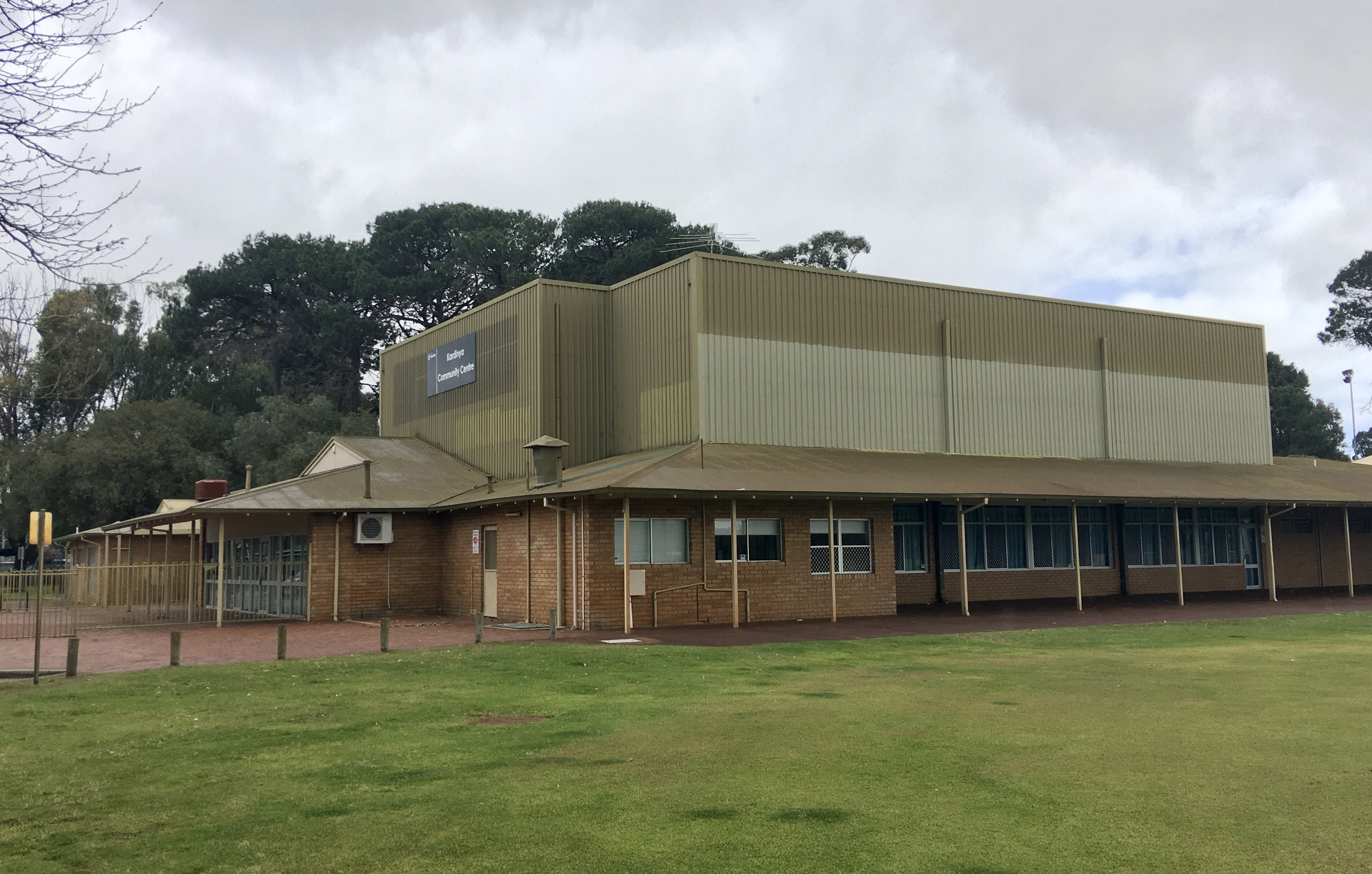
Kardinya Community Centre at Morris Buzacott Reserve.

The largest park in Kardinya is Morris Buzacott Reserve. It was named on 28 June 1977, after Morris Nutter Buzacott, who was a member of the Melville Roads Board from 1903 to 1905 and chairman in 1905. It has an area of about 20 hectares (49 acres), and is located in Kardinya's north-eastern quadrant. One of the first sports club to exist at Morris Buzacott Reserve is the Applecross Hockey Club (now the Melville City Hockey Club), which relocated there in 1979. It had its own building. In 1979, the reserve was also home to the Kardinya Tennis Club, and the Kardinya Junior Football Club (KJFC). It was a committee member of the KJFC that started the push in 1979 for a community centre to be built at Morris Buzacott Reserve. At first, the Melville City Council did not help with funding the proposed building, so a group was formed, called the Kardinya Community and Recreation Association. This group, along with the Kardinya Residents Association continued to lobby for a community centre, and in 1985, the council finally approved its construction. it was completed in 1986 and officially opened on 27 June 1987.

In 1988, a bowling club was formed, housed in a small clubhouse that was extended in 2009. In 1994, the Fremantle CBC Amateur Football Club relocated to Morris Buzacott Reserve. Around this time, the Kardinya Community and Recreation Association merged into the Kardinya Residents Association. The Fremantle CBC Amateur Football Club wanted the community centre to be expanded, and so a member of the club made an application to the Melville City Council, which the council refused. The club then applied for funds from the Federal Government, which gave them about $175,000. This funding came amidst the sports rorts affair. The council also contributed $300,000. The expanded facilities were opened in 1994. Today, the community centre is used by football clubs, a tee-ball club, and a tennis club. The initial hockey building is now also used by a cricket club.

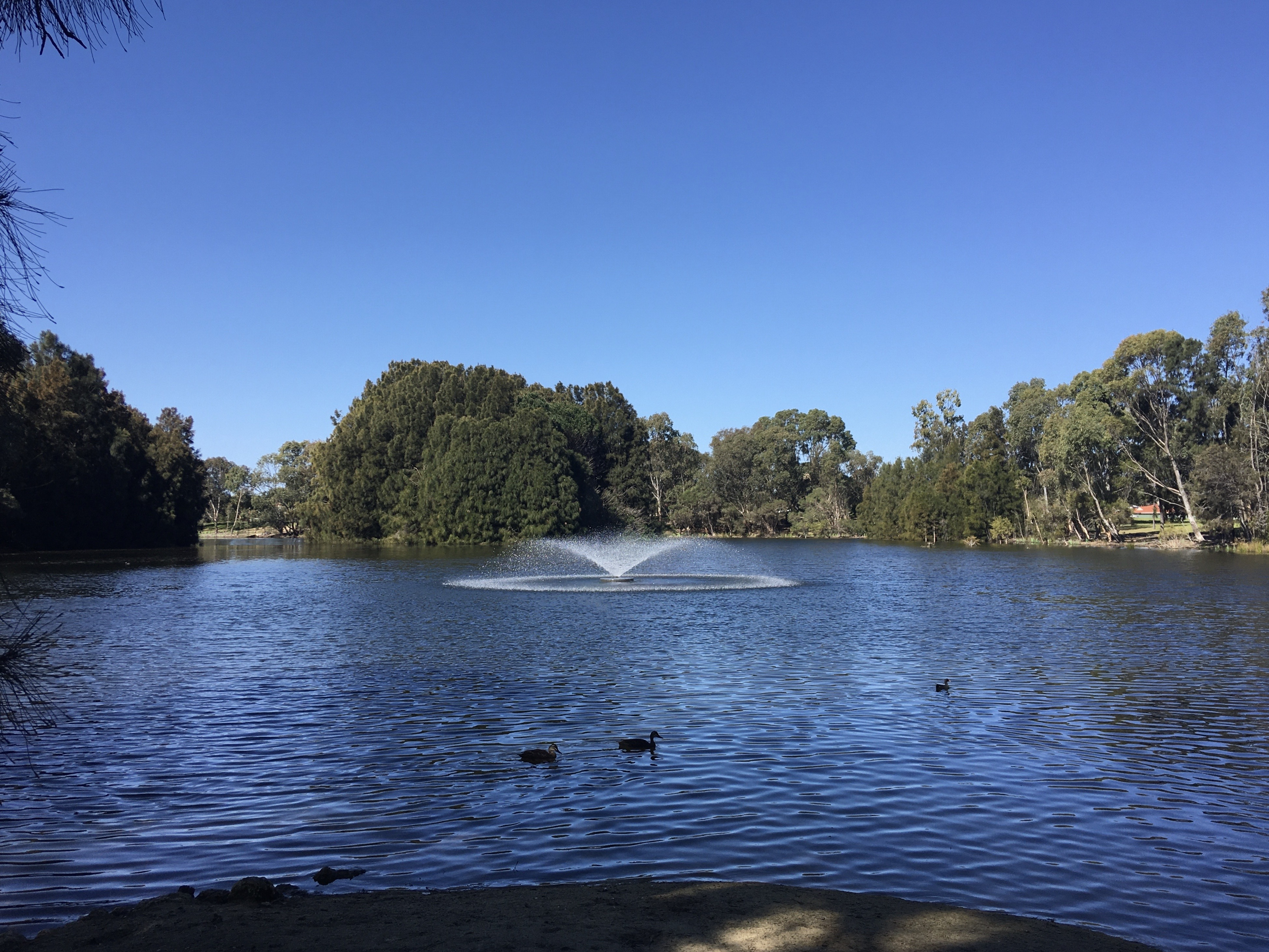
Frederick Baldwin Park.

Another large park in Kardinya is Frederick Baldwin Park. It was originally known as Somerville Lake but was renamed on 14 September 1983 in honour of J. F. Baldwin, who was a member of the Melville Roads Board from 1941 to 1944. It is in Kardinya's north-west quadrant, covers an area of 10 hectares (25 acres), and contains a lake surrounded by a grassed area. It has a playground and a community centre.

Most other parks in Kardinya are named after members of the Melville Roads Board, the exceptions being Bill Dixon Park, named after a council building surveyor; Dick Piercy Park, named after the landowner who subdivided his lot to create this park; Emma George Park, a resident from 1954 to 1992; Jack Jeffery Park, named after a council health surveyor; Red Gum Park, named after the trees at the park; Richard Angeloni Park, after a former vice-principal of UWA; and Robert Henwood Park, named after a city planner for the City of Fremantle.

== Education ==
Kardinya has two schools: Kardinya Primary School, and North Lake Senior Campus.

=== Primary ===
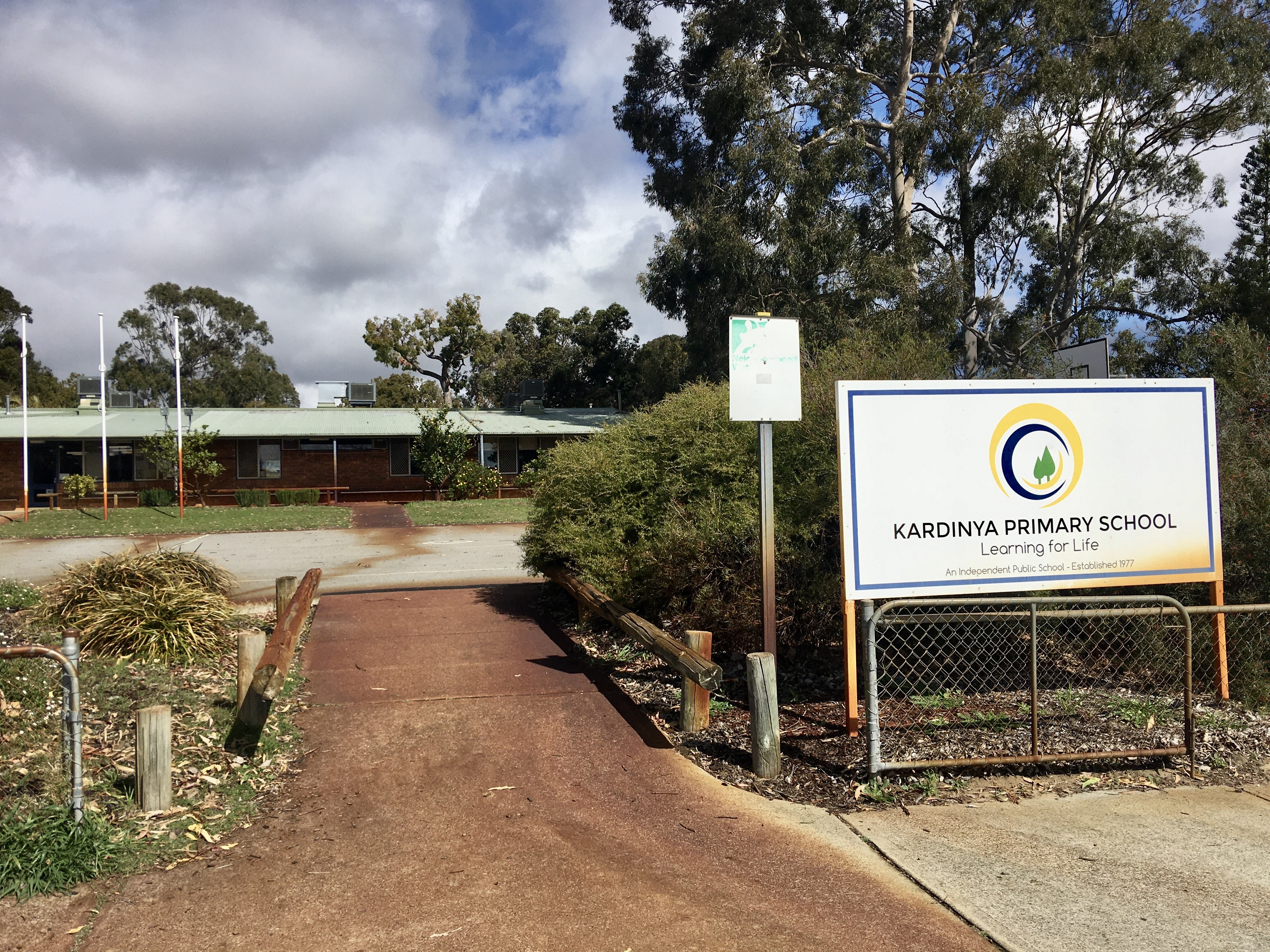
Kardinya Primary School

Before there were any schools in the area, most students attended Bibra Lake State School, which opened in 1912. Students walked, cycled, or even rode a horse there. When Carawatha Primary School opened in 1959 on the corner of North Lake Road and Archibald Street in Willagee, students attended there.

As development progressed in the 1970s, a local school was needed. Residents were approaching the state government, via the Melville Council, for a school to be built in Kardinya. A site was set aside on Ochiltree Way, and in June 1975, it was announced that a school would be built there, with an estimated cost of construction of $255,220. Evangelista Bros Pty Ltd was contracted to build the school. Construction started in August 1976, and the school opened in February 1977, named Kardinya Primary School. It was incomplete, with no windows, blackboards or chalk. There were 37 pre-primary students, 214 students in years 1 to 4, and eight teachers. A parents and citizens association was established on the first day of school. Among the decisions they made in the first year of operation was for the school colours to be yellow, green, and blue. They also held a competition to determine the school motto. The motto chosen was "Rise Above All", proposed by a local family. The school crest was also based on a design submitted by a local family.

After opening, work continued on the school, including on the construction of the library, car park, bicycle racks, paths, sporting facilities and gardens. Whilst sporting facilities were being constructed, the school used the adjacent Windelya Reserve (now known as Morris Buzacott Reserve) for sport. Demountable classrooms were brought in for periods, while construction on more permanent classrooms was ongoing. The school was officially opened on 15 August 1979, by Barry MacKinnon, the member for Murdoch. In 1980, there were 77 pre-primary students, and 426 students in years 1 to 7. That year saw the completion of all construction, and the graduation of the school's first Year Seven students. Enrolments peaked in 1982, at 491.

1984 saw the formation of a parent's consultative committee, a precursor to today's school councils which are common in Western Australia. A school council was later formed in 1987. It was one of the first in the state. Kardinya Primary School became an Independent Public School in 2017. With that came the replacement of the school council with a school board. As of 2021, there are 60 students in kindergarten, 54 students in pre-primary, and 235 students in years 1 to 6.

=== Secondary ===
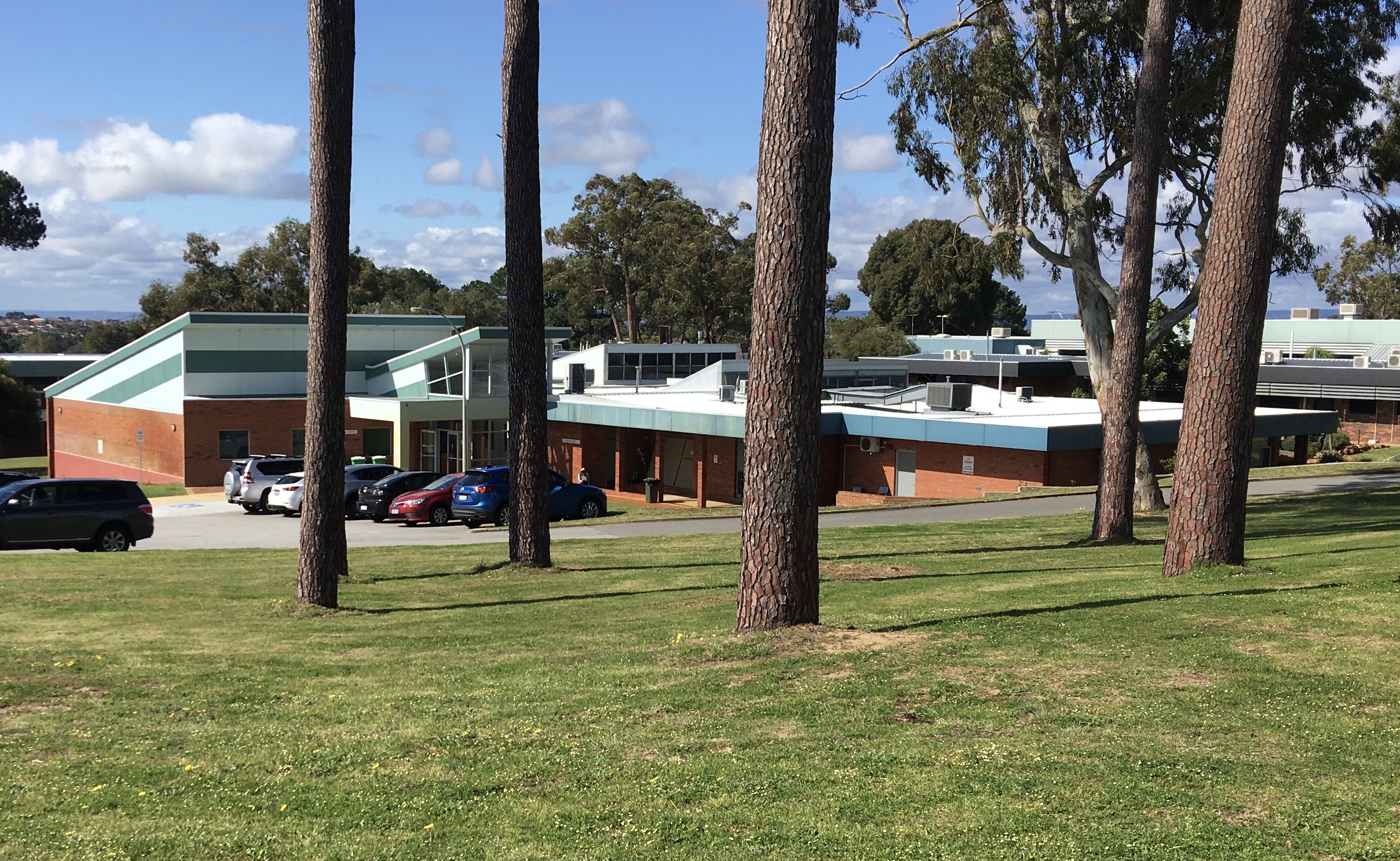
North Lake Senior Campus

Before there were any secondary schools in Kardinya, students attended various other schools, including Fremantle Boys' School, and Fremantle Girls' School. Students would cycle to Carrington Street and then catch a bus to Fremantle. Some students who attended Wesley College in South Perth would cycle along North Lake Road to Canning Highway, then catch a bus there. In 1960, Melville Senior High School was established. This was much closer to Kardinya, only a few kilometres north.

North Lake Senior High School opened in Kardinya on 4 February 1973 on its present campus at Winterfold Road (known then as Torquil Road). Before opening in Kardinya, the school operated for Year 8 students on the Melville Senior High School campus. It was initially going to be named Kardinya High School, but the name was changed before opening to show that its catchment covers the suburbs surrounding Kardinya as well. The school had 165 Year 8 and 9 students in 1973. Upon opening, the facilities constructed were an administration block, a science and mathematics block, a canteen, a gymnasium and a library. Construction continued after the opening. Further facilities opened in the years following 1973, and on 29 March 1979, the school was officially opened by the minister for education, Peter Jones.

Enrolments peaked at 935 in 1983, after which enrolments declined. By 1995, the school had fewer than 400 students, and so the Department of Education changed the school to serve Year 11 and 12 students only, a new concept for Western Australian public schools. Alongside this, the school was renamed to North Lake Senior Campus.

== Politics ==
=== Local ===
Kardinya is located in the City of Melville local government area. From January 1871, Kardinya was part of the Fremantle Road District (now known as the City of Cockburn). On 5 June 1901, the East Fremantle Road District was created, encompassing the modern-day City of Melville. It was soon renamed to the Melville Road District to avoid confusion with the neighbouring Municipality of East Fremantle (now known as the Town of East Fremantle) and to give the district its own identity. The Melville Road District became the Shire of Melville on 1 July 1961, following the enactment of the Local Government Act 1960. It became the Town of Melville on 26 September 1962 and the City of Melville on 3 May 1968.

The suburb lies within the City of Melville's Bateman–Kardinya–Murdoch ward. Elections are held on the third Saturday of October in every odd numbered year. Councillors are elected to four year terms, and half of all councillors are up for election each election. Councillors for the Bateman–Kardinya–Murdoch ward are Nicole Robins and Soo Hong.

=== State ===
As of the 2025 Western Australian state election, Kardinya is divided between the electoral districts of Bateman, Bibra Lake, and Bicton in the Western Australian Legislative Assembly. Bateman covers the parts north of South Street and east of North Lake Road, Bicton covers the parts north of South Street and west of North Lake Road, and Bibra Lake covers the parts south of South Street. All three districts are held by the Labor Party. The member for Bateman is Kim Giddens, the member for Bibra Lake is Sook Yee Lai, and the member for Bicton is Lisa O'Malley.

=== Federal ===
As of the 2025 Australian federal election, Kardinya is divided between the electoral divisions of Fremantle and Tangney in the Australian House of Representatives. Fremantle covers the areas south of South Street and west of North Lake Road, and Tangney covers the remainder of Kardinya. Both of these divisions are held by the Labor Party. The member for Fremantle is Josh Wilson and the member for Tangney is Sam Lim.

== Transport ==
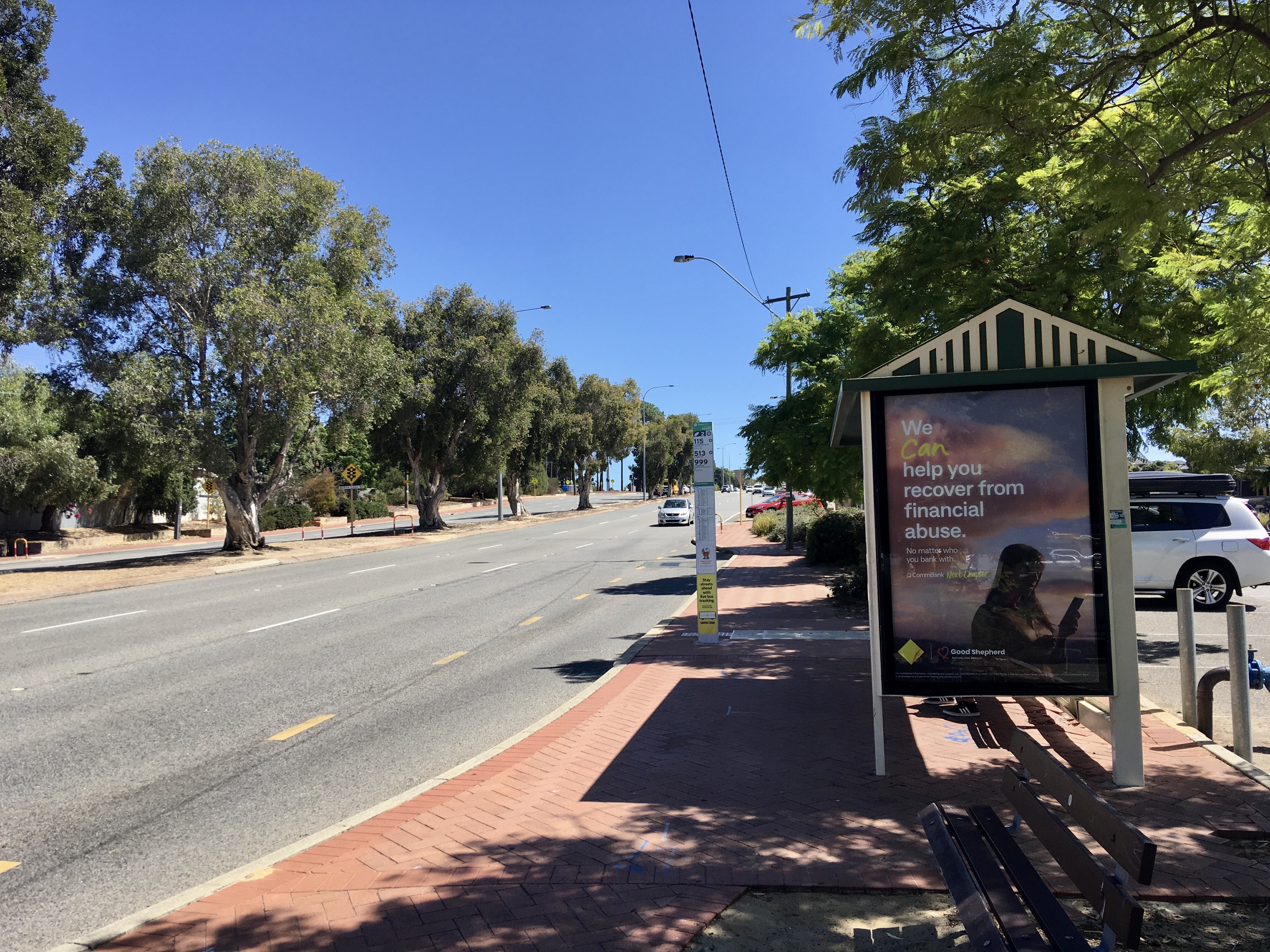
South Street in Kardinya with bus stop in foreground

At the 2016 census, 74.7% of residents travelled to work in a car, whereas 9.9% travelled to work on public transport.

=== Road ===
Kardinya is quadrisected by South Street, which runs east–west, and North Lake Road, which runs north–south. Both of these roads are six-lane dual carriageways. North Lake Road previously followed a different alignment through Kardinya, but it was realigned to its present position in 1975. The road along its former alignment is now known as Gilbertson Road. Heading east on South Street leads to Murdoch University, St John of God Murdoch Hospital, Fiona Stanley Hospital, Murdoch railway station, the Kwinana Freeway and Roe Highway. The Kwinana Freeway is the main road into the Perth CBD. The freeway can also be accessed by heading east on Farrington Road, which travels along Kardinya's southern boundary east of North Lake Road. Heading west on South Street leads to Fremantle and Stock Road, a major north–south route that leads to Rockingham. Heading north on North Lake Road leads to Leach Highway and Canning Highway. Heading south on North Lake Road leads to Cockburn Central and Armadale Road. Other arterial roads in Kardinya include Winterfold Road, which travels along the suburb's southern boundary west of North Lake Road, Garling Street, which travels along the suburb's northern boundary west of North Lake Road, and Somerville Boulevard, which travels along the suburb's boundary east of North Lake Road.

=== Public transport ===
Transperth bus services in Kardinya include routes 115, 503, 504, 511, 512, 513, 998 and 999. These routes, except for route 115, all connect to Murdoch railway station, the closest railway station to Kardinya at approximately 4 kilometres (2 mi) east. The station is in the median of the Kwinana Freeway, and is on the Mandurah railway line. Route 115 is a limited stop service that travels between Hamilton Hill and Elizabeth Quay bus station in the Perth CBD. It travels a roughly north–south route through Kardinya, through the centre of the suburb. Routes 503 and 504 travel between Murdoch railway station and Bull Creek railway station, on the Mandurah railway line. Route 503 travels along Gilbertson Road and South Street, and route 504 travels along Prescott Drive and South Street. Route 511 travels between Murdoch railway station and Fremantle railway station near the northern side of the suburb. Route 512 travels between Murdoch railway station and Spearwood along Farrington Road. Route 513 travels between Murdoch railway station and Fremantle railway station along South Street, North Lake Road and Winterfold Avenue.
