= Bull Creek, Western Australia =

Bull Creek
- Suburb
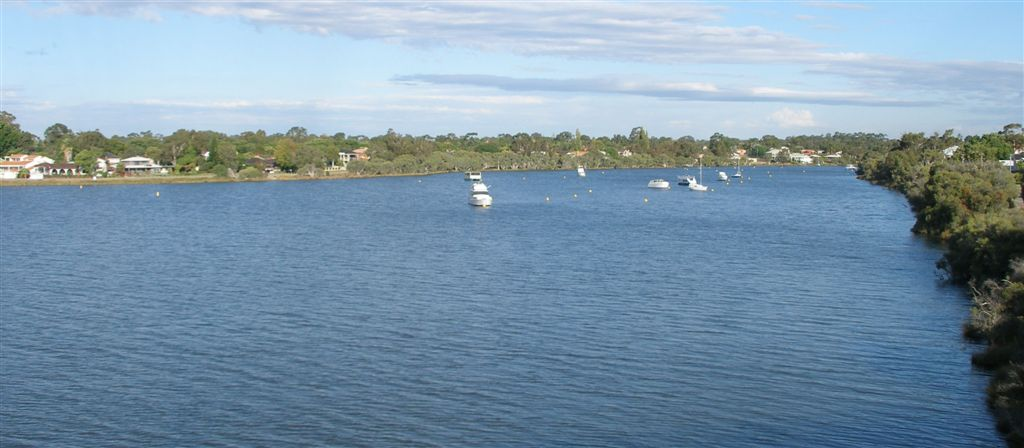
- Bull Creek
- Interactive map of Bull Creek
- Coordinates: 32°03′23″S 115°51′45″E
- Country: Australia
- State: Western Australia
- City: Perth
- LGA: City of Melville
- Established: 1968

Government
  - State electorate: Riverton
  - Federal division: Tangney

Population
  - Total: 8,030 (SAL 2021)
- Postcode: 6149
Suburbs around Bull Creek
Booragoon	Brentwood	Rossmoyne
Bateman	Bull Creek	Willetton
Murdoch	Leeming	Canning Vale

Bull Creek is a suburb of Perth, Western Australia, located within the local government area of City of Melville. The suburb lies to the south of a creek of the same name, which flows into the Canning River.

== History ==
Prior to European settlement, Bull Creek was inhabited by Aboriginal people from the Wadjuk Beeliar tribe. They used the wetlands as a summer source of food and fresh water. The area is significant to the Beeliar Aboriginal people and is referred to as Gabbiljee (transl. watery place at the end of the river).

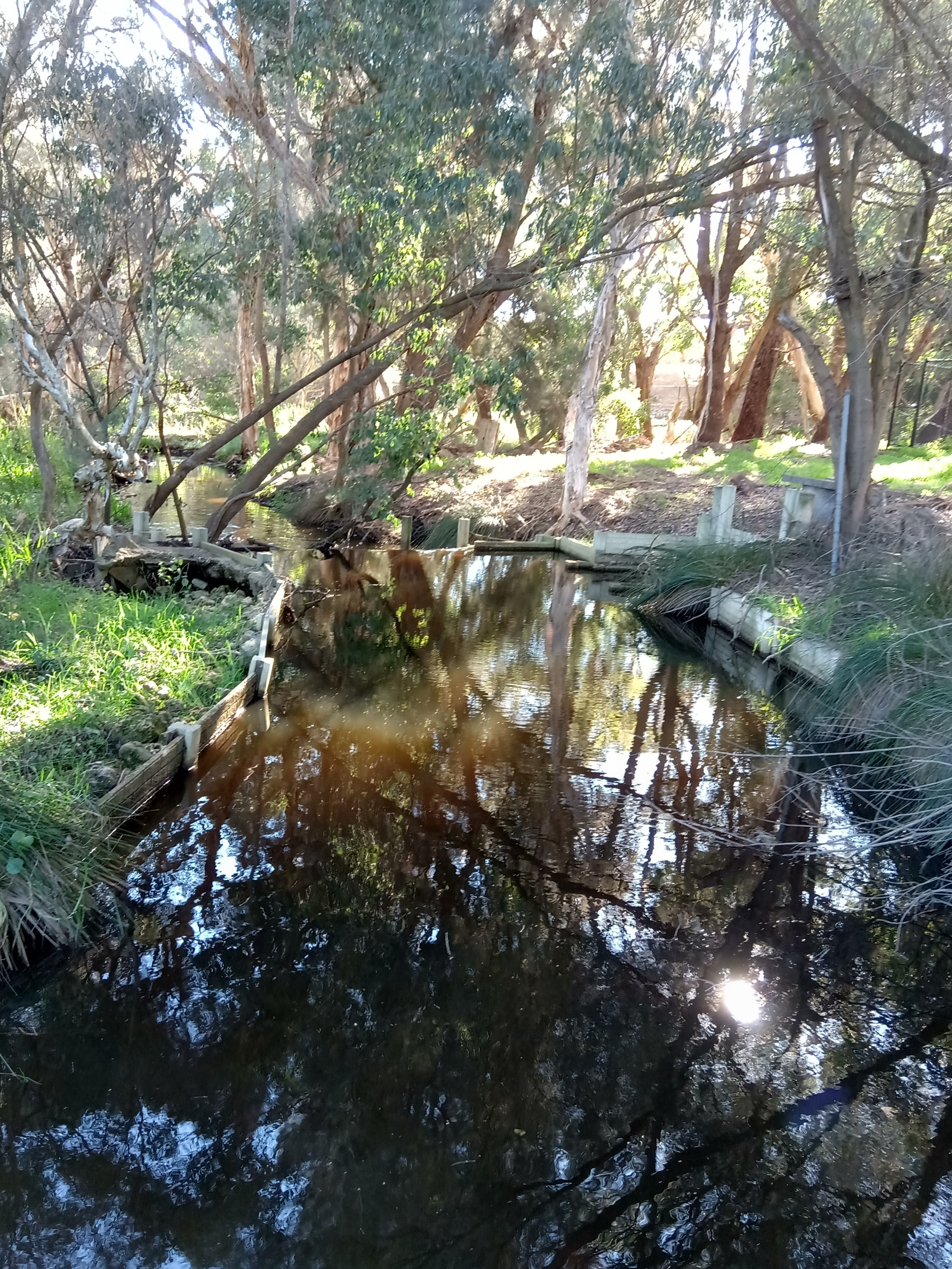
Source of Bull Creek, Western Australia

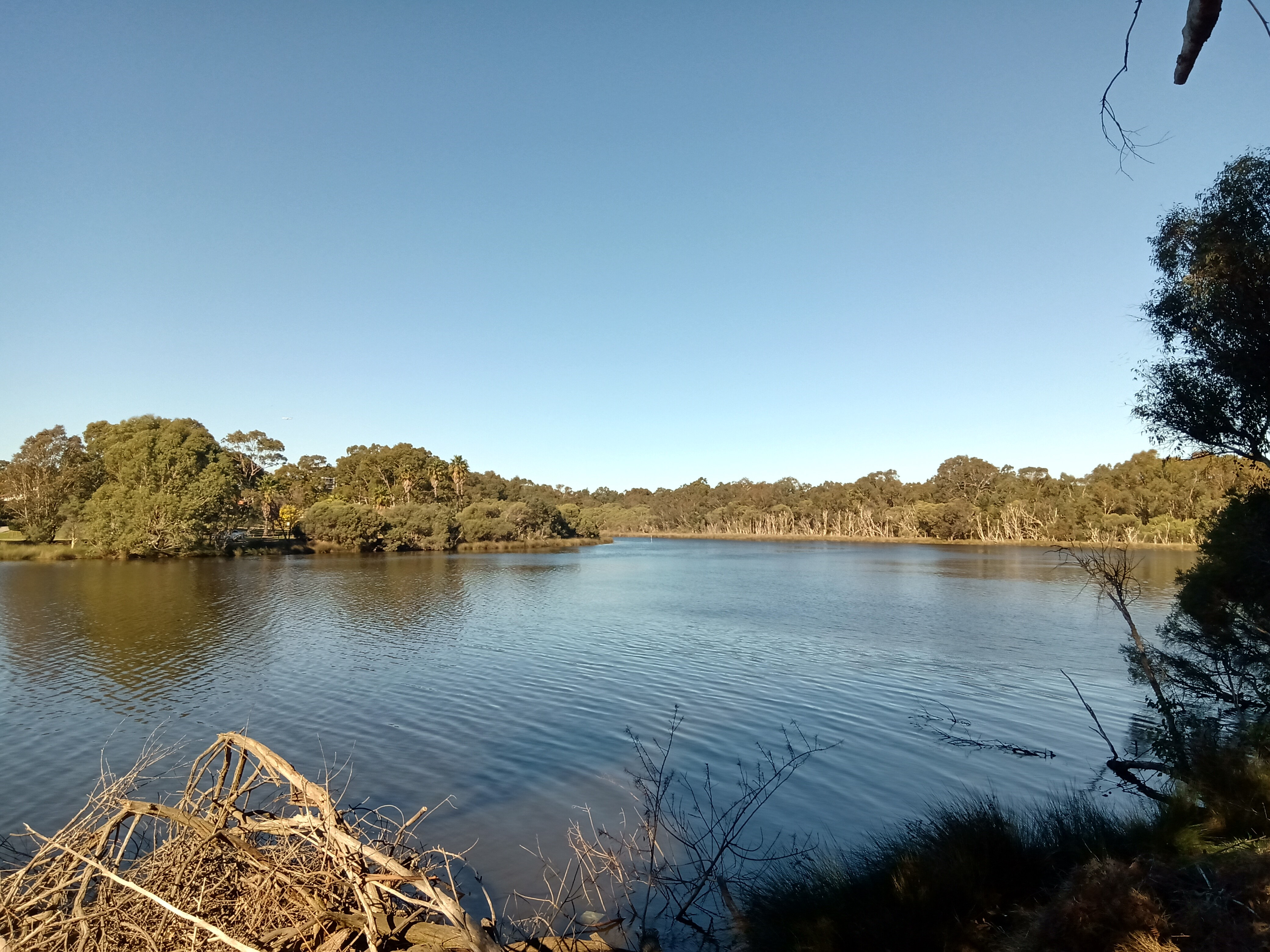
Bull Creek in the afternoon

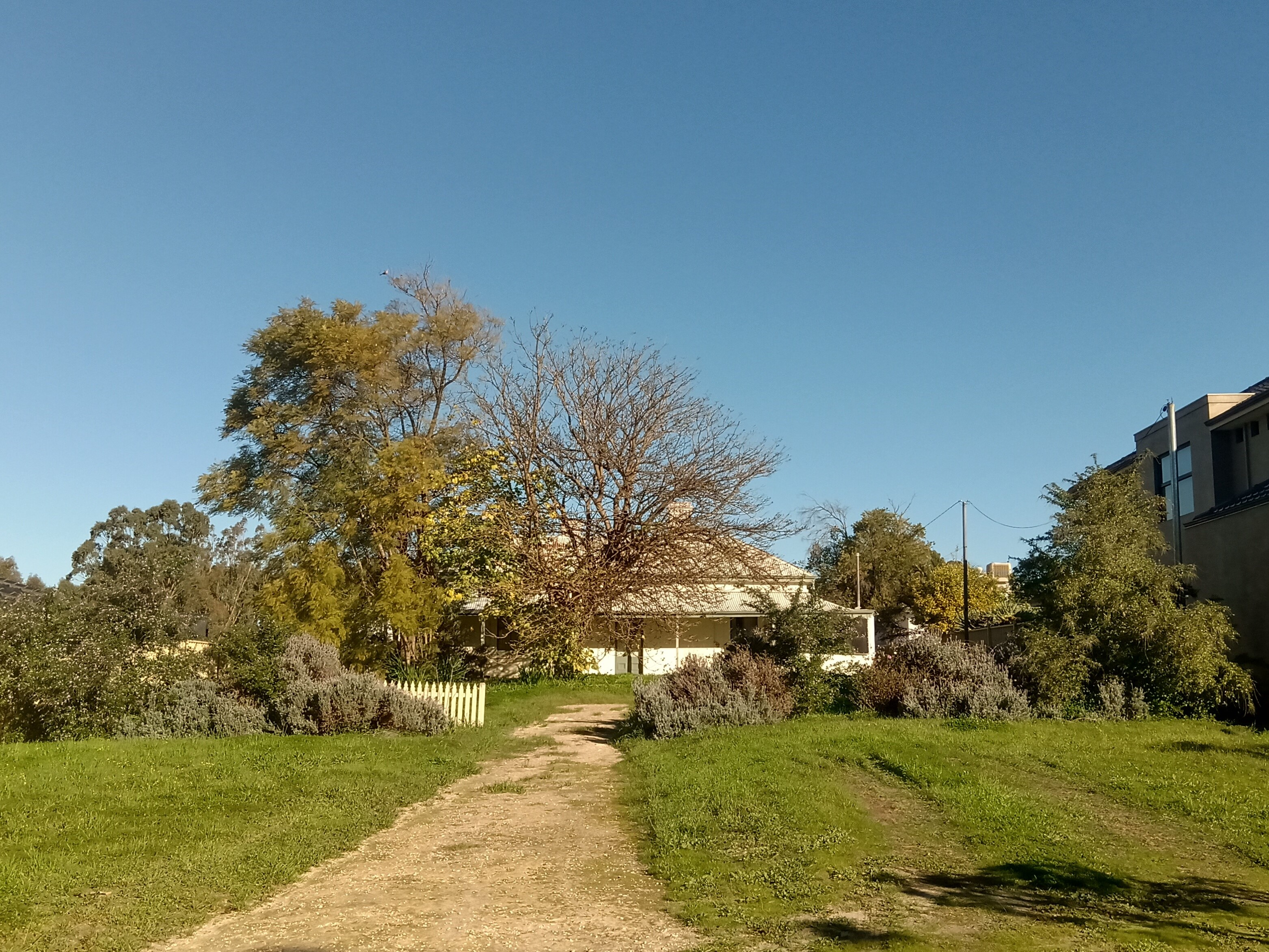
Grasemere Homestead, one of the oldest buildings in Western Australia

The name was adopted by the City of Melville Council in December 1968. The creek was named after an early settler, Henry Bull, to whom a grant of 120 hectares (300 acres) of nearby land was made in 1830. A larger grant of 520 hectares (1,280 acres) later in that year was made to Thomas Middleton; it is this land that today makes up the largest part of the suburb. The name, Bull Creek is also often, but incorrectly, written as the single word Bullcreek.

== Education ==
Bull Creek is served by both government and private schools. The suburb has two state primary schools, Bull Creek Primary and Oberthur Primary. All Saints' College is a private school situated on the northern side of the suburb. Bull Creek is served by three state government high schools; Rossmoyne Senior High School takes students residing north of Parry Avenue, Leeming Senior High School takes students from south of Parry Avenue. Students living south of Parry Avenue and east of Wheatley Drive (both sides) can also choose to go to Willetton Senior High School. There are also a number of private schools in the nearby suburbs of Bateman, Murdoch and Winthrop. Bull Creek is 2 kilometres (1.2 mi) from Murdoch University.

== Transport ==
Bull Creek railway station is situated in the Kwinana Freeway median strip at Leach Highway, the inter-suburban Mandurah railway line running perpendicular to Leach Highway. The station features integrated bus services on the concourse level; this level operates as a bus station. The station officially opened on 23 December 2007 and services both the Perth CBD and the neighbouring city of Mandurah.

=== Bus ===
- 178 and 179 Bull Creek Station to Elizabeth Quay Bus Station – serve Leach Highway
- 506 Bull Creek Station to Parkwood – serves Bull Creek Drive and Parry Avenue
- 507 Bull Creek Station to Cannington Station – serves Bull Creek Drive and Parry Avenue
- 201 Bull Creek Station to Cannington Station – serves Leach Highway and Karel Avenue
- 509 Bull Creek Station to Cannington Station – serves Leach Highway
- 998 Fremantle Station to Fremantle Station (limited stops) – CircleRoute Clockwise, serves Karel Avenue and South Street
- 999 Fremantle Station to Fremantle Station (limited stops) – CircleRoute Anti-Clockwise, serves South Street and Karel Avenue

Bus routes serving Bull Creek Station only:

- 500 Bull Creek Station to Booragoon Bus Station
- 502 Bull Creek Station to Fremantle Station
- 503, 504 and 505 Bull Creek Station to Murdoch Station
- 915 Bull Creek Station to Fremantle Station (high frequency)

Bus routes serving South Street:

- 204 and 205 Murdoch University to Maddington Station
- 206 Murdoch University to Cannington Station
- 207 Murdoch University to Thornlie Station
- 208 Murdoch Station to Cannington Station
- 515 Murdoch Station to Jandakot
- 516 Murdoch Station to Southlands Boulevarde Shopping Centre
- 517 Murdoch TAFE to Thornlie Station
- 518 Murdoch TAFE to Cockburn Central Station
- 519 Murdoch TAFE to Armadale Station

=== Rail ===
- Mandurah Line
  - Bull Creek Station

== Facilities ==
On the southern side of Bull Creek on South Street, is the Stockland Bull Creek shopping centre. It has a wide range of shops including a supermarket, a large discount department store, large liquor store and bar as well as about 50 smaller speciality shops. There are also a number of fast food restaurants and banks in its vicinity. A smaller shopping area is also located in Parry Avenue and comprises an independent supermarket (open 7 days a week), chemist, newsagency, a number of small eateries and real estate agents.

The Aviation Heritage Museum is located on Bull Creek Drive. It is operated by the RAAF Association of Western Australia.

== Parkland ==
Bull Creek has numerous parks, including John Creaney Park. The reserve is named after a manager of Hooker and Rex Estates, who established the park when subdividing.
