= Lakeland Senior High School (Western Australia) =

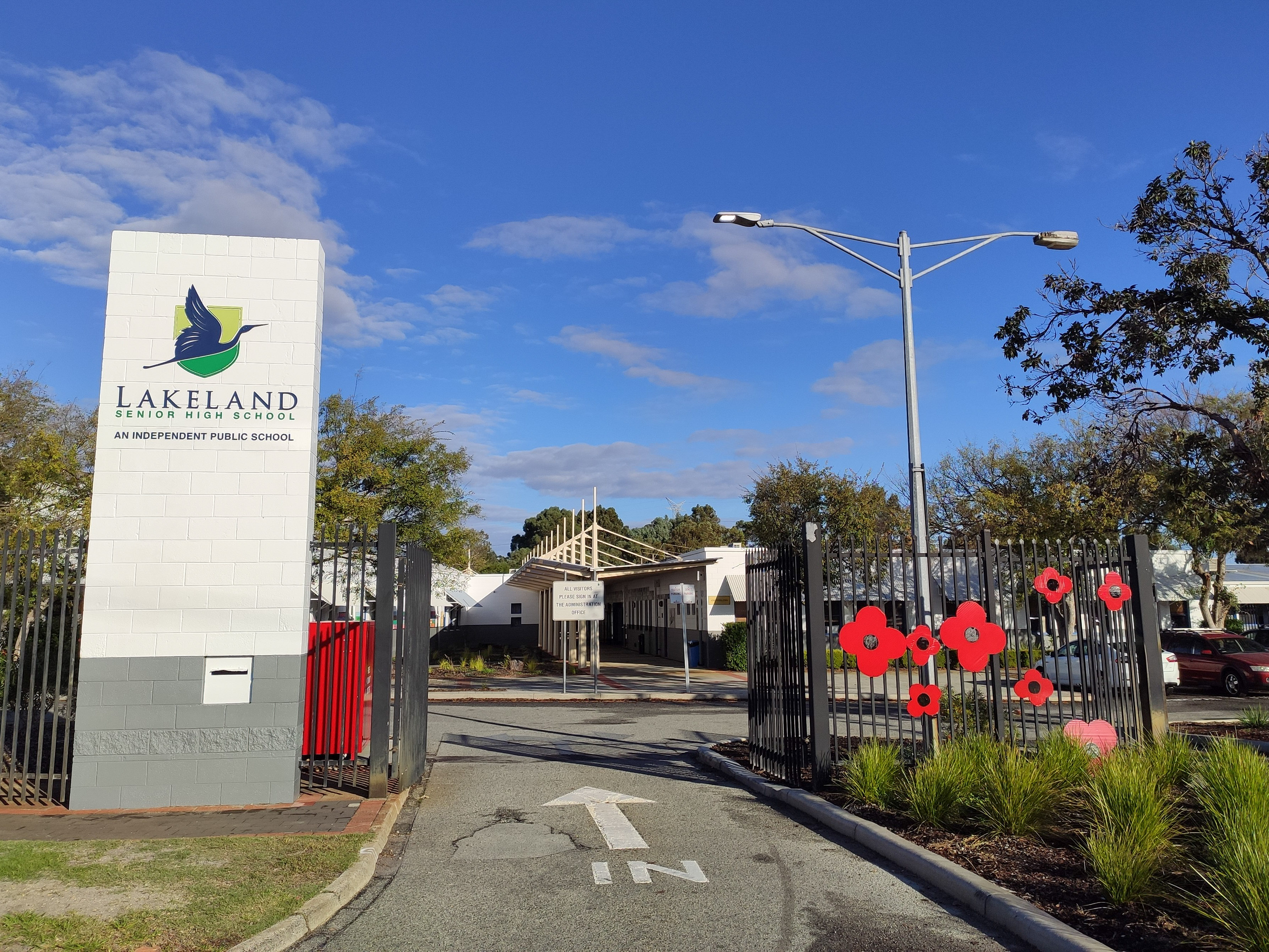
- Main entrance of the school

Location
- 106 South Lake Drive, South Lake, Perth, Western Australia; Australia; 32°06′30″S 115°50′44″E

Information
- Type: Independent public co-educational high day school
- Motto: Strive to achieve
- Established: 1990; 36 years ago
- Educational authority: WA Department of Education
- Principal: Catherine Baron
- Years: 7–12
- Enrolment: 607 (2020)
- Campus: Suburban
- Colours: Green and black
- Website: lakelandshs.wa.edu.au

Lakeland Senior High School (abbreviated as LSHS) is an independent public co-educational high day school, located in the Perth suburb of South Lake, Western Australia.

== History ==
The school was established in 1990 and caters to students from Year 7 to Year 12.

Enrolment at the school has increased over the past years. The school had 659 students in 2007 prior to rezoning four primary schools to Atwell College. Enrolments were 618 in 2008, 591 in 2009, 478 in 2010, 405 in 2011, 450 in 2012, 480 in 2013, 523 in 2014, and 750 in 2015.

The school was given Independent Public School status by the Minister of Education, Liz Constable, in 2011.

== Catchment area ==
Lakeland's catchment area has been specified by the WA Department of Education to include all or parts of the suburbs of Beeliar, Bibra Lake, Jandakot, South Lake and Yangebup. Lakeland's feeder primary schools are Atwell, Beeliar, Bibra Lake, Jandakot, South Lake and Yangebup.

Its neighbour high schools are Leeming Senior High School to the north, Hamilton Senior High School to the northwest, Atwell College to the south, and Southern River College to the east.

== Notable alumni ==
- Elizabeth Parnov – athlete, represented Australia at the 2012 Olympics
- Vicky Parnov – pole vaulter, represented Australia at the 2006 Commonwealth Games
- Taylor Worth – archer, represented Australia at the 2010 Commonwealth Games

== See also ==
- List of schools in the Perth metropolitan area
