= Murdoch, Western Australia =

Murdoch
- Suburb
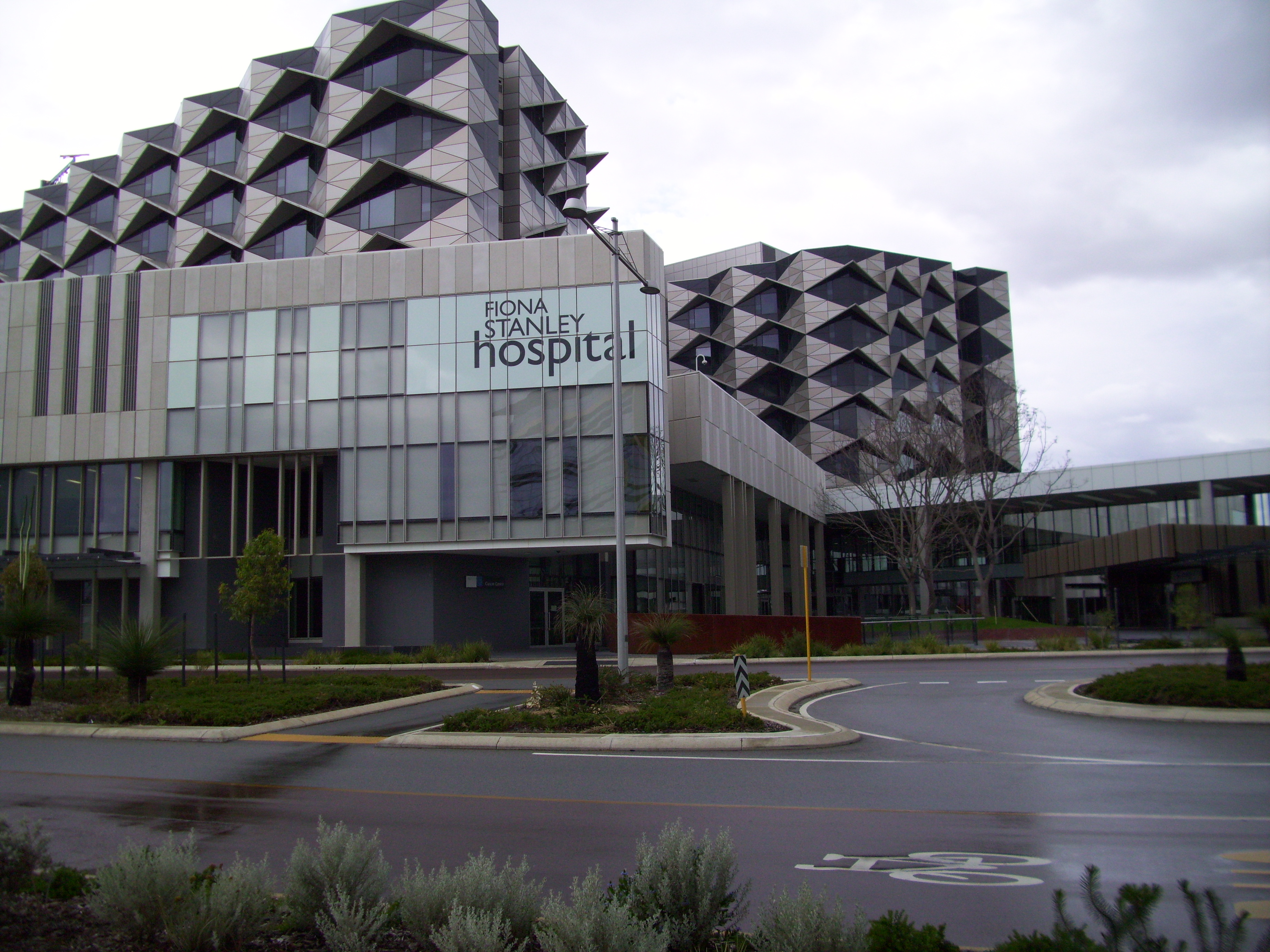
- Fiona Stanley Hospital
- Interactive map of Murdoch
- Coordinates: 32°04′12″S 115°50′15″E
- Country: Australia
- State: Western Australia
- City: Perth, Western Australia
- LGA: City of Melville
- Location: 12 km (7.5 mi) from Perth
- Established: 1974

Government
  - State electorate: Bateman, Bibra Lake
  - Federal division: Tangney

Population
  - Total: 3,352 (SAL 2021)
- Postcode: 6150
Suburbs around Murdoch
Kardinya	Winthrop	Bateman
Kardinya	Murdoch	Leeming
Coolbellup	North Lake	Jandakot

Murdoch is a suburb of Perth, Western Australia, located within the City of Melville. Murdoch University, St John of God Hospital Murdoch and Fiona Stanley Hospital are located in Murdoch. The suburb is named after Sir Walter Murdoch.

== Location ==
Murdoch is located next to Winthrop, Bateman, Kardinya and North Lake. Boundaries with these suburbs are delineated by Somerville Drive, Murdoch Drive, Prescott Drive and Farrington Road respectively.

== Land use ==
Murdoch's residential area is primarily on the northern side of South Street; the area on the southern side is primarily for commercial usage. While hospitals and educational institutions dominate the suburb's land usage, the area also includes a police station, a fire station, and the minimum-security Wandoo Rehabilitation Prison.

=== Hospitals ===
There are two major hospital complexes within Murdoch: the privately owned St John of God Hospital and the Government-operated Fiona Stanley Hospital that opened in October 2014.

=== Education ===
Tertiary education institutions Murdoch University and a campus of the South Metropolitan TAFE are located in Murdoch. Kennedy Baptist College caters for students from year 7 to 12. There are no primary schools within the suburb.

== Transport ==
=== Bus ===
- 115 Elizabeth Quay Bus Station to Hamilton Hill Memorial Hall – serves Somerville Boulevard
- 503 Murdoch Station to Bull Creek Station – serves South Street
- 504 Murdoch Station to Bull Creek Station – serves South Street, Prescott Drive and Somerville Boulevard
- 505 Murdoch Station to Bull Creek Station – serves South Street and Murdoch Drive
- 510 Murdoch Station to Booragoon Bus Station – serves Barry Marshall Parade and Murdoch Drive
- 511 Murdoch Station to Fremantle Station – serves Barry Marshall Parade, Murdoch Drive and Somerville Boulevard
- 512 Murdoch Station to Fremantle Station – serves Barry Marshall Parade, Murdoch Drive and Farrington Road
- 513 Murdoch Station to Fremantle Station – serves South Street
- 514 Murdoch Station to Cockburn Central Station – serves Barry Marshall Parade, Murdoch Drive and Farrington Road
- 998 Fremantle Station to Fremantle Station (limited stops) – CircleRoute Clockwise, serves Murdoch Station, Barry Marshall Parade and Discovery Way
- 999 Fremantle Station to Fremantle Station (limited stops) – CircleRoute Anti-Clockwise, serves South Street, Discovery Way, Barry Marshall Parade and Murdoch Station

Bus routes serving Discovery Way, Barry Marshall Parade and Murdoch Station:

- 204 and 205 Murdoch University to Maddington Station
- 206 Murdoch University to Cannington Station
- 207 Murdoch University to Thornlie Station

Bus routes serving Jennalup Street, Fiona Wood Road and Murdoch Station:

- 517 Murdoch TAFE to Thornlie Station
- 518 Murdoch TAFE to Cockburn Central Station
- 519 Murdoch TAFE to Armadale Station

Bus routes serving Murdoch Station only:

- 208 Murdoch Station to Cannington Station
- 515 Murdoch Station to Jandakot
- 516 Murdoch Station to Southlands Boulevard Shopping Centre

=== Rail ===
- Mandurah Line
  - Murdoch Station

== Churches ==
There are several churches based in the suburb of Murdoch, including Evangel Christian Fellowship; an evangelical church based in Murdoch University since 1991.
