= Coolbellup, Western Australia =

Coolbellup
- Suburb
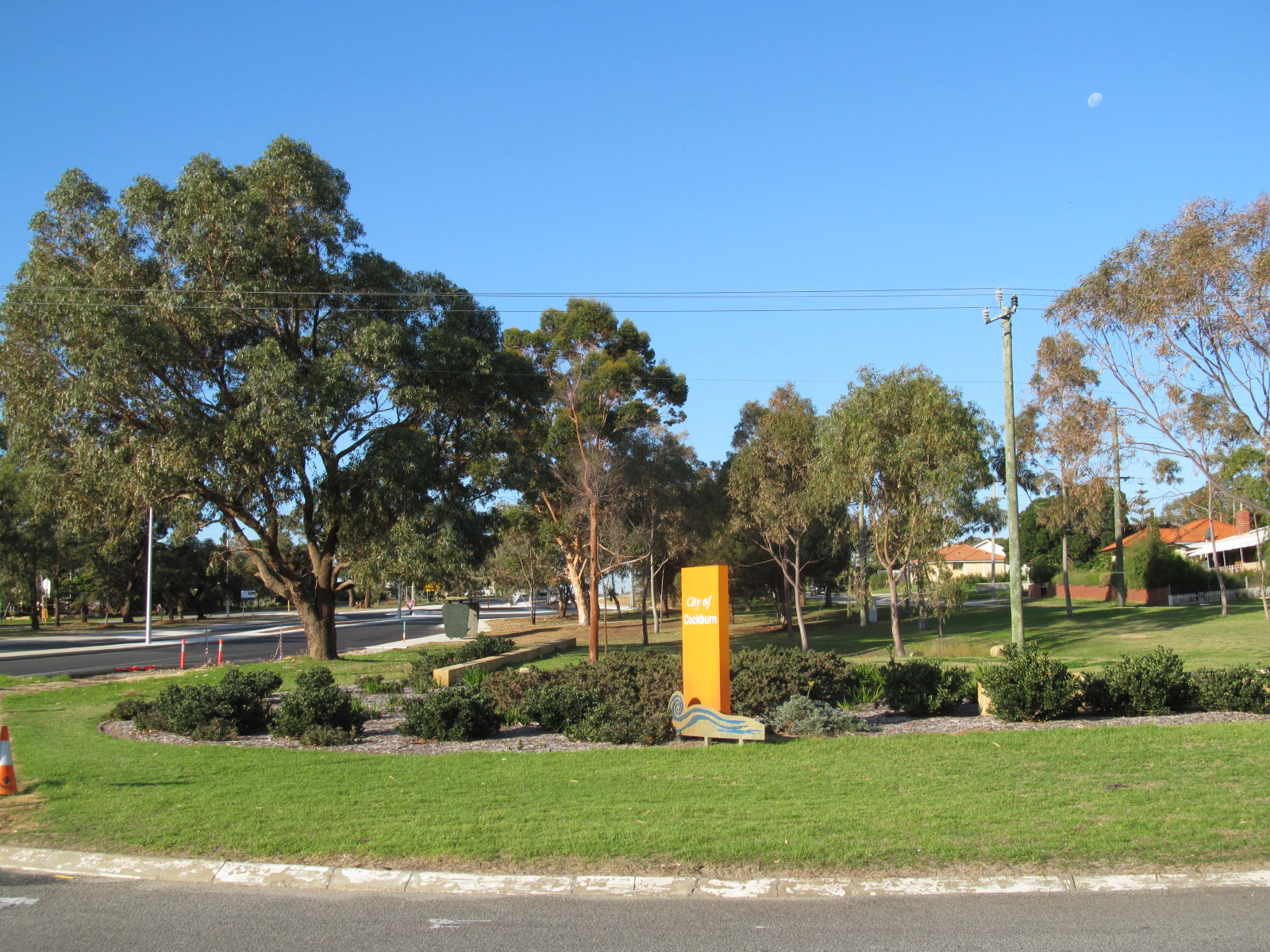
- City of Cockburn sign at Stock Road, Coolbellup.
- Interactive map of Coolbellup
- Coordinates: 32°04′52″S 115°48′22″E
- Country: Australia
- State: Western Australia
- City: Perth
- LGA: City of Cockburn
- Location: 15 km (9.3 mi) from Perth

Government
  - State electorate: Bibra Lake
  - Federal division: Fremantle

Area
  - Total: 3.1 km^{2} (1.2 sq mi)

Population
  - Total: 5,698 (SAL 2021)
- Postcode: 6163
Suburbs around Coolbellup
Hilton	Samson	Kardinya
Hamilton Hill	Coolbellup	North Lake
Spearwood	Bibra Lake	Bibra Lake

Coolbellup is a suburb in Perth, Western Australia, located 15 kilometres (9.3 mi) south of the central business district within the local government area of the City of Cockburn.

Coolbellup takes its name from the Aboriginal name for the nearby North Lake, which the area was known as until 1957.

== History ==
The original inhabitants were the Noongar people from the Swan River, who made their campsites along Perth's central lakes to avoid the salty lakes closer to the coast. Sixteen Aboriginal campsites have been found in the City of Cockburn.

Coolbellup was originally the eastern portion of George Robb's Cockburn Sound Location 10. The name Coolbellup was recorded as the Aboriginal name of a lake near the eastern boundary of the grant in 1842 by Augustus Gregory. Surveys by RM King in 1877 showed the local name to be North Lake and both names were shown on plans. The lake is the northernmost of the chain of lakes lying between Mandurah and the Swan River. Early landholders in the area were G. Jarvis, Joseph Meller and the Dixon family.

In the 1920s most of the area was taken up with dairy farms; however, a cattle-borne disease destroyed the dairy industry in the area. An abattoir operated in the area up until the 1950s. A vineyard also operated in the area and remained in production until it was cleared for housing in the late 1970s for what is now known as the suburb of North Lake. Large portions of native bushland remained and native wildlife flourished in the area with a large population of kangaroos. In 1954 most of the land was resumed by the State Housing Commission and an intensive post-war housing scheme developed for the area. In 1957 it was decided that the suburb should be called Coolbellup in preference to North Lake.

During the 1960s the area's population grew quickly with families moving into modern brick houses on large blocks provided at low cost loans by the state government. A number of flats were also constructed in the area. The Coolbellup Shopping Centre was established in the middle of the suburb, with the adjacent Coolbellup Motor Hotel. The hotel was demolished in 2014.

By the late 1980s Coolbellup's post-war population boom was over and gradually the demographics changed from young families with children to older residents. The suburb's appearance was also in need for revitalisation.

During the late 1990s a suburb revitalisation project began. This included demolition of flats and replacement with higher quality dwellings. Some flats have also been converted to high quality apartments. Roads, parks and sporting grounds have also been improved.

These changes, together with the suburb's location and Perth real estate trends, have resulted in a significant increase in property values in the area. Most public housing has now been sold off to private owners. The houses in the area are typified as 1960s 3-bedroom-1-bathroom brick and tile cottages with solid timber floors on 700 m^{2} (0.17-acre) blocks. These houses are once again proving popular with younger couples and families seeking character homes within 15 kilometres (9.3 mi) of the CBD.

== Geography ==
Coolbellup is bounded by Winterfold Road (named after the Winterfold Estate, which was the home of the Healy family) to the north, Stock Road (originally part of a stock route from Robb Jetty to Midland Junction) to the west, North Lake Road to the east, and Forrest Road (named after John Forrest, then the Surveyor General of Western Australia) and the Roe Highway reservation to the south. The main streets within Coolbellup are Coolbellup Avenue, Counsel Road, Cordelia Avenue, Hargreaves Road, Antigonus Street and Waverley Road.

The natural features of the area include gentle undulating land with the highest points in the Coolbellup Avenue Waverley Road area.

The only water features are lakes located at North and Bibra Lake, although these are no longer in the Coolbellup locality.

== Facilities ==
=== Recreation and community ===
There are a number of parks with Coolbellup. The main park, Len Packham Reserve, located on Waverley Road to the rear of the Coolbellup Shopping Centre is used for little league soccer training and the park also has basketball courts and a skatepark. Also adjacent to the shops, on Cordelia Avenue is the Coolbellup library. The other main park is Tempest Reserve on Coolbellup Avenue, home of the Coolbellup Australian Football Club.

=== Education ===
There were three state government primary schools in the area: Coolbellup (now consolidated into Coolbellup Community School); East Coolbellup (renamed North Lake Primary School, later consolidated into Coolbellup Community School); and South Coolbellup (renamed Koorilla Primary School, later consolidated into Coolbellup Community School). They were closed due to declining numbers of young families and children in the suburb and replaced by a single new school, Coolbellup Community School on the Len Packham Reserve. The former school sites have since been redeveloped for housing by Landcorp. A high school, North Lake Senior High School, was constructed on Winterfold Road in 1973 in what was then a pine plantation. The site was later rezoned as Somerville and later Kardinya. It closed as a high school in 1993 and is now an adult education school, North Lake Senior Campus.

=== Religious ===
There are two churches in Coolbellup, a Baptist Church and a Uniting Church, both on Waverley Road.

== Transport ==
=== Bus ===
- 115 Hamilton Hill Memorial Hall to Elizabeth Quay Bus Station – serves Counsel Road, Waverley Road and North Lake Road
- 511 Fremantle Station to Murdoch Station – serves Winterfold Road
- 512 Fremantle Station to Murdoch Station – serves Coolbellup Avenue, Cordelia Avenue, Romeo Road and Waverley Road
- 513 Fremantle Station to Murdoch Station – serves Counsel Road, Leece Street, Cordelia Avenue, Coolbellup Avenue and Winterfold Road
- 520 Fremantle Station to Cockburn Central Station – serves Forrest Road
