= Leeming, Western Australia =

Leeming Perth, Western Australia
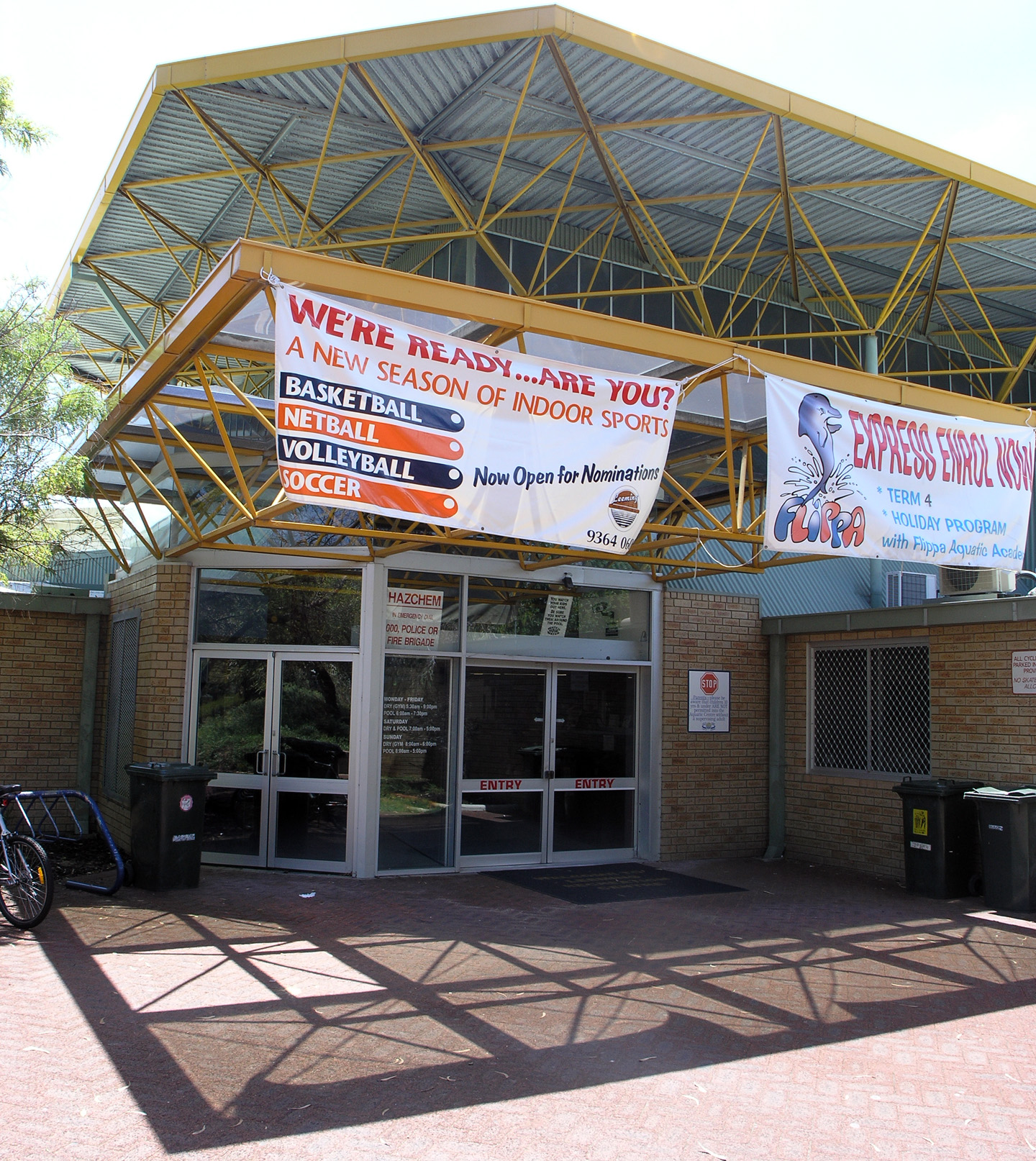
- Leeming recreation centre entrance
- Coordinates: 32°04′33″S 115°52′02″E
- Population: 10,883 (SAL 2021)
- Postcode(s): 6149
- Area: 7.5 km^{2} (2.9 sq mi)
- Location: 17 km (11 mi) from Perth
- LGA(s): City of Melville; City of Cockburn; City of Canning
- State electorate(s): Jandakot, Riverton
- Federal division(s): Tangney
Suburbs around Leeming:
Bateman	Bull Creek	Willetton
Murdoch	Leeming	Canning Vale
Bibra Lake	Jandakot	Canning Vale

Leeming is a southern suburb of Perth, Western Australia. It is divided between the three local government areas of the City of Melville, the City of Cockburn (south) and the City of Canning (north-east). It is located approximately 17 kilometres (11 mi) south of the Perth central business district and 13 kilometres (8.1 mi) east of Fremantle.

== History ==
The area was previously part of Jandakot and was predominantly agricultural until the 1970s, having been laid out by surveyor George Waters Leeming (1857–1902) in 1886. Three roads – King Road, Leeming Road (the southern boundary) and Beasley Road – accessed the area. In 1971, the suburb of Leeming was gazetted, although construction did not commence until approximately 1976, possibly as early as 1975. It was built in stages, with the area between Findlay Road and Gracechurch Crescent being built first, while the east, west and south were built in that order over the next ten years. Many of the streets were named after original landowners in the agricultural district.

== Geography ==
Leeming is bounded by South Street to the north, Kwinana Freeway to the west, and Roe Highway to the south and southeast. The 53-hectare (130-acre) Ken Hurst Park, a conservation bushland area beyond Roe Highway named for a former mayor of Melville (1971–73) and set aside in the early 1990s, is also within the suburb's boundaries.

At the 2001 Australian census, Leeming had a mostly upper-middle income population of 12,977 people living in 3,959 dwellings, all but 230 of which were detached houses on separate lots. About 10% of the population are of East or South-East Asian descent. Retail and property and business services are the two most common occupations.

== Facilities ==
=== Educational ===
Leeming contains three primary schools; Leeming (established in 1982), West Leeming (1986) and Banksia Park (1989), and one high school, Leeming Senior High School (1985). Leeming Senior High School has an education support centre.

=== Commercial ===
Leeming has two shopping centres:

- Leeming Shopping Forum, on the corner of Farrington and Findlay Roads, which contains a variety of small shops, an IGA supermarket, and restaurants
- Leeming Park Shopping Centre, on the corner of Beasley Road and Dundee Street

Nearby commercial services are provided by Stockland in Bull Creek on its northern fringe, and Southlands Boulevarde in Willetton.

=== Recreation and community ===
The suburb contains a family centre, a recreation centre and sports facilities called the Rec, the Leeming Spartan Cricket Club, the Leeming Bowling Club and the Melville Glades Golf Club.

Murdoch University, Murdoch TAFE (a campus of South Metropolitan TAFE), St John of God Murdoch Hospital and Fiona Stanley Hospital are 2 kilometres (1.2 mi) to the west.

=== Transport ===
The suburb is located next to Murdoch train station, which opened in 2007. All services are operated by the Public Transport Authority.

- 515 Jandakot to Murdoch Station – serves Aulberry Pde, Farrington Rd & Karel Ave
- 516 Jandakot to Murdoch Station – serves Findlay Rd, Farrington Rd, Casserly Drive

Jandakot Airport is 2 kilometres (1.2 mi) to the south-east.

== Politics ==
Leeming is a reasonably affluent suburb with a mix in support of the major political parties.

== Pictures ==
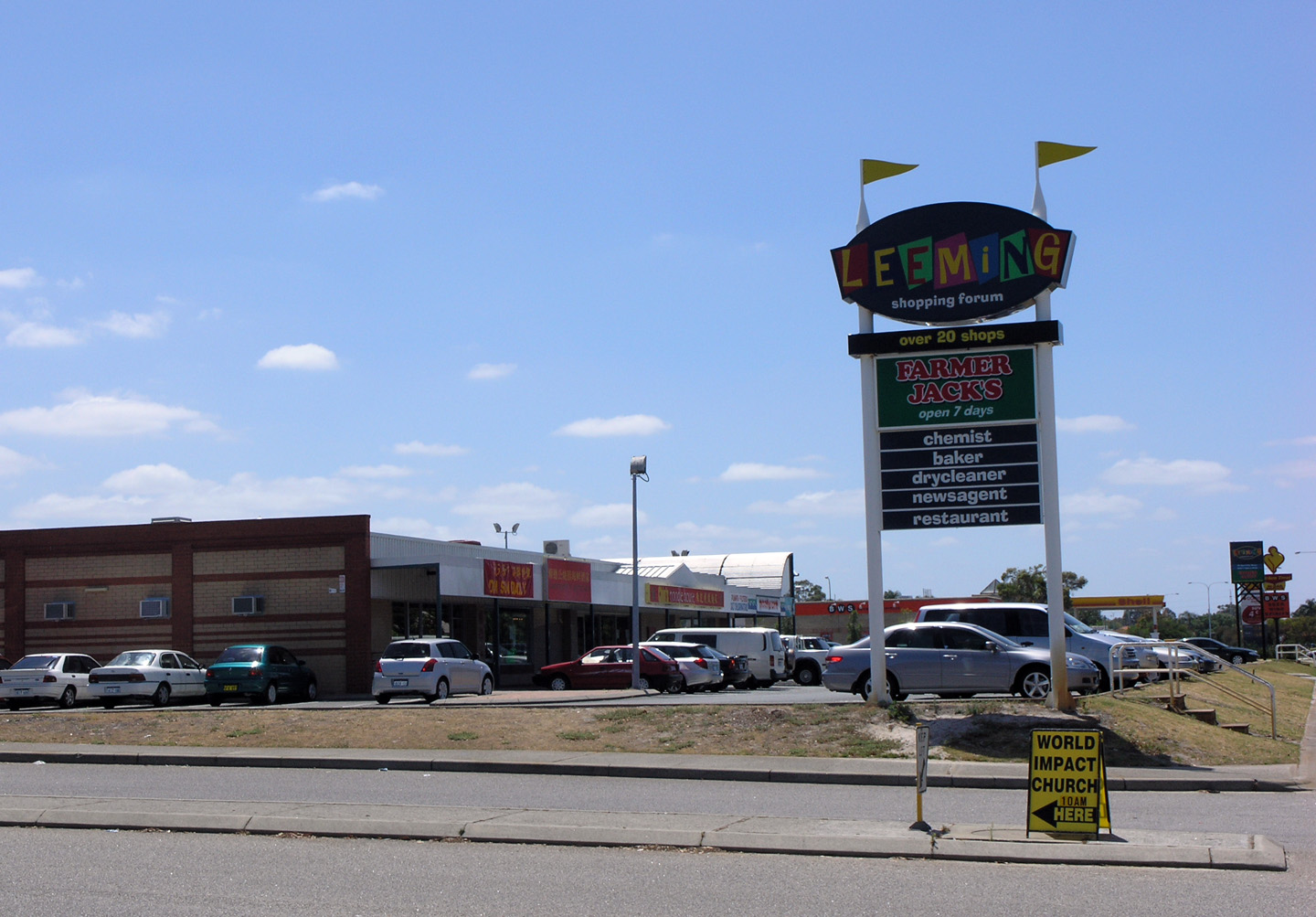
Leeming Shopping Forum on Farrington Road

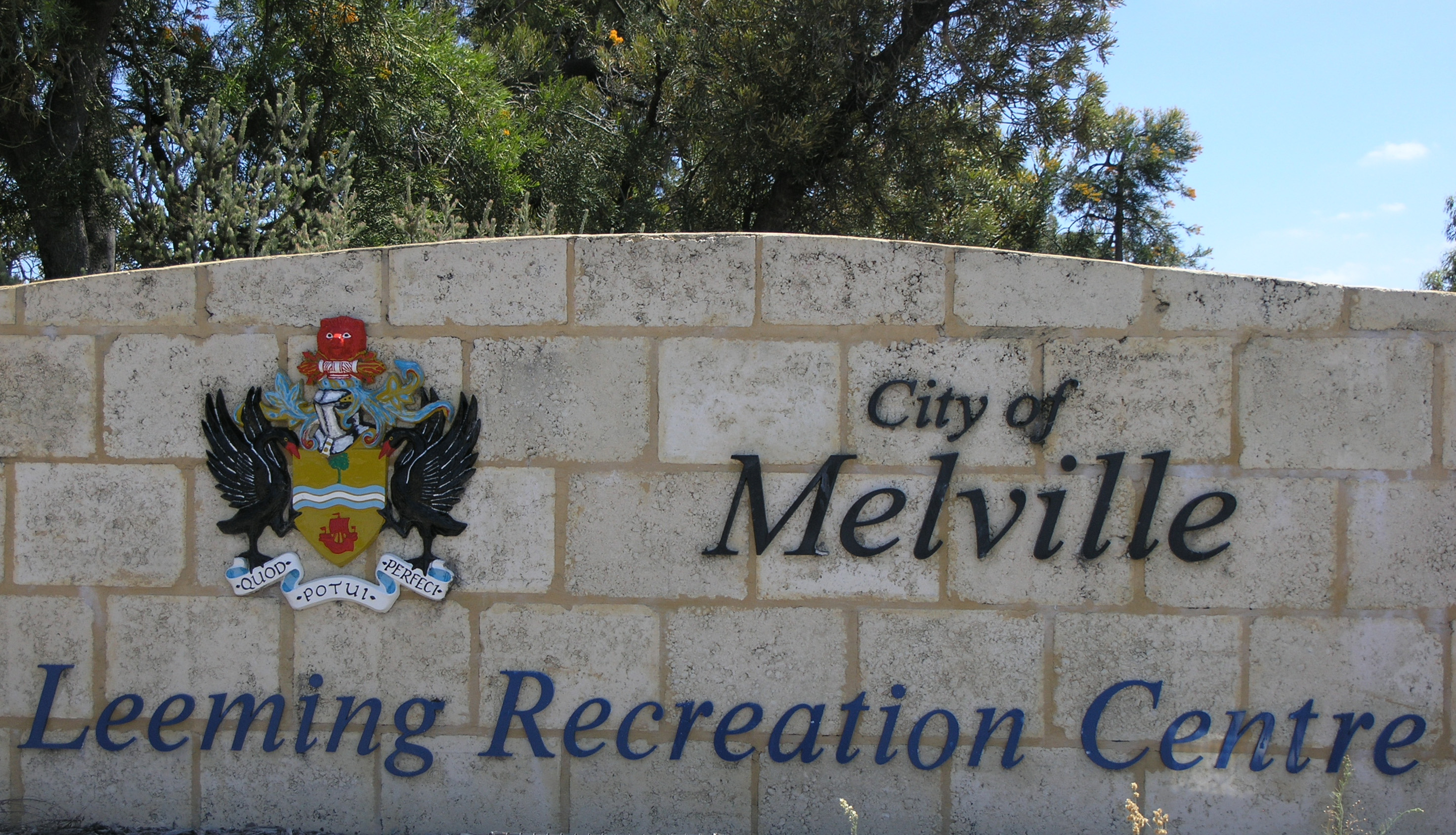
Leeming Recreation Centre sign on Farrington Road

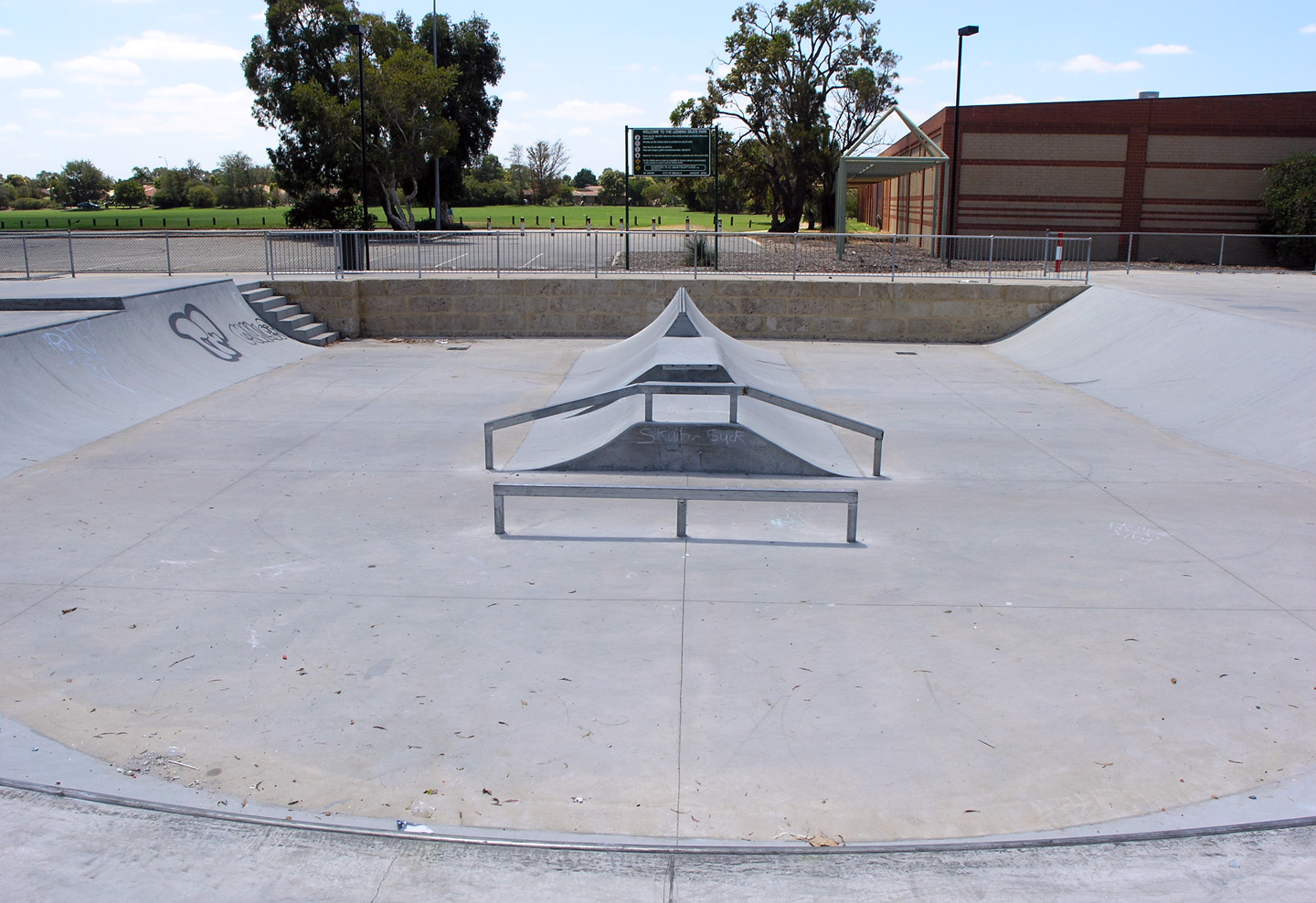
Leeming skate park in 2006. Since 2007, the park has been repainted with street art, under a plan known as "Phaze" organised by the local council.
