= All Saints' College, Perth =

All Saints' College

Location
- Bull Creek, Perth, Western Australia; Australia; 32°03′07″S 115°51′58″E

Information
- Type: Independent co-educational early learning, primary, and secondary day school
- Motto: To serve with wisdom and courage
- Denomination: Anglicanism
- Established: 1981; 45 years ago
- Educational authority: WA Department of Education
- Oversight: Independent
- Chair: Gary Mack
- Principal: Nick Jones
- Teaching staff: 126.1 FTE (2025)
- Employees: 91.4 FTE (2025)
- Grades: Early learning; K–12
- Enrolment: 1,374 (2025) (2025)
- Area: 19 hectares (47 acres)
- Campus type: Suburban
- Colours: Navy blue, light blue and white
- Website: www.allsaints.wa.edu.au

All Saints' College is an independent Anglican co-educational early learning, primary, and secondary day school, located in Bull Creek, a southern suburb of Perth, Western Australia. The college is situated on 19 hectares (47 acres), approximately ten kilometres (six miles) south of the Perth central business district.

The college was founded in 1981 as the first coeducational Anglican secondary school in the Perth metropolitan area and the first Anglican secondary school in the southern suburbs, and now caters for students from kindergarten to Year 12/13. (Note: The Western Australian education system normally finishes at Year 12. All Saints' College allows students to take the Year 12 courses over two calendar years, which are referred to as Years 12 and 13.)

== History ==
Planning for the college began in 1979, and the first enrolment was accepted in that year. Construction began in 1980 and the first classes were held in 1981. Initially the college had approximately 100 students, in years 7 and 8.

The chapel was built in 1989, and the junior school in 1992. The swimming pool and learning centre were added in 2001. A student gathering area named The Common was installed in 2008.

In late 2009, the college adopted a new logo.

A new indoor sports centre was completed in August 2010. During 2010, the senior school library was expanded, re-opening at the start of the 2011 academic year.

A new performing arts theatre was built in 2012, and opened in 2013.

== Junior school ==
The junior school facilities include music rooms, an art complex, a library, computing facilities, an enrichment centre and a theatre.

== Senior school ==
Year 7 and 8 students take part in a transition programme that helps them to make the transition to senior school. Year 11 students are given training for a mentoring role in a peer support programme that has been operating for several years.

The year 12/13 learning centre was the first of its kind in Australia. The three-storey building comprises classrooms, laboratories and student amenities. Every room has air-conditioning, television and video and is online, with both wireless and wired network technology. The ground floor features an independent learning area with study carrels and computers, a quiet study room and a student common room.

== Houses ==
The college has a pastoral house system with six houses, named after Western Australian historical figures. The houses are:

- Cowan – named after Edith Cowan
- Durack – named after the Durack family (Patrick Durack, Michael Durack, Mary Durack, Elizabeth Durack) (Note: "Durack House is named after the Durack family who pioneered the Kimberley region of this state. … The family included Mary Durack (1913–1994) … and Elizabeth Durack (1915–2000) ...")
- Forrest – named after John Forrest
- Murdoch – named after Walter Murdoch
- O'Connor – named after C. Y. O'Connor
- Stirling – named after James Stirling

Forrest, Murdoch, O'Connor and Stirling were established with the college in 1981. Cowan and Durack were added in 1994 as the student numbers increased.

Between 1993 and 2011, the junior school had separate houses: Bussell, Drummond, Molloy and Riley. (Note: The junior school houses were named after Grace Bussell, James Drummond, Georgiana Molloy and Charles Owen Leaver Riley.) In 2012, these houses were disbanded and the students transferred to the same houses as the senior school.

== Notable alumni ==
The Former Students' Association is a group of former students established in 1986. Its goals are to create a sense of community among former students, and to further the interests of the college. The Association has its own publication, Dovetails.

- Chisela Kanchela – a former Zambian swimmer
- Brian Tee – a former Victorian politician
- Deborah Tsai – an Australian synchronised swimmer
- Michael Usher – an Australian presenter and reporter
- Scott Watters – a former Australian rules football player and coach
- Josephine Langford – actress

== See also ==
- List of schools in the Perth metropolitan area
- Anglican education in Australia
