= North Lake Senior Campus =

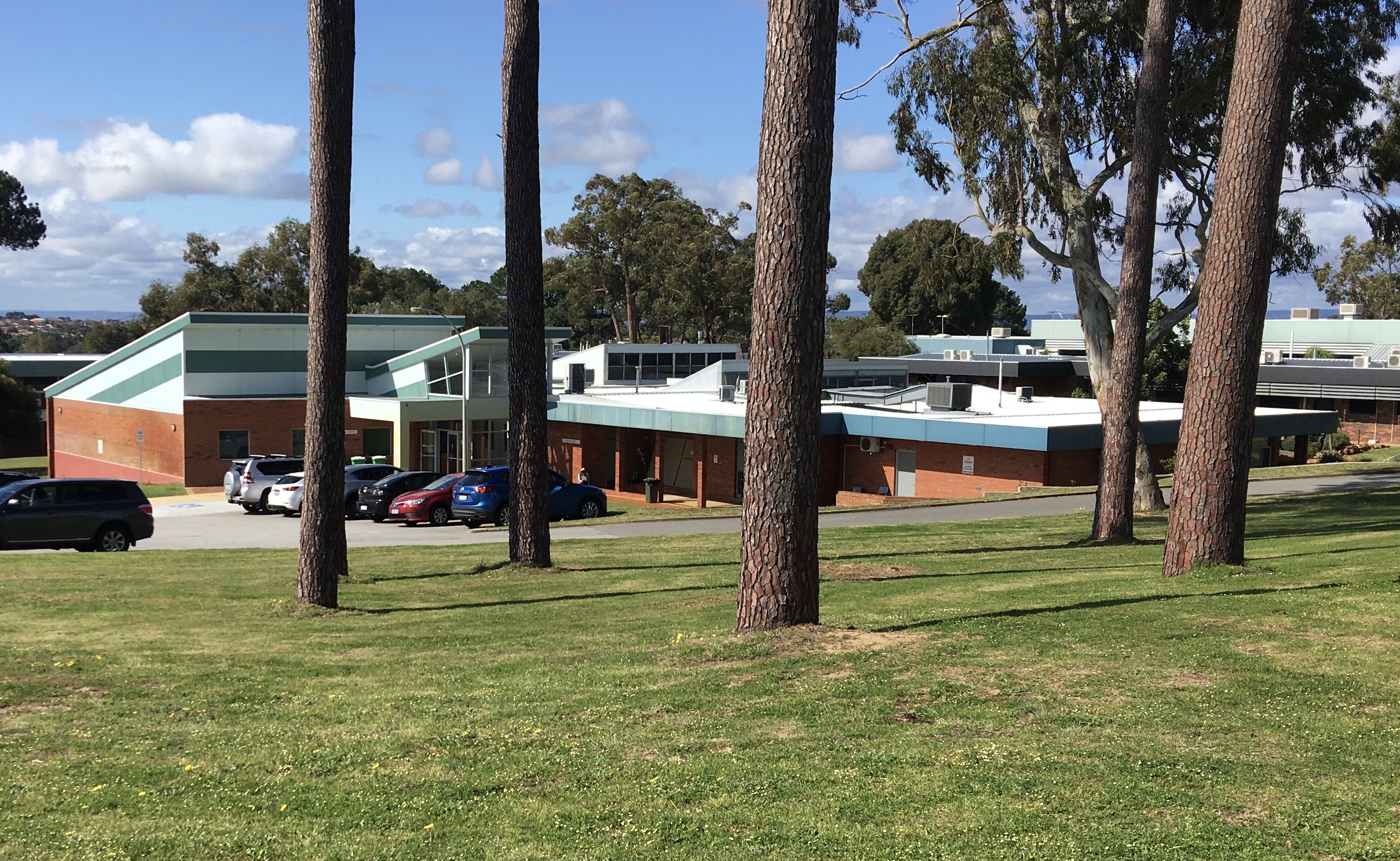

Location
- Kardinya, Perth, Western Australia; Australia; 32°04′25″S 115°48′49″E

Information
- Type: Public co-educational high day school
- Motto: Path to the Future
- Established: 1973; 53 years ago
- Educational authority: WA Department of Education
- Principal: Gary Anderson
- Enrolment: 309 (2013)
- Campus type: Suburban
- Website: www.northlake.wa.edu.au

North Lake Senior Campus is a public co-educational high day school, located in Kardinya, a suburb of Perth, Western Australia.

== History ==
North Lake Senior High School opened in Kardinya on 4 February 1973 on its present campus at Winterfold Road (known then as Torquil Road). Before opening in Kardinya, the school operated for Year 8 students on the Melville Senior High School campus. It was initially going to be named Kardinya High School, but the name was changed before opening to show that its catchment covers the suburbs surrounding Kardinya as well. The school had 165 Year 8 and 9 students in 1973. Upon opening, the facilities constructed were an administration block, a science and mathematics block, a canteen, a gymnasium and a library. Construction continued after opening. Further facilities opened in the years following 1973, and on 29 March 1979, the school was officially opened by the Minister for Education, Peter Jones.

In 1983, enrolments peaked at 935. After that, enrolments gradually declined. By 1995, the school had fewer than 400 students, and so the Department of Education changed the school to serve Year 11 and 12 students only, a new concept for Western Australian public schools. Alongside this, the school was renamed to North Lake Senior Campus.

== Overview ==
The primary focus of the campus is the education of post-compulsory aged students who want to complete year 11 or 12, while also offering various vocational education courses, a Fast Track program, and Open Learning programs. The campus also caters to international students via its Intensive English program. The campus is most notably home to a 25-metre (82 ft) swimming pool and its own FM band radio station, 87.8FM.

Student enrolments have declined over the past five years but is starting to regain numbers once again from 367 in 2007 to 432 in 2008, 403 in 2009, 348 in 2010, 296 in 2011, 300 in 2012, 309 in 2013 and 339 in 2014.

== Fast Track ==
Fast Track is a North Lake Senior Campus program aiming to allow post-compulsory aged persons to complete year 10. It is situated in the Princess May building in Fremantle, Western Australia. It offers subjects such as English (Certificates in General Education for Adults 1, 2 and 3), Maths (CGEA 1 and 2) and the year 11 subject Structured Workplace Learning. Upon completion of the course, students are given easy access into North Lake Senior Campus by means of a liaison officer.

== Principals ==
Name	Years	Ref
Bernie Withers	1973–1974	
Frank Eggleston	1975–1979	
Vic Terren	1980–1986	
Des Crock	1987–1989	
Neville Murphy	1990–2001	
Alan Genoni	2002–2007	
Mary Margetts	2007–2020	
Gary Anderson	2020–present	

== See also ==
- List of schools in the Perth metropolitan area
