= Kennedy Baptist College =

Coordinates: 32.0740°S 115.8301°E

- Farrington Rd, Bibra Lake, Western Australia

Information
- Former names: Winthrop Baptist College, Somerville Baptist College
- Motto: Conquer today, Strive tomorrow
- Denomination: Baptist
- Established: 2013
- Chair: Nina Tassell
- Headmaster: Mark Ashby
- Chaplain: Peter Chase
- Teaching staff: 160
- Enrollment: 1,238
- Colors: Dark blue, light blue, white
- Website: www.kennedy.wa.edu.a

Kennedy Baptist College is an Australian coeducational, independent, Baptist, secondary school located in Murdoch, Western Australia. The college currently educates 1,238 students and 160 staff members (2023). It is named after Baptist minister and pioneer William Kennedy and is situated on the grounds of Murdoch University.

== Overview ==
Kennedy Baptist College is headed by a board that appoints the headmaster. The current headmaster, Mark Ashby, was appointed for the opening of the school in 2013. He was the foundation principal of Mandurah Baptist College in 2005.

== History ==
Kennedy Baptist College was established in 2013 following the amalgamation of two neighbouring schools, Winthrop Baptist College and Somerville Baptist College, founded in 1994 and 1999 respectively.

The name of the school was chosen to honour the legacy of William Kennedy, a pastor and pioneer in the Baptist Union movement within Western Australia.

In March 2017, the school opened a new $3.6 million sport centre. The school received financial support for the project from the Capital Grants Program and a low interest loan from the Government of Western Australia. The sporting complex is able to be configured to suit multiple basketball, netball, volleyball or badminton courts. It also includes a fitness gymnasium and change and shower facilities.

In October 2022, the school opened a new state of the art technologies centre. It includes a STEM Studio, Computer Graphics and Design (CAD) Studio and a Wood and Metal Fabrication Workshop. The project was jointly funded by the Western Australian Government under the low interest loan scheme and Kennedy Baptist College. The project was the final stage of the school's master plan which began in 2013.

The College Board has ratified the Master Plan - 2021 and the future which will include the redevelopment of the Auditorium, the building of additional classes and offices and the development of a 250-seat lecture theatre.

In 2023, the college celebrated its 10 Year Anniversary since establishment.

== Academic ranking ==
Western Australian Certificate of Education / ATAR results
Year	Rank	Median ATAR
2013	72	N/A
2014	68	N/A
2015	57	N/A
2016	41	82.25
2017	67	76.60
2018	46	82.85
2019	21	86.20
2020	12	88.95
2021	33	84.75
2022	-	83.15

== Notable alumni ==
- Samantha Kerr
- Aron Attiwell
