= St John of God Murdoch Hospital =

Hospital in Perth, Western Australia

- St John of God Health Care
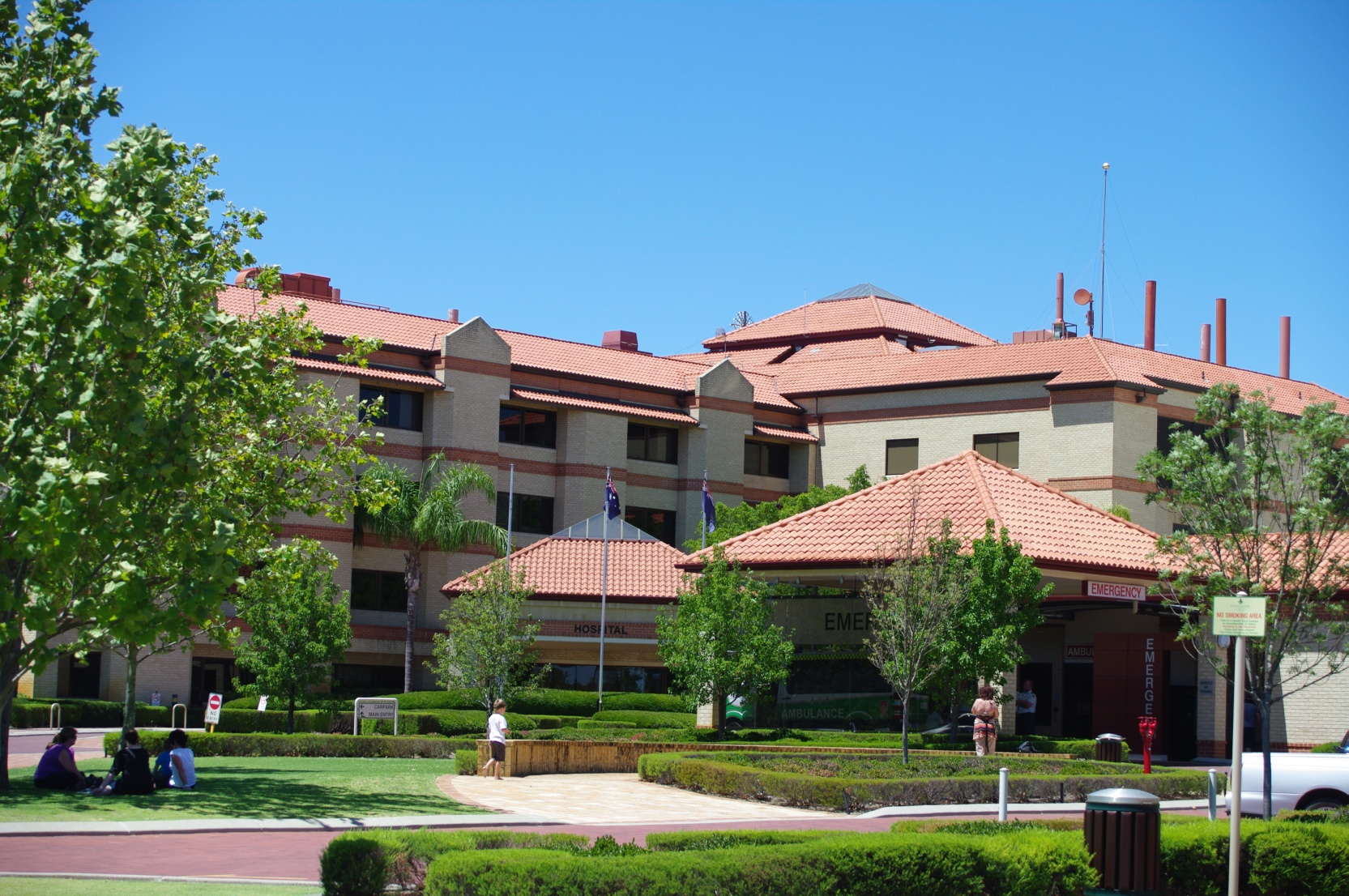
- Front entrance to emergency department of St John of God Murdoch Hospital, Murdoch
- St John of God Murdoch Hospital is located in Murdoch, Western Australia immediately adjacent to the Fiona Stanley Hospital campus, between Murdoch University and the Kwinana Freeway.

Geography
- Location: Murdoch, City of Melville, Western Australia, Australia
- Coordinates: 32°04′05″S 115°50′41″E

Organisation
- Care system: Private
- Type: General
- Religious affiliation: Catholic church
- Affiliated university: The University of Western Australia, Challenger Institute of Technology, Edith Cowan University, University of Notre Dame Australia

Services
- Emergency department: Yes
- Beds: 511

History
- Founded: 1994; 32 years ago

Links
- Website: www.sjog.org.au/our-locations/st-john-of-god-murdoch-hospital
- Lists: Hospitals in Australia

St John of God Murdoch Hospital is a 511-bed private non-profit hospital located in the southern suburbs of Perth in Western Australia, immediately adjacent to the public Fiona Stanley Hospital campus. The distance between the entrances to the emergency departments of these two hospitals is approximately 390 m (427 yd).

Established in 1994, the hospital services the southern suburbs of Perth. It provides comprehensive hospital services for more than 50,000 patients each year, with the emergency department.

St John of God Murdoch Hospital is a division of St John of God Health Care.

== Facilities ==
St John of God Murdoch Hospital has 511 inpatient beds, an emergency department, 16 operating theatres, five endoscopy suites, two angiography suites, birth suite, maternity ward, hydrotherapy pool, medical library and education centre.

== Services ==
Services provided by St John of God Murdoch Hospital include the following:

- Emergency Department open 8am - 10pm seven days a week
- medical and surgical services
- paediatrics
- maternity
- palliative care
- critical and coronary care
- cancer treatment

== St John of God Murdoch Community Hospice ==
Located on the grounds of St John of God Murdoch Hospital, the purpose-built, 20-bed Murdoch Community Hospice provides specialist palliative care to patients in Perth's southern suburbs. Funding for the A$5 million Murdoch Community Hospice was raised by the St John of God Foundation.

== Education ==
St John of God Murdoch Hospital has affiliations with a number of teaching institutions, including The University of Western Australia, Challenger Institute of Technology, Edith Cowan University and the University of Notre Dame Australia.

== Redevelopment ==
In 2014, the hospital finished the first stage of a A$200+ million redevelopment project, which included adding 174 beds, eight new theatres, a cancer centre including 20-place chemotherapy unit, multi-storey medical centre, 30-place endoscopy unit, pathology laboratory, birthing suite and 450 new parking bays.

Stage two of the redevelopment included a new Chapel and refurbished main entrance and foyer. The hospital's north wing wards are also being refurbished.

== Social outreach ==
St John of God Raphael Services in Fremantle and Cockburn provides perinatal infant mental health care and undertakes research. Staffed by mental health clinicians, Raphael Services provide free support for parents and families affected by anxiety, depression and other mental health difficulties during pregnancy and in the postnatal period. The services also provide counselling and support for parents undergoing prenatal testing or who have experienced pregnancy loss.

St John of God Health Care also delivers community mental health support in Murdoch through its Social Outreach services.

Murdoch Community Mental Health provides specialised care to the local community and offers holistic, professional and compassionate care tailored to individual needs.

== See also ==
- List of hospitals in Australia
- List of hospitals in New Zealand
