= List of Noongar sites in the City of Melville =

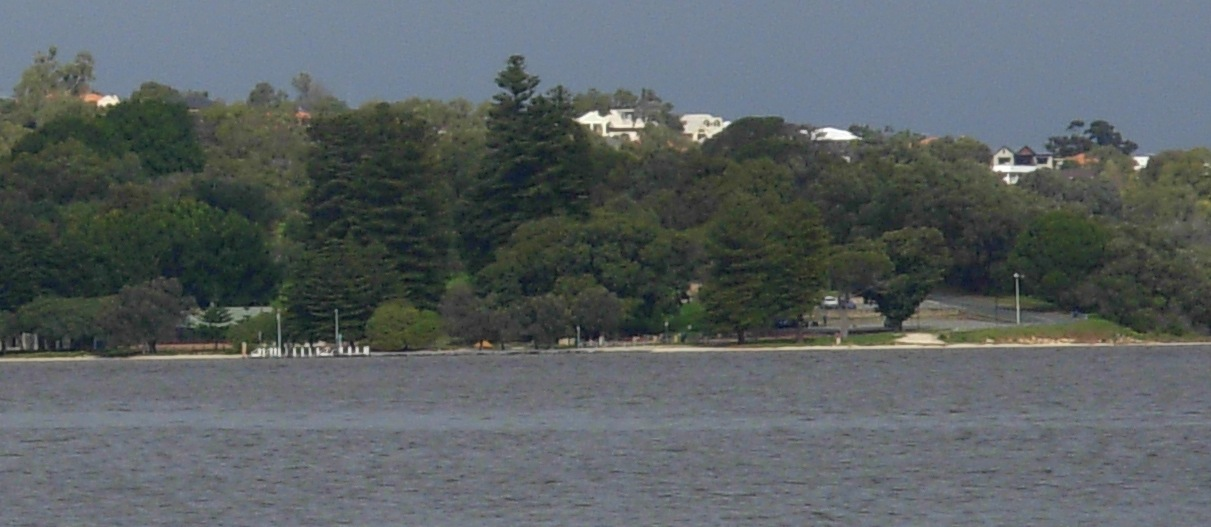
Point Walter from Claremont

The City of Melville local government area lies within the traditional lands of the Beeliar people, a subgroup of the Whadjuk dialectical group of the Noongar Indigenous Australians. These are several significant Noongar sites within the City of Melville.

Noongar name	European name	Notes
Willagee	Willagee	Source of red ochre.
Marradungup	Atwell Gallery site, Alfred Cove	The place where the hands are connected to the water. Meeting place and camping ground, including for local and visiting groups.
Jenalup	Blackwall Reach	Very sacred, with strong ties to the Dreamtime stories of all Western Australian Aboriginal people
Niergarup	Preston Point	Important place of ceremony and camping for local Noongar people.
Yagan Mia	Wireless Hill	Also known as Yagan's Lookout. A "home of the long-necked turtle", an important source of food.
	Bateman	The site of a large dispute with early settlers, in which many Noongar peopled died trying to protect their land.
	Melville Wetlands	Water is essential, and all water bodies have spiritual qualities for the Indigenous people.
	Booragoon Lake	Permanent camping ground for fishing and gathering.
	Murdoch University site, including North Lake	A burial site.
Bidi Katitijiny	Piney Lakes Reserve	Sacred place for women. Also used for young boys' level one initiation.
Goolugatup	Point Heathcote	Permanent lookout, fishing and camping ground. Also used for level two initiation ceremonies.
Dyoondalup	Point Walter and Burke Drive Foreshore section of Lucky Bay	A source for quartz for axes and spearheads. Also used for men's business and level three initiation. The sand bar was used as a river crossing.
Quaada Gabee	Bicton foreshore	Contained freshwater springs.
Moondaap	Point Dundas—also used more broadly to refer to Waylen Bay, Point Heathcote and the whole Peninsula together with Point Dundas itself	The Black Riverbank/Riverbed; Place of the Bull Sharks
Margamangup	Lucky Bay foreshore in Attadale, Alfred Cove and western Applecross	Fish were caught by hand from fish traps.
Kooyagoordup	Waylen Bay foreshore	
Doontanboro	Melville Water	
Wagoorjup	Canning Bridge	
Gabbi Kowangulup	Canning River mouth	
Booragoon	Canning River, lower reaches	
Dyarlgarro Beeliar	Canning River	
Gabbiljee	Bull Creek	The wetlands provide more foods than the surrounding drier areas.
	Two Caves/Garungup	Believed to be the final resting place of the Waarkarl or Rainbow Serpent. The Garungup Caves, Rocky Bay themselves aren't actually in the City of Melville or Beeliar Boodja but the River adjacent within Beeliar is still connected to the site of the Caves opposite.
