= List of heritage places in the City of Canning =

The State Register of Heritage Places is maintained by the Heritage Council of Western Australia. As of 2026, 107 places are heritage-listed in the City of Canning, of which eight are on the State Register of Heritage Places.

== List ==
The Western Australian State Register of Heritage Places, as of 2026, lists the following heritage registered places within the City of Canning:

=== State Register of Heritage Places ===
State Register of Heritage Places in the City of Canning:

Place name	Place #	Location	Suburb or town	Co-ordinates	Built	State registered	Notes	Photo
The Chapel of the Guardian Angel	4607	190 Treasure Road	Queens Park	31°59′59″S 115°56′34″E	1937	24 April 2003	A small red brick church designed in the Inter-War Old English style, with a steeply pitched clay tile roof and a small steeple; Part of the former Sister Kate’s Children’s Home, an Aboriginal childcare facility	
Castledare Boys' Home (former)	4579	108 Fern Road	Wilson	32°01′22″S 115°54′51″E	1906	7 April 1998	Also referred to as Niana and St Vincent's Preparatory School for Boys; Built in the Federation Queen Anne style	
Former Sikh Cemetery	4612	Bicentennial Adenia Reserve	Riverton	32°02′03″S 115°54′38″E	1932	2 September 1997	Cremation site; A rare phenomenon in the history of Western Australia, recognises an individual practice of a cultural group at a time when conformity to established English and Australian practice was the norm; Commemorated through the Australian Sikh Heritage Trail	
Woodloes Homestead	433	39 Woodloes Street	Cannington	32°01′39″S 115°56′31″E	1871	21 January 1997	Built in colonial vernacular architecture, one of the earliest architect designed properties in Western Australia	
Convict Fence	4609	Canning River between Salter Point & Shelley Bridge	Shelley	32°01′20″S 115°53′07″E	1866	12 December 1997	A line of the fence posts in the middle of the Canning River associated with the convict period of Western Australian history; Part of a navigation channel that was excavated in the shallow parts of the river	
Kent Street Weir Park	4611	Canning River Regional Park	Wilson	32°01′17″S 115°55′15″E	1926	21 December 2012	One of the few examples of weirs within the Perth Metropolitan area	
Canning Town Hall	431	Corner Albany Highway & George Street	Cannington	32°00′58″S 115°55′48″E	1909	23 May 1997	A good example of simple country building from the turn of the century	
Canning War Memorial	432	Corner Albany Highway & Manning Road	Cannington	32°00′48″S 115°55′38″E	1921, relocated 1956	23 May 1997	A stone arch war memorial from World War One	

=== Heritage-listed places ===
Heritage-listed places in the City of Canning:

Place name	inHerit number	Street number	Street name	Suburb or town	Other listings
Grose's House and Shed	11942	59	Nicholson Rd	Cannington	Municipal Inventory Adopted 08 Aug 1995 (City of Canning)
Queens Park Memorial Hall (site)	14009		George St	Queens Park	Statewide War Memorial Survey Completed 1 May 1996
House	11949	3	Short St	Cannington	Municipal Inventory Adopted 08 Aug 1995 (City of Canning)
Willetton Post Office	25937	39	Burrendah Bvd	Willetton	Municipal Inventory Adopted 17 Oct 2017 (City of Canning)
St Josephs R.C. School & Convent	11933	136-144	Railway Pde	Queens Park	Municipal Inventory Adopted 17 Oct 2017 (City of Canning), Municipal Inventory Adopted 08 Aug 1995 (City of Canning)
St Francis of Assisi RC Church	13151	56	Redcliffe St	East Cannington	Catholic Church Inventory Adopted 01 Jul 1998, Municipal Inventory Adopted 15 Sep 2015 (City of Canning), Municipal Inventory Adopted 17 Oct 2017 (City of Canning)
Nicholson Road Bridge	11963		Nicholson Rd	Cannington	Municipal Inventory Adopted 17 Oct 2017 (City of Canning), Municipal Inventory Adopted 08 Aug 1995 (City of Canning)
Cannington Primary School	15239	147	Wharf St	Cannington	
Second Hand Goods Store	11943	57	Nicholson Rd	Cannington	Municipal Inventory Adopted 17 Oct 2017 (City of Canning), Municipal Inventory Adopted 08 Aug 1995 (City of Canning)
Cannington Senior High School	5626	301	Sevenoaks St	Cannington	
Welshpool-Kewdale Railway Link (fmr)	25938	151	Welshpool Rd	Welshpool	Municipal Inventory Adopted 17 Oct 2017 (City of Canning)
Brownlie Towers	4608	32-48	Dumond St	Bentley	Municipal Inventory Adopted 17 Oct 2017 (City of Canning), Municipal Inventory Adopted 08 Aug 1995 (City of Canning), RHP - Assessed-Below Threshold Current 13 Dec 2002
Sister Kate's Children's Home (fmr)	5068	190-196	Treasure Rd	Queens Park	Municipal Inventory Adopted (City of Canning), RHP - Assessed-Stakeholder Consultation Current 24 Jun 2011
Eucalypt Tree	11956	Cnr	Carden Dr & Oak St	Cannington	Municipal Inventory Adopted (City of Canning)
Spaceship - Glennon Park	11935	6-8	Aveley St	Willetton	Municipal Inventory Adopted 08 Aug 1995 (City of Canning)
Uniting Church, Hall & Lilly Foss Centre	15025	44	Woodloes St	Cannington	Uniting Church Inventory Completed 01 Oct 1996
Canning Vale Police Station	18991	449	Nicholson Rd	Canning Vale	RHP - Does not warrant assessment Current 28 Sep 2012
Canning River Regional Park	26082		Woodloes St; Fern Rd; Adenia Rd; Riverton Drive;	Rssmyn Shelley Rivtn Ferndale Cngtn Wilson	Municipal Inventory Adopted 17 Oct 2017 (City of Canning)
Cannington Police Station	17402	1325	Albany Hwy	Cannington	RHP - Does not warrant assessment Current 28 Sep 2012
Uniting Church Manse	15031	32	Bungaree Rd	Wilson	Uniting Church Inventory Completed 01 Oct 1996
House 58 Stockman Way, Cannington	19846	58	Stockman Way	Cannington	RHP - Does not warrant assessment Current 25 Feb 2011
Owen Simms House	11945	8	Oak St	Cannington	Municipal Inventory Adopted 08 Aug 1995 (City of Canning)
Tuart Tree 20-26 Hybanthus Street	23787	20-26	Hybanthus St	Riverton	RHP - Does not warrant assessment Current 30 Mar 2012
Uniting Church Manse	15029	42	Sheldrake Way	Willetton	Uniting Church Inventory Completed 01 Oct 1996
Mini Golf Course, Castledare Estate	17701	14	Castledare Pl	Wilson	Municipal Inventory Adopted 17 Oct 2017 (City of Canning)
Carousel Shopping Centre	25939	1348	Albany Hwy	Cannington	Municipal Inventory Adopted 17 Oct 2017 (City of Canning)
Bentley Hospital	25940	18	Mills St	Bentley	Municipal Inventory Adopted 17 Oct 2017 (City of Canning)
Bakery Site & House	11941	9-11	River Rd	Cannington	Municipal Inventory Adopted 08 Aug 1995 (City of Canning)
Canning Vale Freight Line	26083		Vulcan Road, between Hollingsworth Wy and Nicholson Ct	Canning Vale	Municipal Inventory Adopted 17 Oct 2017 (City of Canning)
Cannington Post Office	26081	1348	Albany Highway	Cannington	Municipal Inventory Adopted 17 Oct 2017 (City of Canning)
Uniting Church Manse	15027	13	Gallant Way	Lynwood	Uniting Church Inventory Completed 01 Oct 1996
Lorne	11952	13	River Rd	Cannington	Municipal Inventory Adopted 17 Oct 2017 (City of Canning), Municipal Inventory Adopted 08 Aug 1995 (City of Canning)
Richard's Produce Store	11946	1363	Albany Hwy	Cannington	Municipal Inventory Adopted 08 Aug 1995 (City of Canning)
House	11938	1	Woodloes St	Cannington	Municipal Inventory Adopted 08 Aug 1995 (City of Canning), Municipal Inventory Adopted 17 Oct 2017 (City of Canning)
House	11951	10	River Rd	Cannington	Municipal Inventory Adopted 08 Aug 1995 (City of Canning)
Anglican Rectory	11643	8	Farleigh Dr	Willetton	Anglican Church Inventory YES 31 Jul 1996
Carousel Tavern	3495		Albany Hwy	Cannington	
House	11940	19	Woodloes St	Cannington	Municipal Inventory Adopted 08 Aug 1995 (City of Canning)
Fence Post	26080	27	Tyre Avenue	Riverton	Municipal Inventory Adopted 17 Oct 2017 (City of Canning)
Welshpool Munitions Factory	25941	9-11	Adams Dr	Welshpool	Municipal Inventory Adopted 17 Oct 2017 (City of Canning)
Cannington Methodist Church	11944	1455	Albany Hwy	Cannington	Municipal Inventory Adopted 08 Aug 1995 (City of Canning)
Coronation Hotel, Queens Park	19847	148-154	Railway Pde	Queens Park	
Queens Park Worship Centre & Hall	15030	50	Stockman Way	Queens Park	Uniting Church Inventory Completed 01 Oct 1996
St Norbert College & St Joseph's Priory	11934	129-147	Treasure Rd	Queens Park	Municipal Inventory Adopted 08 Aug 1995 (City of Canning), Municipal Inventory Adopted 17 Oct 2017 (City of Canning)
Bentley Senior High School	8254		Marquis St	Bentley	RHP - Does not warrant assessment Current 19 Apr 2013
St Michael & All Angels Church	11484	48	George Way	Cannington	Anglican Church Inventory Adopted 31 Jul 1996
St Andrew's Anglican Church	11612	Cnr	Beatrice Av & Bernier Rd	Riverton	Anglican Church Inventory YES 31 Jul 1996
Canning River Wetlands / Open Space System	4418			Riverton to Canning	Classified by the National Trust Classified {Lscpe} 06 Aug 1979, Register of the National Estate Registered 30 Jun 1992
Cottage and Stables	11937	49	Marriamup St	Cannington	Municipal Inventory Adopted 08 Aug 1995 (City of Canning)
Two WA Christmas Trees	5877		Manning Rd	Wilson	Classified by the National Trust Recorded
Cannington Masonic Hall	11950	14	Woodloes St	Cannington	Municipal Inventory Adopted 08 Aug 1995 (City of Canning)
Ernie Clark's House	11947	3-19	Richmond St	Cannington	Municipal Inventory Adopted 08 Aug 1995 (City of Canning)
Manning Road Trees	23659		Manning Rd	Bentley & Wilson	RHP - Does not warrant assessment Current 24 Feb 2012
Street Trees Albany Highway, Bentley	18938		John St, Ashburton St and Albany Hwy	Bentley	RHP - Does not warrant assessment Current 28 May 2010
Kent Street Weir	4611		Canning River	Wilson & Ferndale	Classified by the National Trust Classified 14 Apr 1998, Municipal Inventory Adopted 17 Oct 2017 (City of Canning), Municipal Inventory Adopted 08 Aug 1995 (City of Canning)
Shops	11953	1429-33	Albany Hwy	Cannington	Municipal Inventory Adopted 08 Aug 1995 (City of Canning)
Maniana Precinct	11936	bounded	Whitlock Rd, Reginald St, Stephen St, Retchford Wy, Wannell St & Wharf St	Queens Pk	Municipal Inventory Adopted 08 Aug 1995 (City of Canning), RHP - Assessed-Below Threshold Current 22 Feb 2002
Tuart Tree	1322		Hybanthus St	Lynwood	Classified by the National Trust Recorded
Landing Reserve	11960		Canning River Reg Pk, Bicentennial Adenia Reserve	Cannington	Municipal Inventory Adopted 17 Oct 2017 (City of Canning), Municipal Inventory Adopted 08 Aug 1995 (City of Canning)
Nicholson Homestead - site	11931	11	Hedgeley Wy	Canning Vale	Municipal Inventory Adopted 08 Aug 1995 (City of Canning)
Waste Water Pumping Station, Welshpool	25647	69	Welshpool Rd	Welshpool	RHP - Does not warrant assessment Current 29 Apr 2016
St Augustine's Anglican Church	11554	Cnr	Tavistock & Kenton Sts	Lynwood	Anglican Church Inventory YES 31 Jul 1995
Canning Agricultural Hall	430	1430	Albany Hwy	Cannington	
Yeeda Street Respite	13179	8	Yeeda St	Riverton	Catholic Church Inventory Adopted 01 Jul 1998
Riverton Bridge	11962		Canning River	Riverton	Municipal Inventory Adopted 17 Oct 2017 (City of Canning), Municipal Inventory Adopted 08 Aug 1995 (City of Canning)
Worship Centre	15028	14-16	Herald Av	Willetton	Uniting Church Inventory Completed 01 Oct 1996
House	16355		Cnr Willeri Dve & Collins Rd	Willetton	
Cannington Fire Station (fmr)	14475	44	George St	Queens Park	Fire & Rescue Service Heritage Inventory Adopted 30 Aug 1997
Market City, Canning Vale	17309	280	Bannister Rd	Canning Vale	RHP - Does not warrant assessment Current 31 Mar 2006
Mason's Landing	11957	59	Marriamup St	Cannington	Municipal Inventory Adopted 08 Aug 1995 (City of Canning), Municipal Inventory Adopted 17 Oct 2017 (City of Canning)
Rossmoyne Reserve (Old Quarry)	11958	52-54	Central Rd	Rossmoyne	Municipal Inventory Adopted 08 Aug 1995 (City of Canning)
Pallottine Mission Centre, Rossmoyne	18576	50	Fifth Av	Rossmoyne	RHP - To be assessed Current 19 Dec 2008
House	11939	3	Woodloes St	Cannington	Municipal Inventory Adopted 08 Aug 1995 (City of Canning)
Welshpool Fire Station	14656	380	Welshpool R d	Welshpool	Fire & Rescue Service Heritage Inventory Adopted 30 Aug 1997
House, 154 Hill View Terrace, St James	25486	154	Hill View Tce	St James	RHP - Does not warrant assessment Current 27 Oct 2017
Canning City Council Administration Centre and Site	11932	1317	Albany Hwy	Cannington	Municipal Inventory Adopted 08 Aug 1995 (City of Canning), Municipal Inventory Adopted 17 Oct 2017 (City of Canning)
Canning Fire Station (fmr) - site	11954	44	George Way	Cannington	Municipal Inventory Adopted 08 Aug 1995 (City of Canning), Municipal Inventory Adopted 17 Oct 2017 (City of Canning), Fire & Rescue Service Heritage Inventory Adopted 30 Aug 1997
Belney Cottage	11948	36	Woodloes St	Cannington	Municipal Inventory Adopted 08 Aug 1995 (City of Canning)
Cannington Railway Station (fmr)	25928	Lot 4973	Sevenoaks Street	East Cannington	Municipal Inventory Adopted 17 Oct 2017 (City of Canning)
Canning Vale Fire Station	14474	13	Catalano Rd	Canning Vale	Fire & Rescue Service Heritage Inventory Adopted 30 Aug 1997
Our Lady of Perpetual Help Church	13043	100	Fern Rd	Wilson	Catholic Church Inventory Adopted 01 Jul 1998, RHP - To be assessed Current 23 Mar 2007
Swan Brewery	11955	25	Baile Rd	Canning Vale	Municipal Inventory Adopted (City of Canning)
Our Lady Queen of Apostles RC Church	13086	53	Tudor Av	Riverton	Catholic Church Inventory Adopted 01 Jul 1998
Landing at Nicholson Road Bridge	11959	83	Nicholson Rd	Ferndale	Municipal Inventory Adopted 08 Aug 1995 (City of Canning)
Christ The King Parish Centre	11644	Cnr	Glenkerry/Killara/Gerber Sts	Willetton	Anglican Church Inventory YES 31 Jul 1996
Lot 888	9202	89-93	Chapman Rd	Bentley	RHP - Does not warrant assessment Current 29 May 1998
