= Australian Sikh Heritage Trail =

Heritage site and monument in Riverton, Western Australia

Coordinates: 32°02′03″S 115°54′38″E

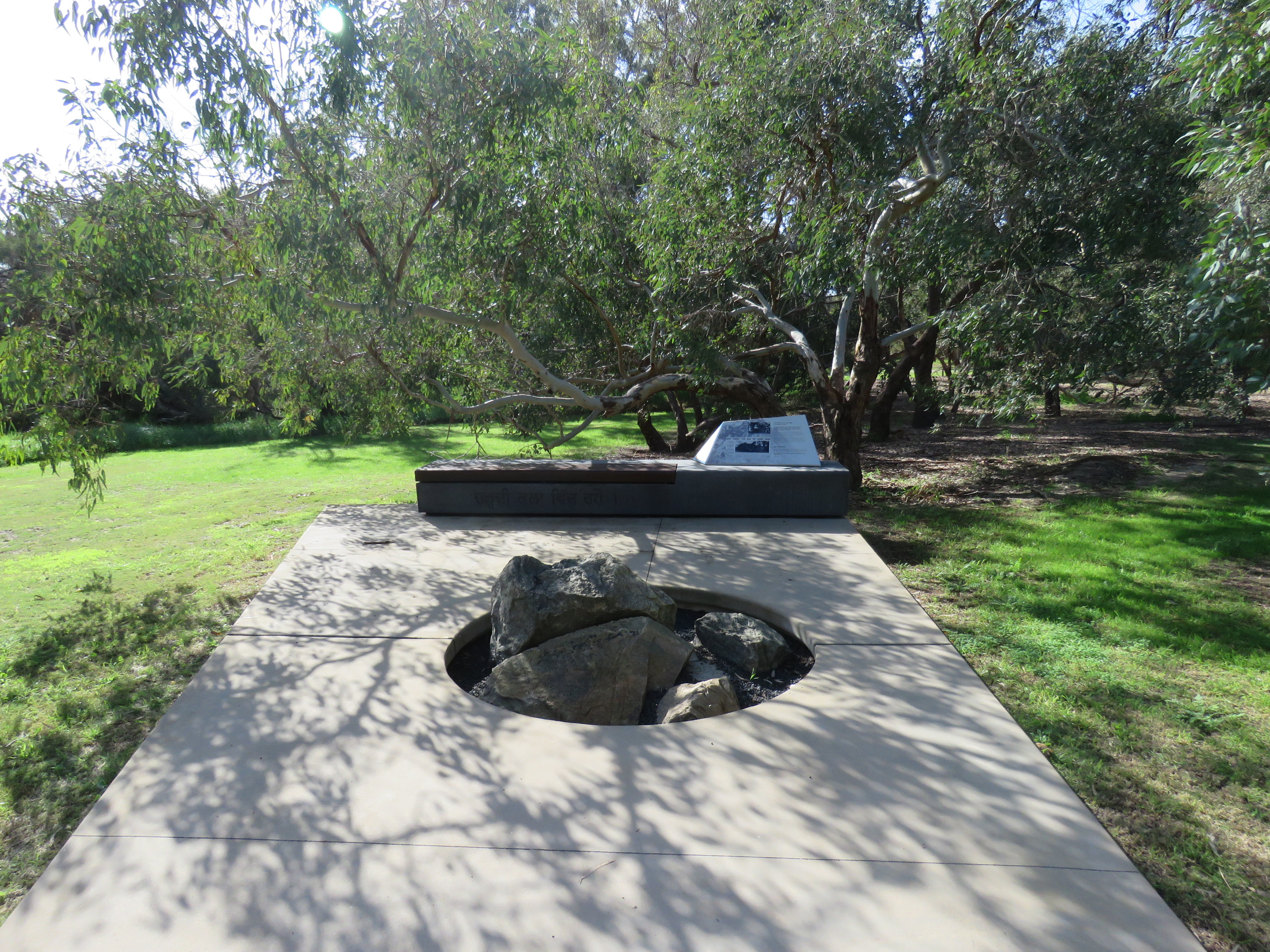
The Australian Sikh Heritage Trail in June 2021

The Australian Sikh Heritage Trail, a group of interconnected pathways in Adenia Park, Riverton, Western Australia, is a monument commemorating the history of Sikhs in Australia. The location, adjacent to the Canning River within the Canning River Regional Park, is significant as the heritage-listed Sikh cremation site. The winding trail features interpretive signage, plaques, benches, a sheltered area, and a boardwalk by the river. Information on the signs is organised by theme, such as Sikh farmers, Sikh wrestlers, Sikh Anzacs, Sikh hawkers and Sikh entrepreneurs.

The Australian Sikh Heritage Trail was created through a collaboration of the state government's Department of Biodiversity, Conservation and Attractions (DBCA), the City of Canning, the Australian Sikh Heritage Association, the Sikh Association of Western Australia and Sikh Gurdwara Perth, over a period of three years. Initial funding of A$150,000 came from a Lotterywest grant, while the City of Canning contributed A$35,000 for construction. The department managed the project, with City of Canning responsible for construction and maintenance.

The trail was officially opened on 17 April 2018 by Minister for Environment Stephen Dawson, Acting Local Government and Heritage Minister Bill Johnston, and City of Canning mayor Paul Ng. The annual Australian Sikh Heritage Day was held there on 2 March 2019, attended by local and federal members of parliament, mayors, and the Consul General of India in Perth.

The 250-metre (820 ft) trail also presents information related to the Whadjuk Noongar culture and Swan Canning Riverpark, and is part of the broader Swan Canning Riverpark Trails Project of interpretation facilities called River Journeys.

== See also ==
- Western Australian Heritage Trails Network
- Man Mohan Singh (pilot)
