= Canning Highway =

Highway in Perth, Western Australia

Canning Highway Western Australia
- Canning Highway running through Applecross

General information
- Type: Highway
- Length: 17 km (11 mi)
- Opened: 1920s
- Route number(s): State Route 6 (all sections); National Route 1 (Great Eastern Highway to Kwinana Freeway)

Major junctions
- Northeast end: Great Eastern Highway (National Highway 94 / National Route 1), Victoria Park
- The Causeway (State Route 5); Kwinana Freeway (State Route 2); Stirling Highway (State Route 5)
- Southwest end: Queen Victoria Street (State Route 12), Fremantle

Location(s)
- Major settlements: South Perth, Kensington, Como, Applecross, East Fremantle

Highway system
- Highways in Australia; National Highway • Freeways in Australia; Highways in Western Australia

Canning Highway is an arterial road in Perth, Western Australia, linking the inner Perth suburb of Victoria Park in the north-east, to the port city of Fremantle in the south-west.

The road is mostly a four-lane divided carriageway, with a general speed limit of 60 km/h (37 mph). It is located immediately south of the Swan River and runs between The Causeway in Victoria Park and Queen Victoria Street in Fremantle.

Canning Highway was the inspiration for the AC/DC song "Highway to Hell" as it had a reputation for accidents and led to many of singer Bon Scott's favourite pubs and hotels, including the Raffles Hotel.

== History ==
Canning Highway is named after the river which it crosses, which was in turn named after George Canning (1770–1827), an eminent British statesman who for a brief period was Prime Minister of Great Britain.

The modern highway was formally commenced in the 1920s, with major work commencing in 1927 to upgrade an 8-mile (13 km) section between Suburban Street, South Perth (now Mill Point Road) and Petra Street, East Fremantle. The road initially had the following names:

- Canning Road (Fremantle–Wireless Hill)
- Perth–Fremantle Road (Wireless Hill–Canning Bridge)
- Lower Canning Road (Canning Bridge–South Terrace)
- Fremantle Road (South Terrace–Causeway)

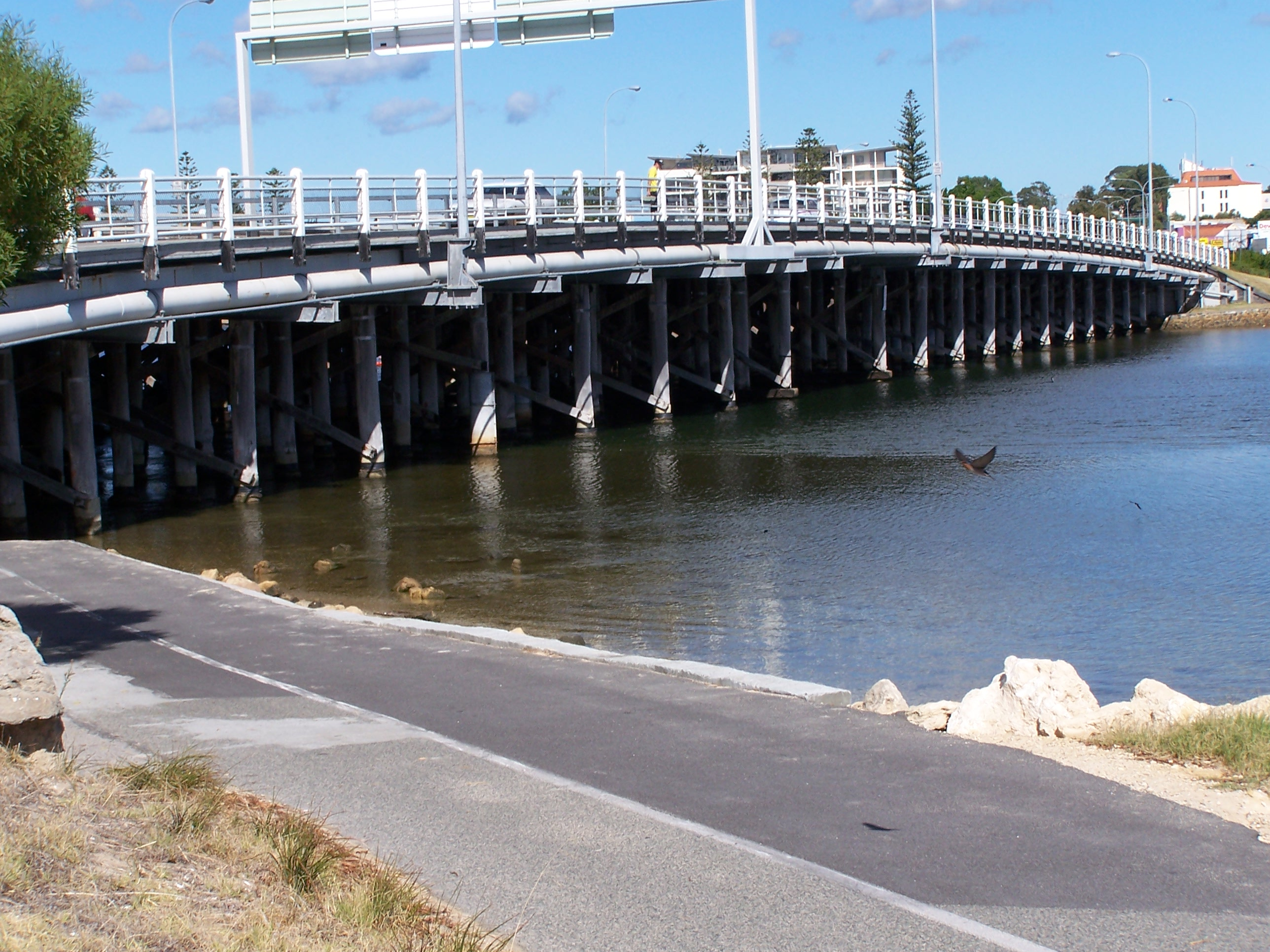
Canning Bridge

The road was officially named Canning Highway on 23 November 1937. In 1938, the present northern bridge over Canning River was opened. It was 32 feet (9.8 m) wide and constructed of timber, as was then common practice. The experience gained building this bridge was used to construct the Fremantle Traffic Bridge over the Swan River one year later. The Fremantle Traffic Bridge joined Canning Highway near Fremantle with North Fremantle, and this intersection forms the highway's present western terminus.

In 1958, the present southern bridge over Canning River was constructed which coincided with the opening of Kwinana Freeway between the Narrows Bridge and Canning Highway.

In 1974, the rotary (roundabout) at the southern end of the Causeway in Victoria Park was upgraded to a parclo interchange, which resulted in Canning Highway joining seamlessly with Great Eastern Highway. At the same time, Stirling Highway was extended from North Fremantle across the Swan River via the new Stirling bridge to join with Canning Highway.

In 1979, a new diamond interchange was built near Canning Bridge to route the Kwinana Freeway underneath Canning Highway and progress the freeway further southwards.

Apart from minor additional lanes and modifications, the highway has remained largely unchanged since.

=== Raffles Hotel ===
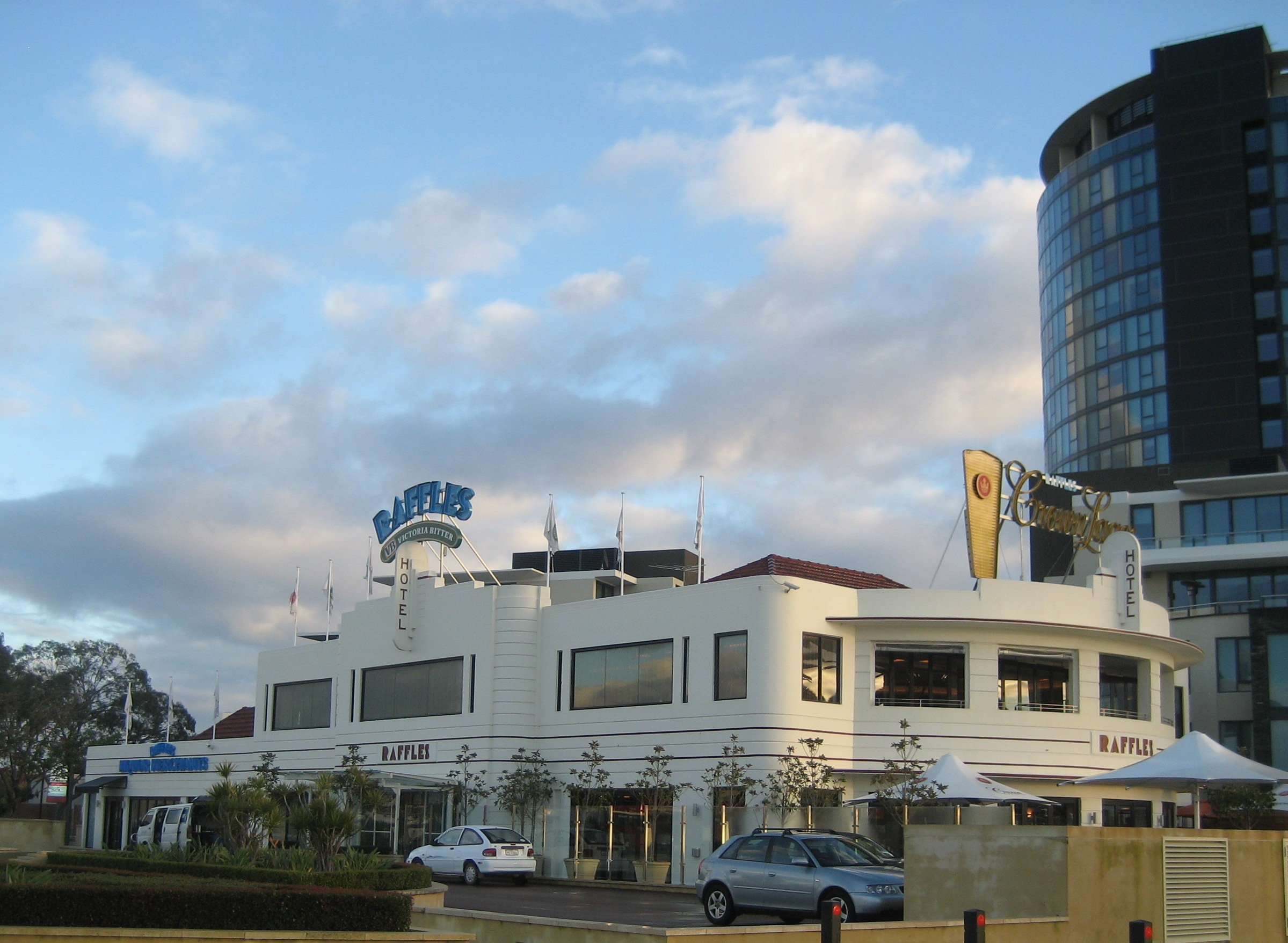
The Raffles Hotel

One of the most enduring sights on Canning Highway has been the Raffles Hotel at night-time, with its ornamental lighting and an iconic animated rooftop neon beer sign (for many years advertising Swan Lager). It is situated in Applecross adjacent to Canning Bridge. The hotel has reopened with a pub and a bottle shop called Raffles Liquor Merchants. The Raffles later swapped to two beer advertising neon lights, one for Victoria bitter and one large one advertising Crown lager. Since at least 2015 however, the neon lights now advertise Asahi Super Dry.

== Public transport ==
Canning Highway crosses the Kwinana Freeway at the Canning Bridge station on the Mandurah railway line. Buses also stop at this station and enter and exit the freeway via bus lanes. High frequency route 910 traverses the whole length of Canning Highway, and route 111 also runs along the section of the highway west of Canning Bridge. Special event route 659 runs a limited stop route along Canning Highway between Fremantle Station and Perth Stadium.

== Major intersections & interchanges ==
The entire highway is located in the Perth Metropolitan Region. All intersections mentioned below are signalised unless otherwise mentioned.

LGA	Location	km	mi	Destinations	Notes
Victoria Park	Burswood–Victoria Park boundary	0.00	0.00	Great Eastern Highway northeast (National Route 1 / (National Highway 94) / The Causeway northwest (State Route 5) / Shepperton Road southeast (State Route 30) / Albany Highway southeast – Midland, Perth, Armadale	Partially grade separated with no access into Albany Highway. Causeway to Canning Highway southbound is looped. Canning Highway northeast bound to Shepperton Road is at-grade; State Route 6 eastern terminus; National Route 1 continues southwest and northeast
Victoria Park	Victoria Park	0.8	0.50	Berwick Street – Bentley, St. James	
South Perth	South Perth	1.2	0.75	Way Road	Way Road connects Canning Highway to Mill Point Road
South Perth	South Perth	2.0	1.2	Douglas Avenue – Kensington, Bentley, Curtin University	
South Perth	South Perth–Como boundary	2.8	1.7	South Terrace	
South Perth	Como	3.9	2.4	Thelma Street (west) – South Perth / Barker Avenue (southeast)	Thelma Street connects Canning Highway to Labouchere Road
South Perth	Como	5.0	3.1	Henley Street – Manning, Karawara	
South Perth	Como	5.5	3.4	Kwinana Freeway (State Route 2) southbound ramps – Rockingham / Manning Road (State Route 26) (east) – Manning, Salter Point	Modified diamond interchange (Kwinana Freeway free flowing). National Route 1 western concurrency terminus; additional "bus-only" ramps to/from Perth; southbound entrance and Manning Road exit ramps merge, requiring weaving.
South Perth	Como	5.7	3.5	Kwinana Freeway (State Route 2) northbound ramps – Perth, Joondalup / Manning Road (State Route 26) northbound ramp	Similar to above, however there is no right turn availability from Canning Highway westbound to Kwinana Freeway northbound.
Canning River		5.8– 6.0	3.6– 3.7	Canning Bridge	
Melville	Applecross–Mount Pleasant boundary	6.1	3.8	Canning Beach Road (north) / Kintail Road (west)	No right turn access from Canning Beach/Kintail Road southbound onto Canning Highway westbound
Melville	Applecross–Mount Pleasant boundary	6.6	4.1	Sleat Road	
Melville	Applecross	7.0	4.3	Reynolds Road	
Melville	Applecross–Ardross boundary	7.4	4.6	Ardross Street	
Melville	Applecross–Ardross boundary	8.0	5.0	Riseley Street – Booragoon	
Melville	Alfred Cove–Attadale boundary	10.2	6.3	North Lake Road – Myaree, Kardinya, Cockburn Central	
Melville	Attadale–Bicton–Melville–Palmyra quadripoint	12.3	7.6	Stock Road – O'Connor, Rockingham	
Melville	Bicton–Palmyra boundary	13.7	8.5	Carrington Street – Hamilton Hill	
Melville–East Fremantle Boundary	Bicton–East Fremantle–Palmyra tripoint	14.0	8.7	Petra Street	
East Fremantle	East Fremantle	15.2	9.4	Preston Point Road	
East Fremantle	East Fremantle	15.4	9.6	Stirling Highway (State Route 5, Tourist Drive 204) – Mosman Park, Claremont, Perth	
Fremantle	Fremantle	16.1	10.0	Queen Victoria Street (State Route 12) – North Fremantle, Cottesloe	Highway terminus: continues west as Queen Victoria Street (State Route 12) to Fremantle CBD
1.000 mi = 1.609 km; 1.000 km = 0.621 mi: Incomplete access

== See also ==
- Highways in Australia
- List of highways in Western Australia
- List of major roads in Perth, Western Australia
