= Swan Canning Riverpark =

Collection of waterways and parks in Western Australia

Swan Canning Riverpark consists of the waterways and public foreshore reserves in the Swan and Canning Rivers in Perth, Western Australia. Established under the Swan and Canning Rivers Management Act 2006, it has an area of 72.1 square kilometres (27.8 sq mi).

It is managed by the Parks and Wildlife Service of the WA Department of Biodiversity, Conservation and Attractions (DBCA) in conjunction with local authorities and on behalf of the Swan River Trust.

== See also ==
- Canning River Regional Park
- Walyunga National Park
- Avon Valley National Park
- Melville Water, including Swan Estuary Marine Park
- Perth Water
