= Castledare Boys' Home =

Heritage listed building in Wilson, Western Australia

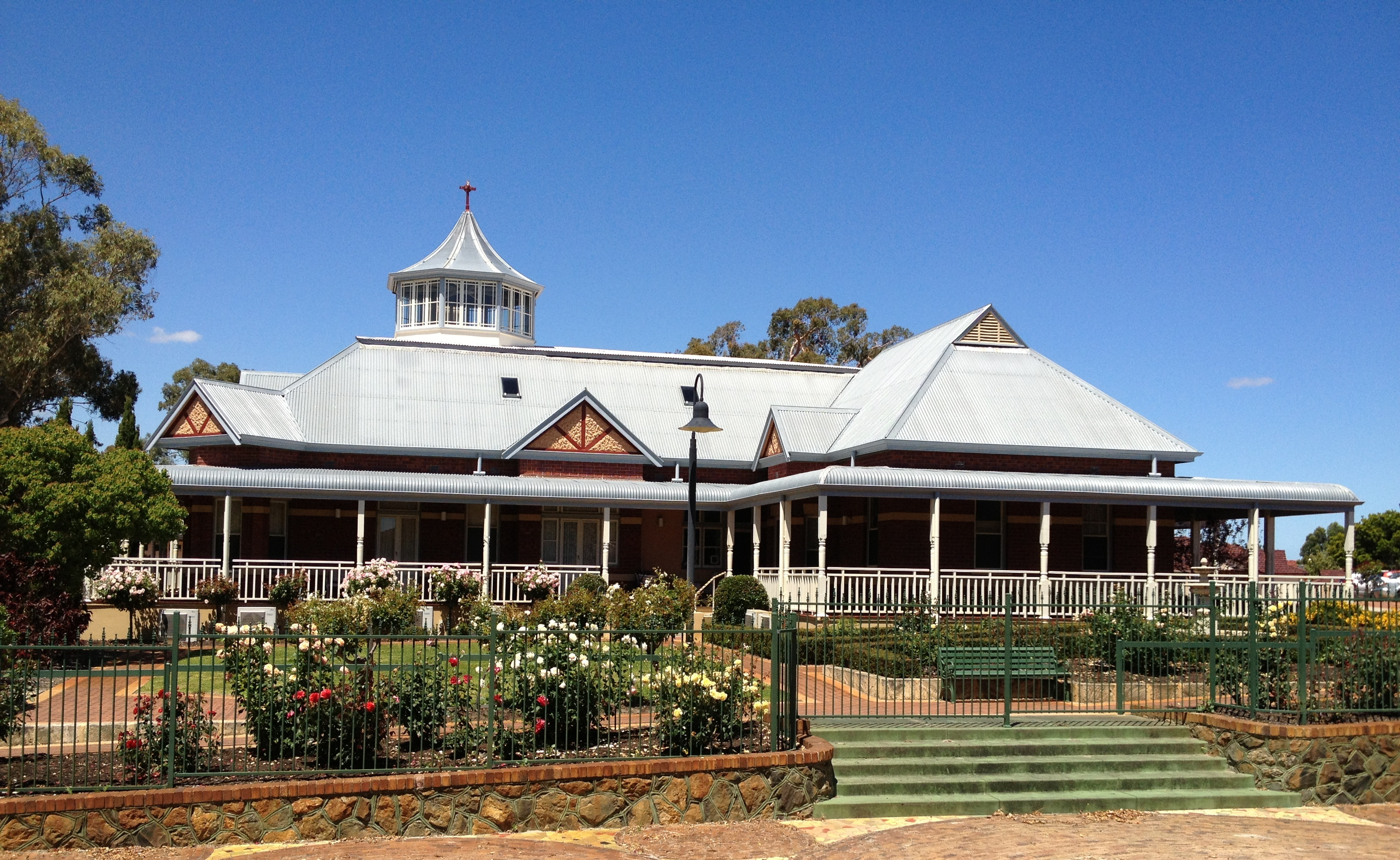
- Castledare homestead in 2012

- Location within Perth

General information
- Type: Residential college
- Location: Wilson, Western Australia, Western Australia
- Coordinates: 32.0227°S 115.9141°E

Western Australia Heritage Register
- Designated: 7 April 1998
- Reference no.: 4579

Castledare Boys' Home was a residential college in Wilson, Western Australia owned and operated by the Congregation of Christian Brothers from March 1929 to 1983 and established for the treatment and training of intellectually handicapped children. A 1929 newspaper article announcing the opening described it as a "training school for sub-normal boys". It opened with ten boys and under the directorship of Brother G. Hyland. The state psychologist, Ethel Stoneham, travelled to Europe and the United States to study similar institutions and was influential in the design of the home.

Later it had a more general educational and residential focus, accommodating boys from various backgrounds, including child migrants, wards of the state, and orphans.

The site was previously a pastoral property called Niana built by the Fleming family between 1906 and 1908, and when taken over occupied 34 hectares (83 acres). It is on the banks of the Canning River and adjoins Canning River Regional Park. A Federation style homestead on the property is listed on the State Heritage Register.

The first child migrants from the UK came to Castledare in the late 1930s. This ceased temporarily during World War II. Nuns were introduced in 1949, by which time there were 100 primary school children.

The Mother of Perpetual Succour Chapel was constructed in 1957 and blessed and opened by Archbishop Redmond Prendiville. In 1977 the chapel became the parish church of Wilson.

Castledare Miniature Railway is a rideable miniature railway on the grounds that is open to the public. It has operated since the early 1960s.

In 1994, the Parliament of Western Australia was presented a petition with 30,000 signatures demanding an inquiry into the sexual and physical assault that took place in various institutions run by the Christian Brothers, including Castledare. Other institutions included in the petition were Bindoon, Clontarf and Tardun.

In 1998 the site was redeveloped as an aged care facility and retirement village called Castledare Retirement Village and operated by Catholic Homes Incorporated.
