= Waylen Bay =

Bay in Perth, Western Australia

Coordinates: 32°00′S 115°50′E

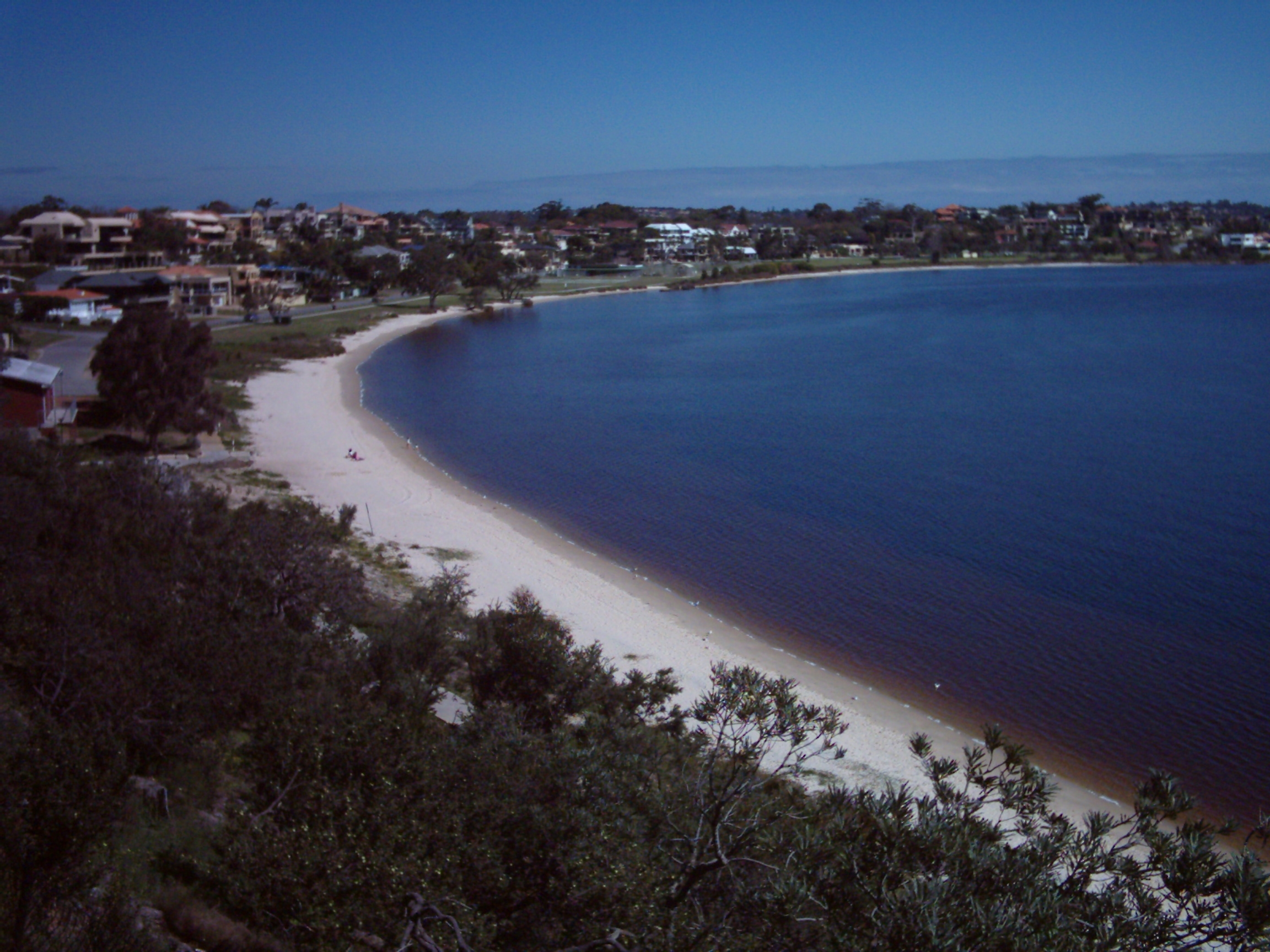
Waylen Bay viewed from Point Heathcote

Waylen Bay is a small embayment on the west coast of Australia, situated in the Perth suburb of Applecross between Point Dundas to Point Heathcote. In 1925 it was designated in real estate promotional material as a component of a larger Frenchmans Bay in what is Melville Water.

One of the main features of Waylen Bay is a Scout Hall, situated right on the bank. It is home to the Waylen Bay Sea Scout Troop. Waylen Bay is just around the corner from South of Perth Yacht Club.
