= Riverton Bridge =

Bridge in Perth, Western Australia

Coordinates: 32°01′40″S 115°54′04″E

Designations

Western Australia Heritage Register
- Official name: Riverton Road Bridge
- Type: Municipal Inventory
- Designated: 18 September 2018
- Reference no.: 11962
- Municipality: City of Canning

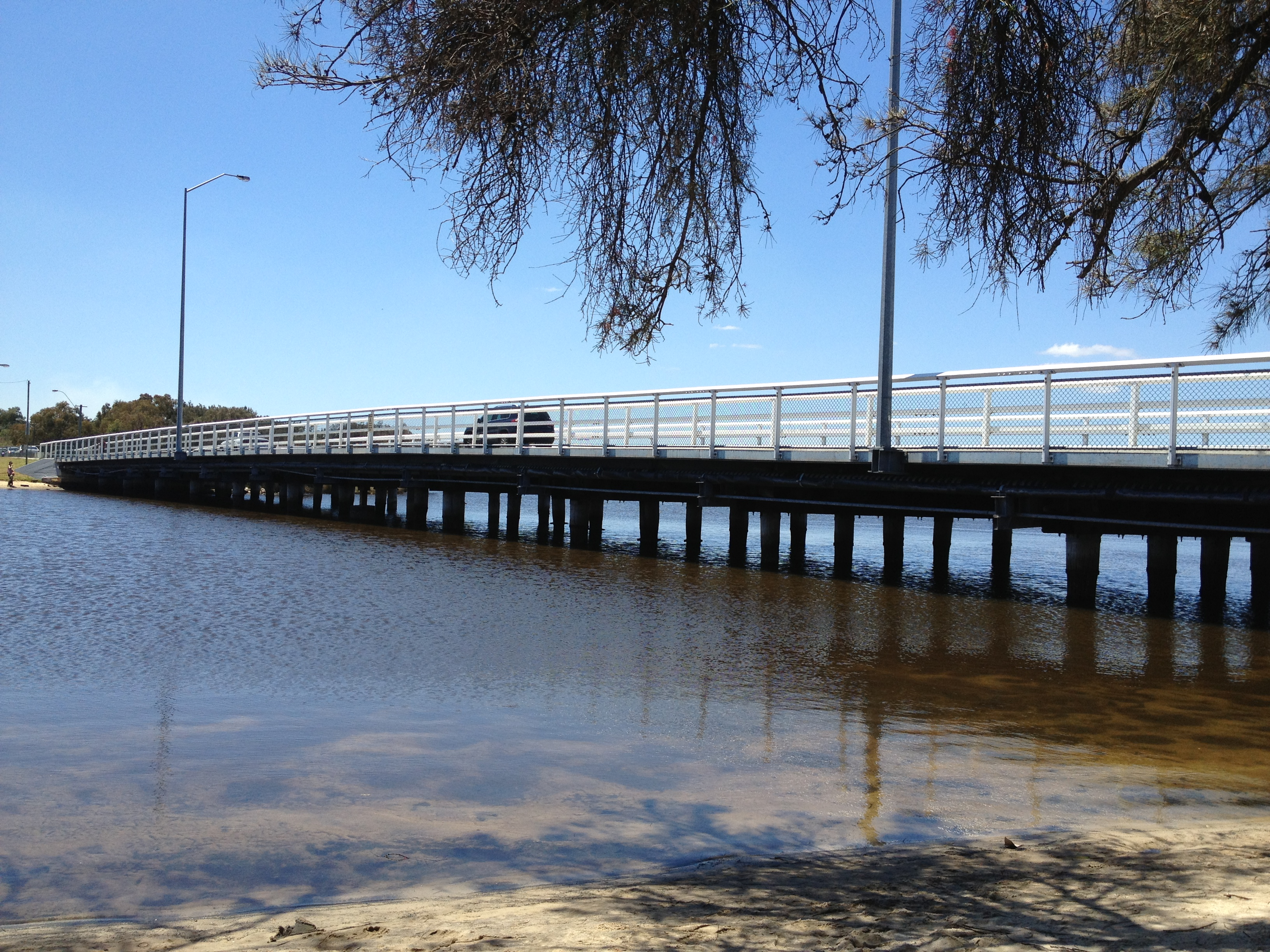
Riverton Bridge

Riverton Bridge is a two-lane road traffic bridge spanning the Canning River at Riverton, in Perth, Western Australia.

It was originally built in 1911 and known as the Watts Road Bridge, being renamed to Riverton Bridge in 1916. By the 1930s the bridge had fallen into disrepair. In 1954 it was replaced with the current structure, which is slightly upstream of the original. Part of the original bridge was kept as a swimming jetty, but this was demolished in 1980 for safety reasons.

Until the 1970s the bridge formed part of the major east–west road system south of the Canning River and was part of what was then High Road between Fremantle and Cannington. In 1978, High Road was upgraded and realigned to become Leach Highway, and as part of that project the concrete four-lane Shelley Bridge was built appropriately 470 metres (1,540 ft) downstream. Since then, Riverton Bridge has been used for mainly local traffic.

In 1937 the suburb of Riverton was informally called Riverton Bridge to avoid confusion with the South Australian town of Riverton.
