= Melville Water =

Section of river in Perth, Western Australia

Coordinates: 32.00°S 115.83°E

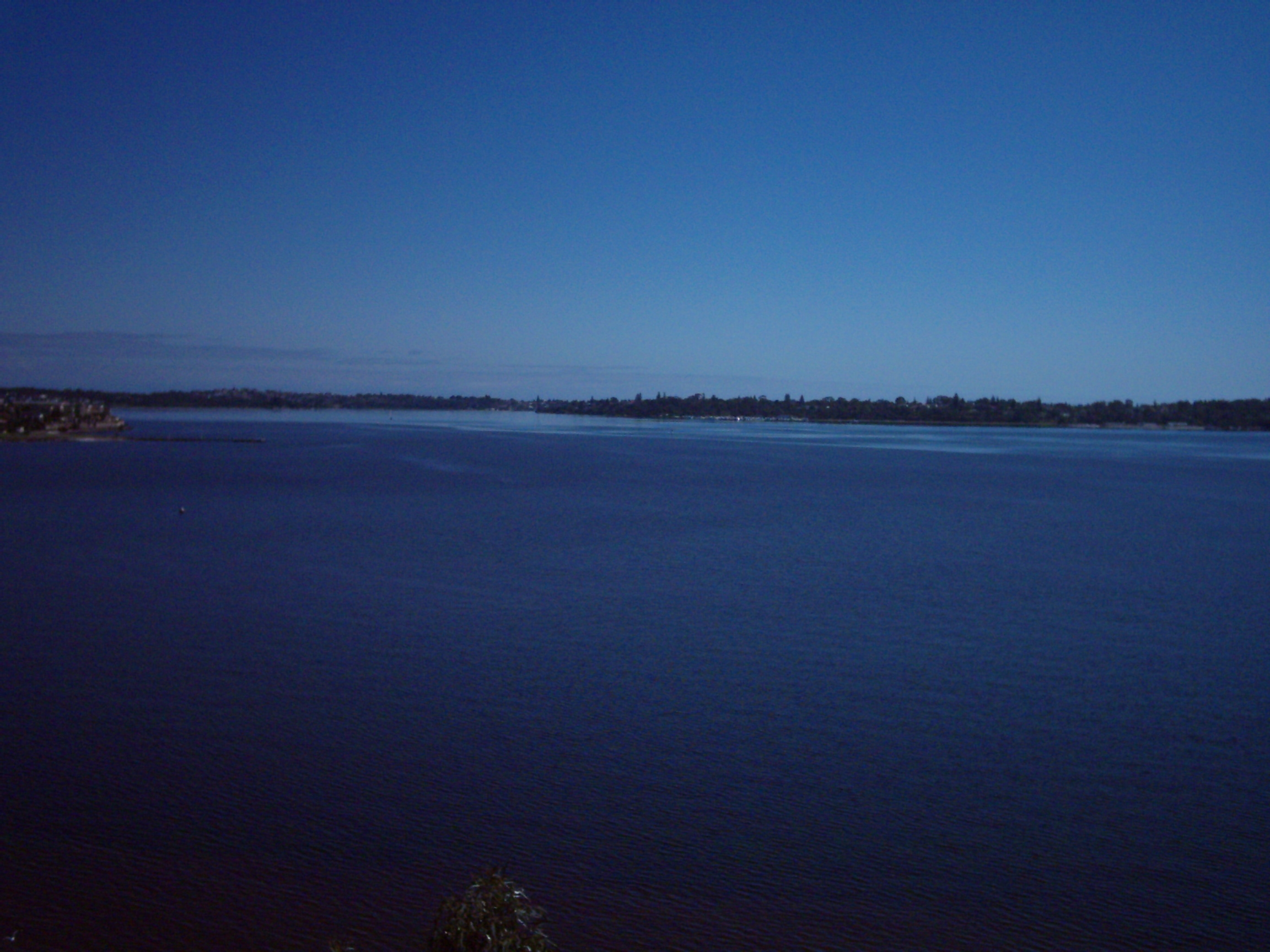
Melville Water, picture taken from Point Heathcote, looking west

Melville Water is a significant section of the Swan River in Perth, Western Australia. It is located west and downstream of Perth Water, from which it is separated by the Narrows Bridge.

== Name ==
Melville Water was named in 1827 by Captain James Stirling, after 2nd Viscount Melville. The land south of Melville Water was named Melville Water Park Estate (in the area that is now Applecross) and was subdivided for development in 1896.

== Extent ==
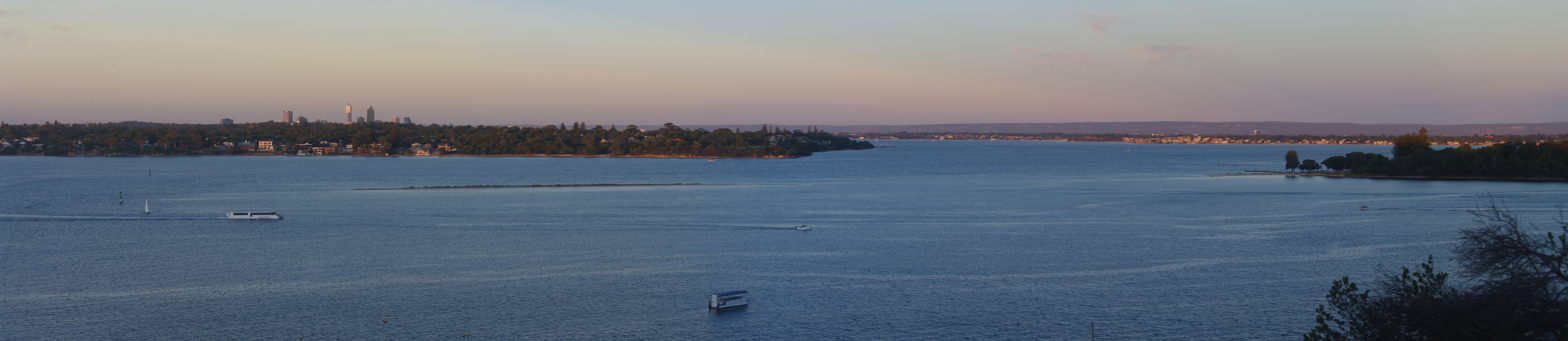
Panorama of Melville water looking east from Mosman Park.

Melville Water lies between Point Resolution and Point Walter to the west, Point Heathcote at the mouth of the Canning River to the south-east, and the Narrows Bridge where it meets Perth Water to the north-east. In that space it has marine parks (Swan Estuary marine park in Lucky Bay and Alfred Cove), water ski areas (Waylen Bay, and Point Walter) as well as the Narrows Personal Water Craft Freestyle Area. The main ferry and tour boat route passes through the centre of the open water in the centre of the river.

== Swan Estuary Marine Park ==
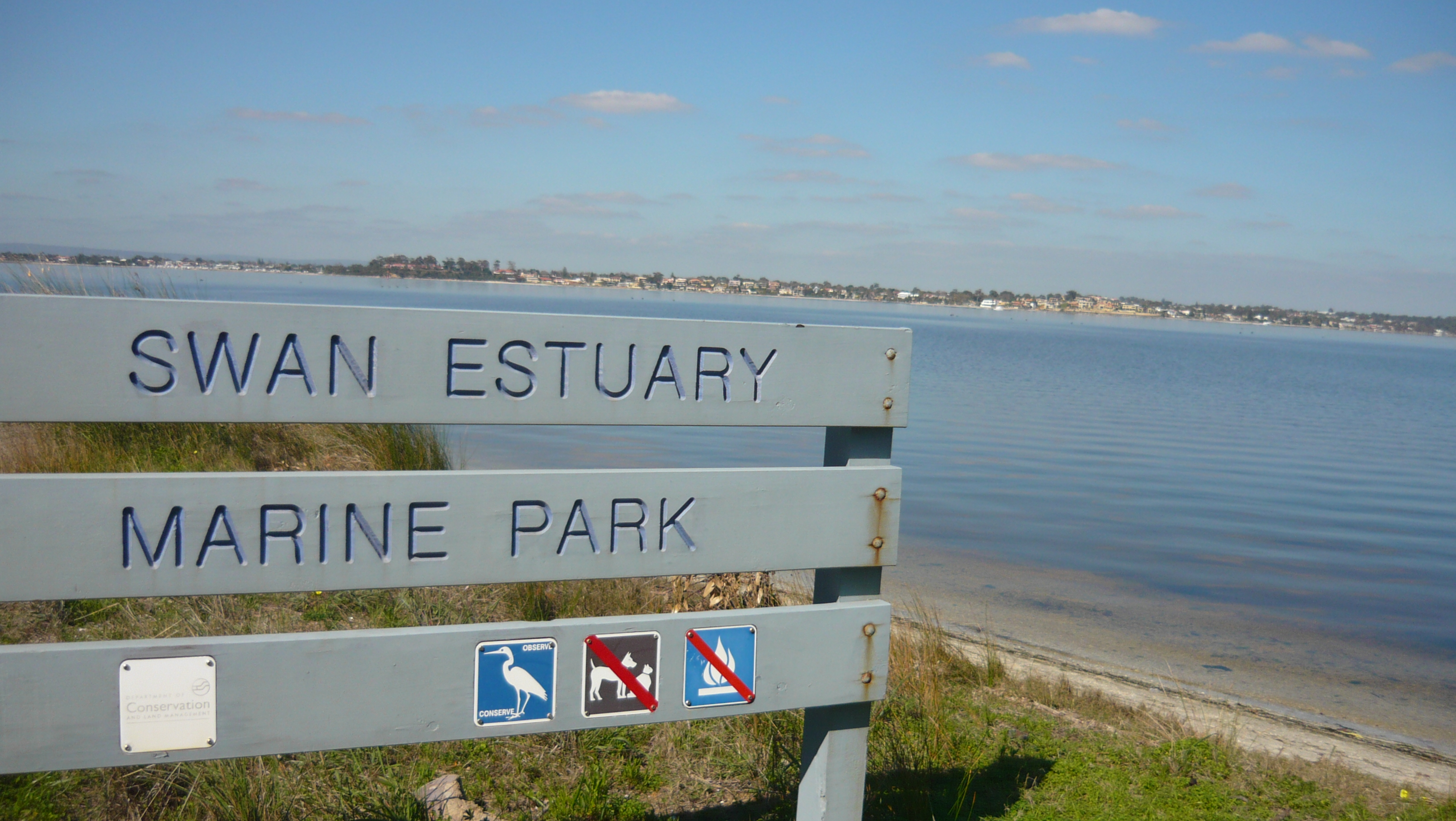
Swan Estuary Marine Park sign

The component marine parks occur in three locations within the bounds of Melville Water:

- Pelican Point Marine Park, south of Pelican Point, Crawley
- Milyu Marine Park, around Pelican Rocks, South Perth
- Alfred Cove Marine Park, Alfred Cove, Lucky Bay, Attadale

== See also ==
- Islands of Perth, Western Australia
