= Canning Bridge =

Bridge in Perth, Western Australia

Coordinates: 32°00′40″S 115°51′12″E

Designations

Western Australia Heritage Register
- Designated: 2 March 2012
- Reference no.: 16178

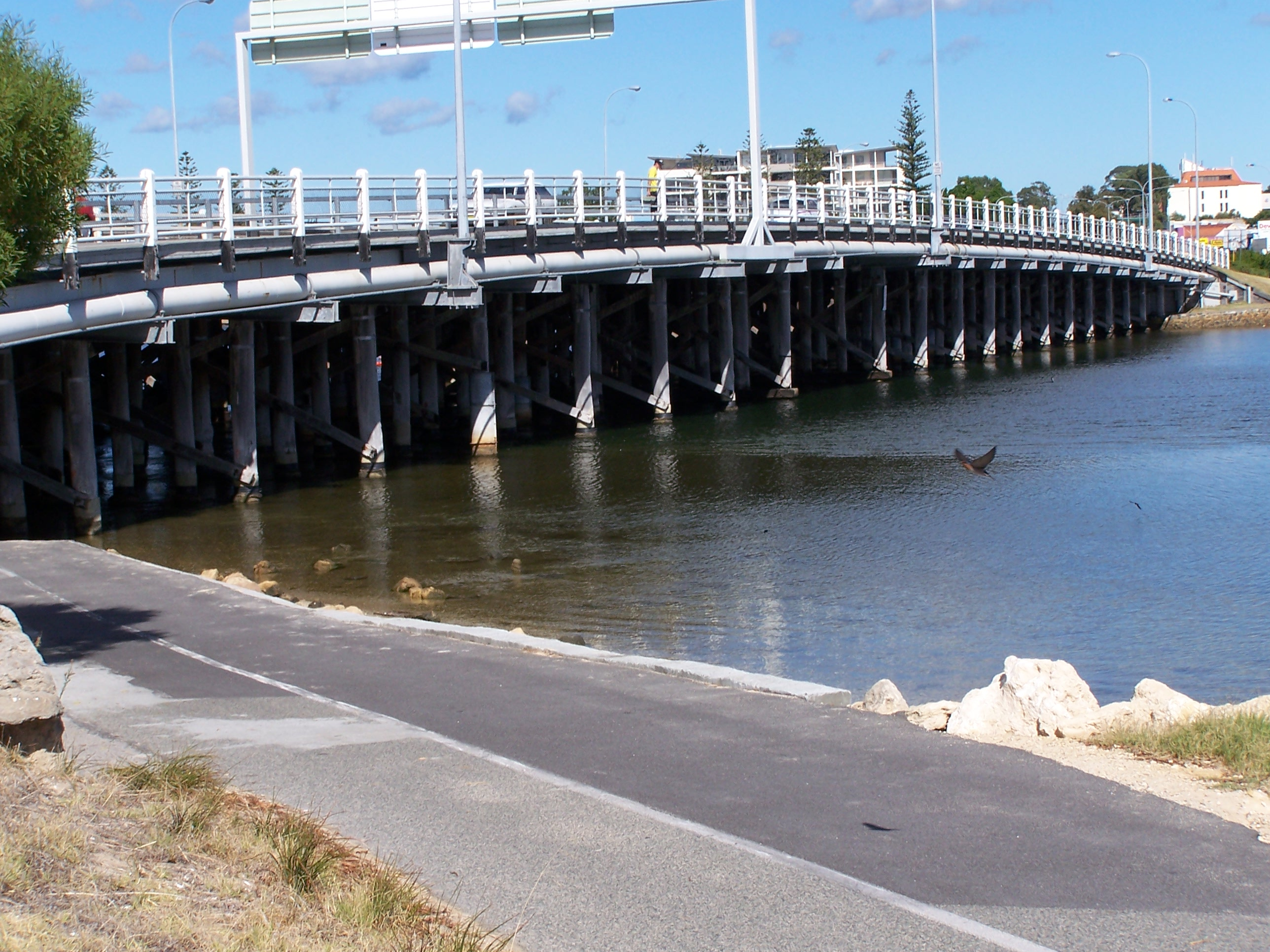
Canning Bridge from the eastern side of the Canning River

Canning Bridge is a traffic bridge which is the most downstream crossing of the Canning River in the city of Perth, Western Australia. The bridge is a part of Canning Highway, and connects the suburbs of Como and Applecross. The Canning River is approximately 100 metres (330 feet) wide at the crossing, (Note: Width estimated from 47th edition (2005) UBD Street Directory, Map 308.) the narrowest point of the river along its downstream stretch. It is located near Canning Bridge railway station.

== History ==
There have been four different structures at the present site.

=== First bridge: 1849 ===
The first bridge was designed in 1846 by Henry Trigg, then Superintendent of Public Works. The bridge as designed was 160 metres (520 ft) long and 3.7 metres (12 ft) wide. It had a central span of 7.3 metres (24 ft), and its deck sat just 2.4 metres (8 ft) above the river water.

Construction on the bridge was not commenced until 1849 because the original tenders were too costly. The bridge was built by Solomon Cook. The bridge served as a vital traffic link between Fremantle, Perth and Guildford.

=== Second bridge: 1867 ===
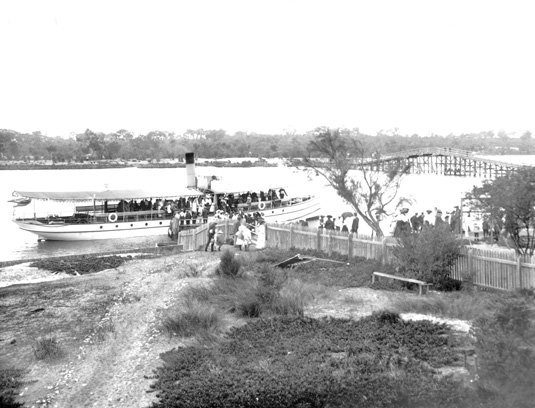
The Silver Star river steamer ferry at Coffee Point, Applecross with the second (1867) Canning Bridge in the background, c. 1906

Flooding in the Swan and Canning Rivers in 1862 damaged the Canning and Helena Bridges, as well as The Causeway. As a result, a new Canning Bridge was built in 1867 by convicts. This second bridge had a clearance of 3.7 metres (12 ft) above the river water; the bridge deck was raised to have a clearance of 5.5 metres (18 ft) in 1892.

=== Third bridge: 1908 ===
Due to poor maintenance, the second bridge slowly deteriorated. A fire damaged the structure, and since the road served as a critical traffic link, funding was provided for a new bridge in 1907 and 1908. The new bridge was built in 1908 at a cost of £2,023, and was a sturdier construction. It was located south east of the present bridge.

During the Great Depression, between 1930 and 1933, bushland on the eastern bank of the Canning River at Canning Bridge hosted many homeless families in bushland camps.

=== Current structure: 1938 ===
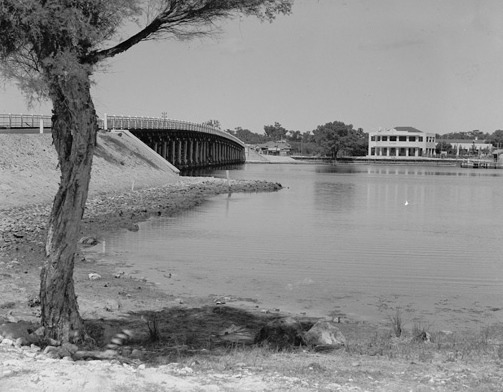
The 1938-bridge and Raffles Hotel, shortly after their construction

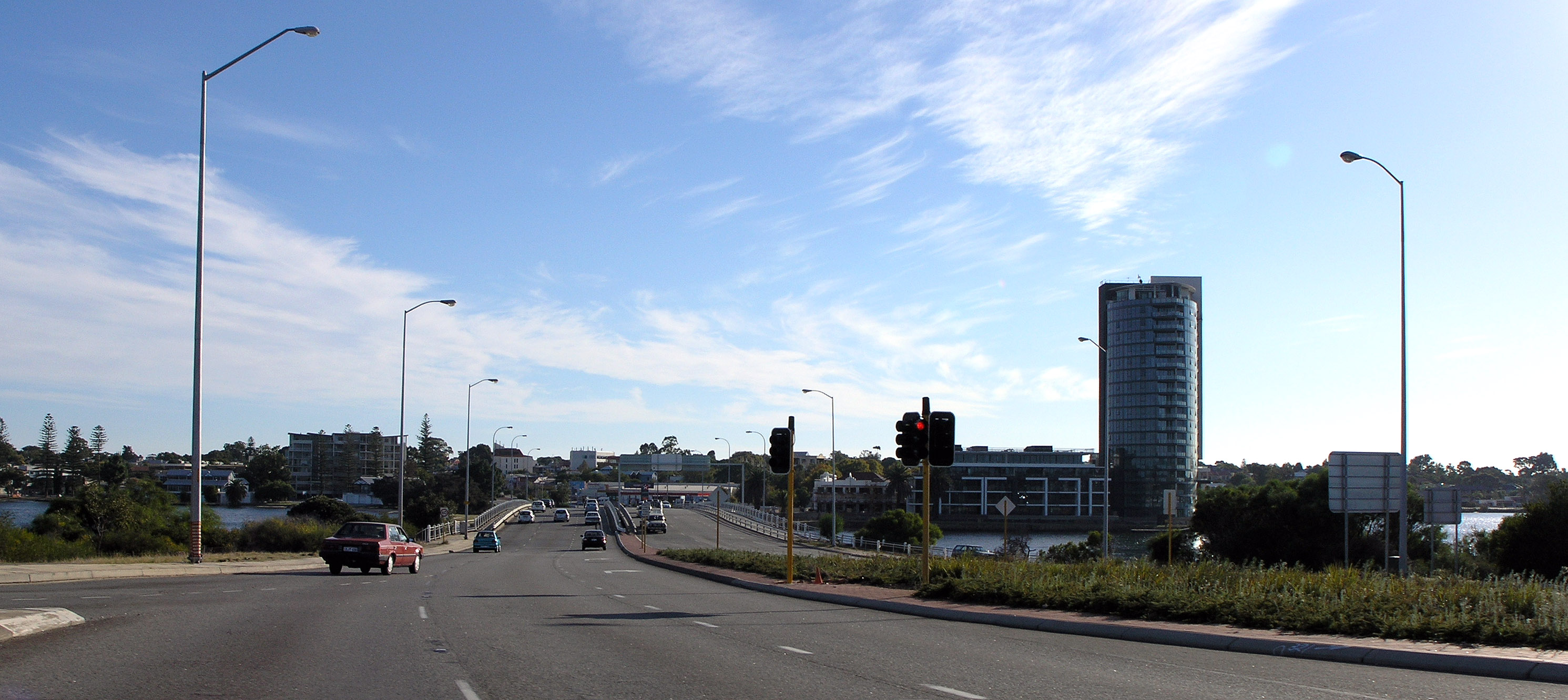
View west down Canning Highway towards Canning Bridge and tower built next to Raffles Hotel, 2006

Construction on a replacement for the third bridge began in July 1937. The new bridge, which cost £A 24,830, equivalent to A$2.51 million in 2022, was opened on 29 April 1938.

At the time of its opening it was a timber pile-driven bridge constructed of jarrah, karri and wandoo timber, comprising 24 spans of 6.1 metres (20 ft) and a central navigation span of 12 metres (40 ft), with a total length of 158.5 metres (520 ft).

Due to the outbreak of World War II, the third bridge was not immediately demolished, in case of damage to the new bridge by enemy attack. The third bridge was kept in place until the late 1940s.

The 1938 bridge remains standing today, however it has been extensively modified since it was first opened and only carries eastbound traffic on Canning Highway. In 1958, another pile-driven timber bridge was constructed alongside the existing 1938 bridge on its upstream (southern) side, effectively doubling the traffic capacity of the structure. This newer structure featured a fishing platform below, but in most other respects was very similar to the original carriageway.

In 1958, the 1938 (downstream) bridge was shortened on its eastern end by three spans to accommodate an on-ramp to the Kwinana Freeway. Between 1965 and 1966, both the downstream and upstream bridges were widened on their outer sides by an extra two piles, to give a total of eight piles per pier on each bridge. At this time, the fishing platform underneath the 1958 (upstream) bridge was also extended and modified.

In 1976, reinforced concrete overlay onto the 1938 (downstream) bridge's deck was completed, and the same was performed on the 1958 (upstream) bridge in 1984. The original karri timber halfcaps in the 1938 bridge's structure were replaced by steel in 1994–1995 due to termite damage. Other substructure repairs were also carried out at this time, and the eastern abutment of the 1958 bridge was reinforced with concrete.

In 1997, the reinforced concrete overlay on the bridge decks was replaced, and was expected to help lengthen the lifespan of the structure by 40 years. Further reinforced concrete was used in 1998–1999 to stop further damage to the bridge's superstructure.

== Raffles Hotel ==
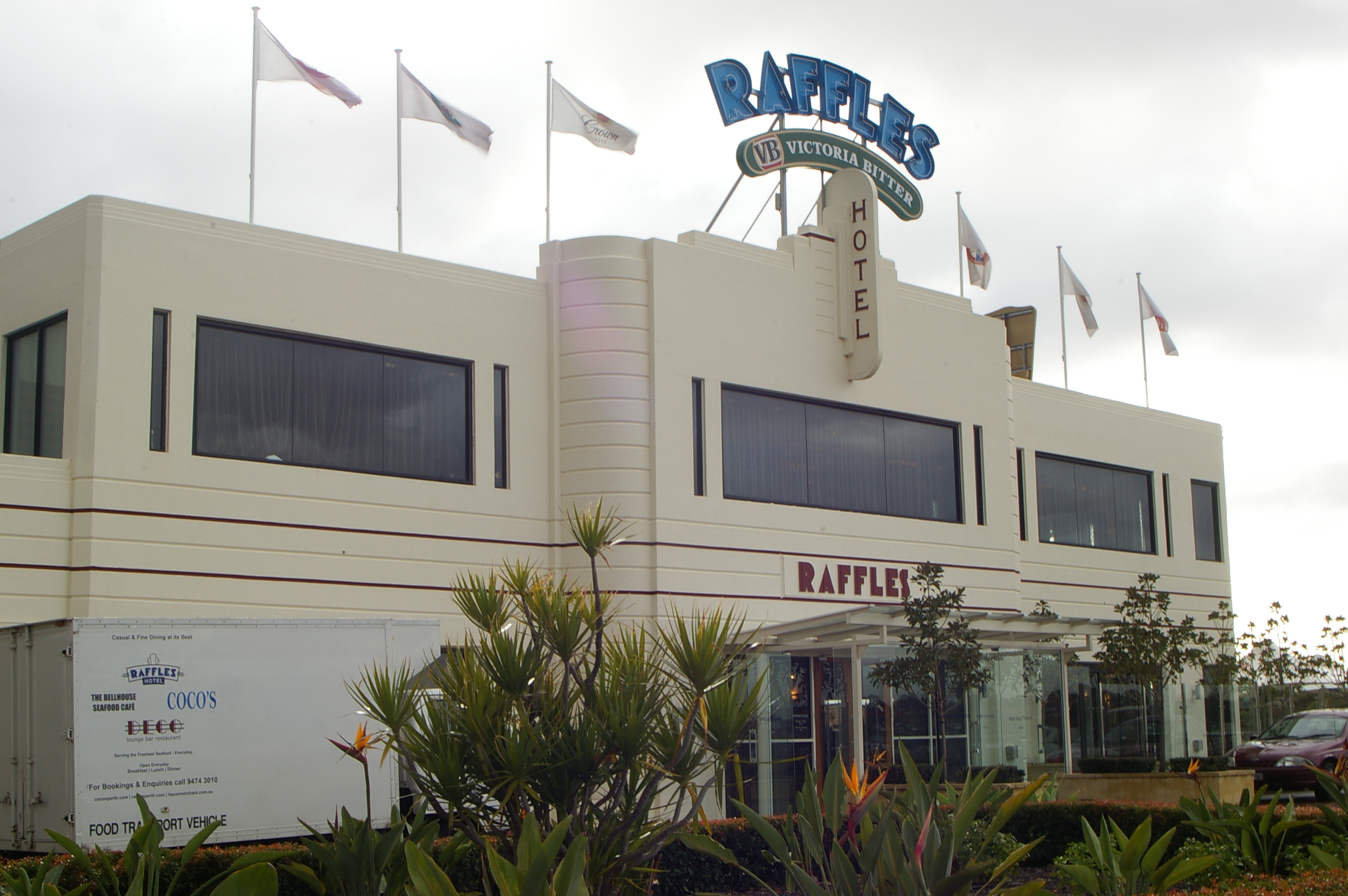
The Raffles Hotel

The location of Canning Bridge on the road from Fremantle to Perth and Guildford made it a suitable location for accommodation and refreshments. As a result, in 1896 the Canning Bridge Hotel was built near the bridge on its western (Applecross) side. This building was extensively upgraded in 1939 with a distinctive art-deco facade designed by architect William G. Bennett to coincide with the construction of the current bridge. The building was renamed the Raffles Hotel after the hotel of the same name in Singapore.

Apart from its status as "the epitome" of Perth's social scene in the 1940s and 1950s, the Raffles later became noted for its animated neon billboards advertising beer. During the 1970s and 1980s the Raffles was notable for its live music attracting the most popular local and interstate acts.

In 2002, the site was sold to construction company Multiplex, which proceeded to redevelop the site into a 17-storey apartment tower. As part of the planning permissions, the art-deco 1939 building was retained and renovated.

== Heritage status ==
In March 2012 the bridge attained status on the Western Australian State Heritage list.

== Sources ==
- Engineering Heritage Panel (July 2012). Swan & Canning Rivers Bridges (PDF). Australian Engineering Week Tour 2012. West Perth: Engineers Australia. Wikidata Q141891920. Archived from the original (PDF) on 16 March 2019.
  - Margetts, Lloyd (2012). "Canning Bridges". In Engineering Heritage Panel (2012), pp. 9–12.
