= Attadale, Western Australia =

Attadale
- Suburb
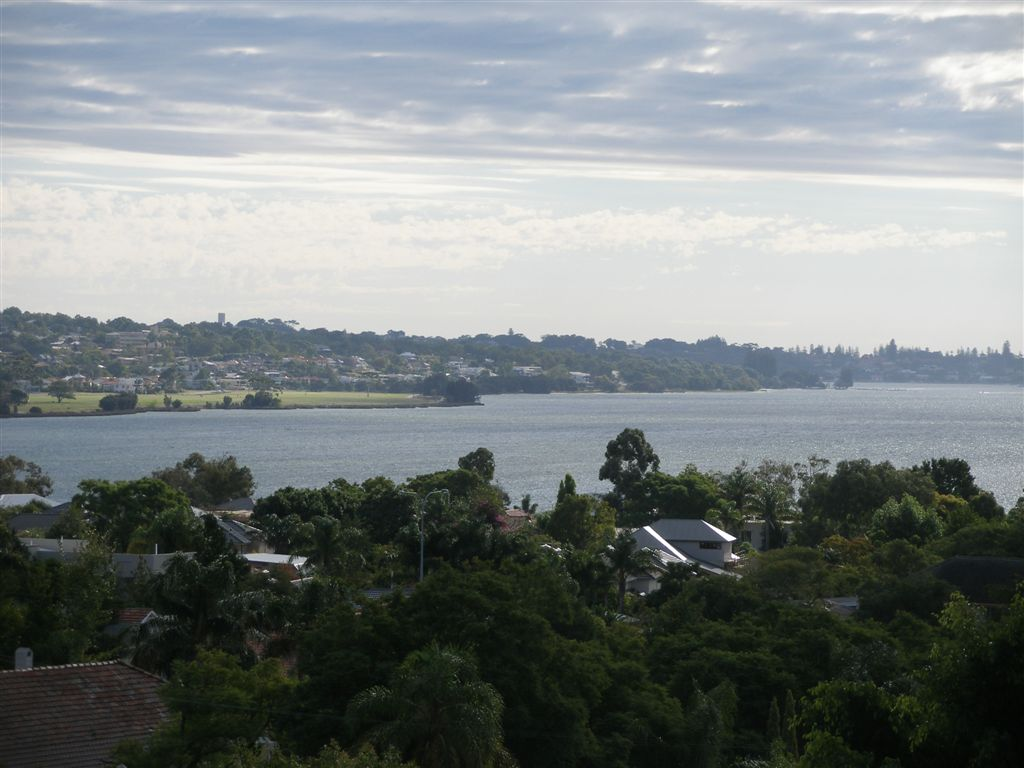
- Attadale, with Alfred Cove in foreground
- Interactive map of Attadale
- Coordinates: 32°01′31″S 115°48′08″E
- Country: Australia
- State: Western Australia
- City: Perth
- LGA: City of Melville
- Location: 9 km (5.6 mi) from Perth
- Established: 1896

Government
  - State electorate: Bicton
  - Federal division: Tangney

Population
  - Total: 6,638 (SAL 2021)
- Postcode: 6156
Suburbs around Attadale
Swan River	Swan River	Swan River
Bicton	Attadale	Swan River
Palmyra	Melville	Alfred Cove

Attadale is a riverside suburb of Perth, Western Australia, located within the City of Melville.

It was the first subdivision of A. P. Matheson's Melville Water Park Estate. Attadale was named after an estate in Scotland situated on the south side of Loch Carron.

The suburb is located between the central business district and Fremantle along the southern side of the Swan River. Its extensive foreshore has many open spaces for residents and visitors including a large public open space along Burke Drive where residents can take their dogs for recreational activities.

== Notable persons ==
- Peter Moylan, pitcher for the Atlanta Braves of Major League Baseball, is from Attadale.
- Brendan Nash, former Queensland state cricket player, now playing for the West Indies.
- Luke McPharlin, a key position player for the Fremantle Dockers, attended Attadale Primary School.
- Heath Ledger, actor, has lived in Attadale.
- Mitchell Marsh, cricketer who plays for the Australian national cricket team, Western Australia and Perth Scorchers.
- Shaun Marsh, cricketer who plays for the Australian national cricket team, Western Australia and Perth Scorchers.
- Alex Fasolo, former player for the Collingwood Football Club, nicknamed "Fazzy Boy"
- Aaron Younger, water polo player

== Education ==
Attadale contains three schools: Attadale Primary School, Santa Maria College and Mel Maria Catholic Primary School.

== Facilities ==
Attadale Tennis Club (also known as St Joseph Pignatelli Tennis Club) is a parish club providing tennis facilities (with six synthetic courts), and was located on the corner of Wichmann Road, and Galloway Street, although the tennis courts have since been demolished to make room for a new church.

== Transport ==
=== Bus ===
- 111 Fremantle Station to WACA Ground – serves Canning Highway
- 148 Fremantle Station to Como – serves Lutey Road, Moreing Road, Roberts Road, Wichmann Road, Hislop Road and Canning Highway
- 158 Fremantle Station to Elizabeth Quay Bus Station – serves Lutey Road, Moreing Road, Roberts Road, Wichmann Road, Hislop Road and Canning Highway
- 910 Fremantle Station to Perth Busport (high frequency) – serves Canning Highway
