= Applecross, Western Australia =

Applecross
- Suburb
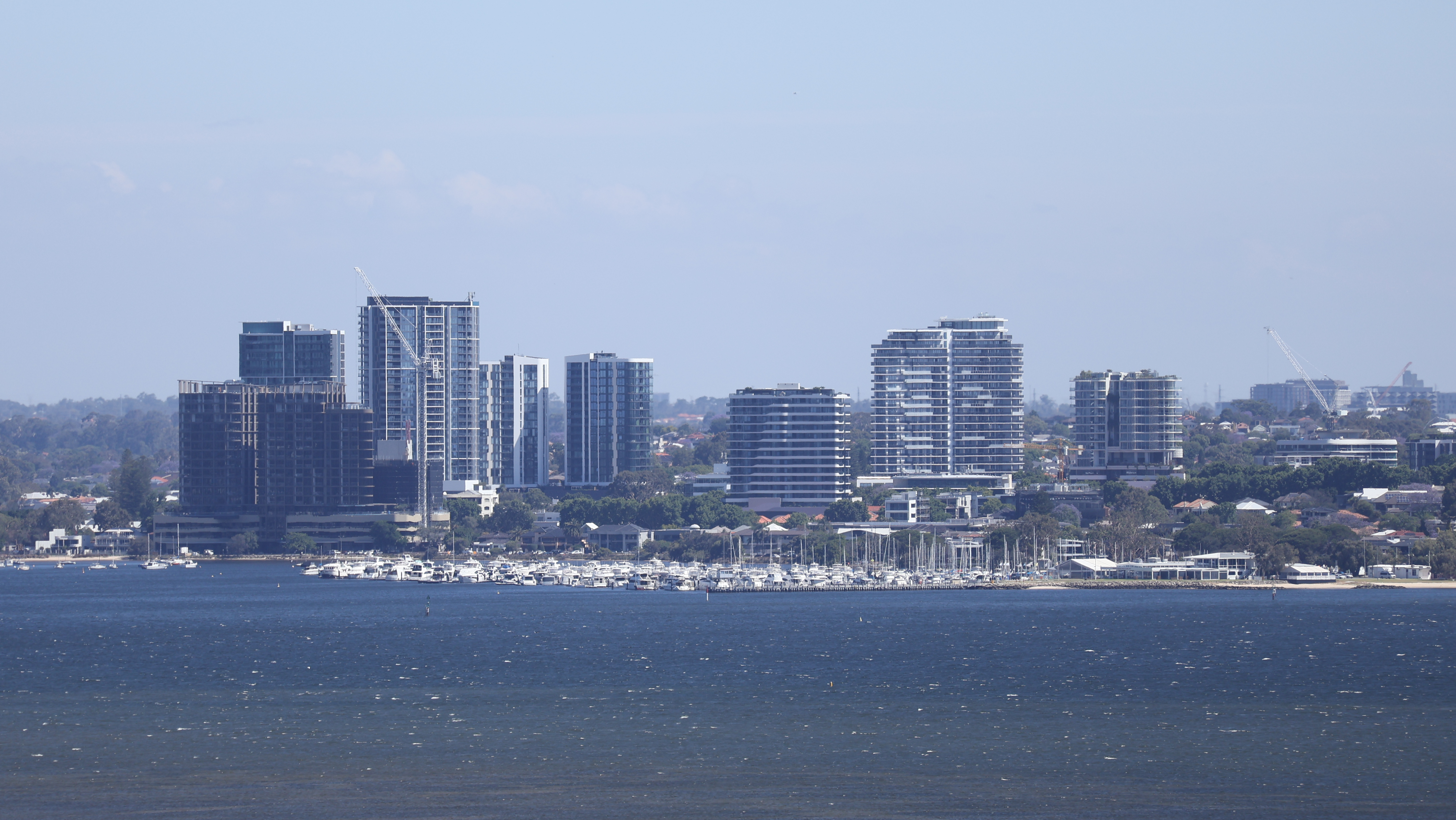
- Applecross viewed across the Swan River from Kings Park
- Interactive map of Applecross
- Coordinates: 32°00′49″S 115°50′12″E
- Country: Australia
- State: Western Australia
- City: Perth
- LGA: City of Melville
- Location: 7 km (4.3 mi) from Perth
- Established: 1896

Government
  - State electorate: Bateman
  - Federal division: Tangney

Population
  - Total: 7,228 (SAL 2021)
- Postcode: 6153
Suburbs around Applecross
Swan River	Swan River	Swan River
Swan River	Applecross	Swan River
Alfred Cove	Ardross	Mount Pleasant

Applecross is a riverside suburb of Perth, Western Australia, bounded by Canning Highway and the Swan River. It is located within the City of Melville.

As of 2025, several high-rise buildings are under construction in the eastern portion of the suburb, bringing their number to about a dozen, following similar developments in nearby South Perth. Until recently, the Raffles Waterfront Tower was the only high-rise building in the suburb.

== Name and early history ==
The suburb of Applecross takes its name from the Applecross peninsula in Wester Ross, Highland, on the northwest coast of Scotland. Many of the streets in the suburb have names from the area, including Carron, Gairloch, Ullapool, Kintail, Strome, Ardross, Alness, Kishorn, Glenelg, Duncraig, Dunvegan, Killian and Roskhill.

The suburb of Applecross was originally assigned to Lionel Lukin on 28 May 1830. The land was finally acquired by Alexander Matheson, second son of Sir Alexander Matheson, 1st Baronet of Lochalsh, in February 1896. Matheson formed the Western Australian Investment Company Limited and instigated and named the subdivision of the area.

Matheson developed the waterfront land as gentlemen's residences. He operated a ferry service to bring day-trippers to the area from Perth for picnics, tennis and sailing. The difficulty in finding reliable water stymied further development, and Matheson sold the land to the London and Australian Investment Company around 1903.

In 1925, Thomas Burke stopped at Fremantle on his return from England. He was persuaded to view the Applecross land held by the London and Australian Investment Company. Burke quickly realised the potential of the undeveloped land as an affordable, long-term investment for working Australians. He purchased 900 hectares (2,200 acres) between the Swan River (Western Australia) and along the Perth-Fremantle Road (the precursor to Canning Highway) from Canning Bridge, Applecross, and towards Point Walter.

For the next ten years, Burke bundled the land as 1,000-square-metre (0.25-acre) blocks and sold them in estates: Applecross Estate, Kintail Road Estate, Canningview Estate, Ardross Park Estate, Wireless Station Estate, Rivermount Estate, Radio Park Estate, Melville Park Estate, and Lucky Bay View Estate. Some buyers built on their block. Others took Burke's advice and gambled it would increase in value significantly with the forthcoming establishment of better road connections with Perth via Canning Bridge. By 1960, the year after the opening of the Narrows Bridge (Perth), a block in the Kintail Road Estate purchased for £A 45 in 1940, equivalent to A$4,286 in 2022, returned £A 1,750, equivalent to A$58,242 in 2022.

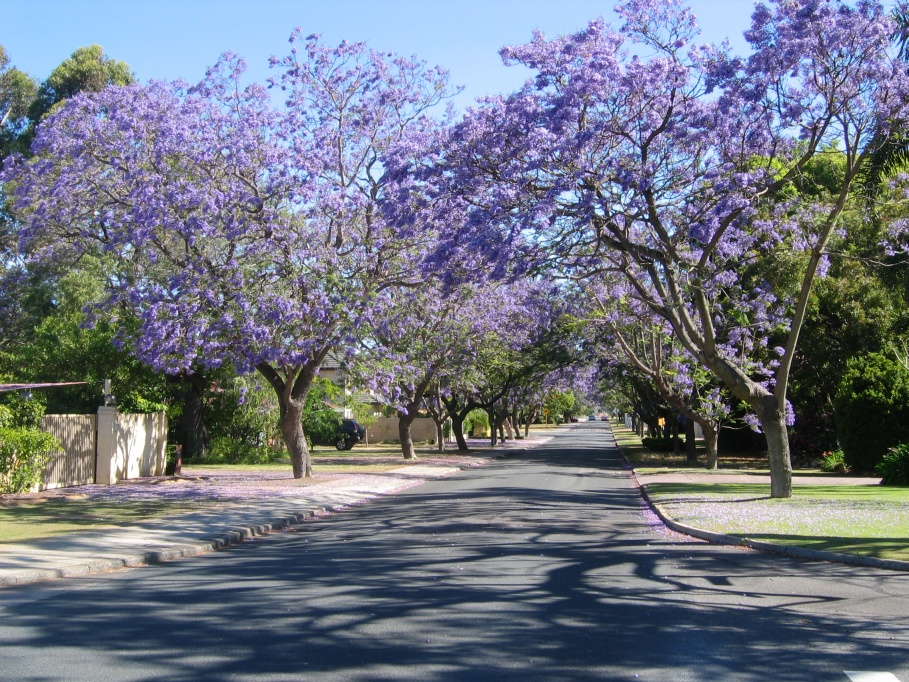
Jacarandas in Applecross

A distinguishing feature of the suburb are the jacaranda trees that line its streets and flower in the late spring. Planting of these and other exotic trees along the streets began in 1935. In keeping with this theme, Applecross is home to an annual Jacaranda festival in late November.

=== World War II ===
In 1940, Applecross was the location of a "Patriotic Grand Prix", a once only usage of the streets of the suburb for a car race known at the time as a Round-the-houses race.

== Landmarks ==
A number of well known landmarks and facilities are in Applecross. These include:

- Raffles complex (Note: The Raffles complex comprises Raffles Hotel and apartments at Coffee Point.)
- South of Perth Yacht Club
- The former Heathcote Hospital (Note: Used for mental health services from 1929 to 1994. Now used as a community recreation facility. Point Heathcote was named after Midshipman George Gage Heathcote. Captain James Stirling landed at the location in his 1827 expedition up the Swan River, and the site was considered by Stirling as an alternative to the Perth site when establishing the Swan River Colony in 1829.)
- Waylen Bay
- Canning Bridge

== Notable residents ==
- Joel Creasey, comedian
- Adele Horin (1951–2015), journalist
- Glen Jakovich, West Coast Eagles footballer
- Josephine Langford, actress
- Katherine Langford, actress
- Heath Ledger (1979–2008), actor
- Shaun Marsh, cricketer
- Pogo, electronic musician

== Transport ==
=== Bus ===
- 148 Como to Fremantle Station – serves Kintail Road, Matheson Road, Riseley Street and Canning Highway
- 158 Elizabeth Quay Bus Station to Fremantle Station – serves Kintail Road, Matheson Road, Riseley Street and Canning Highway

Bus routes serving Canning Highway:

- 111 and 160 WACA Ground to Fremantle Station
- 114 Elizabeth Quay Bus Station to Lake Coogee
- 115 Elizabeth Quay Bus Station to Hamilton Hill Memorial Hall
- 910 Perth Busport to Fremantle Station (high frequency)
