= Canning River Regional Park =

Regional park in Perth, Western Australia

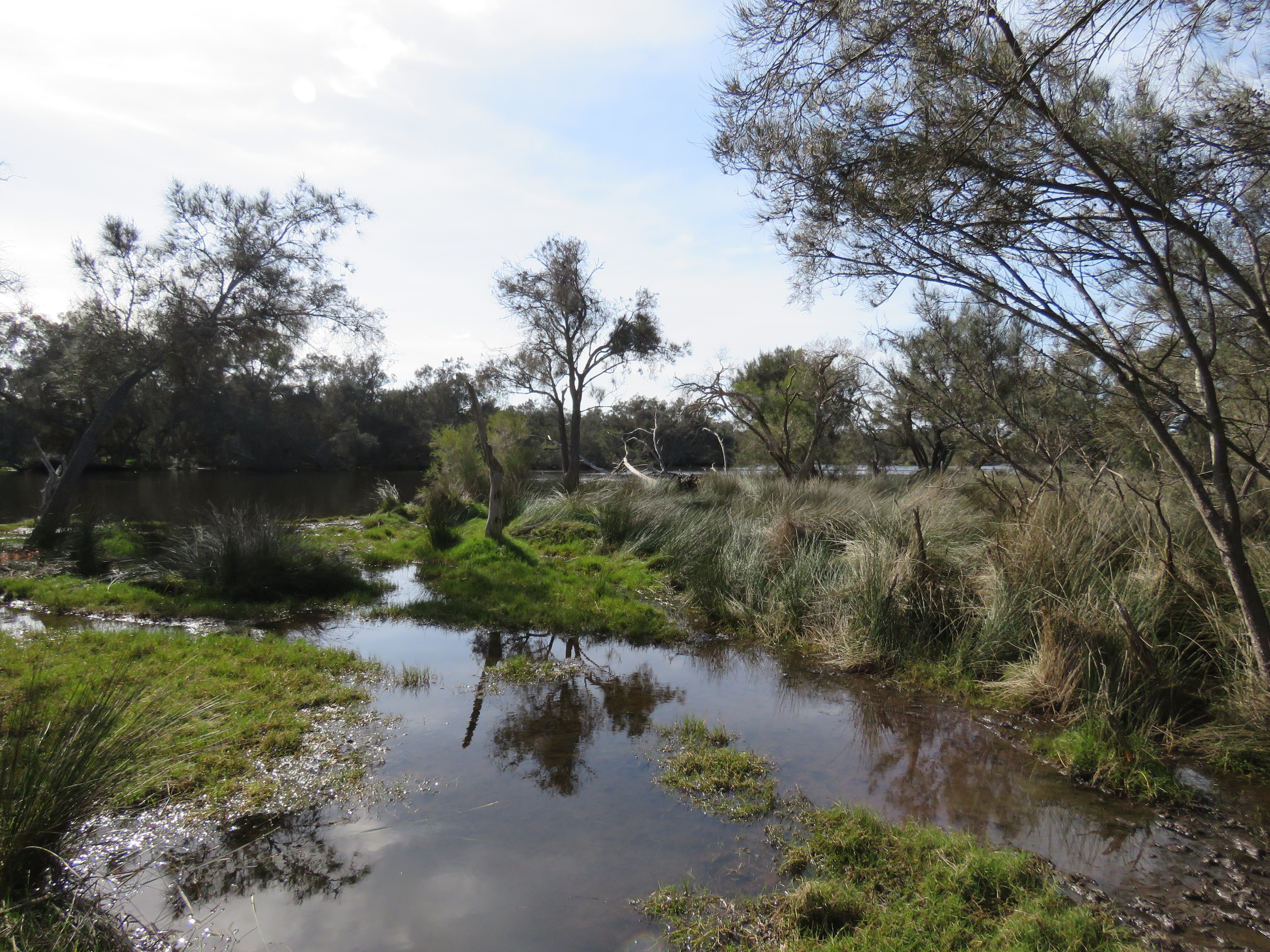
- The Canning River and surrounding wetlands in the regional park

- Location within Perth
- Canning River Regional Park (●) extends for roughly 6 kilometres (3.7 mi) along both sides of the Canning River.
- Type: Regional park
- Location: Perth, Western Australia
- Coordinates: 32°01′41″S 115°54′58″E
- Area: 266 ha (660 acres)
- Website: exploreparks.dbca.wa.gov.au/park/canning-river-regional-park

The Canning River Regional Park is the largest of eight regional parks within the Perth metropolitan area. The park covers approximately 6 kilometres (3.7 mi) on both sides of the Canning River between the bridges carrying Nicholson Road and Leach Highway over the Canning River. Canning River is a major tributary of the Swan River in south western Western Australia.

== History ==
=== Aboriginal history ===
At the time of European settlement, the Swan and Canning basins supported a population of Aboriginal people, the Whadjuk. At least six family groups are thought to have claimed territorial rights to the land which is now the metropolitan area.

=== European history ===
The regional park encompasses an area which was once a significant river system and transport route during the colonisation of Perth. At that time, the area was used primarily to transport logs from further south to the Swan River and then Perth and Fremantle.

Over the years, land use in the area has included farms, orchids, brickworks, market gardens, a timber mill, recreation and a Sikh cremation site. More recently parts have been used for rubbish disposal, a museum and stock-holding area.

== Flora ==
Canning River Regional Park sits upon Bassendean sands.

== Facilities and attractions ==
Canning River Regional Park Recreational Areas; DEC

Access throughout the park is offered by either dual use paths or walk tracks, with the emphasis being on the enjoyment of the surrounding nature. Four marked interpretive walk trails traverse the park:

- Butterflies, Birds and Bridges Loop
- Woodloes Walk
- Banksia Hill Loop
- Lagoon to Living Streams

The local council (the City of Canning) and the Department of Environment and Conservation (DEC) are responsible for providing well designed recreation areas without detracting from the natural values of the park.

Vehicle access is provided for formal parking and emergency services. The park may also be accessed by pedestrians, bicycles, boats, canoes and wheel chairs.

Uncontrolled vehicle and pedestrian access has severely degraded some areas.

=== Kent Street Weir and Wilson Park ===
Kayak paddling into the overflow of Kent Street Weir

This area of the park has by far the most developed parking, toilet, boating and canoe access as well as picnic facilities (including barbecues) of the park. There is also an eco centre that houses historical and ecological information, as well as being the location for environmentally focused educational activities. The river can be crossed via the pedestrian bridges Kent Street Weir Bridge and Greenfield Street Bridge, providing access to large areas of the park.

Each year, Western Australia Day is an open day at the park, with exhibits, children's activities, animals, guided walks in the regional park and Western Australia Day commemoration. Many of these activities are free for all to enjoy.

=== Leisure activities ===
Every Saturday at 8 am, a free 5-kilometre (3.1 mi) timed run takes place at Canning River Regional Park. The event is known as Canning River parkrun.

=== Castledare Miniature Railway ===
Castledare has extensive facilities, including over a 5-kilometre (3.1 mi) track, railway station, signal box, turn table, storage sheds and workshops. There are toilets, a kiosk, and limited picnic facilities. "Run days" are usually on the first and third Sundays of the month and during school holidays.

=== Mason's Landing ===
This area has toilets, boat and canoe access, as well as playground equipment and picnic facilities. Parking is provided along Duff Road.

=== Riverton Bridge Reserve ===
Formal parking, kiosk, toilets, boat and canoe access, as well as picnic facilities are provided here.

=== Ferndale Flats ===
Formal car park and open space are provided here.

=== Greenfield Street Bridge ===
This area has formal parking on the southern side of Greenfield Street Bridge. It is less than 700 metres (2,297 ft) from the Westfield Carousel shopping centre across the bridge.

=== Adenia Reserve ===
Adenia Reserve is a large parkland area, approximately 700 metres (2,297 ft) from the Stockland Riverton shopping centre and the Riverton Leisureplex. While no formal parking areas are provided, there is ample room to park on Adenia Road. Bicycle and pedestrian access to the rest of the park is via the pedestrian bridge across Bannister Creek connecting the western and eastern portions of Adenia Road, and then via Bursaria Crescent and Ferndale Crescent across Lambertia Creek. The Australian Sikh Heritage Trail is located at Adenia Reserve.

== Maintenance and conservation ==
Both City of Canning and DEC are responsible for sections of the park, and are responsible for maintaining the facilities and infrastructure in the area.

In order to maintain and restore the environmental values of the park, activities including weeding and re-vegetation (and hand watering during summer) are not only carried out by paid labour, but by volunteer groups. Much of the work done in the park is by the Canning River Regional Park Volunteers consisting mostly of locals of all ages. The volunteer group's aims are to promote the Canning River Regional Park as a place of conservation and passive recreation, and to carry out activities which enhance the natural values of the area.

Many projects are ongoing to transform the degraded sections of the park by the reintroduction of native species and providing public access in a safe and sustainable manner. Where necessary, funding for materials is often obtained through community grants from organisations such as Lotterywest, as well as corporate programs such as Alcoa.

== Arson ==
The Canning River Regional Park is often attacked by arsonists; these attacks have become a growing problem not just for the park itself but the whole of Perth. The Arson Reward Scheme by the Arson Task Force offers informants rewards of up to A$25,000 for information leading to the conviction of arsonists.

== See also ==
- Canning Dam
