= Alfred Cove, Western Australia =

Alfred Cove
- Suburb
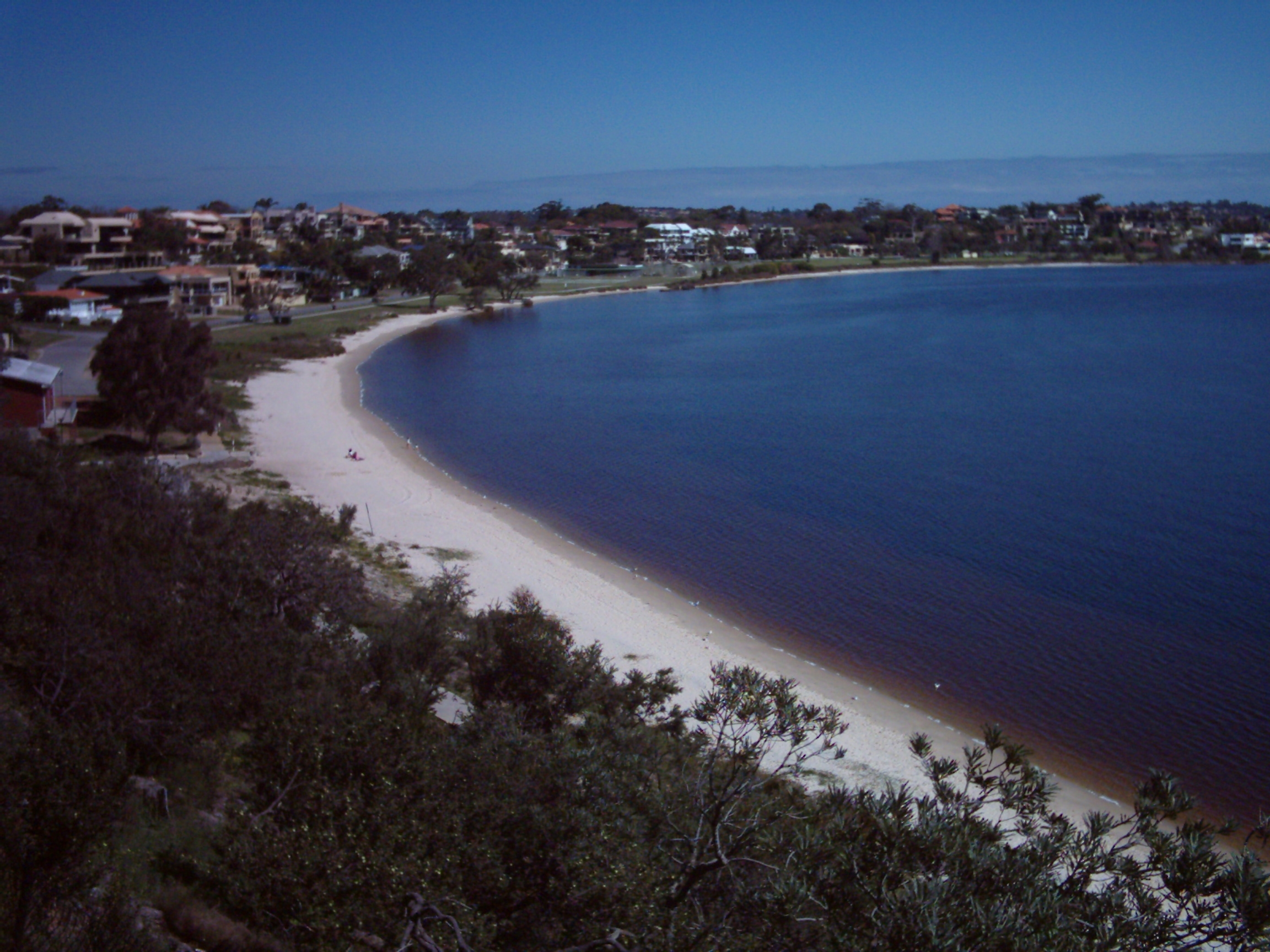
- Waylen Bay on the Swan River, Applecross
- Interactive map of Alfred Cove
- Coordinates: 32°01′58″S 115°49′01″E
- Country: Australia
- State: Western Australia
- City: Perth
- LGA: City of Melville
- Location: 13 km (8.1 mi) from Perth

Government
  - State electorate: Bateman / Bicton
  - Federal division: Tangney

Area
  - Total: 1.2 km^{2} (0.46 sq mi)

Population
  - Total: 2,830 (SAL 2021)
- Postcode: 6154
Suburbs around Alfred Cove
Attadale	Swan River	Applecross
Melville	Alfred Cove	Ardross
Melville	Myaree	Booragoon

Alfred Cove is a southern suburb of Perth, Western Australia. Its local government area is the City of Melville.

== History ==
It is named after the adjacent sheltered cove in the Swan River, which is in turn named after Alfred Waylen who was born at Point Walter in 1833 and who was granted Swan Location 74, covering most of present-day Alfred Cove and Myaree.

The suburb contains Tompkins Park, Bill Sweet Park and Sid Eaton Reserve.

As of 2021, Alfred Cove had a population of 2,830.

== Wildlife ==
The suburb is home to a variety of migrant and native species of birds and animals as the hinterland offers a comfortable habitat including the mudflats, seagrass beds and intertidal vegetation. Some of the migratory wading birds come from as far as Siberia, Mongolia and Asia and many of these species are protected under international agreements.

== Transport ==
=== Bus ===
- 160 Fremantle Station to WACA Ground – serves Kitchener Road and Norma Road

Bus routes serving Canning Highway:

- 111 Fremantle Station to WACA Ground
- 148 Fremantle Station to Como
- 158 Fremantle Station to Elizabeth Quay Bus Station
- 910 Fremantle Station to Perth Busport (high frequency)

== See also ==
- Electoral district of Alfred Cove
