= Point Heathcote =

Feature on Swan River, in Western Australia,

Point Heathcote Goolugatup (Nyungar)
- Headland
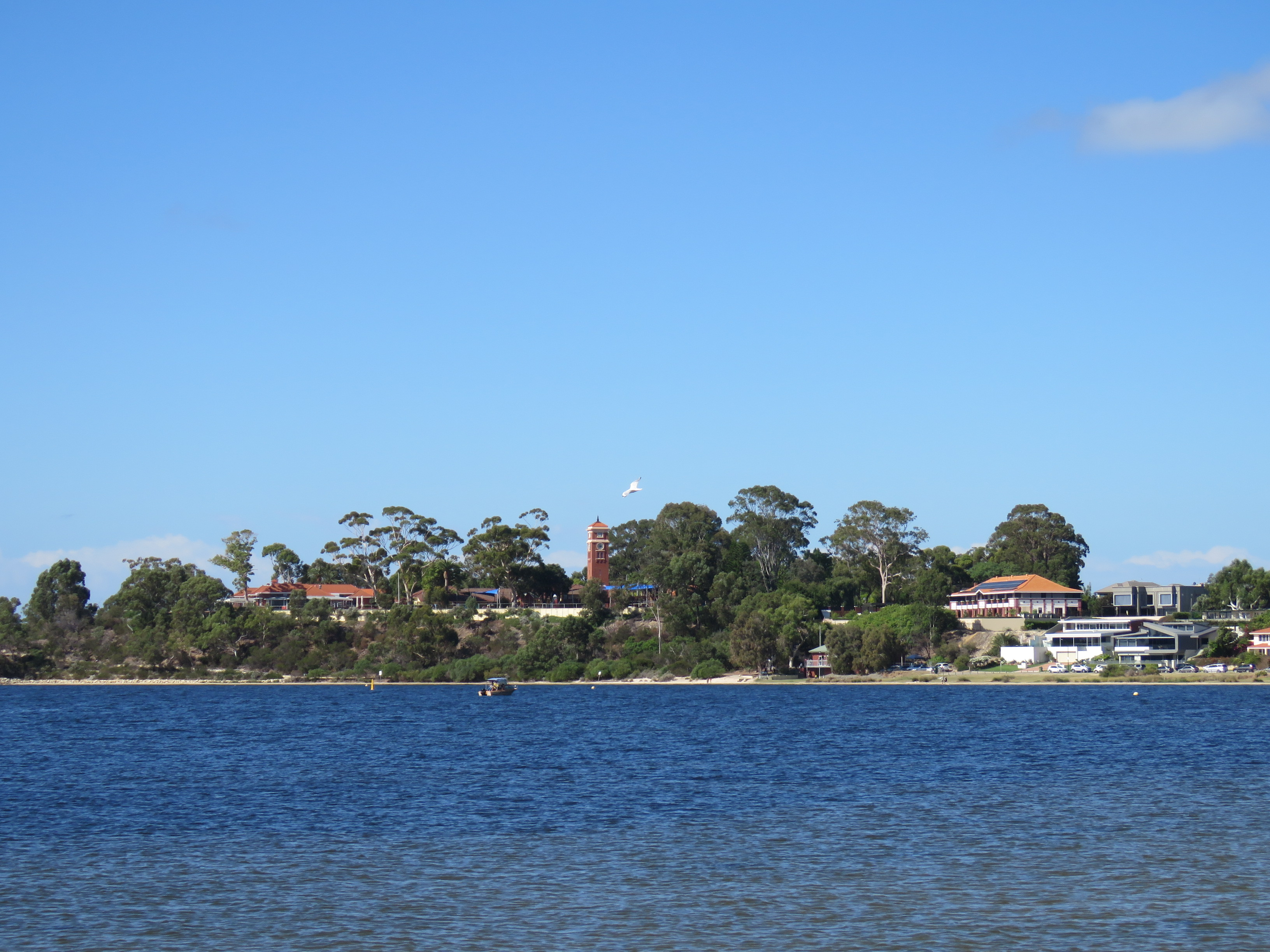
- Interactive map of Point Heathcote
- Coordinates: 32°00′08″S 115°50′32″E
- Location: Applecross, Western Australia
- Water bodies: Swan River

Point Heathcote (Nyungar: Goolugatup) is a geographic feature located on the south east part of Melville Water on Swan River. It is located in Applecross, a suburb of Perth, Western Australia.

== History ==
The area was named after George Gage Heathcote, son of Admiral Sir Henry Heathcote, a midshipman on HMS Success, who is said to have been the first European to land there. It was one of the landing and camp sites of Captain James Stirling during his exploration of the Swan River in April 1827. Point Heathcote was considered as a site for the capital city by Stirling, before he selected its current position.

Prior to European settlement, the area was known to the Noongar indigenous people as Goolugatup. It was a permanent camping area, and also used for initiation ceremonies.

== Hospital ==
Heathcote Hospital
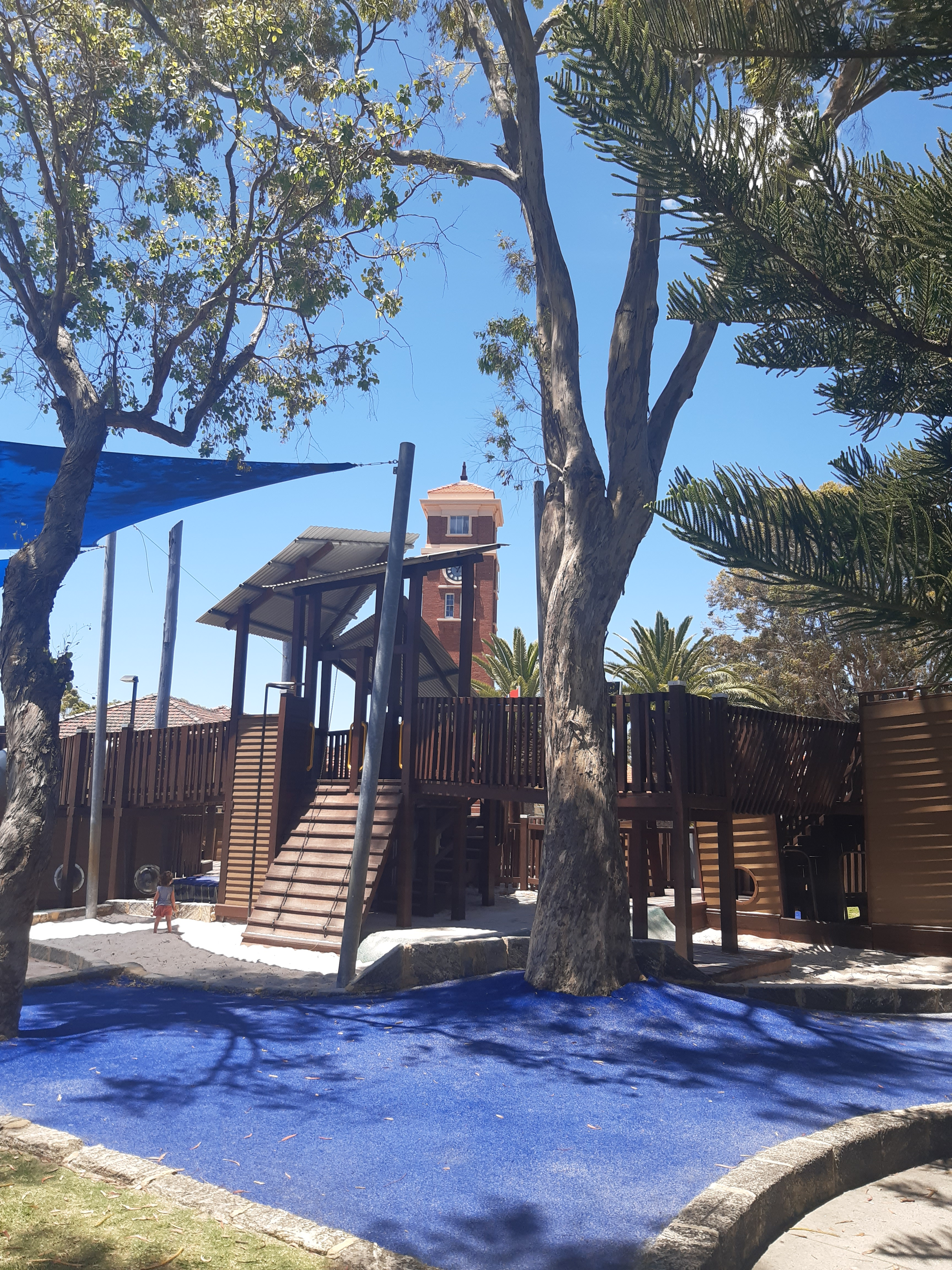
- The Pirate Playground at the site of the former Heathcote Hospital

Geography
- Location: Applecross, Western Australia, Australia
- Coordinates: 32°00′14″S 115°50′36″E

History
- Opened: 22 February 1929; 97 years ago
- Closed: 1994; 32 years ago

Links
- Lists: Hospitals in Australia

Western Australia Heritage Register
- Official name: Heathcote Hospital Precinct
- Type: State Registered Place
- Designated: 14 June 2021
- Reference no.: 3289

Point Heathcote was the site of the Point Heathcote Mental Reception Home, later known as Heathcote Hospital, for the treatment of patients with mental illness. The buildings were designed under the supervision of William Hardwick, who at the time was Principal Architect of the Public Works Department in Western Australia. The need for a new facility arose due to over-crowding conditions at Claremont Mental Hospital. Following a report on the inadequacies of facilities at Claremont in 1924, a 9.3-hectare (23-acre) site was purchased from the Catholic Church at Point Heathcote.

The Point Heathcote Mental Reception Home was constructed as a "home for the reception of recoverable patients, and not for senile, epileptic, or mentally deficient patients". It provided accommodation for 38 male and 38 female patients, in two separate wards with a central administration block connected to the wards by covered walkways. A two-storey accommodation building, housing 36 nurses, was also constructed on the western portion of the site. In 1928, a 22.9-metre (75 ft) water tower/clock tower was designed by the then Principal Architect, John Tait. Point Heathcote Mental Reception Home was completed by early 1929 at a final cost of £A 55,675, equivalent to A$4.95 million in 2022. The Lieutenant Governor, Robert McMillan, officially opened the centre on 22 February 1929.

In 1940, a new treatment block called Swan House was constructed on the site, accommodating a further 26 patients. It was designed by the Government Architect, Albert Ernest (Paddy) Clare and constructed at a cost of £A 15,000, equivalent to A$1.43 million in 2022.

By 1994, the function as a hospital had ceased, and various ideas were put forward for the site. In 2000, the hospital and grounds were designated a heritage precinct. The land, together with the heritage buildings, is also protected by the heritage agreement, which is registered as a memorial on the land title.

== See also ==
- Waylen Bay
