= Canning River =

River in Perth, Western Australia

Canning River Nyungar: Djarlgarra
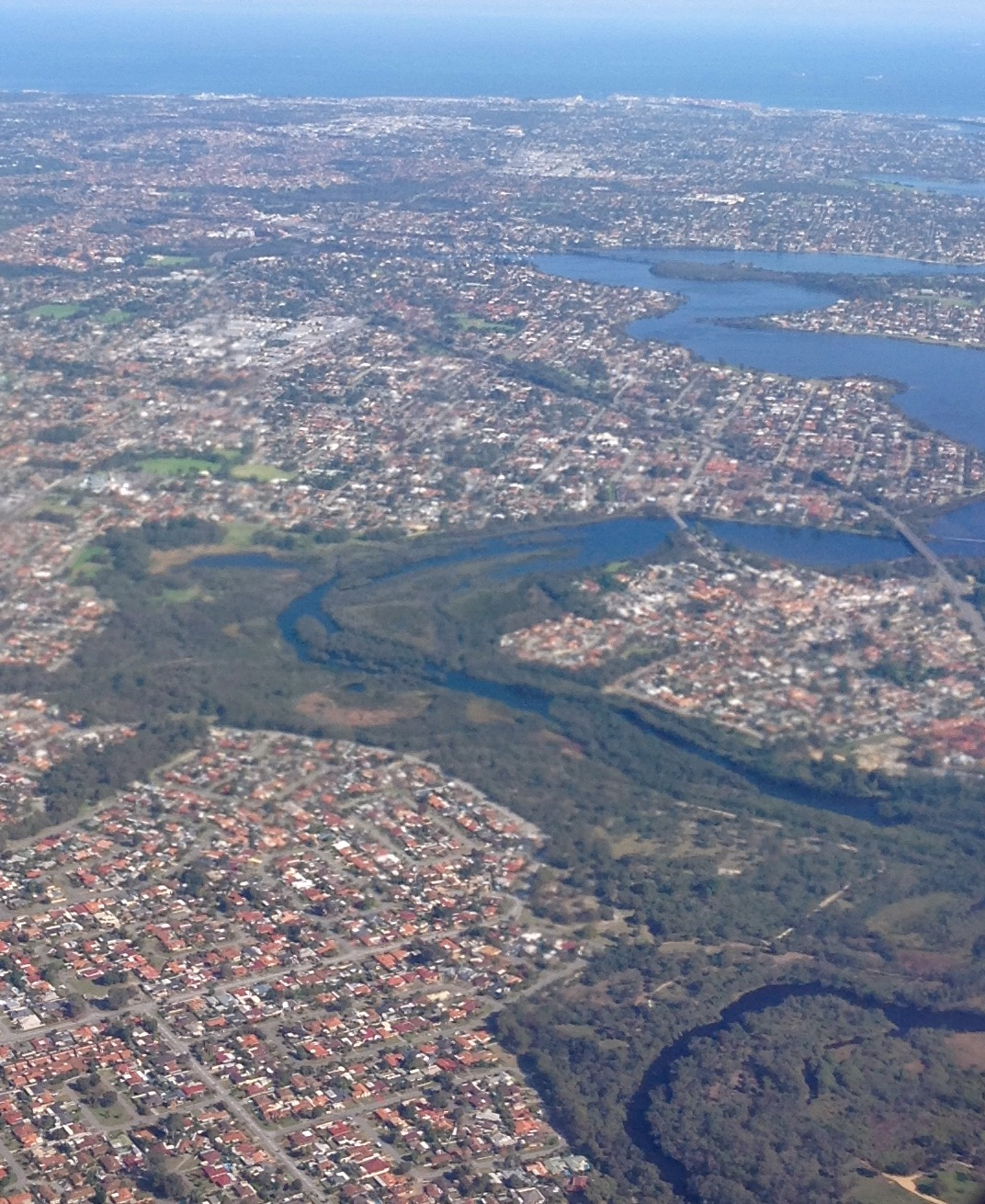
- Aerial photograph of the Canning River looking west towards the Indian Ocean

Location
- Country: Australia
- State: Western Australia
- City: Perth

Physical characteristics
- Source
  - location: Wandering
- Mouth: Swan River
  - location: Melville Water
  - coordinates: 32°00′11″S 115°51′02″E
- Length: 110 km (68 mi)

Basin features
- Tributaries
  - left: Bull Creek, Bannister Creek, Lambertia Creek, Southern River, Churchmans Brook
  - right: Yule Brook, Bickley Brook, Ellis Brook, Stoney Brook, Stinton Creek

The Canning River (Nyungar: Djarlgarra or Nyungar: Dyarlgarro) is a major river in southwest Australia, running 110 kilometres (68 mi). Its lower reaches run through the metropolitan area of Perth, the capital of Western Australia.

The Canning River intersects with the larger Swan River at Melville Water to form the Swan-Canning Estuary, although by convention the estuary is often viewed as part of the Swan (itself a continuation of the Avon River). The Canning rises near Wandering and flows through the Darling Scarp. It is dammed at the Canning Dam in Ashendon and the Kent Street Weir in Cannington. The river and foreshore are managed by the Western Australian state government as part of the Swan Canning Riverpark.

== Source and route ==
With headwaters on the Darling Scarp, the Canning meanders through suburbs of Perth on the Swan Coastal Plain, including Cannington, Thornlie, Riverton, Shelley, Rossmoyne and Mount Pleasant, before joining the Swan at Melville Water just downstream of the Canning Bridge.

Technical sources regard the Swan–Avon and Canning as separate rivers flowing into a single body of water, the Swan–Canning Estuary, at Melville Water, rather than treating the Canning as a tributary of the Swan. This distinction was noted as early as 1827 by James Stirling.

== Bridges ==
- Canning Bridge
- Mount Henry Bridge
- Shelley Bridge
- Riverton Bridge
- Kent Street Weir Bridge
- Greenfield Street Bridge
- Canning River Downstream Bridge
- Canning River Upstream Bridge
- Djarlgarra Bridge Easthbound
- Djarlgarra Bridge Westbound
- unnamed railway bridge
- Royal Street Bridge
- unnamed pedestrian bridge
- Burslem Bridge
- unnamed railway bridge
- Jenna Biddi Footbridge
- unnamed railway bridge
- unnamed pedestrian bridge
- Cargeeg Bridge
- unnamed road bridge
- Manning Road Footbridge
Canning Bridge from northwest

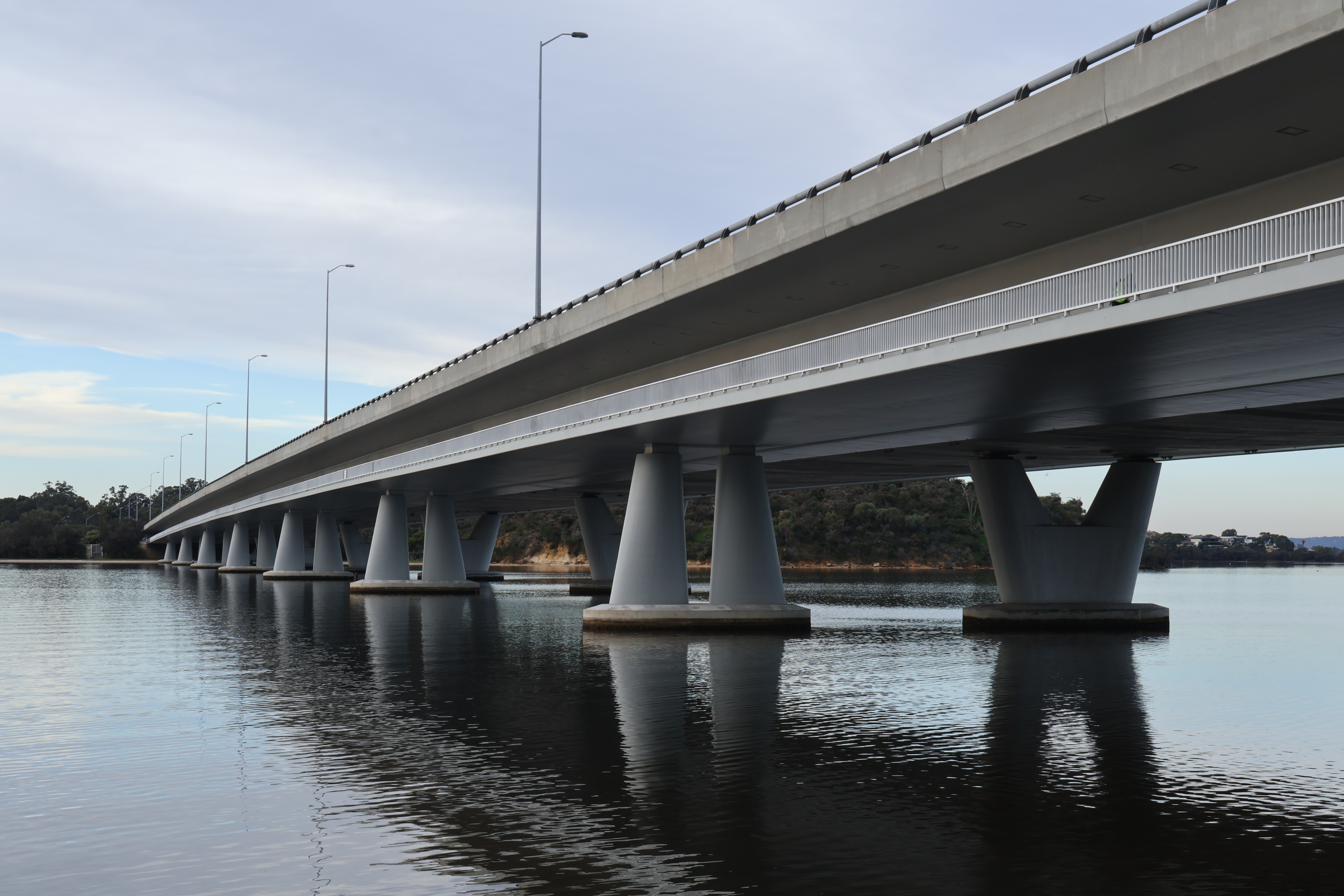
Downstream side of Mount Henry Bridge

Shelley Bridge from south

Riverton Bridge from north, with dolphins in front

== Points ==
- Coffee Point (east of Point Heathcote on the Swan River)
- Deepwater Point (on western shore in Mount Pleasant)
- Salter Point (very narrow part of river between Salter Point suburb on north side, Rossmoyne/Shelley border on south)
- Prisoner Point (south shore in Shelley suburb, east of Shelley Beach)
- Wadjup Point (north west of Shelley Bridge)

== History ==
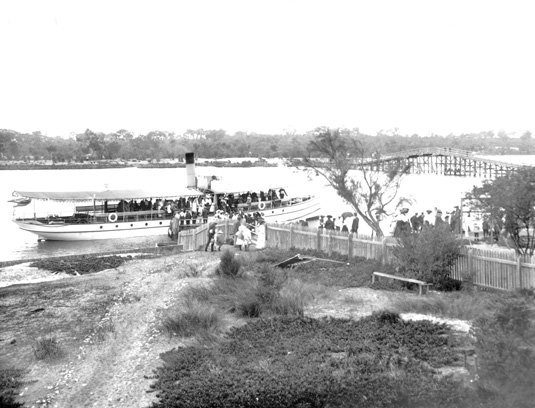
Passengers disembarking Silver Star ferry at Coffee Point, Canning Bridge in background, c. 1906

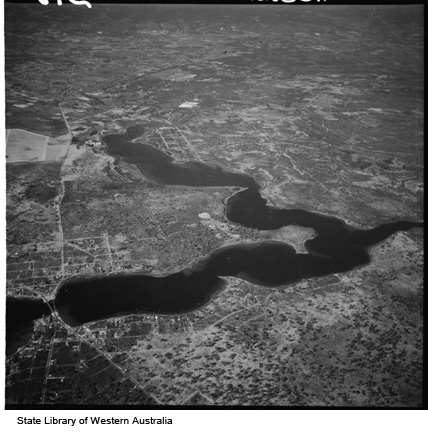
Canning River and Bull Creek, c. 1932

The first European contact was in 1801 when a French exploring party spotted the mouth. The crew subsequently named the mouth Entrée Moreau, after Charles Moreau, a midshipman with the party.

The Canning River received its contemporary name in 1827 when Captain James Stirling aboard HMS Success following an examination of the region in March 1827 named the river after George Canning, an eminent British statesman who was Prime Minister of Great Britain at the time and whose government facilitated the funds for the expedition.

In November 1829, just five months after the founding of the Swan River Colony, an exploring party led by now Governor James Stirling chose a site for a new town named Kelmscott on the banks of the Canning River.

== Convicts ==
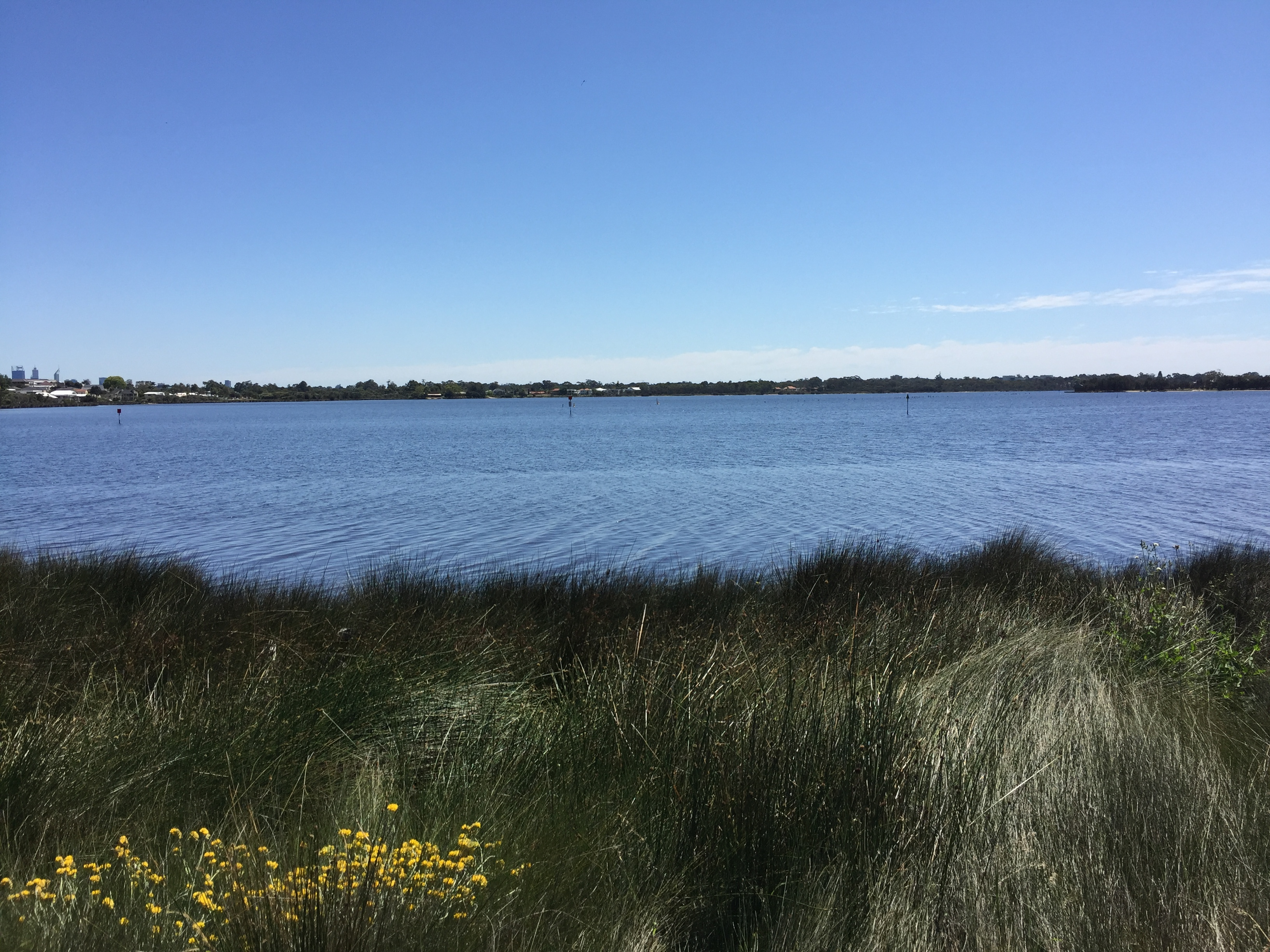
Part of the Convict Fence in Canning River between Shelley Foreshore Reserve and Salter Point

Convicts partly constructed and maintained the Canning River Convict Fence. This structure is still a notable landmark to this day. It was built primarily for the use of barges carrying timber from Mason's Timber Mill in the Darling Ranges.

== Algae bloom ==
Algal blooms occur naturally in the Canning River system; they are caused by a buildup of nutrients in the river. Human activities including farming, residential gardens and parklands are the major causes of increases in levels; the blooms are potentially toxic to both mammal and marine life. The Swan River Trust monitors the levels of nutrients and growth of the algae, issuing warnings and closing sections of the river to all activities. The Trust also operates cleanup programs to reduce the amount of nutrients reaching the river, as well phosphorus removal and oxygenation in areas were blooms have been identified.

The Trust is encouraged by the appearance of Azolla carpets on sections of the Canning River as this fern is known to reduce the amount of sunlight available to the algae as well as absorbing large amounts of phosphorus and other nutrients from the water. However, it is possible that Azolla carpets can cause deoxygenation and emit a strong sulphur smell.

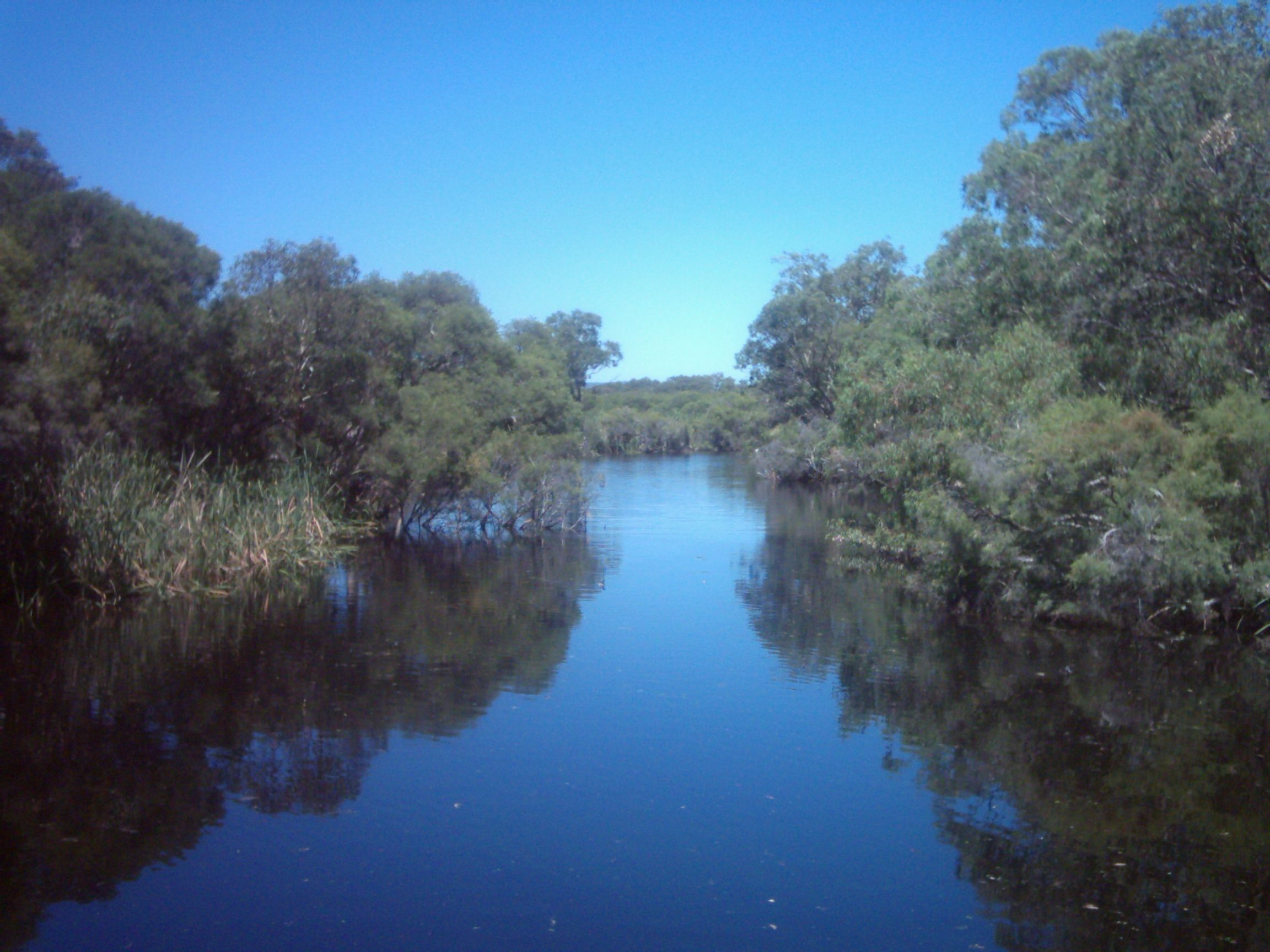
Canning River without Azolla in February 2006

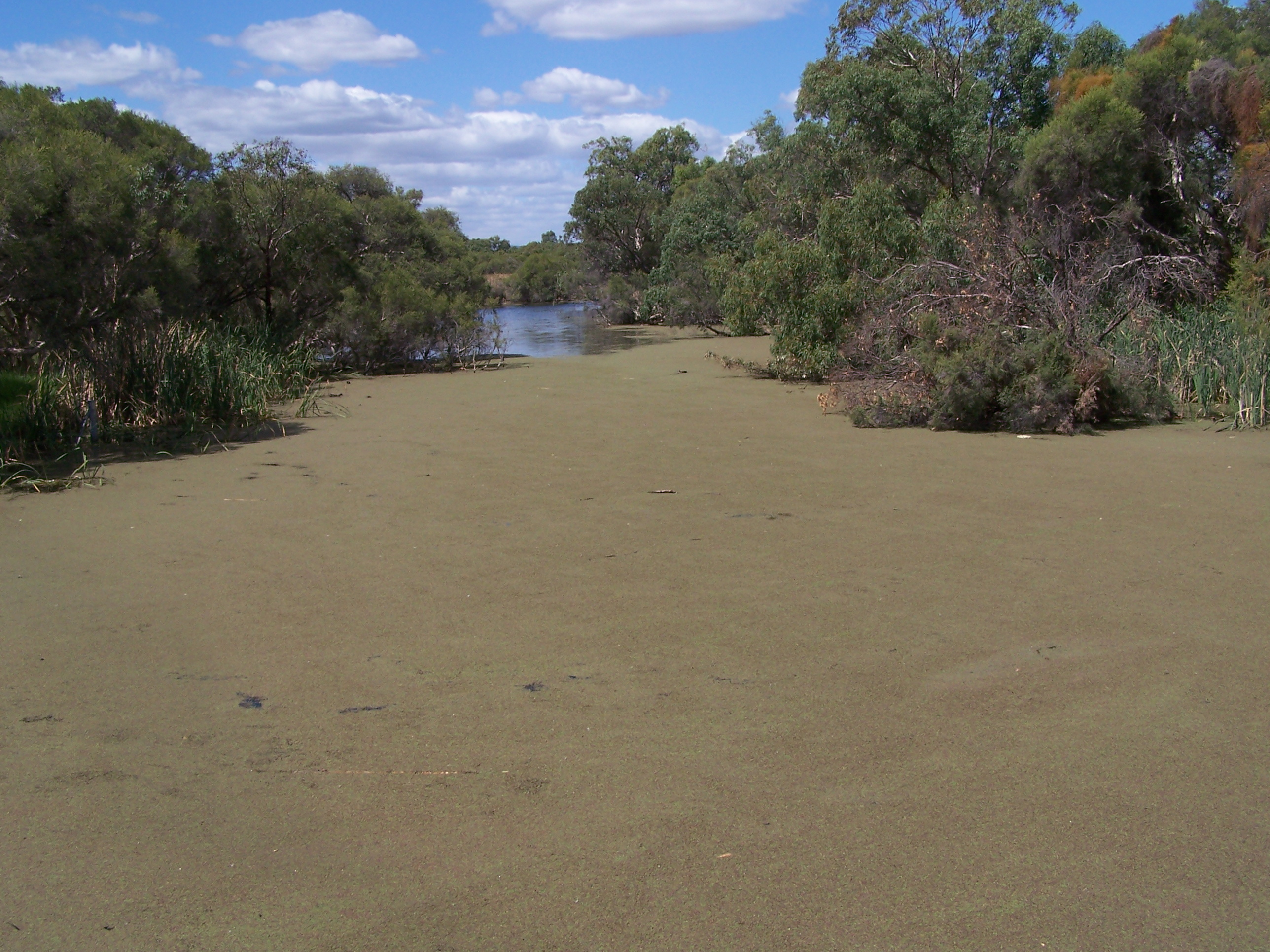
Same location covered in a carpet of Azolla in March 2007

== See also ==
- Canning Dam
- Canning River Regional Park
- Head of the River
- List of islands of Perth, Western Australia
- Mount Henry Peninsula

== Sources ==
- Brearley, Anne (2005). Ernest Hodgkin's Swanland: Estuaries and Coastal Lagoons of South-western Australia. Crawley: University of Western Australia Press for the Ernest Hodgkin Trust for Estuary Education and Research and National Trust of Australia (WA). ISBN 1-920694-38-2.
- Broomhall, Susan, ed. (2012). Rivers of Emotion: an Emotional History of Derbarl Yerrigan and Djarlgarro Beelier: the Swan and Canning Rivers. Crawley: Australian Research Council. Centre of Excellence. ISBN 978-1-74052-260-1. OCLC 820979809.
- Carden, F.G. (1991) [1968]. Along the Canning: a History of the City of Canning Western Australia, Covering Its Progress from Roads Board to Shire, to Town, to City (2nd ed.). City of Canning.
- Hutchison, D.; Davidson, Dianne (1979). "The Convict-Built 'Fence' in the Canning River" (PDF). Records of the Western Australian Museum. 8 (1): 147–159.
- Kinsella, John (2017). Polysituatedness: A Poetics of Displacement. Oxford University Press. ISBN 978-1-5261-1337-5.
- LePage, J.S.H. (1986). Building A State: The Story of the Public Works Department of Western Australia 1829-1985. Leederville: Water Authority of Western Australia. ISBN 978-0-7244-6862-1.
- McQueen, Jeanette (1963). Pioneers of the Canning District (Thesis). Graylands Teachers College.
