= List of State Register of Heritage Places in the Shire of Beverley =

The State Register of Heritage Places is maintained by the Heritage Council of Western Australia. As of 2026, 100 places are heritage-listed in the Shire of Beverley, of which 18 are on the State Register of Heritage Places.

== List ==
The Western Australian State Register of Heritage Places, as of 2026, lists the following 18 state registered places within the Shire of Beverley:

Place name	Place #	Street number	Street name	Suburb or town	Co-ordinates	Notes & former names	Photo
St Paul's Anglican Church & Graveyard, Edwards Crossing	144		"Speldhurst", Avon Location	Beverley	32.077258°S 116.883341°E		
Beverley Railway Station	147		Vincent Street	Beverley	32.107664°S 116.92556°E		
St Mary's Anglican Church Precinct, Beverley	150	64	John Street	Beverley	32.104096°S 116.920557°E	Eucalyptus Citriodora-Lemon Scented Gum, Rectory, Lychgate	
Beverley Town Hall	154	138, 140&142	Vincent Street	Beverley	32.109127°S 116.923911°E		
Beverley Post Office & Quarters	157		Vincent Street	Beverley	32.108784°S 116.925005°E		
Hotel Beverley	162	137	Vincent Street	Beverley	32.109343°S 116.925174°E	Railway Hotel	
Bally Bally Hall	164	Corner	Caroling-Bally Bally & Bally Bally-County Peak Roads	Beverley	32.185°S 117.118189°E		
Beverley Mechanic's Institute (former) - Site of	4540	138	Vincent Street	Beverley	32.109022°S 116.924156°E	Site of Present Townhall	
Avondale Research Station	5566	Lot 3	Waterhatch Road	Beverley	32.116667°S 116.868861°E	Discovery Farm, Machinery Museum, Avondale State Farm, Avondale Seed Farm	
The Sentinels - Town Hall Trees	5592		Vincent Street	Beverley	32.109334°S 116.924028°E		
Beverley Judicial Complex	6291	Corner	Vincent & Bartram Streets	Beverley	32.108122°S 116.928199°E	Beverley Courthouse, Police Station & Quarters	
Beverley Fire Station	14438	146	Vincent Street	Beverley	32.109276°S 116.923573°E		
Railway Hotel, Beverley Railway Station	14916		Vincent Street	Beverley	^{[?]}		
Eucalyptus Citriodora Tree	23903	64	John Street	Beverley	^{[?]}		
St Mary's Anglican Rectory	23915	64	John Street	Beverley	^{[?]}		
St Mary's Anglican Church	24394	64	John Street	Beverley	32.104334°S 116.920366°E		
Old Police Buildings	24398	Lot 28	Bartram Street	Beverley	32.108122°S 116.928199°E		
Beverley Court House	24453		Corner Vincent & Bartram Streets	Beverley	32.10788°S 116.928033°E		

== Notes ==
- ^[?]No coordinates specified by Inherit database
