= Avondale Estate =

Avondale Estate may refer to:

- the Avondale Agricultural Research Station in Western Australia, formerly known as Avondale Estate
- Avondale Estates, Georgia, a city in DeKalb County, Georgia, United States
- Avondale Estate in Cooranbong, New South Wales, Australia
- Avondale Estates in Parkland County, Alberta, Canada
