= Beverley railway station, Western Australia =

Former railway station in Western Australia

Beverley
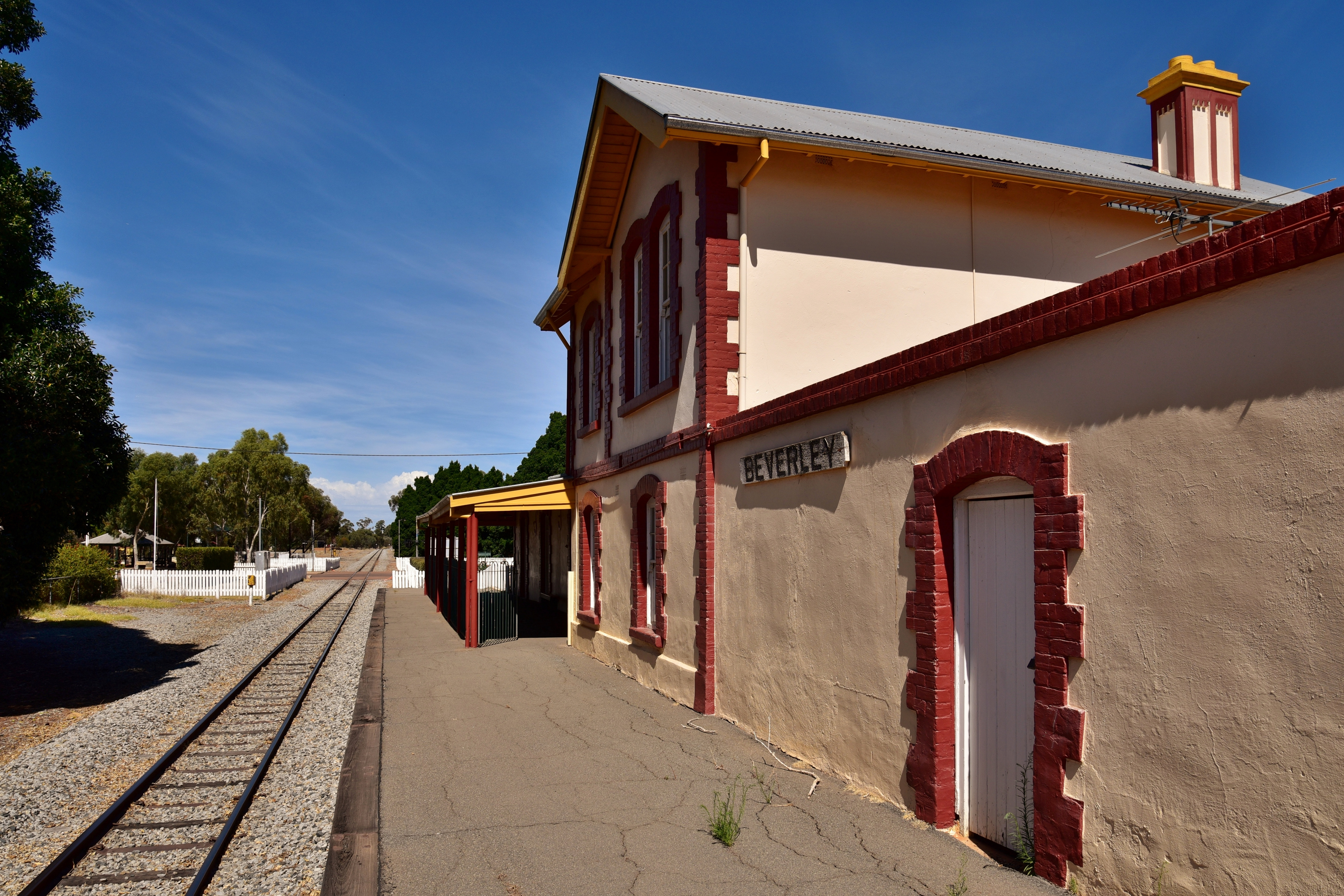
- Southbound view in March 2018

General information
- Location: Railway Street, Beverley, Western Australia
- Coordinates: 32.108160°S 116.925700°E
- Owner: Arc Infrastructure
- Operator: Westrail
- Line: Great Southern
- Platforms: 1
- Tracks: 1

Other information
- Status: Closed

History
- Opened: 6 August 1886
- Closed: 1 December 1978

Services
Albany Progress
Location

Beverley railway station in Beverley, Western Australia is a railway station on the Great Southern railway line.

== History ==
Beverley railway station opened on 5 August 1886 when the Great Southern railway line opened from York. It was the terminus until the line was extended to Albany on 3 June 1889.

The station was served by the Albany Progress until it ceased in December 1978.

In 1996 it was listed on the State Register of Heritage Places. Between 2003 and 2005, the station was restored with the platform reduced to 80 metres.
