= Silver Centenary =

Biplane built in Western Australia

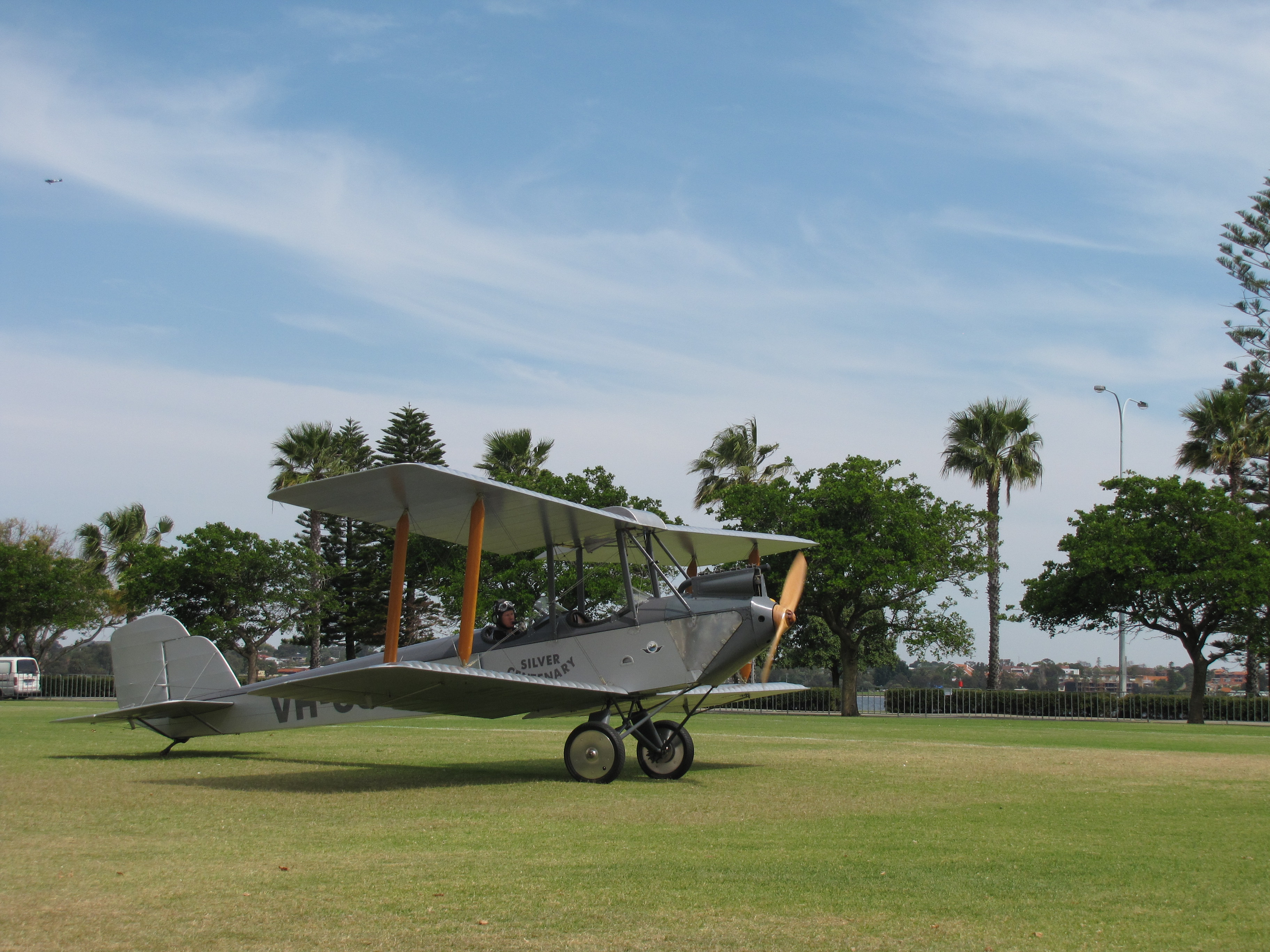
Silver Centenary at Langley Park for the Sports Aircraft Association of Australia fly-in

The Silver Centenary is a biplane which was built in Beverley, Western Australia between 1929 and 1930 by a local named Selby Ford. Plans for the aircraft, which was named in honour of Western Australia's 1929 centenary, were drawn to scale on the floor of the Beverley powerhouse which Ford owned. The aircraft made its inaugural flight on 1 July 1930, and was flown for the next 18 months, but after Ford proved unable to provide the authorities with blueprints and technical specifications, it was mothballed in 1933.

== Overview ==
For the next thirty years, the aircraft hung from the roof of the Beverley powerhouse. After Ford's death from a car accident in 1963, the people of Beverley created an Aviation museum with the Silver Centenary as the featured piece.

In 2006, Ford's grandson Rod Edwards retrieved the aircraft from the museum to enable restoration, which caused much concern to the people of Beverley. As part of the restoration, Mr Edwards decided to obtain airworthy certification for the aircraft. In August 2007, the Silver Centenary received its airworthy certificate 77 years after it was originally built.

== Construction ==
Original plans for the Silver Centenary were sketched in chalk on the floor of the Beverley powerhouse in 1928, and from these plans templates were made. With the help of the local butcher Tom Shackles, the frame was crafted out of spruce and maple timber. Tom's sister Elsie sewed all the fabric for the aircraft. As the biplane took shape resembling that of a Tiger Moth, Ford undertook an Australia wide search for an engine. During the Western Australian Centenary Air Race in 1929, a competitor crashed in Baandee 120 km from Beverley, and Ford purchased the undamaged engine for £170. This purchase was mentioned in a Sydney Newspaper, which brought the project to the attention of the Civil Aviation Authority (CAA), who sent WA aviation inspector Jim Collopy to inspect the work:

Ford and Shackles have had no aircraft experience, and their knowledge of aerodynamics and aircraft design is very limited, and taking this into account they have made a very good effort. The building of the machine was so far advanced that a detailed inspection of every component and assembly was practically impossible, as there was not a single sketch, drawing or diagram to assist one in the inspection of assemblies already built up.

— Jim Collopy, Civil Aviation Authority

Collopy indicated that Ford would need to register the aircraft, and suggested strengthening of the undercarriage. Ford made the modifications, and painted the first part of the aircraft registration on the plane. In June 1930 Ford notified the CAA that the aircraft was ready for its maiden flight. Piloted by Captain C.H. Nesbit of Western Air Services, the flight took place on 1 July 1930. The aircraft was towed from the powerhouse along the main street of Beverley to Benson's paddock, and most of the town turned out to watch, although the shire council voiced its disapproval at Ford for taking such a risk.

== Flights ==
Arriving at Benson's paddock, Nesbit climbed aboard and started the engine. Originally intending just to taxi around the field, Nesbit was in the air within few seconds. After flying for 25 minutes Nesbit landed, later remarking that it felt so right he decided to "give it the gun". Nesbit then made series of 10-minute joyflights, first with Ford, then Shackles, followed by Ford's sisters Rita and then Elsie.

On 4 July 1930, Ford with Nesbit at the controls flew to Northam to meet up with and escort Amy Johnson and Geoffrey de Havilland Jr. to Perth. Receiving the news that Johnson had been delayed in Kalgoorlie, Ford and Nesbit flew onto Maylands Airport, where West Australian airways made hangar space available for the Silver Centenary. When Johnson arrived she inspected the Silver Centenary and expressed disappointment that bad weather prevented her from flying the plane. On 14 July 1930, the Silver Centenary returned to Beverley, with the shire council congratulating Ford and offering to assist with any further events.

Captain Nesbit died, along with his two pupils, on 13 October 1930, whilst flying an almost-new Puss Moth on a training flight from Maylands Aerodrome and return. The Puss Moth suffered a wing main spar failure at its root, resulting in detachment of the starboard wing.The Silver Centenary wasn't flown again until April 1931. During these flights, the pilot became concerned about the lack of a complete registration number, and contacted the CAA. It was revealed that the Silver Centenary was designated as an experimental aircraft, and had been restricted to flying only within 5 km of Beverley. Ford was unaware of the restriction until that time, and then applied for permission to return the plane to Beverley, which occurred in September 1931.

Ford applied to have the aircraft licensed, but without blueprints, stress charts and other design documents the CAA refused to grant an airworthy certificate. In December 1931, permission was granted for the aircraft to be flown to Narrogin for an air show, conditional that it didn't carry any passengers during the flight and that it wasn't flown during the show. The return flight to Beverley on 6 December 1931 became Silver Centenary's last flight for almost 76 years. The log books for the Silver Centenary show that it flew for a total of 9 hours 40 minutes across 21 flights, although many of its flights were not recorded. In 1932, permission was sought to use the aircraft for mining exploration in the goldfields around Kalgoorlie; that was declined. In 1933, Ford returned the Silver Centenary to the powerhouse, where it hung from the roof until after his death in 1963.

== Museum ==
In 1962, the Western Australian Museum expressed an interest in buying the Silver Centenary, but with Ford's death in a motor vehicle accident in 1963, the people of Beverley started the Selby Ford Memorial Fund, the purpose of which was to keep the aircraft in Beverley as a tribute to Ford. In January 1964, the Silver Centenary was lowered from the roof of the powerhouse, and a wall was removed enabling the aircraft to be moved. After being cleaned up, the Silver Centenary was put into storage again until completion of the Beverley Aeronautical Museum in 1967, where it became the feature piece.

There is an interactive display, complete with a 1:5 scale model, exact replica of the Silver Centenary aircraft built in Beverley, located at the Beverley Visitor Centre, 141 Vincent Street, Beverley, Western Australia.

== Restoration ==
Shire Crest, with the Silver Centenary

In 2006 Rod Edwards, the grandson of Ford and current owner of the Silver Centenary, decided to restore the aircraft. As part of the restoration, he undertook the requirement to obtain an airworthy certificate. Since the aircraft has become an icon of the shire, Edwards' plans caused concern amongst the locals. Shire councilor Belinda Foster said "The town wasn't very happy about it going...its on the shire's crest,"
