= The Midlander =

The Midlander may refer to:

- The Midlander (Queensland Rail), former train service operated by Queensland Rail
- The Midlander (Western Australian Government Railways), former train service operated by the Western Australian Government Railways
- The Midlanders, 1920 silent drama film
