= City of Fremantle Centenary Building =

Demolished building in Fremantle, Western Australia

The City of Fremantle Centenary Building was built by the Fremantle Council for the Centenary of Western Australia in 1929. It provided extra reception and office space for the council, the Federal Electoral Department, Tramway Board, and Water Supply Receiving Department) as well as other tenants, and improved public toilets.

It was constructed of brick and cement facing, to match the Fremantle Town Hall which it abutted on William Street at the junction with Newman Street, on the site of a former blacksmith's shop whose enterprising proprietor J. W. Porter became a coachbuilder in 1908. The site was vacant by 1927.

The building was demolished in the 1960s for development of expanded Council administration facilities.
