= Claremont Showground =

Agricultural show grounds in Perth, Western Australia

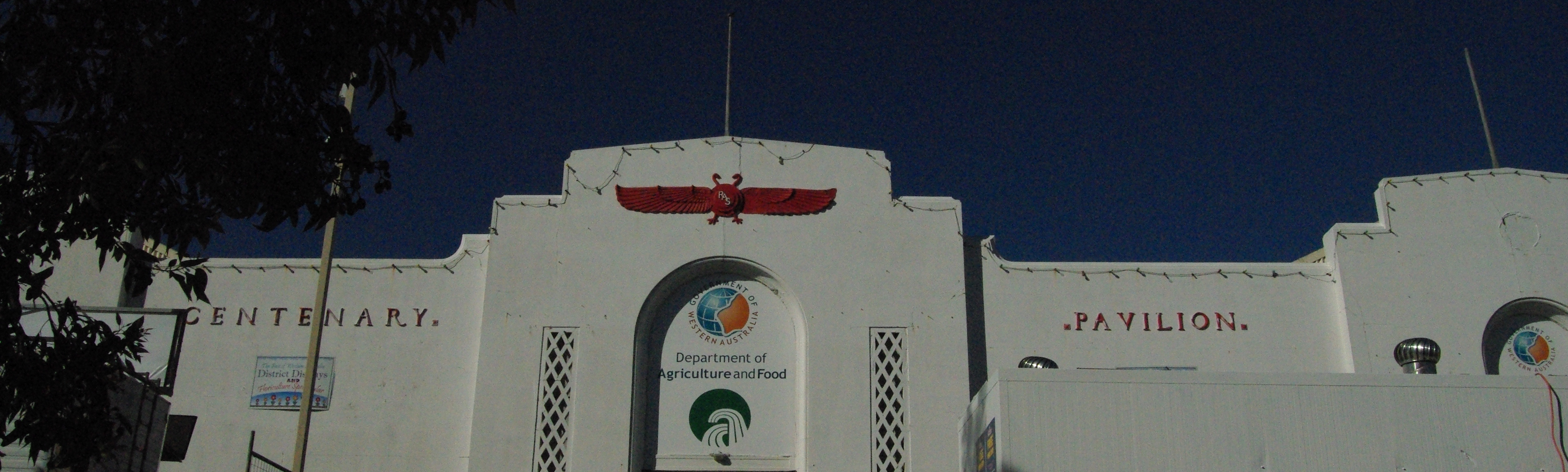
- Interactive map of Claremont Showground
- Location: Claremont, Western Australia
- Coordinates: 31°58′32″S 115°47′08″E
- Owner: Royal Agricultural Society of Western Australia
- Operator: Royal Agricultural Society of Western Australia
- Capacity: 40,000 (Big Day Out 2011); 10,000 (WAFL matches)
- Public transit: Showgrounds; Claremont

Construction
- Opened: 1905; 121 years ago

Tenants
- Big Day Out (2002-2011, 2013); Perth Royal Show; Claremont-Cottesloe Football Club (1926); Claremont Speedway (1927-2000); Supanova Pop Culture Expo (2008–2013); Claremont Football Club (2014–2016)

The Claremont Showground in Perth, Western Australia, is home to the annual Perth Royal Show. In 1902, 13 hectares (32 acres) of land were reserved in Claremont, a suburb of Perth, for a new showground to replace the Guildford Showgrounds. The Royal Agricultural Show, of three days, was first held there in October and November 1905.

== History ==
During World War I and World War II, the showgrounds were used to house and train Australian troops.

In 1929, a pavilion and other features were built for the Western Australia Centenary.

The Claremont Showground is serviced by a special events railway station on the Fremantle line. Opened on 20 September 1995, it has direct connection with the showgrounds. The original Showgrounds Station, opened in 1954, was located 350 metres (1,150 ft) further east with platforms on either side of the line, and required negotiating road crossings to access the showgrounds.

== Bruce Campbell Arena ==
The Bruce Campbell Arena, an enclosed grass field forms the focal point of events at the Showgrounds.

=== Speedway ===
From 1927 until 2000, the 586-metre (641-yard) Claremont Speedway operated on a track around the edge of the arena. Its size made it the largest speedway in weekly operation in a state capital in Australia.

With the closure of Claremont, speedway in Perth moved to the 500-metre (550-yard) Perth Motorplex Speedway in Kwinana Beach.

=== Australian rules football ===
The arena has in the past been used for Australian rules football matches. In the West Australian Football League (WAFL), Perth won its first premiership against East Fremantle there in 1907. They were the original home of Claremont-Cottesloe Football Club in its first year in the WAFL before moving to Claremont Oval in 1927. On 19 March 2005, the venue was used to host a one-off WAFL match between Claremont and West Perth, with Claremont winning in front of 7,812 spectators. Due to redevelopment of Claremont Oval, Claremont used the Showgrounds as its home ground between 2014 and 2016.
