= Western Australian Centenary Air Race =

Air race in 1929 in Australia

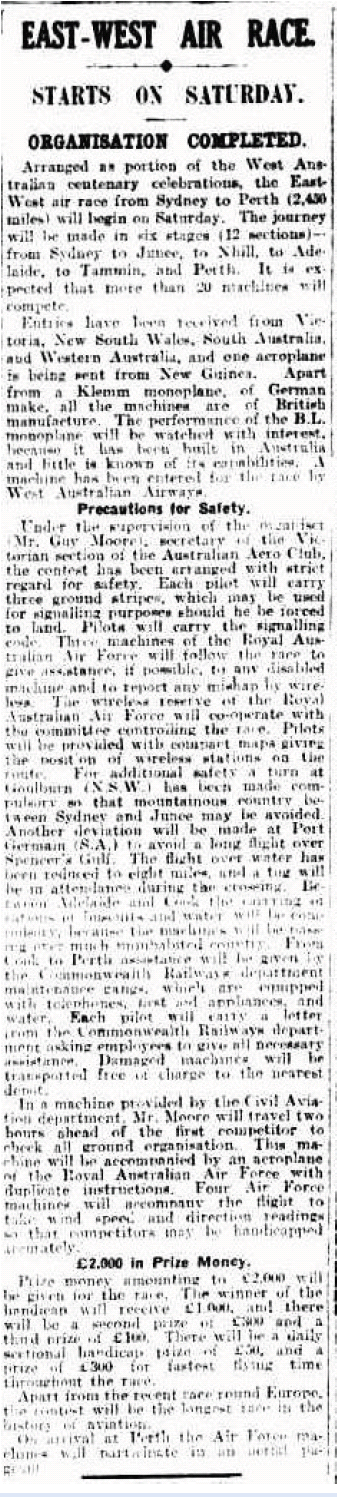
Melbourne newspaper article dated 23 September 1929 announcing the race

The Western Australian Centenary Air Race (also known as the East-West Air Race) was a 2,450-mile (3,940 km) air race held in 1929 from Sydney to Perth to commemorate the centenary of Western Australia.

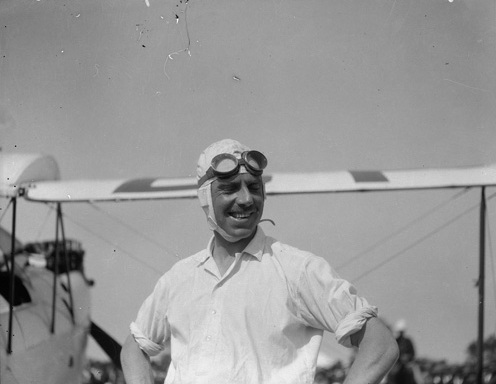
Hereward de Havilland in Perth after taking the fastest overall time prize

The £1000 handicap winner was Horrie Miller and the £300 fastest overall time prize was won by Briton Major Hereward de Havilland (22 hours 50 minutes 23 seconds), who flew the course solo, the only competitor to do so, in a modified de Havilland Gypsy Moth.

Determining results in the handicap event was found to be a difficult task, with type of machine, weather conditions, wind direction and strength of wind for each half day's hop, supplemented by times of starting being taken into consideration.

700 people had turned out at Kalgoorlie to see the competitors off on the final leg of the race. Victorian C.D. Pratt and his co-pilot J.R. Guthrie were both seriously injured when their Gypsy Moth Corio crashed near Baandee, 230 kilometres (140 mi) east of Perth. Weather conditions after leaving Tammin were said to be atrocious, with at least one forced landing and one crash.

The 17 teams left from Mascot in Sydney on 29 September 1929 and 14 finished at Maylands Aerodrome on Sunday 7 October.

== Fastest times ==
1. H. de Havilland (22 hours 50 minutes 23 seconds)
2. Heath (23.24.51)
3. Miller (23.31.58)
4. Cunningham (26.56.52)
5. Pentland (27.14.44)
6. Eaton (28.17.30)
7. McKay (29.23.10)
8. Bardsley (29.37.58)
9. Davies (29.32.54)
10. Manifold (30.31.58)
11. Farmer (31.35.7)
12. Knapman (32.4.49)
13. Lee Murray (32.30.0)
14. Penny (32.56.20)

== See also ==
- Silver Centenary
