= Beverley, Western Australia =

Beverley
- Town
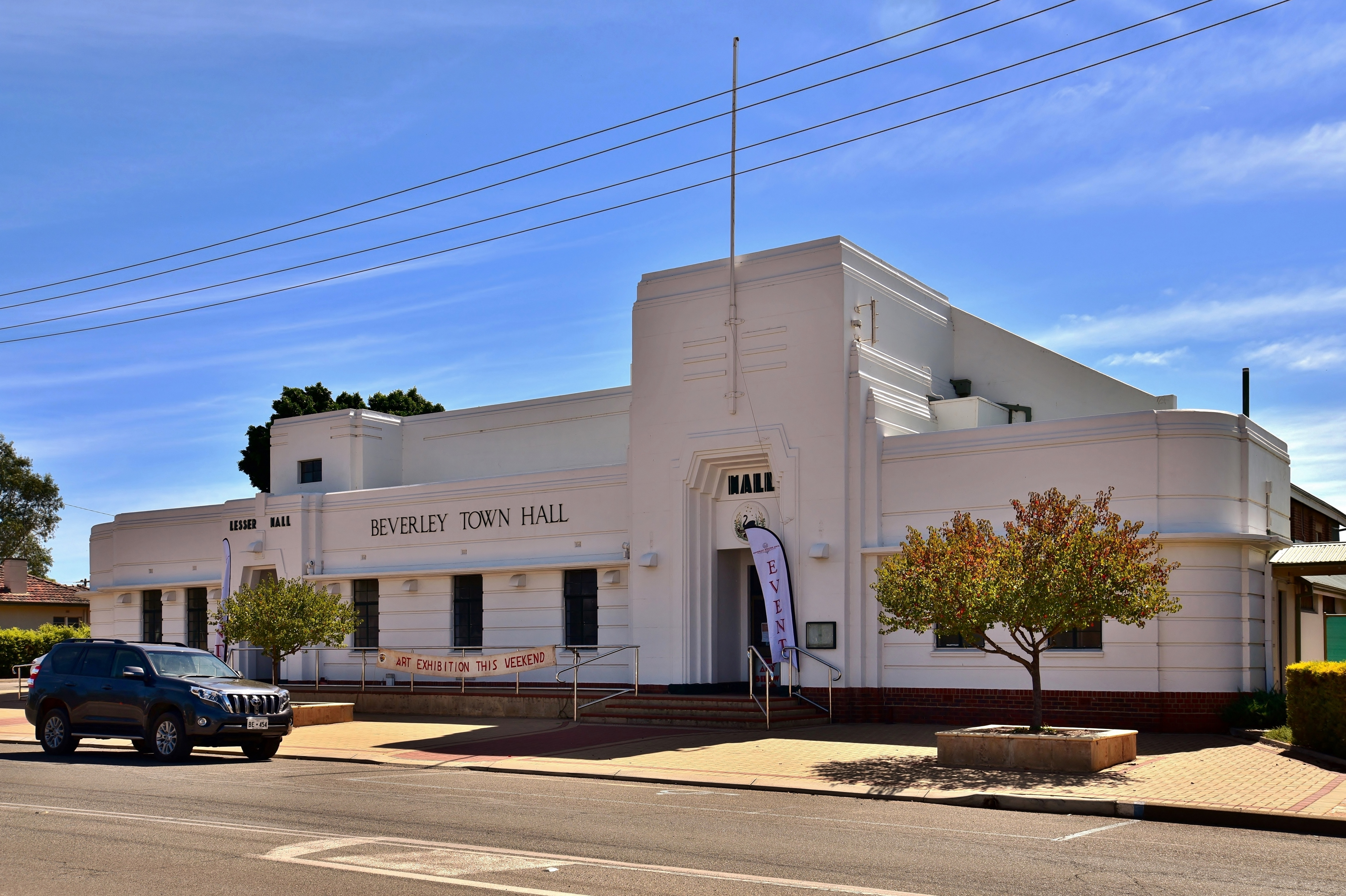
- Beverley Town Hall in 2018

- Interactive map of Beverley
- Coordinates: 32.109°S 116.926°E
- Country: Australia
- State: Western Australia
- Region: Wheatbelt
- LGA: Shire of Beverley
- Location: 133 km (83 mi) SE of Perth
- Established: 1868

Government
  - State electorate: Central Wheatbelt
  - Federal division: Bullwinkel

Area
  - Total: 384.1 km^{2} (148.3 sq mi)
- Elevation: 232 m (761 ft)

Population
  - Total: 869 (UCL 2021)
- Postcode: 6304
- Mean max temp: 25.2 °C (77.4 °F)
- Mean min temp: 10.2 °C (50.4 °F)
- Annual rainfall: 420.4 mm (16.55 in)

Beverley is a town in the Wheatbelt region of Western Australia, 133 kilometres (83 mi) south-east of the state capital, Perth, between York and Brookton on the Great Southern Highway. It is on the Great Southern railway line.

== History ==
The town is believed to be named after Beverley in Yorkshire, from where some of the earliest explorers of the Avon valley originated, including Colonial Surgeon Charles Simmons, an early landowner in the district. Land at Beverley was set aside for a townsite in 1831, just two years after the Swan River Colony's foundation, after a glowing report to Governor James Stirling by Ensign (later Lieutenant) Robert Dale, who made three trips to the York-Beverley area. The district was surveyed in 1843.

While settlers arrived from the 1860s onwards, and a town was established in 1868, it wasn't until the arrival of the Great Southern railway line with a railway station in 1886 that the town started to grow, and with the completion of the railway in 1889 to Albany, Beverley became an important centre. By early 1898 the population of the town was 190, 93 males and 97 females.

In 1908, the Goldfields Water Supply Scheme was extended to supply the town with water, and by World War I, the town had four hotels, four banks, two bakeries, two tailors, three tearooms, a jeweller and two hairdressers, amongst other businesses, and in 1938, a new town hall opened.

However, since the 1950s, with improved transport, communications and farming methods, the population of the Shire of Beverley fell from 1,968 in 1954 to 1,433 in 1991, and several banks and other town services closed. The population has started to grow again due to the popularity of rural residential estates and the town's proximity to Perth.

== Present day ==
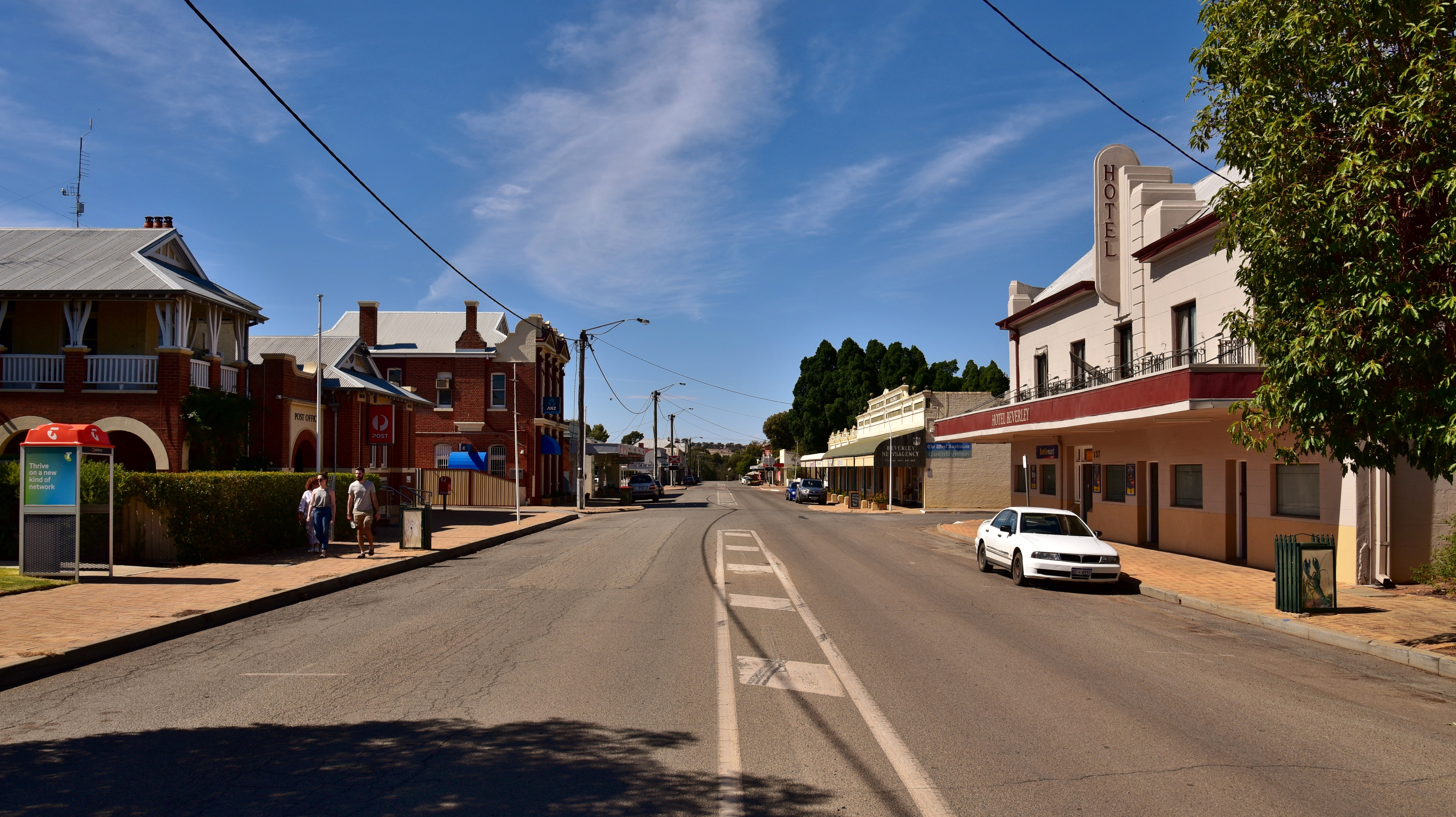
Vincent Street, the main street in Beverley, in 2018

Beverley is on Great Southern Highway, 133 kilometres (83 mi) southeast of Perth, and provides commercial and industrial support to the surrounding agricultural area. Each year in August the town hosts an agricultural show. A museum, formerly the Settlers Arms Hotel, offers local history exhibits. In addition, a town hall, district high school, bank, shopping facilities, accommodation (hotel, Beverley B&B, caravan park), council offices, district hospital and medical centre, a Community Resource Centre (who run the library and Visitor Centre), and various sporting facilities are located within the town. The shire also have one of the best kept ovals in the Avon. A wide range of building styles exist.

6.2 kilometres (4 mi) to the west of the town is the Avondale Agricultural Research Station. Avondale gets its name from the Avon and Dale rivers which join near the farm. For over 80 years, Avondale has been a major centre for agricultural research, and since 1979 has been home to an extensive collection of historical farm machinery. The station hosts a number of events during the year, including the Ploughing Days in June.

From a 2011 survey there was 1147 people living in Beverley. See statistic here.

The town is a stop on the Transwa bus service to Albany.

Vincent Street underwent a transformation in recent years with the project being complete at the end of 2022.

== Link to aviation history ==
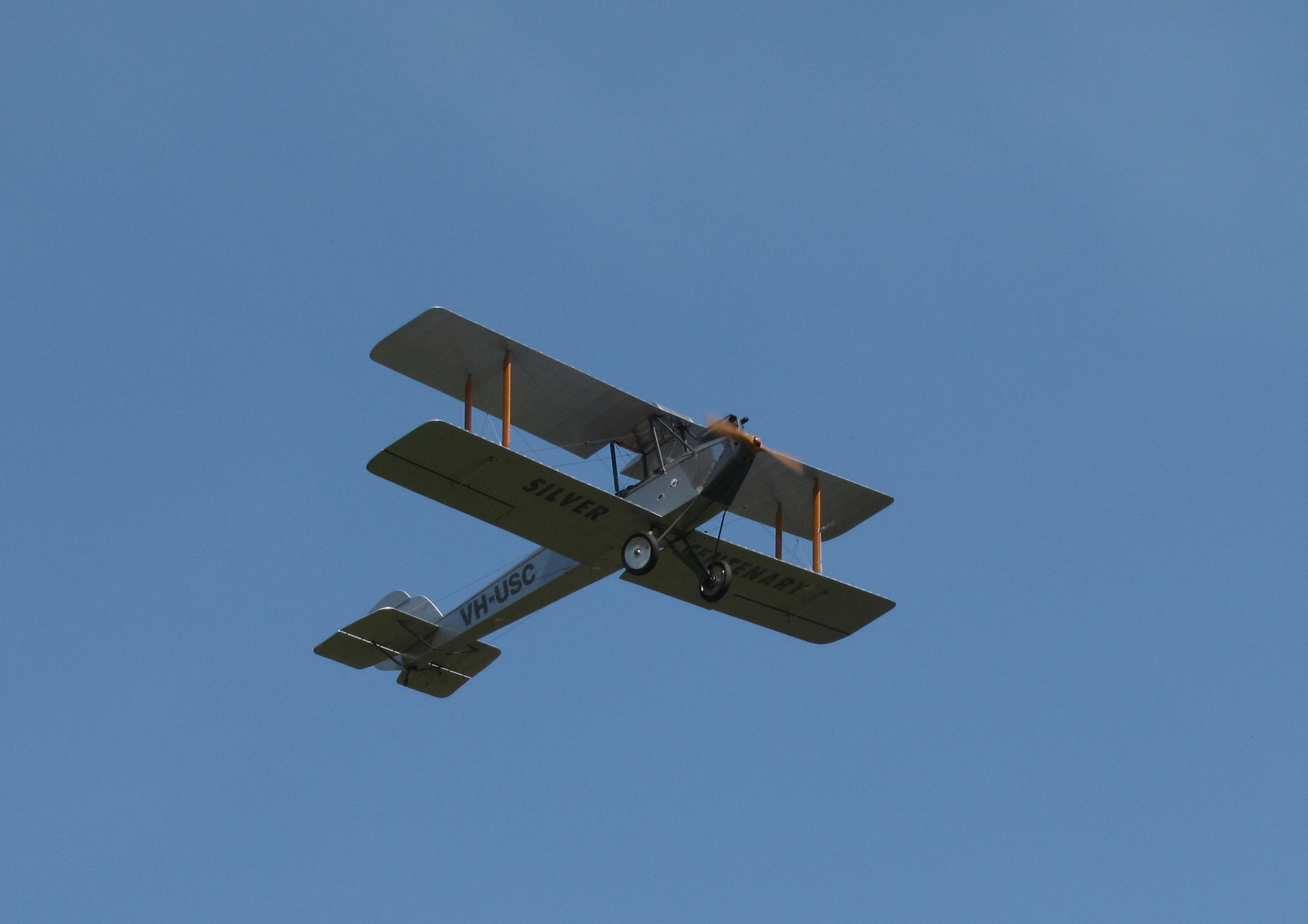
The Silver Centenary in flight, 2011

Beverley has a strong history of aviation. The Silver Centenary, Western Australia's oldest existing aircraft was built to commemorate the State's centenary in 1929, and was constructed from chalk drawings sketched on the floor of the town powerhouse. The town airfield has been home for the last forty years to the Beverley Soaring Society, one of the biggest gliding clubs in Australia (120 members). The club was founded in 1973.

As of December 2013, the club had three 2-seat training aircraft, two single seat sailplanes and two Piper Pawnee Tugs. Additionally members own a further thirty five private gliders hangared at the airfield. Club members regularly compete at club, state and national levels and hold several State and National gliding distance, height and speed records.

== Climate ==
Climate data for Beverley, Western Australia (1991–2020 normals, extremes 1968–present)
Month	Jan	Feb	Mar	Apr	May	Jun	Jul	Aug	Sep	Oct	Nov	Dec	Year
Record high °C (°F)	46.4 (115.5)	46.8 (116.2)	42.8 (109.0)	39.0 (102.2)	34.8 (94.6)	25.7 (78.3)	25.3 (77.5)	28.8 (83.8)	34.8 (94.6)	39.4 (102.9)	43.0 (109.4)	45.2 (113.4)	46.8 (116.2)
Mean daily maximum °C (°F)	34.6 (94.3)	33.8 (92.8)	30.9 (87.6)	26.6 (79.9)	21.7 (71.1)	18.3 (64.9)	17.1 (62.8)	18.0 (64.4)	20.4 (68.7)	25.1 (77.2)	29.3 (84.7)	32.6 (90.7)	25.7 (78.3)
Daily mean °C (°F)	25.5 (77.9)	25.3 (77.5)	22.9 (73.2)	19.1 (66.4)	14.8 (58.6)	12.1 (53.8)	11.1 (52.0)	11.6 (52.9)	13.2 (55.8)	16.7 (62.1)	20.6 (69.1)	23.5 (74.3)	18.0 (64.4)
Mean daily minimum °C (°F)	16.4 (61.5)	16.7 (62.1)	14.8 (58.6)	11.5 (52.7)	7.8 (46.0)	6.0 (42.8)	5.2 (41.4)	5.2 (41.4)	6.0 (42.8)	8.3 (46.9)	11.9 (53.4)	14.5 (58.1)	10.4 (50.7)
Mean minimum °C (°F)	6.6 (43.9)	6.9 (44.4)	2.6 (36.7)	0.7 (33.3)	−1.8 (28.8)	−3.6 (25.5)	−3.8 (25.2)	−2.6 (27.3)	−2.6 (27.3)	−1.0 (30.2)	−1.1 (30.0)	4.2 (39.6)	−3.8 (25.2)
Average precipitation mm (inches)	22.2 (0.87)	17.4 (0.69)	16.8 (0.66)	22.5 (0.89)	41.3 (1.63)	61.8 (2.43)	68.5 (2.70)	57.7 (2.27)	37.4 (1.47)	22.5 (0.89)	18.6 (0.73)	13.2 (0.52)	399.9 (15.74)
Average precipitation days (≥ 1.0 mm)	1.8	1.6	2.1	3.3	6.1	8.6	10.5	9.6	7.1	3.6	2.8	2.0	59.1
Average dew point °C (°F)	13.0 (55.4)	13.5 (56.3)	12.4 (54.3)	11.6 (52.9)	9.6 (49.3)	8.3 (46.9)	7.8 (46.0)	8.1 (46.6)	8.7 (47.7)	8.4 (47.1)	9.5 (49.1)	11.1 (52.0)	10.2 (50.4)
Source 1: National Oceanic and Atmospheric Administration
Source 2: Bureau of Meteorology

== Sport and recreation ==
Beverley hosts an annual Easter tennis tournament from the 25–28 March.

Beverley is also home to the Beverley Football Club. They compete in the Avon Football Association.

== See also ==
- Electoral district of Beverley
- Silver Centenary
