= Western Australian 175th Anniversary =

The Western Australian 175th Anniversary of European settlement was celebrated in 2004.

The anniversary celebrations were different in style to the 1929 centenary events, and limited in their extent compared to those of the 150th anniversary in 1979.

Funding was made available for films about the original Noongar inhabitants for the celebrations, to acknowledge the original people.

Books and compilations related to the anniversary were published in 2004.

A range of community groups contributed to the celebration throughout the state, as did The West Australian, the sole daily WA newspaper.

== Icons of WA history ==
As part of the celebrations, a list was made of iconic events and places of Western Australian history. The list was compiled by the Western Australian Government and the National Trust of Western Australia.

The public were able to nominate their choices, however the number of nominations were not the final deciding factor. Thirteen icons were included in the project, one for each month of the anniversary and two in December.

- Swan River
- Fremantle Harbour
- Kings Park
- ANZAC Day dawn service at Albany
- Rottnest Island
- Broome pearls
- Ningaloo Reef
- Western Derby, an Australian Football League match between the West Coast Eagles and Fremantle Dockers
- Kalgoorlie gold
- Perth Royal Show
- Bungle Bungle Range
- His Majesty's Theatre
- Midland Railway Workshops
