= Centenary of Western Australia =

Celebration of foundation of Western Australia

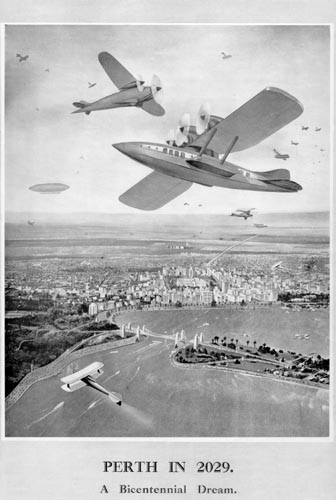
In 1929 the Western Mail published a Centenary Issue "2029 Perth", which included a 1929 artist's conception of what Perth would look like in 2029.

In 1929, Western Australia (WA) celebrated the centenary of the founding of Perth and the establishment of the Swan River Colony, the first permanent European settlement in WA. A variety of events were run in Perth, regional areas throughout the state, and even across Australia such as the Western Australian Centenary Air Race.

== Preparations ==
In 1926, the 25th anniversary of federation passed without much recognition, due in part to the sense of isolation that help to form Western Australia's identity. There was limited acknowledgement from the other states of the unique circumstances of Western Australia's situation, due to what historian Geoffrey Blainey described as "the tyranny of distance". It was this isolation that helped focus the community on celebrating its centenary; later, it would also be the catalyst for a growing secessionist movement.

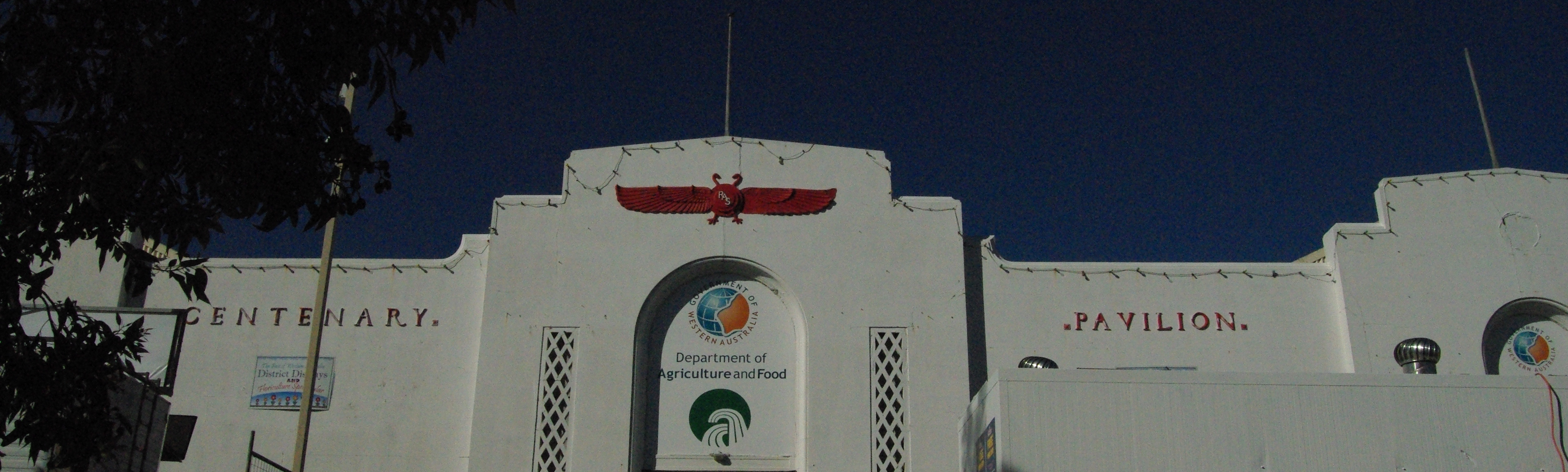
Centenary pavilion at Claremont Showground

In 1927, the premier, Philip Collier, asked Hal Colebatch to write a history of the state, and in 1929 A Story of a hundred years : Western Australia, 1829–1929 was published.

A celebration committee began preparations in 1928, and in 1929 produced a number of publications including calendars of events. As 1929 approached, most towns formed their own committees and organised events, these ranged from special race meetings to regional shows, formal dinners, dances and sporting events. Additionally some towns and community organisations also renamed existing local features like parks and buildings, while others set aside an area for a monument which was then unveiled in the presence of dignitaries including the governor, premier and descendants of the early settlers.

== Other events held in Perth in 1929 ==
In April 1929 there was a demonstration held in Perth of fire brigades from around the country. In June 1929 there was the Australian national general Methodist conference. In July 1929 there were interstate football games held in Perth.

== Centenary celebrations ==
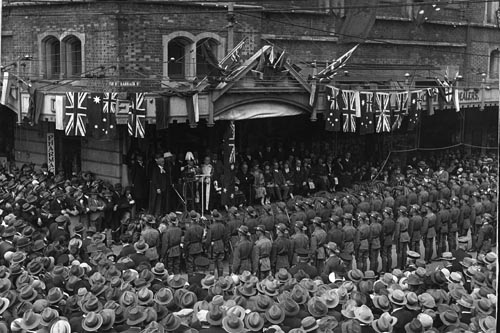
Crowd watching Sir William Campion at celebrations in August 1929, the placing of the Centenary plaque in the wall of the Perth Town Hall

Many locations in Western Australia had buildings or locations that became known as Centenary memorials; for example the Municipality of Fremantle built a Centenary Building, the Claremont Showground has a Centenary Pavilion that still stands, and Northam had a Centenary Hill.

Avenues of trees were planted in Kings Park in commemoration of the event as well as honouring people involved in the celebrations.

The Perth Mint produced a commemorative medal. Most of the 85,000 medals struck were bronze, and the majority were given to Western Australian school children. 900 silver medals were also made, as were 3 gold medals.

=== 12 August 1929 ===
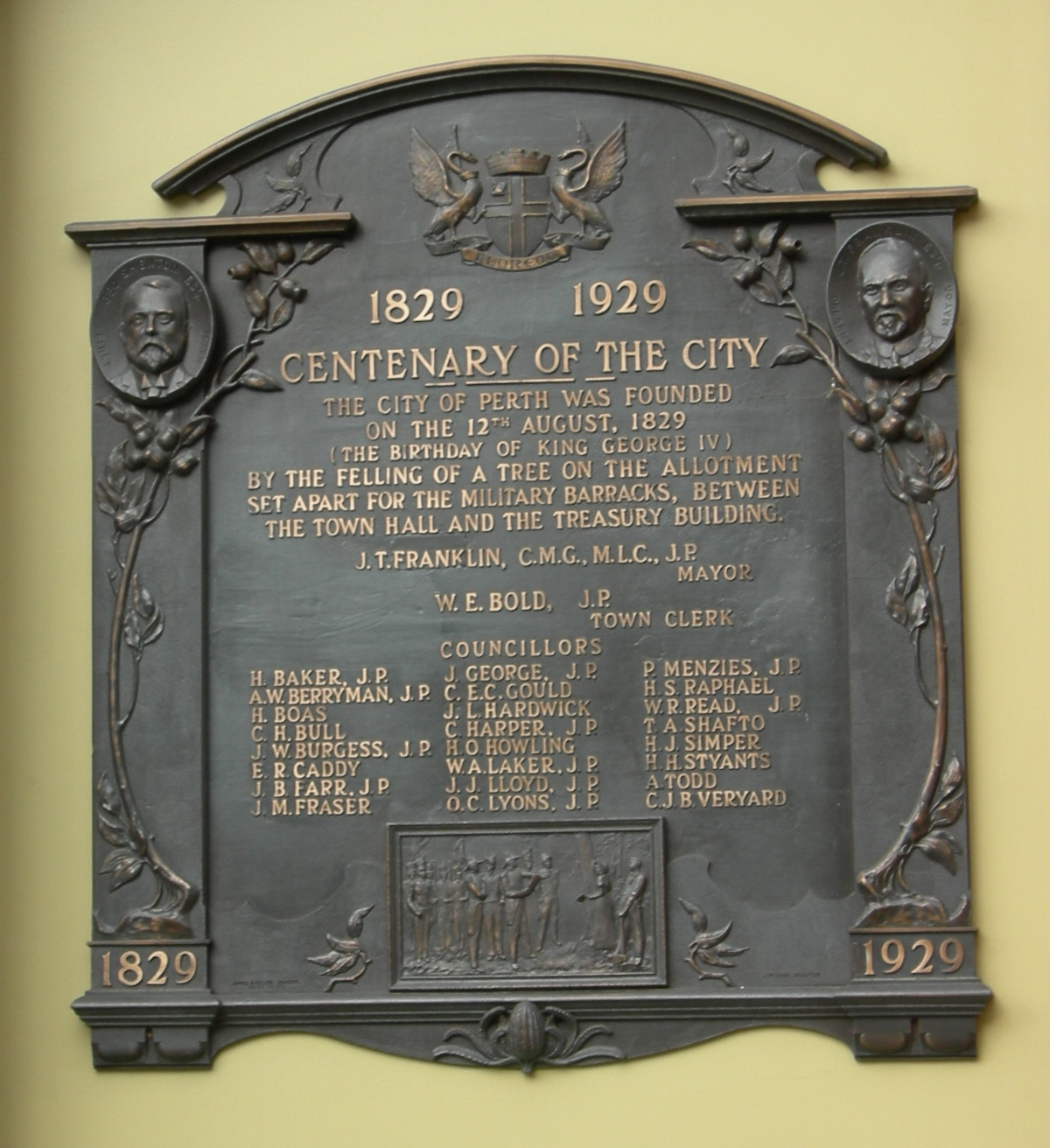
Perth Town Hall Centenary plaque

The governor Sir William Campion presided at the placement of a plaque in the wall of the Perth Town Hall on Barrack Street that recorded the centenary celebrations in August.

=== Centenary celebration period ===
The centenary celebration period was designated as 28 September 1929 – 12 October 1929.

Despite a range of events involving various national bodies in the year, the specific main event was the 1929 Centenary Parade, which was held on Wednesday 2 October (which had been made a public holiday) and known as the Historic and Industrial Procession, passing through Perth.

=== 2 October 1929 ===
Wednesday 2 October 1929 was a public holiday in Perth. The main centenary procession (1929 Centenary Parade) involved considerable preparation of floats representing commercial and regional attributes of the state. It passed through the streets of Perth. The Centenary Ball and celebrations at Perth Oval were also held. The afternoon at Perth Oval on the same day was the site of a Naval and Military Tournament.

=== Subsequent events ===
In September, 1929, a choir of 1,000 voices sang at a Children's Thanksgiving Mass in Victoria Square, and also in a concert in His Majesty's Theatre.

On 24 November 1929, the Kings Park War Memorial Cenotaph was unveiled by the Governor William Campion to commemorate the fallen of World War I.

=== Fremantle ===
One of the events organised was a re-enactment of the 1829 arrival of settlers at Fremantle, attended by Campion.

== Prisoner remissions ==
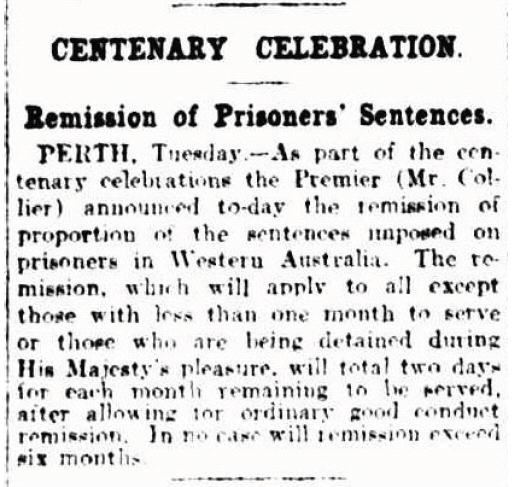
Remission of Prisoners' Sentences article

In October, Premier Philip Collier announced that prisoner sentences of more than one month would be reduced at the rate of two days for each month of sentence remaining, after allowing for good conduct. Prisoners serving sentences at His Majesty's pleasure were excluded from the remissions.

== Proximity to Depression ==
Western Australian historian Geoffrey Bolton ties in the events and the subsequent difficult times due to the economic depression in his book A Fine Country to Starve in (1972). While more recently Annette Davis looked at the popular entertainment values of the era.

== Legacy ==
A significant amount of the organisation of the celebrations was attributed to the librarian James Battye, whose efforts in organising committees were noted in the celebration year.

=== Historical Society plaques ===
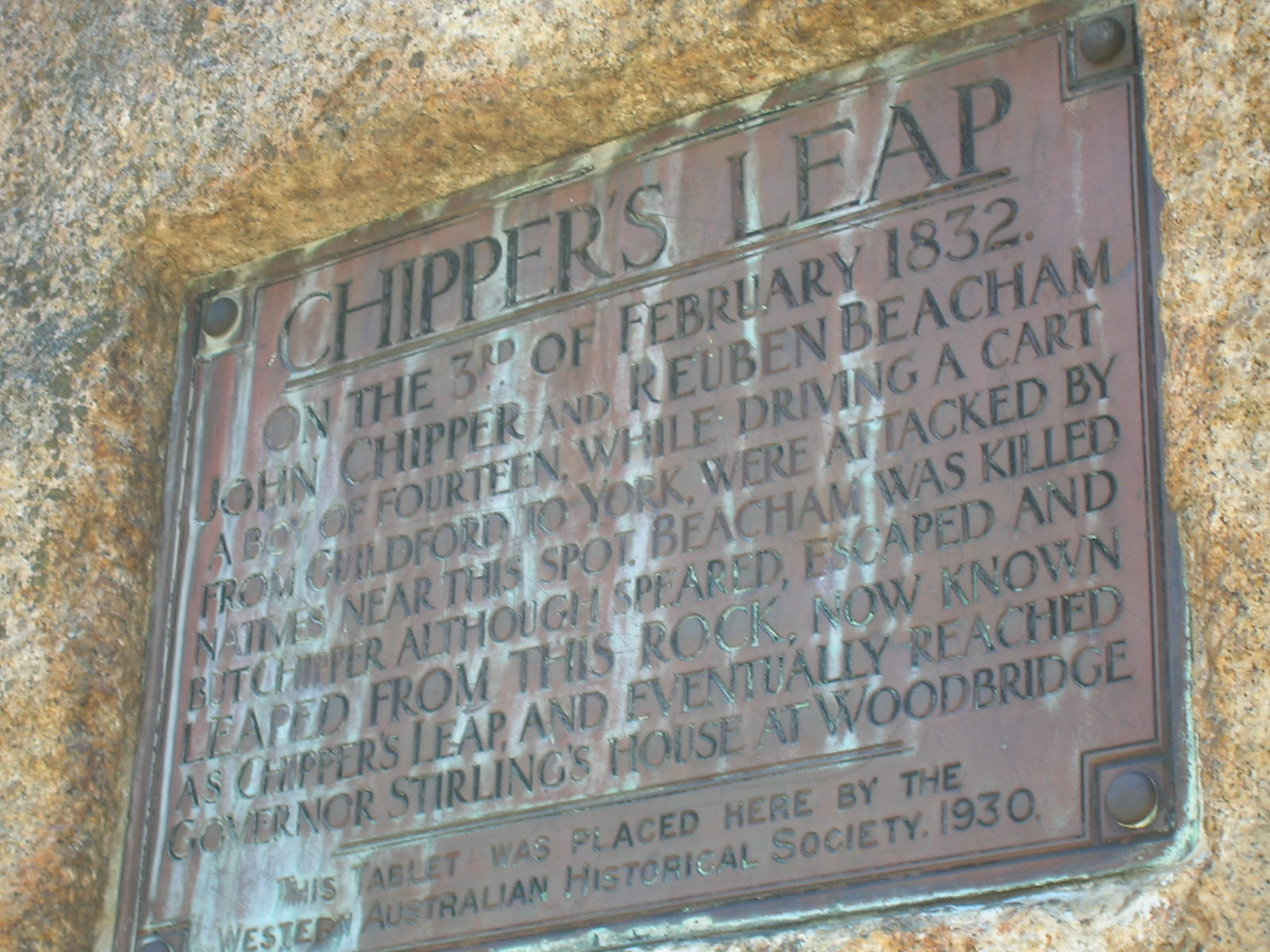
The centenary plaque on Chippers Leap

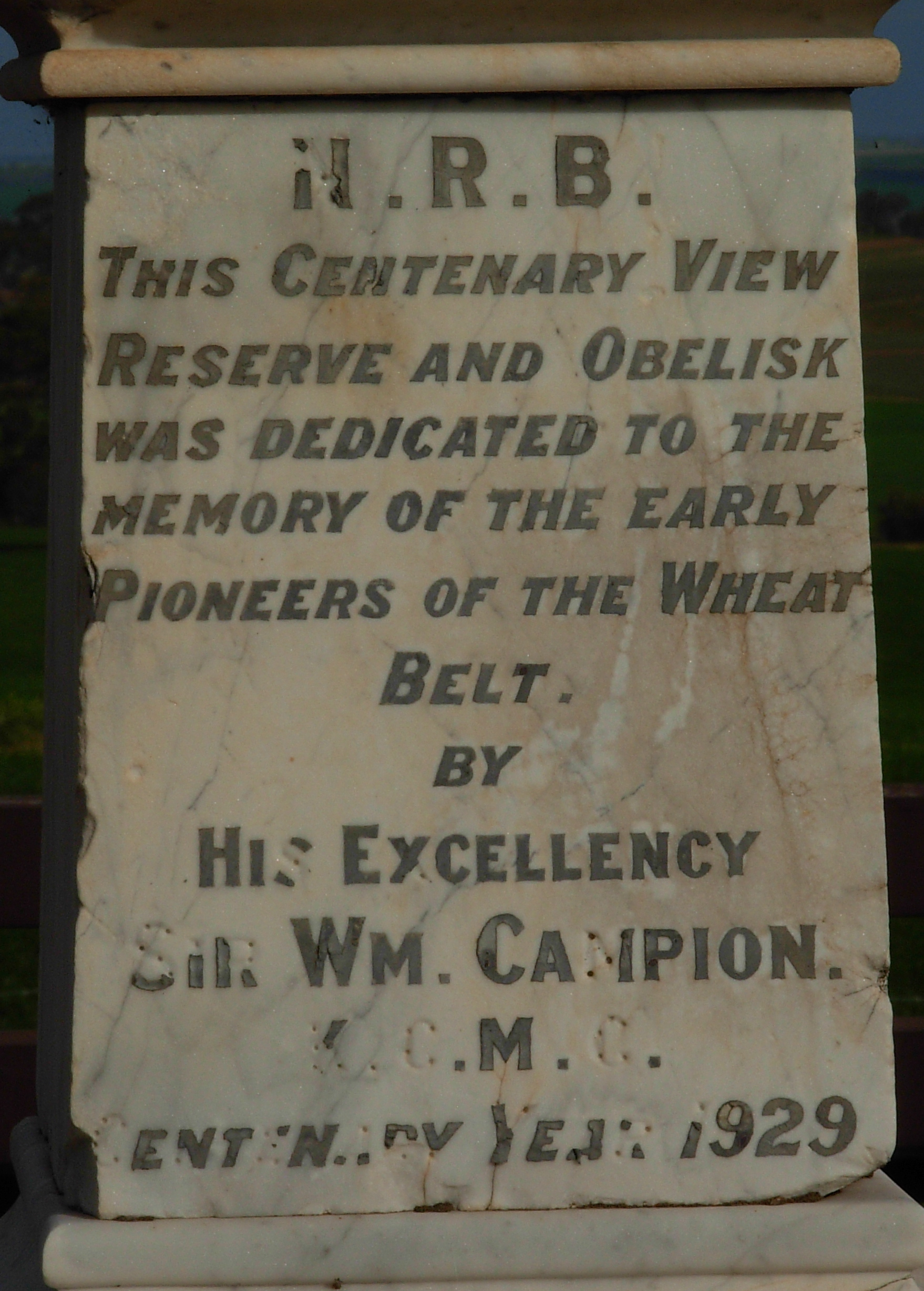
Centenary Hill plaque detail

The Royal Western Australian Historical Society commissioned plaques that were ceremonially placed upon locations of significance to Western Australia. Locations included:

- The Round House, the oldest building still standing in WA
- All Saints Church, Henley Brook, at the camp site of Captain James Stirling's furthest up-stream exploration in 1827
- Chippers Leap

=== Publications ===
- Colebatch, Hal, ed. (1929), A Story of a Hundred Years: Western Australia, 1829–1929, Perth: Frederick William Simpson, LCCN 44030436, OCLC 4738587, OL 6473881M, Wikidata Q132258106
- Kirwan, John Sir (1929), The centenary of Western Australia, s.n.
- Western Australian Centenary Celebrations. Executive Committee (1929), Souvenir programme : Western Australia's centenary, 1829–1929, Centenary Celebrations Executive Committee
- Wilson, J. Graham (1929), Western Australia's centenary 1829–1929 : first century's progress with antecedent records, 1527–1828, Historic Press

== See also ==
- Centenary of Albany, Western Australia
- The Foundation of Perth 1829, a painting depicting the founding of Perth in 1829
- Silver Centenary, a plane built in 1929–1930 and named in honour of the centenary
- WAY 79, the 1979 celebration of the 150th anniversary
- Australian Bicentenary, the national event held in 1988
- Western Australian 175th Anniversary, in 2004
