= Harold William Bennetts =

Western Australian veterinary pathologist

Harold William Bennetts CBE (18 July 1898 – 28 August 1970) was an Australian veterinary surgeon known for his ground-breaking research into diseases and pathogens of livestock, especially the toxic effects of some native Australian plants.

== Early life and education ==
Born in Carlton, Victoria. He studied veterinary science at the University of Melbourne, earning his Bachelor of Veterinary Science in 1919, and a Masters the following year. In 1921 he began working for the Commonwealth Department of Health as a bacteriologist.

== Career ==
In 1925 Bennetts took up a position as veterinary pathologist for the Western Australian Department of Agriculture. While based at Avondale Agricultural Research Station he achieved worldwide recognition for his work identifying Bacillus ovitoxicus. He was involved in developing the enterotoxaemia vaccine, for which he received a CBE.

== Awards and recognition ==
In 1957 he received the Australian Veterinary Association Gilruth Prize and his DVSc in 1931.

In conjunction with Charles Gardner, his work on the toxic effects on livestock of some Western Australian plants resulted in the highly regarded book The Toxic Plants of Western Australia being published in 1956.

== Published works ==
- Western Australia. Dept. of Agriculture. Library. H.W. Bennetts : bibliography of published works, 1923–60. held at Battye Library
