= Perth Royal Show =

Annual event in Perth, Western Australia

Royal Perth Show
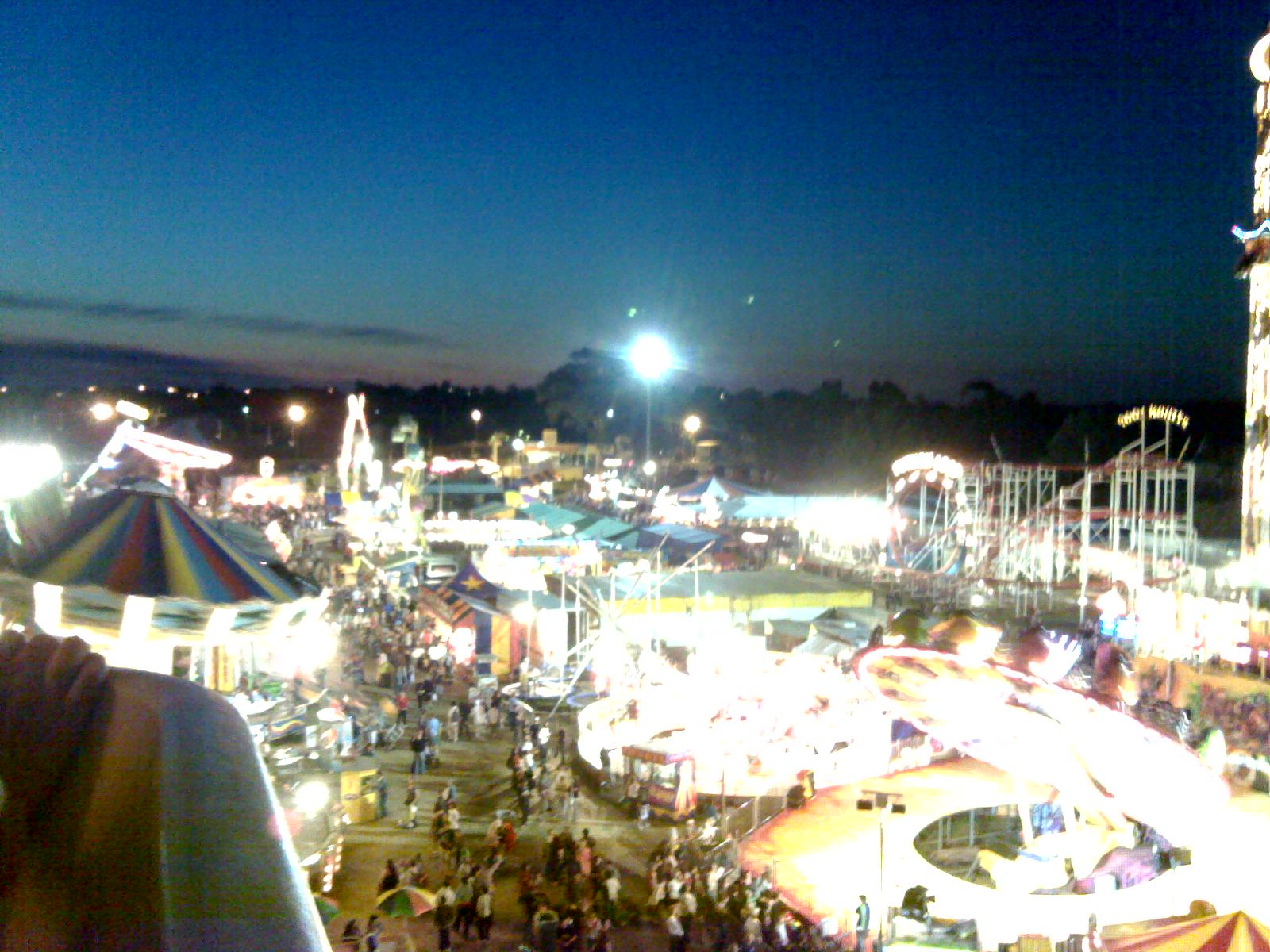
- View from a Ferris wheel of Sideshow Alley in the evening at the Perth Royal Show
- Status: Active
- Genre: Agricultural show
- Frequency: Annual
- Venue: Claremont Showground
- Country: Australia
- Inaugurated: November 1834
- Previous event: 26 September - 3 October 2026
- Next event: September 2027
- Organiser: Royal Agricultural Society of Western Australia
- Website: perthroyalshow.com.au

The Perth Royal Show is an annual agricultural show held in Perth, Western Australia at the Claremont Showground. It features informational exhibits, agricultural competitions and animal showcases, a sideshow alley and rides, and showbags. It has been held for over 100 years and is organised by the Royal Agricultural Society of Western Australia. It is held during the spring school holidays, either during the last week of September or the first week of October and at its peak, attracted attendance of around 460,000 people.

== History ==
The Royal Agricultural Society of Western Australia (RASWA) held its first Fair and Cattle Show at Guildford on 7 November 1834. It included equestrian events, sheepdog trials, woodchopping, and prizes for cattle and sheep (these events are still part of the show today). The primary purpose of the show was to showcase Western Australian industry, primarily agriculture.

The show was moved to the Claremont Showground in 1905, when it became known as the Perth Royal Show. That year 30,000 people attended. At some point a September/October timeframe to hold the show was established to align with the calendars of farmers. World War I interrupted the show between 1915 and 1918; during this time the Claremont Showgrounds were used to house and train Australian troops.

In 1929, the Centenary Pavilion was erected, making it one of Perth's largest undercover venues.

In 1940, because of World War II, the show went on a hiatus through to 1944; the military again used the Showgrounds during this period. In 1945, the return of the show was celebrated as a "Victory Show".

In October 1954, the first Showgrounds railway station opened on the north side of the Ashton Avenue road bridge.

In 1965, show attendance reached 250,000 for the first time. In 1979, Prince Philip opened the show. In celebration of WAY 79 (the sesquicentennial commemorations of European colonisation of the state), the show ran for 16 days. In 1980, Queen Elizabeth and Prince Philip visited the show.

In 1995, a new Showgrounds station was opened; it was constructed 400 metres south of the original station and was integrated with an entry plaza to the showgrounds. The 1997 show set an all-time record for attendance – 460,000 people.

In 2004, the Royal Show was named an "Icon of Western Australia" by the Western Australian government and the National Trust of Western Australia as part of the Western Australian 175th Anniversary celebrations.

In 2015, the show was attended by 353,000 people, down from 410,000 in 2014. 311,000 attended in 2016, while exhibitors cited 2017's show as "one of the worst years they have experienced" in terms of attendance. The drop in attendance during this period, mostly attributed to poor weather, led to some suggestions to move the show to a different time of the year or a new venue. The WA government's withdrawal of a subsidy that provided free tickets to children under 12 years of age also impacted attendance.

In 2020, the show, initially scheduled to start on 26 September 2020, was cancelled due to the COVID-19 pandemic in Western Australia as "implementing an appropriate COVID-19 safe plan for this year's show was not possible". The cancellation cost RASWA more than $2 million.

In 2021, the show returned, opening on 25 September 2021. The WA government contributed $4 million to help RASWA recover financially from the 2020 cancellation and to help stage a COVID-safe event. A walk-in COVID-19 vaccination clinic also operated on-site during the course of the show. The 2021 show implemented a daily 60,000 attendee cap; partially because of this the show sold out for the first time in its history on opening day.

Following years of lower-than-expected crowd numbers and disruption from the COVID-19 pandemic, the 2024 Perth Royal Show set the best attendance numbers in a decade. The show, which saw free tickets for children under the age of 15 and discounted tickets for adults offered, attracted almost 440,000 attendees across eight days. Conversely, the 2025 show resulted in the lowest attendance in 10 years, around 300,000 patrons, which was blamed on high ticket prices for adults and two days of poor weather.

In late 2025, a bill was tabled in the Parliament of Western Australia that proposed adding a new public holiday called "Show Day" which would be appointed by proclamation to coincide with the first Monday of the spring school holidays, in line with the Perth Royal Show. The bill passed in October 2026, with the new holiday not coming into effect until 2028.

== The modern show ==
=== Events and exhibits ===
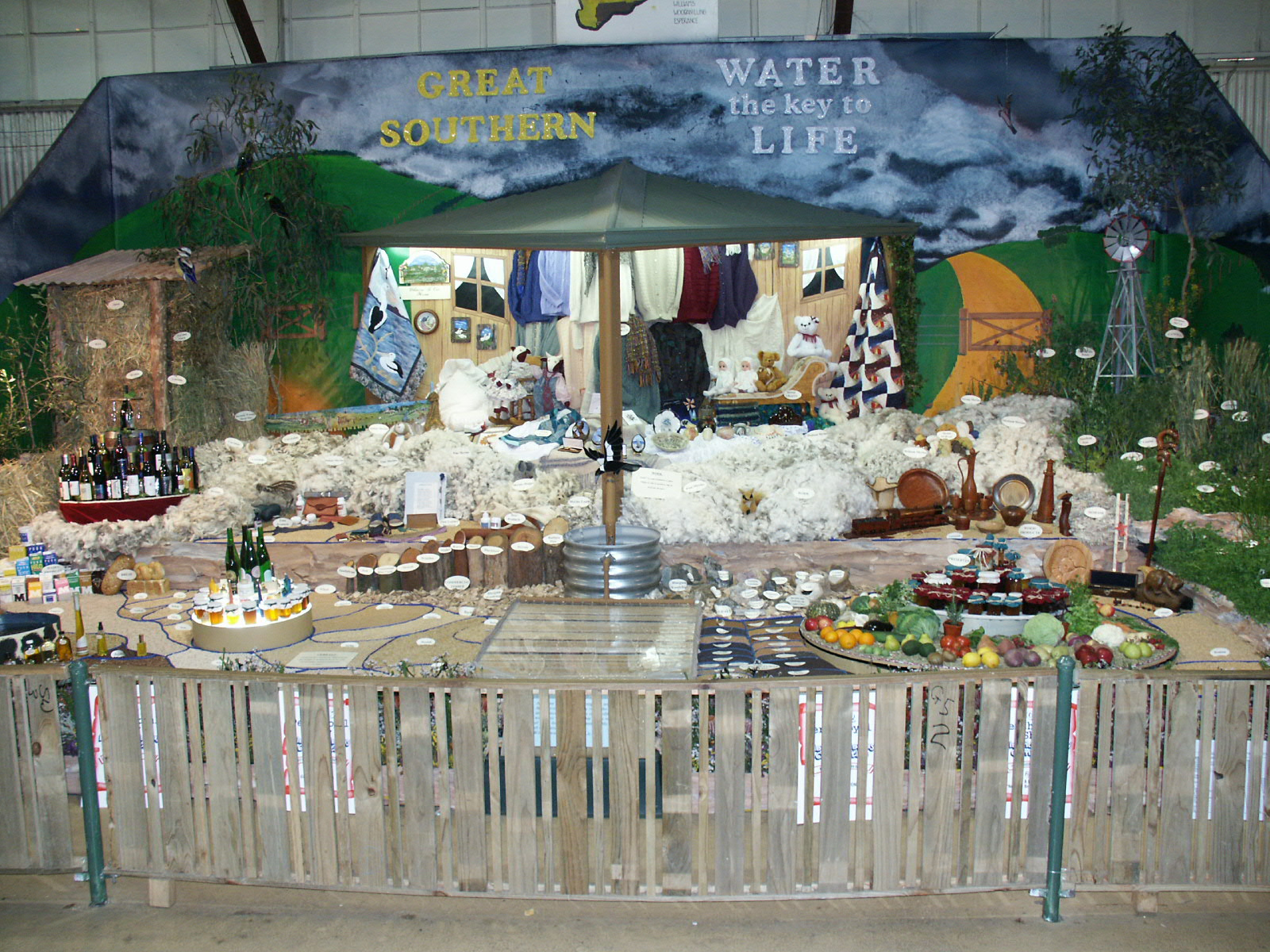
A display in a pavilion showcasing the Great Southern region

An entry fee applies to enter the show. This fee covers the show's more "traditional" events that showcase Western Australia's agricultural sector and other industries. These events at the show include:

- Various events in the main arena including woodchopping, equestrian events such as show jumping, sheepdog trials, parades, and in more recent years monster trucks, sprint car racing and freestyle motocross.
- A large number of various events held in pavilions, including animal exhibits (such as sheep, alpacas, cats, dogs, domestic poultry, pigeons, and goats), arts and crafts and cooking workshops, showcases for regional industries, and competitions in art, cuisine, and animal grooming.
- Exhibits and demonstrations by various public and private organisations such as the Western Australia Police Force, St John Ambulance Australia, Scitech, and Channel 9 Perth.

The show also features entertainment such as musical acts, roving performers, professional wrestling, and a nightly fireworks show. Although the show continues to showcase traditional events, its agricultural focus has been somewhat replaced by a commercial fairground atmosphere.

=== Showbags and Sideshow Alley ===
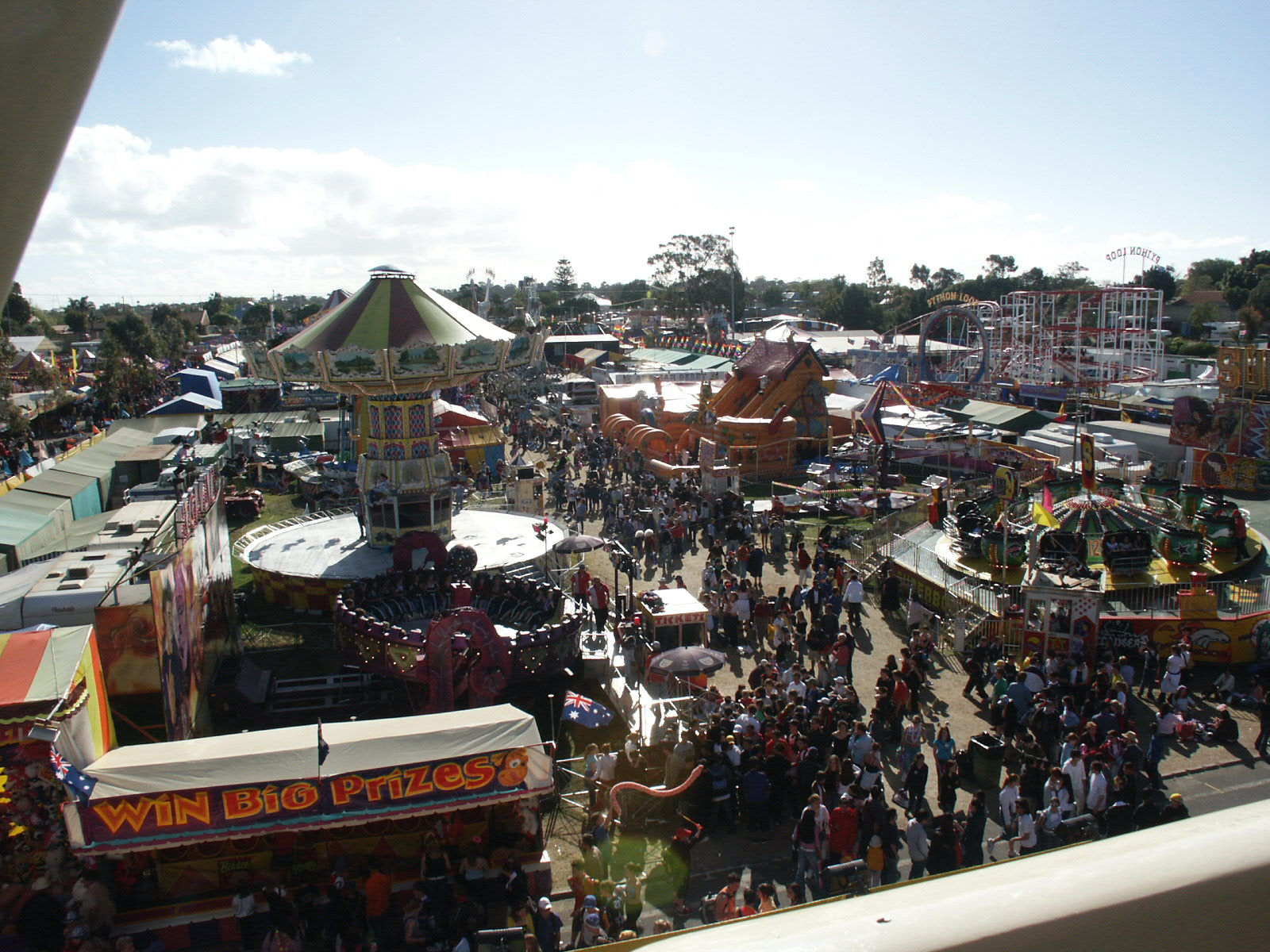
Overlooking Sideshow Alley at the Perth Royal Show in 2002

Like at other agricultural shows around Australia, showbags – themed or branded bags containing products and merchandise such as toys or confectionery – are sold at the Perth Royal Show by a number of vendors. They are a focal point of the show for many children, though some showbags (chiefly aimed at adults) can cost over $100.

The show also features an expansive area called Sideshow Alley, which hosts several amusement rides on the west side of the showground. Entry to each of the rides costs extra for attendees and is paid for at the attraction. Rides at the show usually include several haunted houses and bumper cars, a chair lift, a Ferris wheel and a number of thrill rides, and often at least one small roller coaster. Sideshow Alley also features numerous show games such as fishing, shooting, and tossing games.

=== Transport and parking ===
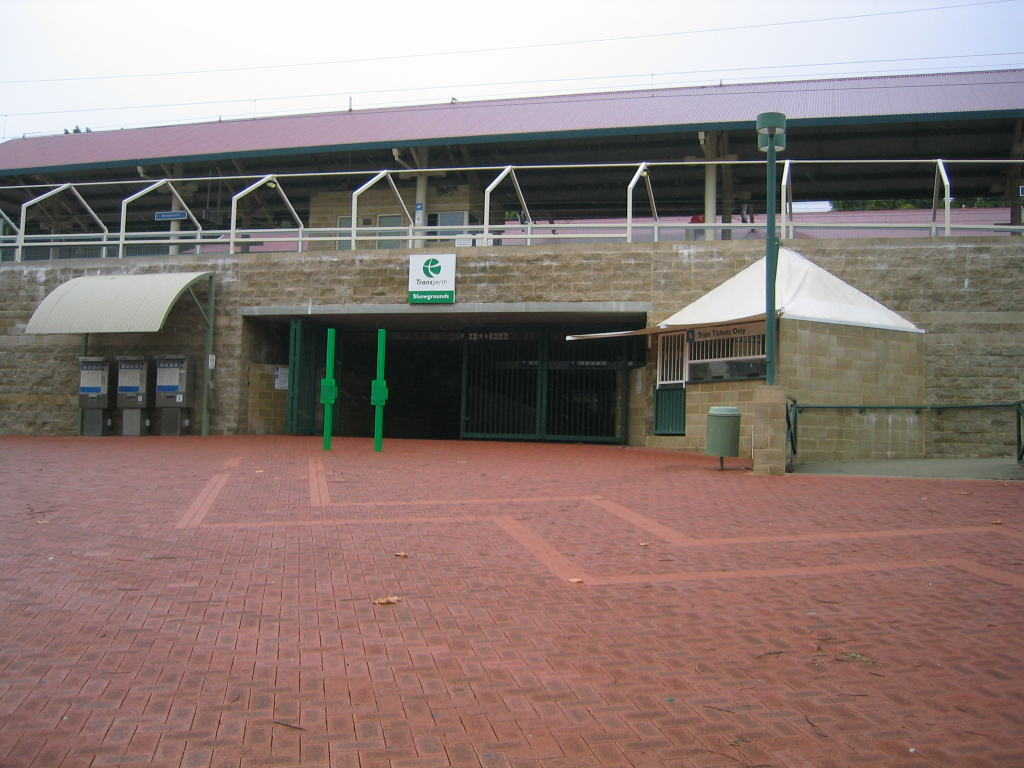
Showgrounds railway station, a common entry point to the Perth Royal Show

The show attracts several hundred thousand people each year, which usually creates problems for visitors heading to the Claremont venue, which was selected over 100 years ago and is now surrounded by residential housing. RASWA and the Town of Claremont encourage visitors to take public transport to the show if possible.

Parking at the show is notoriously difficult due to a lack of parking spaces around the Claremont area. To facilitate the increased demand for parking during the show, parking space is hired on private front lawns and school/club parking areas near to the showground. This activity is community-natured and is often organised by school children or run as a fundraiser for a school or club.

Showgrounds railway station is on the Fremantle line of the Perth public transport system, which provides transport during the show and for other major events at the showground. Transperth bus services also operate in the nearby area. A family going to the show can purchase a FamilyRider ticket from railway station ticket machines or buses.

=== Funding the show ===
The show was originally funded entirely by the Royal Agricultural Society of Western Australia. The society funds the current show, alongside the Western Australian government, visitors' entry fees, exhibitor and competitor fees, and commercial sponsorships. Despite this, the show has operated at a loss in some recent years.

In 2025, the WA state government invested $2.8 million into the show.
