= Maylands Airport =

Former airport in Western Australia

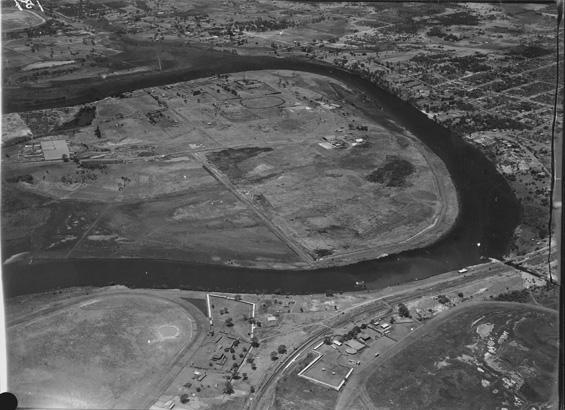
- Maylands Airport and peninsula in 1935. The top of the photo is due east, with the suburb of Rivervale on the top-right.
- Interactive map of the Maylands Airport area

General information
- Type: Airport
- Location: Maylands, Western Australia
- Coordinates: 31°57′00″S 115°54′18″E

Western Australia Heritage Register
- Type: State Registered Place
- Designated: 2 September 1998
- Reference no.: 2412

Maylands Airport (also known as Maylands Aerodrome, Maylands Airfield) on the Maylands Peninsula, in Maylands, Western Australia, was the main landing place of a significant number of record breaking flights in the early stages of flight in Australia. It was Perth's first official airport and was the birthplace of commercial aviation in Western Australia.

== History ==
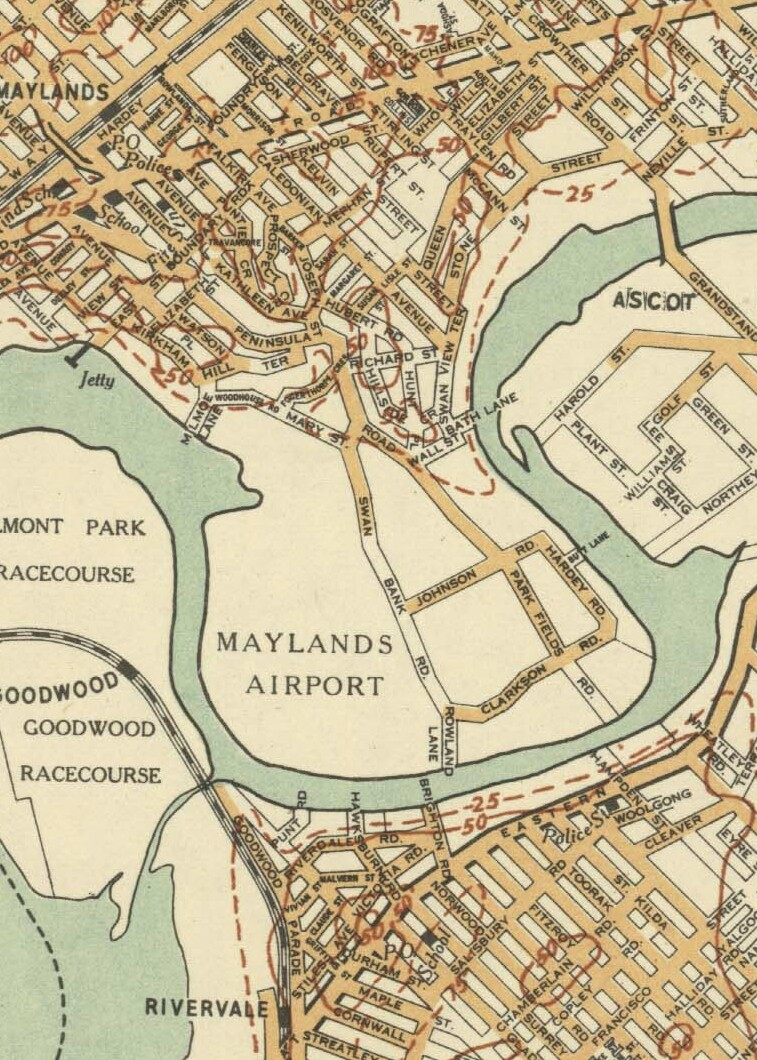
Location of Maylands Airport in 1945

On 2 November 1923, the Commonwealth acquired a 53-hectare (130-acre) site on a bend of the Swan River at Maylands for the construction of Perth's first permanent aerodrome. The Maylands aerodrome opened in 1924 and West Australian Airways immediately moved its hangar from Langley Park to the new site and commenced building another larger hangar. Other tenants included MacRobertson Miller Aviation Company, Airlines (WA) Ltd and the Royal Aero Club of Western Australia.

Charles Kingsford Smith landed at Maylands to complete the first non-stop flight across Australia. On 8 August 1928, the Southern Cross took off from Point Cook near Melbourne and set course for Perth, a distance of over 3,200 kilometres (2,000 mi).

Competitors in the Western Australian Centenary Air Race from Sydney to Perth finished the race at Maylands Airport on Sunday 7 October 1929.

During World War II the Maylands Airfield was requisitioned by the Royal Australian Air Force (RAAF). From February 1942, it was also used by the United States Army Air Forces for refuelling and aircraft ferrying purposes. Between 6 April 1942 and 5 August 1943, No. 35 Squadron, flying Avro Ansons, was based at Maylands to transport supplies and passengers to Allied units throughout Western Australia, as well as supporting the Royal Australian Navy and the Australian Army.

By the end of the 1930s, it became clear that the Maylands Aerodrome was limited in the size and speed of aircraft it was able to handle thus causing the Government to seek an alternative site for a future airport, with land being purchased at Guildford. The Perth Airport was initially used as a military airfield during the Second World War, but soon afterward it became the main airport for Perth.

Maylands continued as a base for general aviation operations, but the aerodrome was too small and the circuit conflicted with nearby Perth/Guildford. By the end of the 1950s, Department of Civil Aviation decided that Maylands should be closed and ordered all the tenants to move. The Royal Aero Club of Western Australia left Maylands on 23 April 1959 and set up operations at Perth/Guildford pending the opening of the new general aviation airport at Jandakot. The opening of Jandakot Airport in 1963 allowed Maylands to be finally closed to all operations on 30 June 1963.

== Current ==
The remaining corrugated iron and weatherboard buildings now lie within the bounds of land currently in use by Western Australian Police, and housed the Police Academy until 2002 when it was moved to a new facility in the suburb of Joondalup. Several of the surviving hangars from the aerodrome are included on the state's Register of Heritage Places.

Some of the remaining area of the airport has now been developed as a public golf course, Maylands Golf Course.

== See also ==
- List of airports in Western Australia
- Aviation transport in Australia
