= Albany Progress =

Former train in Western Australia

Overview
- Service type: Overnight passenger train
- Status: Ceased
- First service: 31 May 1961
- Last service: 1 December 1978
- Former operators: WAGR (1961-1975); Westrail (1975-1978)

Route
- Termini: Perth; Albany
- Distance travelled: 547 kilometres
- Service frequency: 3 x weekly
- Train number: 7/8
- Lines used: Eastern; Great Southern

The Albany Progress was an overnight passenger train operated by the Western Australian Government Railways between Perth and Albany via the Eastern and Great Southern lines from May 1961 until December 1978.

== History ==
The Albany Progress commenced operating on 31 May 1961, when the long-standing service between Perth and Albany was relaunched with refurbished rolling stock hauled by X class diesel locomotives. Typically there were three overnight return services a week. In the late 1960s, Albany bound services operated on Sunday, Tuesday and Thursday, returning to Perth on Monday, Wednesday and Friday.

From 7 November 1964, an additional service operated as the Albany Weekender departing Perth on Friday night, returning on Sunday night using the stock from The Midlander. it ceased on 1 August 1975. The Albany Progress last ran from Albany on 1 December 1978, hauled by preserved steam locomotive W947 as far as Elleker. It was the last regular overnight passenger train to run on the WAGR system and was replaced by a road coach service.

The train consisted of passenger sleeping berths and sit-up facilities, as well as wagons for general freight which were often shunted off the train at various towns.

Eight surplus coaches were leased and later sold to the Hotham Valley Railway and still run on the mainline today.

== Sources ==
- Higham, Geoffrey (2007). Marble Bar to Mandurah: A History of Passenger Rail Services in Western Australia (1st ed.). Bassendean: Rail Heritage WA. ISBN 978-0-9803922-0-3. OCLC 271545712. Wikidata Q140375689.
