= The Midlander (Western Australian Government Railways) =

Overnight rail passenger service in Western Australia

Overview
- Service type: Overnight passenger train
- Status: Ceased
- First service: 2 September 1964
- Last service: 28 July 1975
- Former operator: Western Australian Government Railways

Route
- Termini: Perth; Geraldton
- Average journey time: 12 hours
- Service frequency: Weekly
- Train number: 3/4
- Line used: Midland

The Midlander was an overnight passenger train operated by the Western Australian Government Railways between Perth and Geraldton via the Midland line from September 1964 until July 1975.

== History ==
The Midlander commenced operating on 2 September 1964 between Perth and Geraldton shortly after the purchase of the Midland Railway Company by the Western Australian Government Railways. It ceased on 28 July 1975, being replaced by road coaches.

The northbound service operated on a Wednesday night, returning south on Thursday night. It was operated with refurbished Western Australian Government Railways carriages painted maroon and ivory. These were used on weekends on the Albany Weekender.</ref>

== Sources ==
- Higham, Geoffrey (2007). Marble Bar to Mandurah: A History of Passenger Rail Services in Western Australia (1st ed.). Bassendean: Rail Heritage WA. ISBN 978-0-9803922-0-3. OCLC 271545712. Wikidata Q140375689.
