= Avondale Agricultural Research Station =

Farm and research location in Western Australia

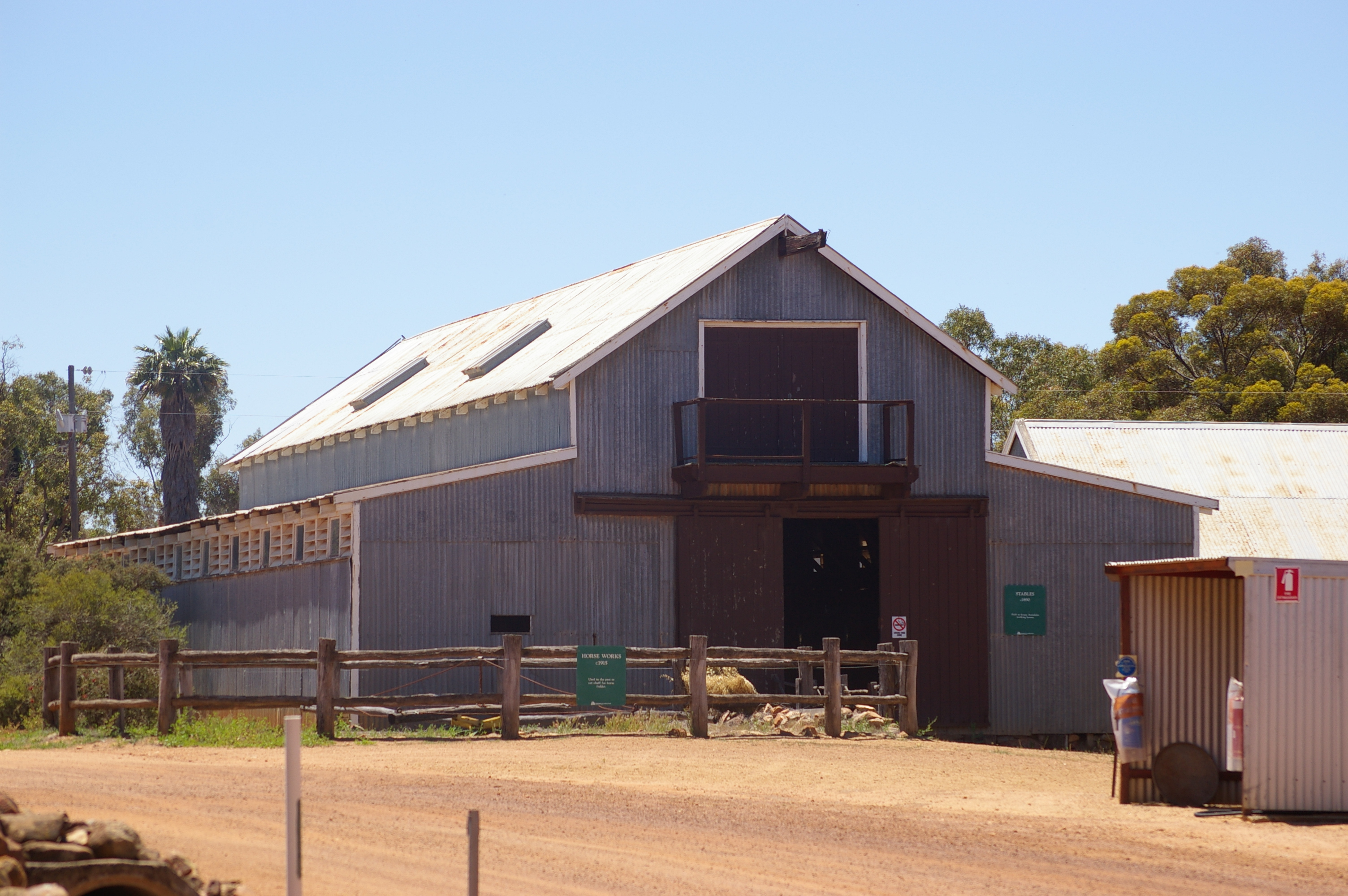
- The heritage listed stables built around 1890

- Location within Western Australia

General information
- Type: Research Station
- Location: Beverley, Western Australia
- Coordinates: 32°7′00″S 116°52′07.9″E

Western Australia Heritage Register
- Designated: 19 March 2004
- Reference no.: 5566

Avondale Agricultural Research Station or Avondale Discovery Farm is one of thirteen research farms and stations operated by Western Australia's Department of Agriculture and Food. In addition to its research, Avondale has historical buildings, a farming equipment museum and operates as an agriculture education centre specialising in introducing primary school children to farming, and teaching of its history in Western Australia.

Avondale is situated on land where the Dale River joins the Avon River 6.2 kilometres (3.9 mi) west of Beverley. It is located on land originally granted to the first Governor of Western Australia, Captain (later Admiral Sir) James Stirling and Captain Mark Currie RN in 1836. These grants were combined in 1849 and with additional land purchases they became known as Avondale Estate, expanding to in excess of 13,330 acres (53.9 km^{2}).

On 4 April 1924 the remaining 1,740 acres (7.0 km^{2}) of Avondale were passed on to the Department of Agriculture and Food. Initially Avondale continued its involvement with the Group Settlement Scheme, it was not until 1926 that research activities commenced. During the 1930s it was to be the laboratory for Dr Harold Bennetts successful research into Bacillus ovitoxicus. As part of Western Australia's 1979 sesquicentennial celebrations a machinery museum was built and the other buildings were restored to original condition.

Today, Avondale is managed by the National Trust of Western Australia and is open to the public at varying times throughout the year.

== Early farm years ==
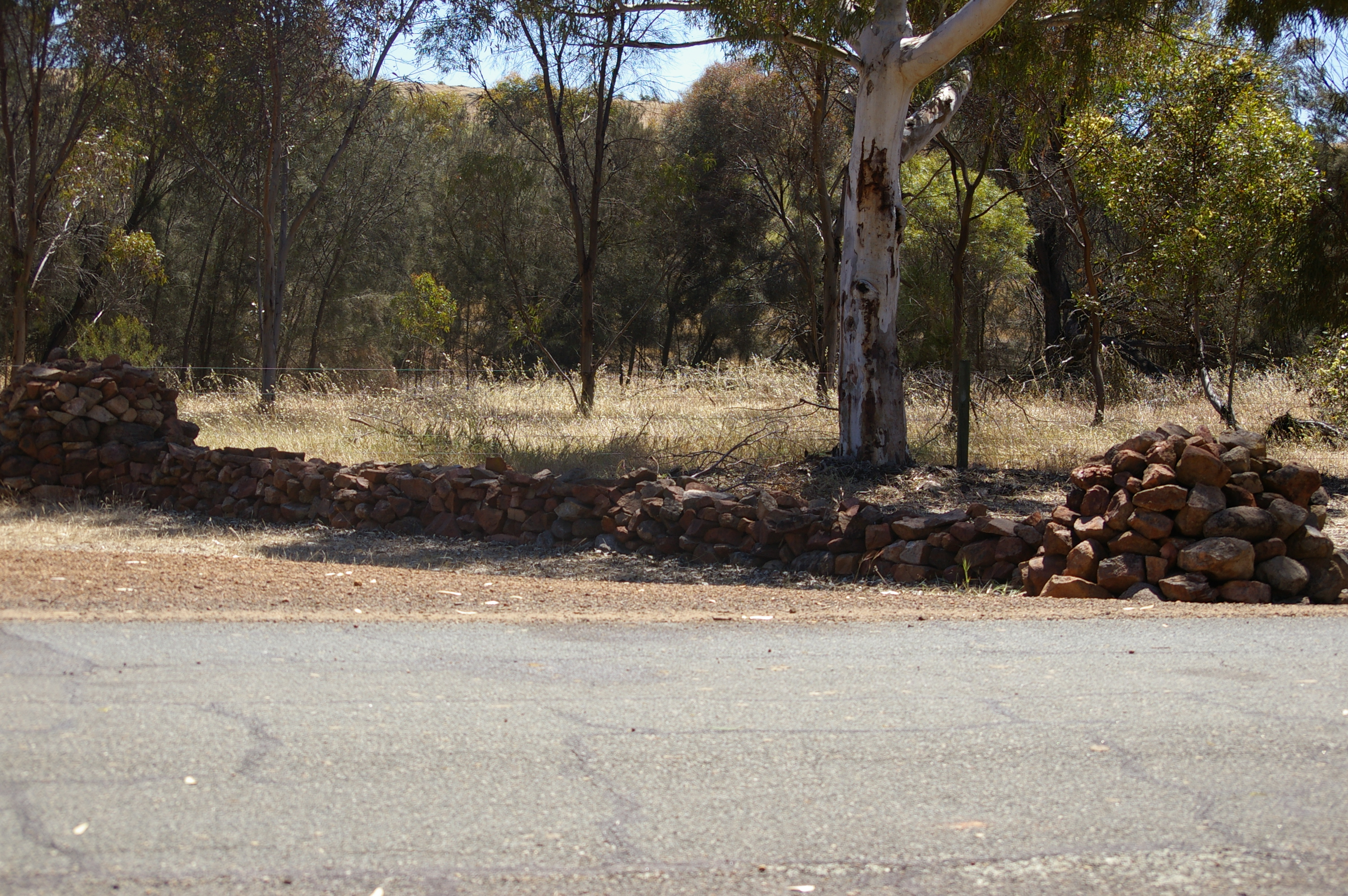
Original boundary between the properties granted to Currie and Stirling; the wall was built in 1978

In November 1835, an expedition led by Governor James Stirling joined another party led by the Surveyor General John Septimus Roe in King George Sound. Roe had made arrangement for both parties to return to the Swan River Colony via an alternative route. The route was intended to join the settlements of King George Sound, York and the Swan River Colony along with the newly established settlement of Williams. This expedition passed through the area of Avondale sighting the Dale River and a granite hill that Roe name Bald Hill on 27 December. Bald Hill was to become the primary reference point for surveying the region.

In 1836, the surveyor Thomas Watson returned to area and used Bald Hill as the principal trigonometric reference. Watson was to map out a number of lots in the area including the western boundary for Beverley town site. Two of the lots surveyed were Avon location 14 with 5,000 acres (20 km^{2}), and Avon location K with 4,000 acres (16 km^{2}); location 14 was given to Captain Mark Currie, Fremantle Harbour Master, while location K was given to Stirling. Stirling as Governor and Currie as harbour master were not paid salaries by the colony but given land grants as compensation for their services. In 1978, surveyors using current equipment were engaged to determine the exact location of these original holdings, and commented on the remarkable accuracy of Watson's survey 142 years before.

Currie sold his grant of land to a Nicholas Carey in September 1838 for £330, equivalent to A$43,075 in 2022. Carey entered into a lease agreement in December with Governor Stirling for his grant, which included Carey purchasing the property at the end of the lease for £750 in 1846. Carey also purchased 3,000 acres (12 km^{2}) to west of location 14 he also received an additional grant of land in 1849. With all the land in the vee formed by the Avon River and the Dale River the property was now 13,330 acres (53.9 km^{2}) in size and was named Avondale Estate. During the late 1840s Carey moved to Guernsey leaving Avondale to be operated by an unknown caretaker.

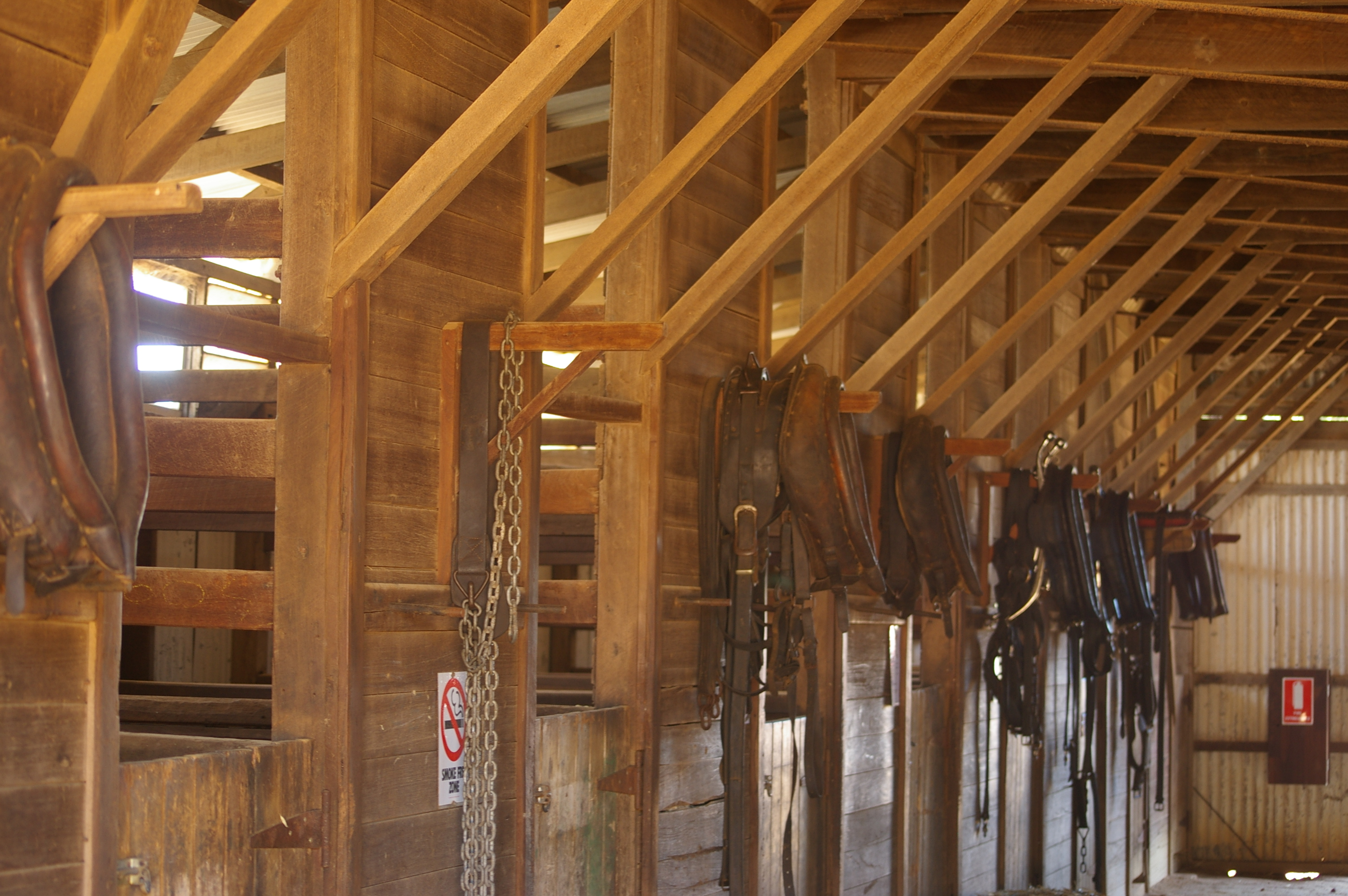
Inside the stables at Avondale

Upon Carey's death in March 1889, Avondale was inherited by his 16-year-old grand nephew William Herbert deLisle. deLisle arrived and took up residence there in 1893, and assumed the land title in 1894. Avondale had been a pastoral property until deLisle's arrival, over the next ten years sections of the estate were sold off to fund its development. During this period, the house was expanded and the stable built, which included 20 horse stalls with hollow walls and an overhead loft. The hollow walls enable feed from the loft to gravitate directly to the feed bins in each stall.

The remaining 5,232 acres (21.2 km^{2}) were sold to William James Butcher and Charles John Hunt Butcher in 1904. The brothers purchased adjoining properties adding 4,403 acres (17.8 km^{2}) which enlarged Avondale to 9,635 acres (39.0 km^{2}). In 1908 they offered to sell Avondale to the Western Australian Government for £5/10/- per acre. The Government countered with an offer of £5/5/- per acre, which was accepted. Avondale was purchased in March 1910 under the Agricultural Land Purchase act for a total of £51,494/12/6, equivalent to A$5,872,240.26 in 2022.

=== 1910 to 1924 ===
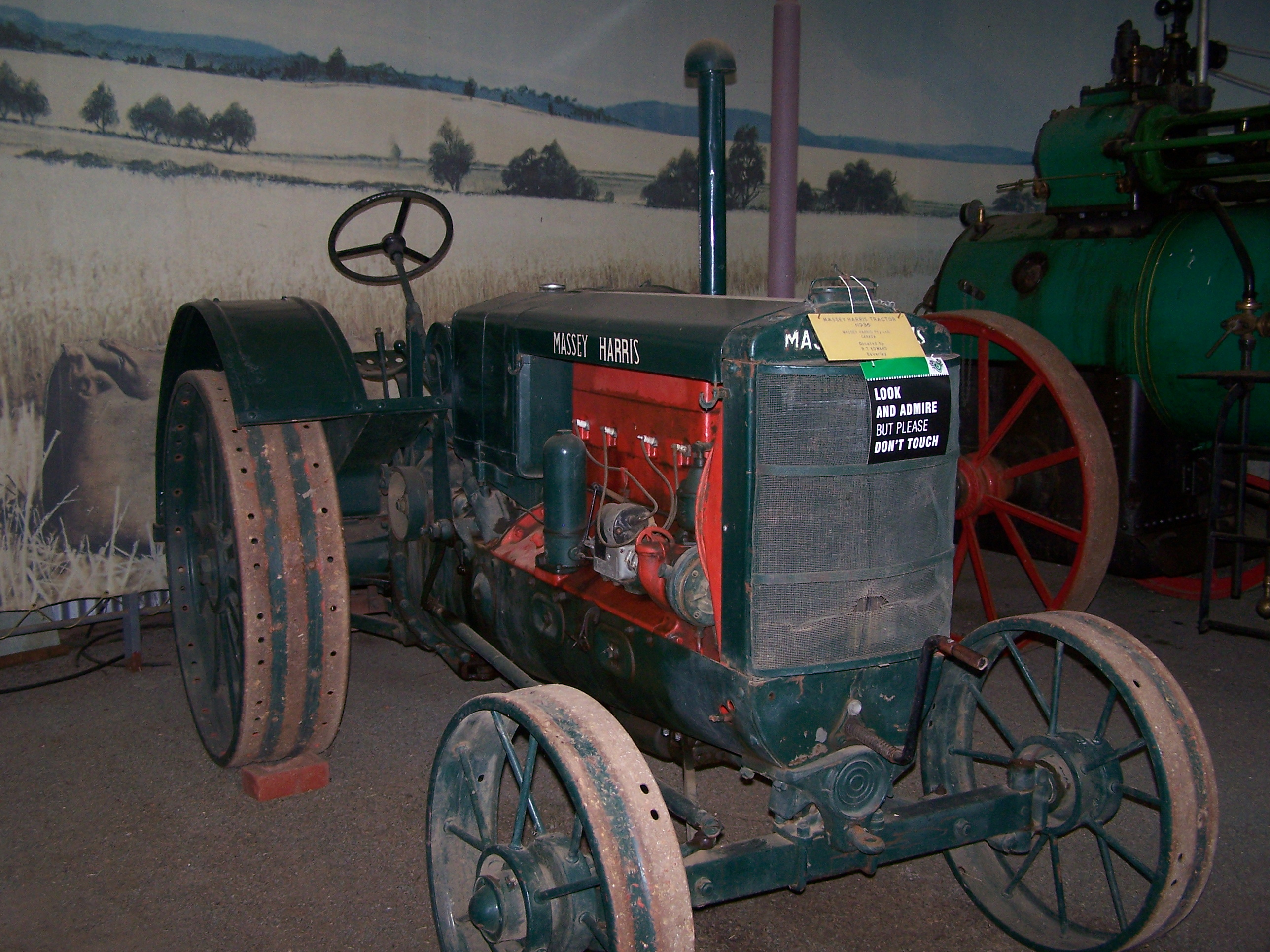
A display in the museum

Even though the Butcher brothers' farming operations continued until January 1911, the government began preparations for subdivision. John Hall was sent to Avondale in April 1910 to locate all improvements and draw subdivision lines following existing fencing where possible. His arrival sparked considerable controversy, because not only had he set up camp on the golf course but the golf club also had leased 40 acres (160,000 m^{2}) of Avondale that joined the edge of town. Investigations found that the lease was terminated when the land was sold.

Hall divided Avondale into nine substantial size farms whose boundaries have remained unchanged since, the 40 acres (160,000 m^{2}) that had been occupied by the golf course was made into small lots which have since been further subdivided. Lands Department accountants calculated that the sale of the lots would return £8,768/3/3 after expenses, and the estate was gazetted and land made available on 21 December 1910. Of the nine substantial lots only four were taken up as settlers were unable to pay the £6 per acre price. Lot 1 was taken up by George Hancock, the father of mining magnate Lang Hancock, and George's brother Richard took up Lot 2. Lot 13 was taken up by G.W. Isbister, and Lot 4 was taken up by former Premier Sir Newton Moore, who then proceeded to London with the plans. As Agent General Newton was to offer to prospective settlers lots at Avondale, although a number telegram inquiries to ascertain availability of lots at Avondale were sent, there is no record any lots being allocated in London.

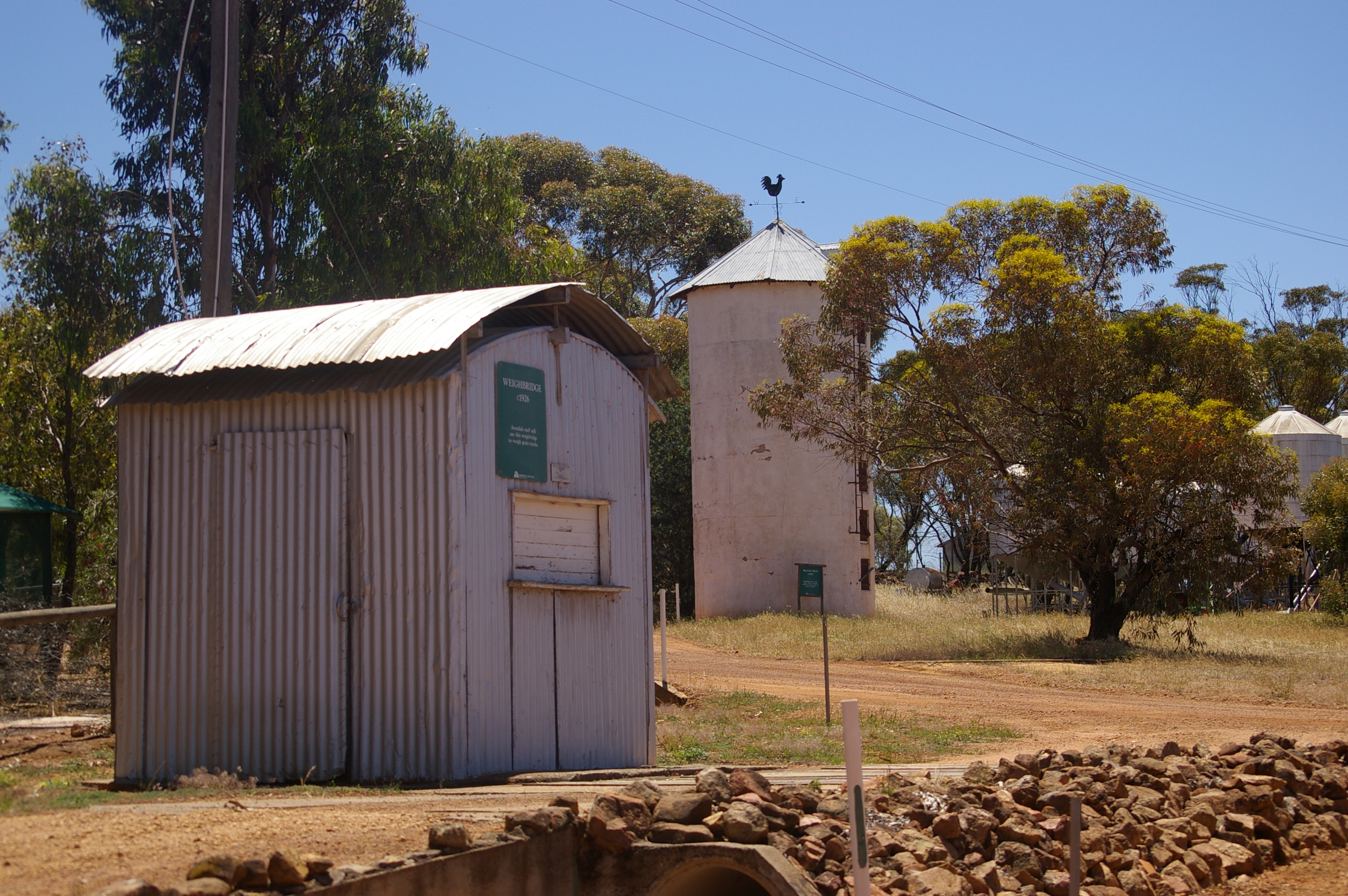
The heritage listed weighbridge c. 1936 in foreground with the heritage listed c. 1927 silo behind

As none of the remaining 5 substantial lots had been taken up by November 1911, it was suggested that 4 of those remaining be used for an Agricultural College with the Lands Department responsible for continuing to farm the remaining lots. This left one lot known as Drumclyer available, in 1914 a Dowerin farmer tried to lease Drumclyer after losing his property there from drought, but was unable to negotiate an acceptable rate. In December, the Hancock brothers had abandoned lots 1 & 2, Isbister had also abandoned Lot 13, although it is not known exactly when, leaving only the 780 acres (3.2 km^{2}) of Lot 4 in private hands. With the outbreak of World War I the Agricultural College plans were abandoned as well.

Near the end of 1916, the Beverley community requested that Avondale be subdivided into 20 lots for returning soldiers. It was also suggested that Avondale be a nursery where soldiers are given small allotments and those that succeed are then given larger grants elsewhere in the state. In July 1918, it was decided that Avondale would have 6 lots made available for servicemen from the Beverley area and that 1,740 acres (7.0 km^{2}) which included the area around the homestead was to remain under control of the Lands Department.

== Department of Agriculture ==
The original homestead block faced an uncertain future for many years, until it was given to the Department of Agriculture in 1924. Initially intended for the production of pure seed wheat and oats, very little was produced for several years. Avondale was used as an assembly and holding ground for dairy cattle, prior to them being sent to group settlers in the state's South West. During this period, the silo was built with a capacity of 100 tonnes; the silo is now heritage listed.

The local farming community raised concerns about cattle being unsuitable for the area, while the concerns were not immediately addressed Avondale was turned towards seed production and research. The first research began in 1926; this was in the application of superphosphate its alternatives and the timing of application. Initial results were published in the Journal of Agriculture in 1927.

=== Research ===
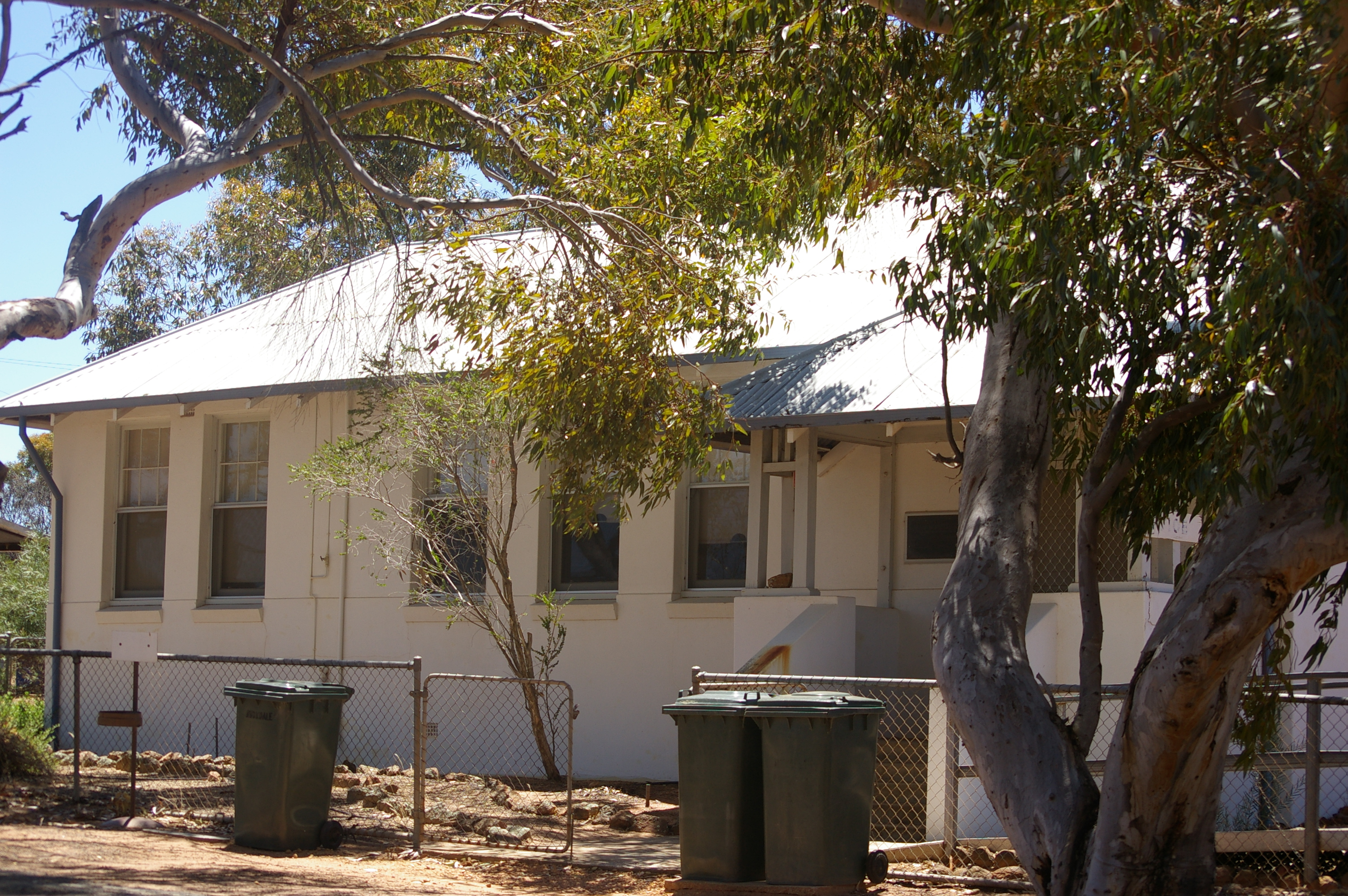
The heritage list laboratory built for Dr Bennetts' research

A Braxy-like disease originated in the Beverley-York region in 1915. Over the next 15 years it spread across most of the state's farming districts. Flock losses generally were around 5% though there were reported cases of 30% loss. In 1918 Professor Dakin of the University of Western Australia identified the disease as a toxaemia of bacterial origin but was unable to establish the source.

Dr Harold Bennetts was appointed the state's first veterinary pathologist in May 1925. Bennetts commenced an immediate investigation into the disease, using alleyways and open space around the department's city offices to house the sheep needed for the research. In 1930 a field laboratory was built at Avondale; a flock of 1000 sheep were purchased to enable feed experiments. In 1931 Bennetts had identified Bacillus ovitoxicus as the cause of the disease. With this knowledge he was able to develop the infectious enterotoxaemia vaccine; for his efforts Bennetts received a CBE.

The sheep populations that were required by Bennetts at Avondale also afforded additional research opportunities. From 1931 for several years experiments were conducted with the object of determining how to best produce prime export lambs. This investigated various breeds and cross breeds determining that cross-bred ewes where significantly more productive than pure-bred Merinos.

In 1934, Bennetts teamed with state botanist Charles Gardner to study the toxic effect of native plants species on sheep. Gardner would collect the plants and supply them fresh to Bennetts who would then feed them to the sheep. They confirmed 24 species of plants as being poisonous, most which were from the native pea genera Gastrolobium and Oxylobium. Based on this and later research, Gardner and Bennetts published The Toxic Plants of Western Australia in 1956. During 1935, investigations into the effects of castrating male lambs with either mechanical pincers compared to using a knife, both of these methods have since been replaced with rubber elastrator rings. The experiment on 499 sheep concluded that no significant differences were observable in respect of mortality, maturity rates and meat quality.

Dr Eric Underwood began his research at Avondale in the mid-1930s also utilising the sheep flocks. Underwood's initial research was into the effects of sulfur on wool growth, he followed that research with investigations into botulism in sheep during 1935. These experiments were the first of many by Underwood over the next 30 years. During the 1940s he studied the nutritional value of hay and pasture for sheep, the ongoing results from these Studies in Cereal Hay production in Western Australia were published in the Journal of Agriculture.

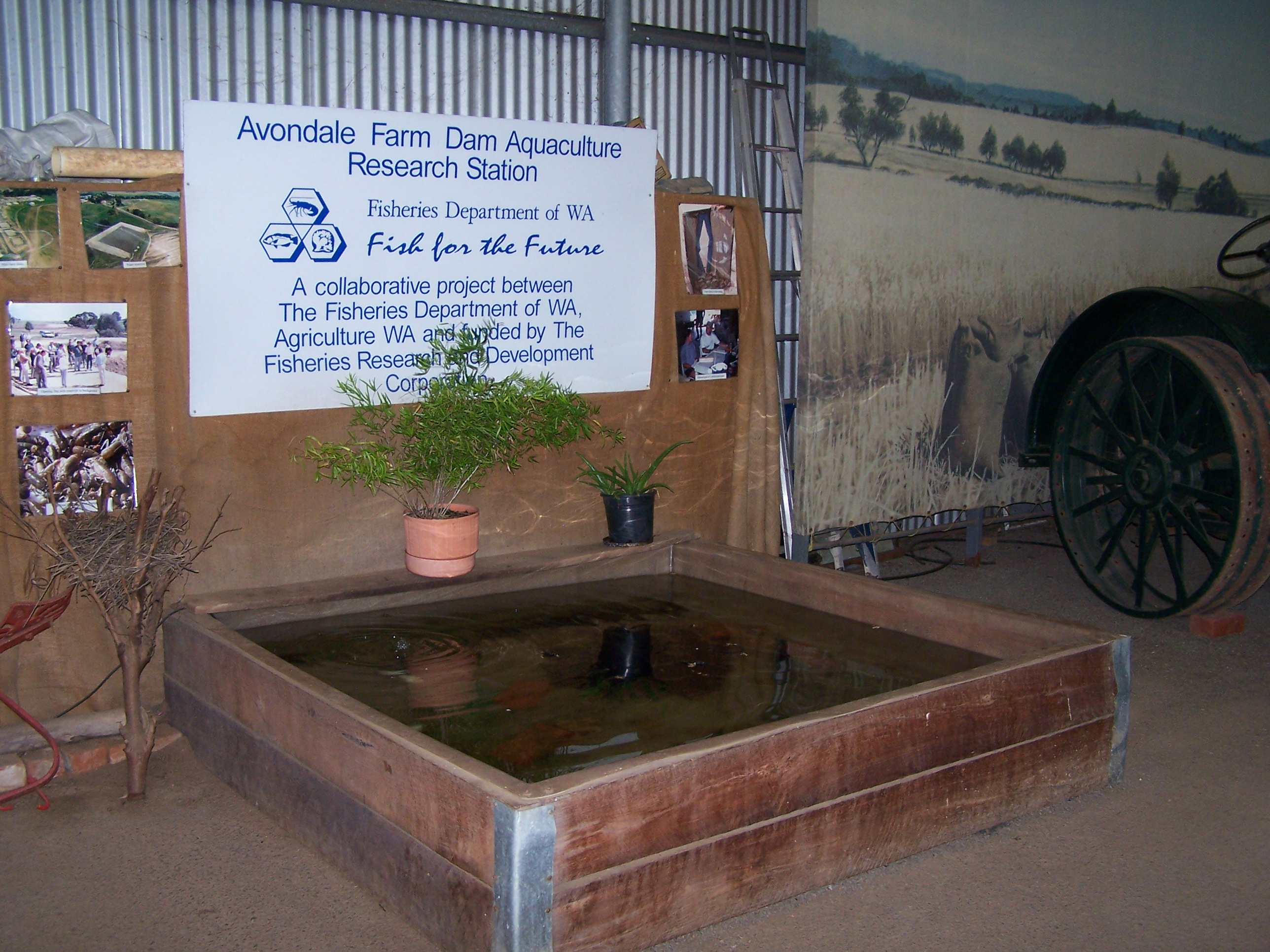
Aquaculture as an income supplement, this display is inside the machinery shed

During World War II, Avondale farm provided research into farming of linseed and flax in Western Australia, although it was not the most suitable location for growing either. Three varieties of Linseed were trialled: Riga Crown, an early maturing variety, Italian also early maturing and Walsh, a mid-season maturing variety. It was discovered that all were susceptible to cutworm with greater damage occurring later in the season; early trails of the insecticide DDT was said to show promising results in combating this.

=== Other efforts ===
In 1942 there was some pioneering in the development and use of contour banks, the equipment required a team 4 horses or two Clydesdales, a teamster and two labourers. Through the 1950s Avondale had monitored its sheep flocks as part of the research into Dwalganup strain of clover as a livestock feed and its effect on ewe fertility. On into the 1960s and 1970s Avondale was involved with the breeding and trial of various cereal crops for use within Western Australia. Since the early 1980s Avondale has focused on environmental and sustainable farming along with farm income supplemental alternatives like marron farming.

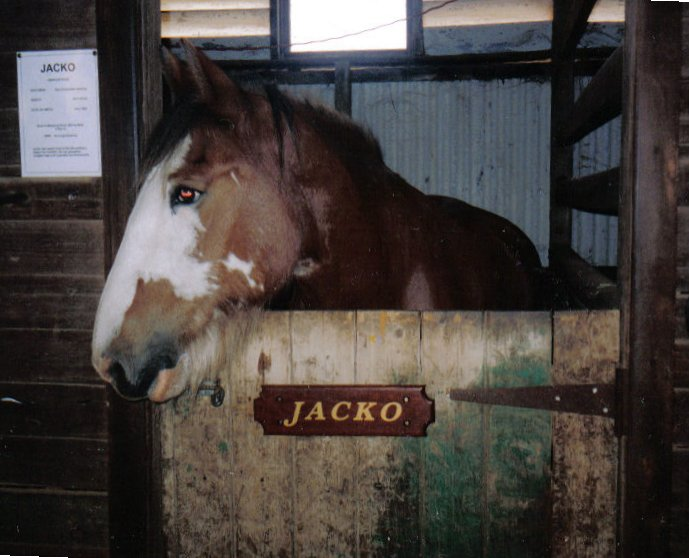
The Clydesdale known as Jacko who retired to a farm near Northam in December 2005

Avondale like most Western Australian farms utilised horses and Clydesdales in particular for pulling farming equipment. Farm economics of the 1930s meant that the Clydesdales weren't retired to enjoy the governments grassy paddocks. In 1937 a letter to the Agricultural minister details the disposal of horses that were no longer useful;

With regard to the two horses at the station which are old and incapable of any further work. I request approval for these animals, instead of being destroyed at the station, to be made available to the Zoo authorities for lions food...

— Farm manager, 1937 correspondence

The letter details how the Perth Zoo is responsible for the freight and that the Minister had approved the transaction. Many Clydesdales were to follow the first two bay mares with the consignment note description "for lions food, freight payable by consignee". This practice continued until well into the 1950s until tractors replaced the use of horses in farming. Since the opening of the museum in 1978 Avondale again utilised Clydesdales for demonstrations of the old equipment these horse are sold as pets once they are incapable of working.

=== 1976 to present ===
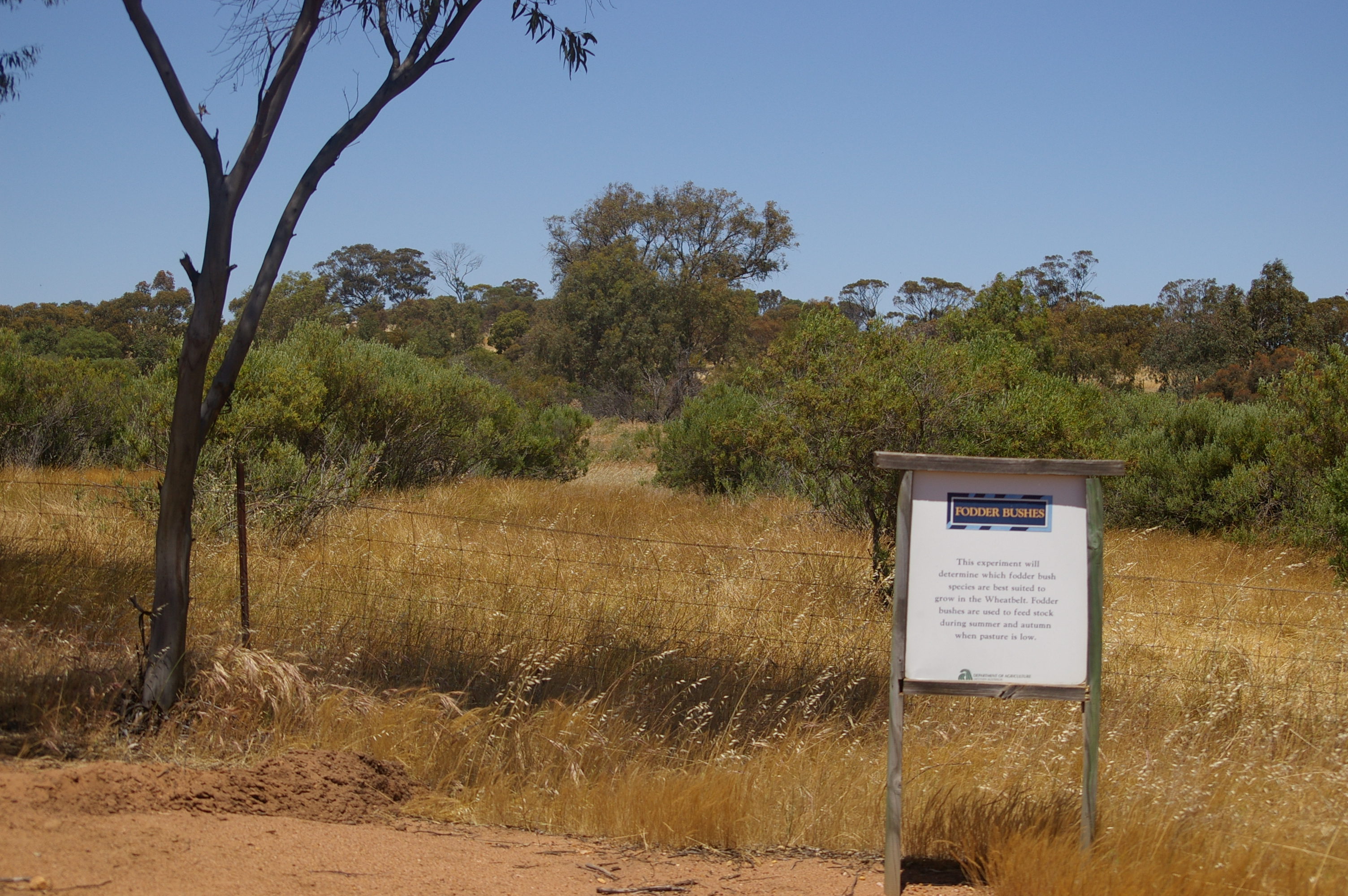
Paddock description signage; this one is currently being used for research into various Atriplex (saltbush) species for use as fodder

In 1976, as part of the preparations for Western Australia's 1979 sesquicentennial celebrations, the Department of Agriculture decided to restore the historic Avondale farm to its original state to display the achievements of Western Australian farmers. In response to the announcement, farmers from around the state responded generously with donations of old machinery and equipment. Most of this machinery was restored by Department of Agriculture mechanics. In 1978 an invitation to visit and open Avondale's agricultural displays was sent to Prince Charles, this was accepted and on 16 March 1979 Avondale was officially opened with commemorative tree planting near the entrance to the farm.

The farm continues its research into improving farming and farm practices under Western Australian conditions. Avondale's displays are open to the public with picnic facilities available, included in the displays are the original homestead, the stables complete with Clydesdales and a machinery shed. There is also road maintained around the farm with information boards on each paddock explaining its current usage.

== See also ==
- Agricultural science
- Agriculture
