= Albany railway station, Western Australia =

Former railway station in Western Australia

Albany railway station
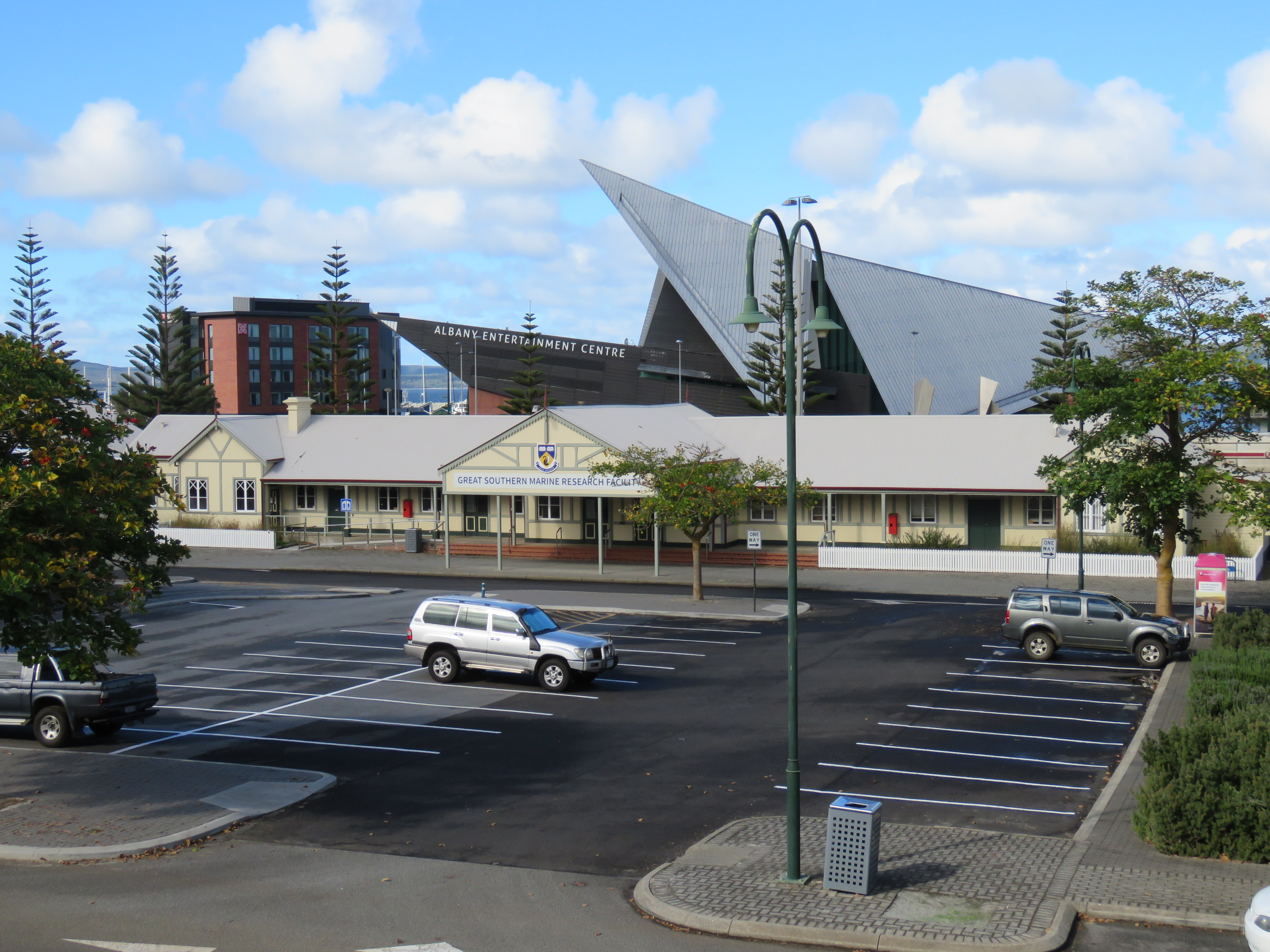
- The Albany railway station with the Albany Entertainment Centre in the background
- Interactive map of the Albany railway station area

General information
- Type: Heritage listed railway station
- Location: Albany, Western Australia
- Coordinates: 35.0280°S 117.8859°E

Western Australia Heritage Register
- Type: State Registered Place
- Designated: 11 August 2009
- Reference no.: 3262

Albany railway station is a railway station in Albany, Western Australia.

== History and overview ==
It was constructed in 1888 by the Great Southern Land Company.

It was a passenger railway station on the Western Australian Government Railways services, from 1961 until the end of the running of the Albany Progress in 1978.

It is often included in pictures of Stirling Terrace and of the jetties and facilities of the Port of Albany.

Following reduction in rail services, various proposals were investigated, and the railway station precinct was assessed for heritage status.

The station is both a heritage listed structure, and it was a tourist information centre and Transwa bus terminal.

== See also ==
- Old Bunbury railway station
