= Brigadoon, Western Australia =

Brigadoon
- Suburb
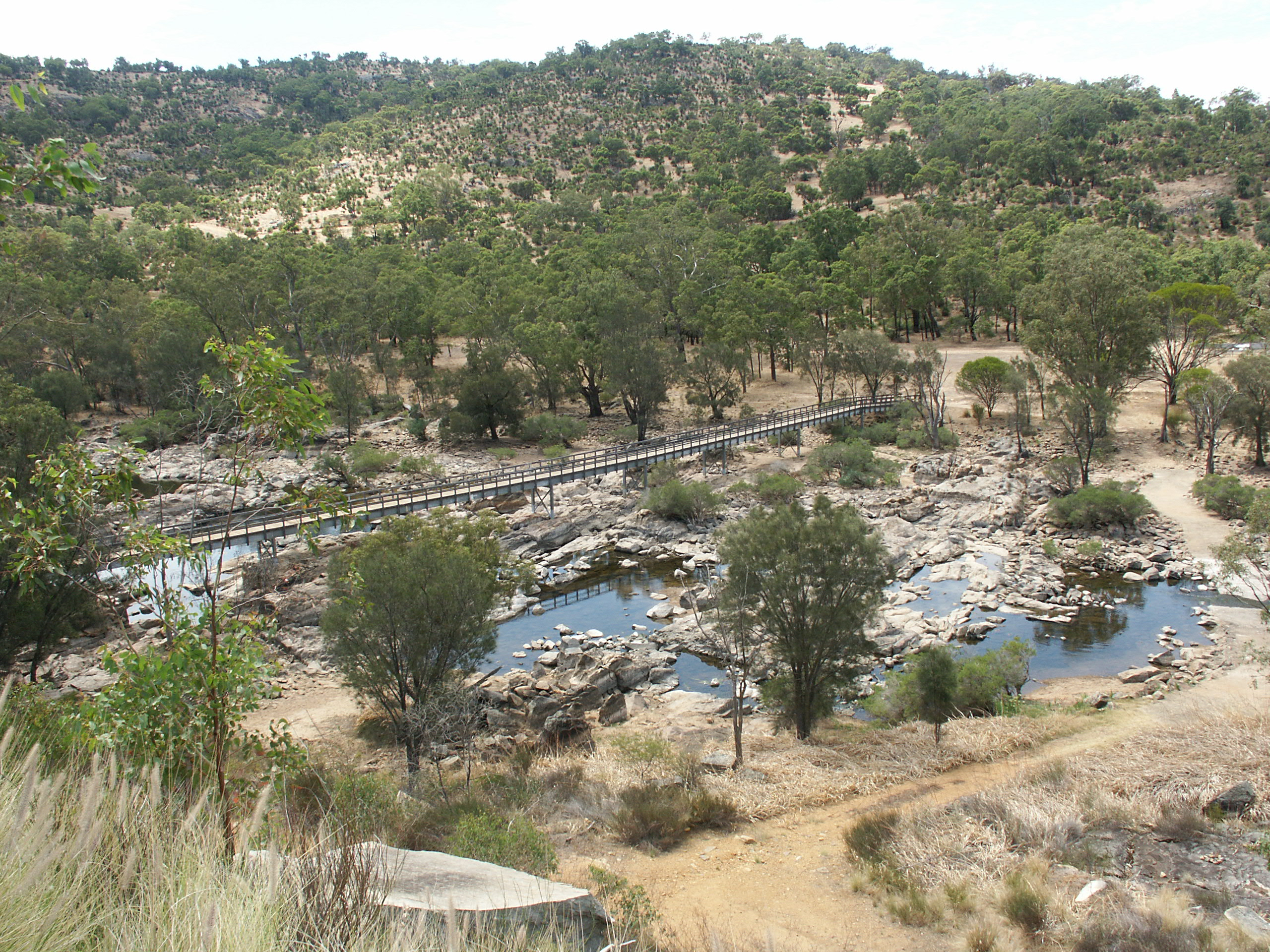
- Bells Rapids at Brigadoon
- Interactive map of Brigadoon
- Coordinates: 31.774°S 116.068°E
- Country: Australia
- State: Western Australia
- City: Perth, Western Australia
- LGA: City of Swan

Government
  - State electorate: Swan Hills
  - Federal division: Hasluck

Population
  - Total: 1,025 (SAL 2021)
- Postcode: 6069
Suburbs around Brigadoon
	Upper Swan
	Brigadoon
Herne Hill	Red Hill

Brigadoon is a semi-rural suburb of Perth, Western Australia. Considered an area rich in indigenous heritage and natural beauty with elevated views from the top of the Darling Scarp It is in the City of Swan local government area.

It sits on the edge of the Darling Scarp adjacent to the entrance to the Avon Valley, through which the Avon River flows. The Bells Rapids is a popular viewing location for the annual Avon Descent whitewater race.

Brigadoon is bordered by the Avon River / Swan River and Jumbuck Hill Park to the north-west and Walyunga National Park in the north. The area of Brigadoon was originally owned by the wife of Alan Bond, but is now home to the State Equestrian Centre in the south-west, and features a growing number of large plot housing estates along its eastern border with the rural town district of Gidgegannup.

== Landmarks ==
A popular landmark of Brigadoon was the Lady of the Lake statue on Campersic Road, used for decades by local residents to gauge rainfall levels. As of December 2025, the statue was in storage following repairs, with plans to reinstall it in early 2026.
