= Brockman River =

River in Western Australia

Brockman
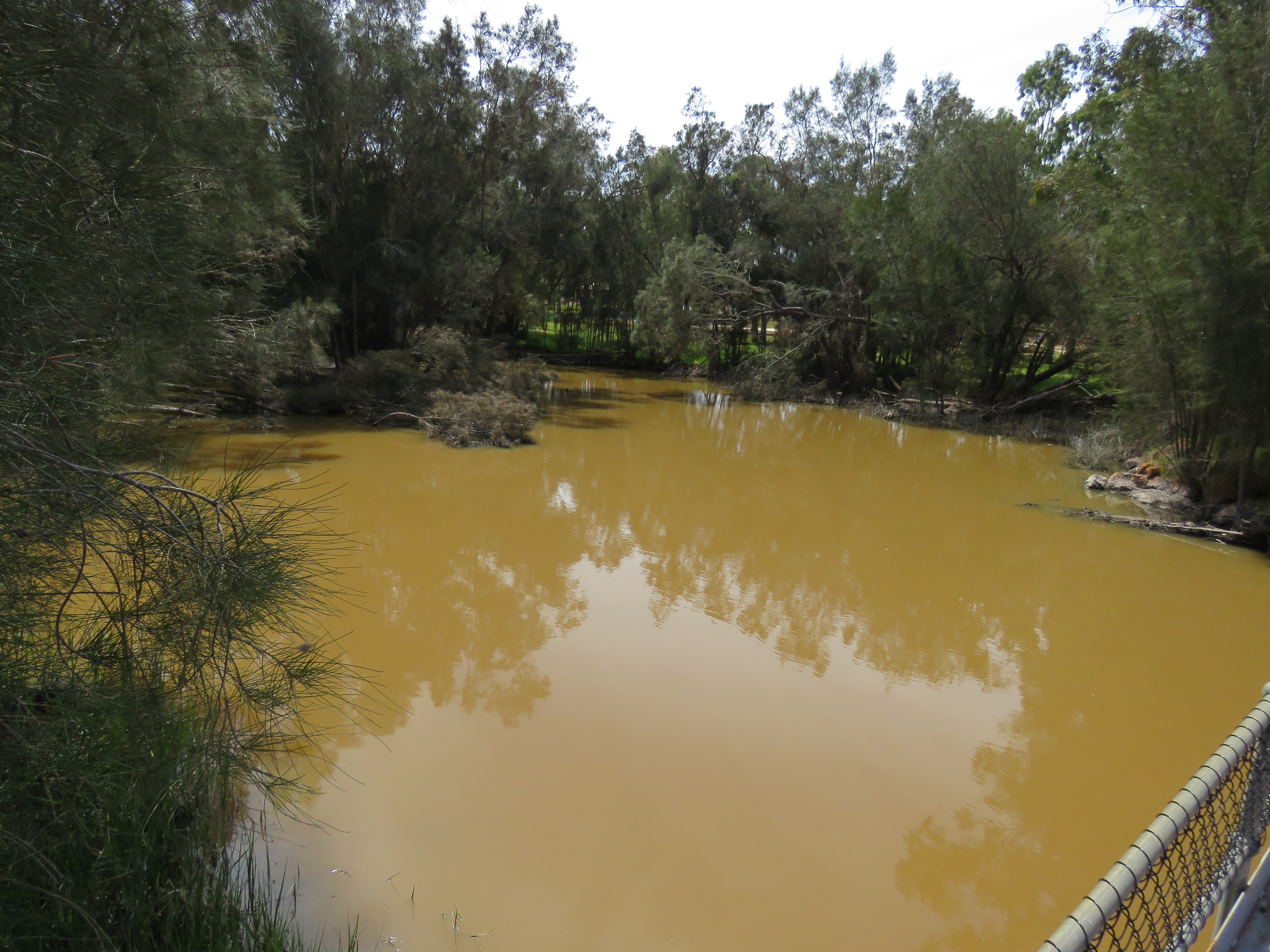
- Etymology: William Locke Brockman, a pastoralist

Location
- Country: Australia
- State: Western Australia
- Region: Wheatbelt

Physical characteristics
- Source: Darling Scarp
  - location: north of Bindoon Hill
  - coordinates: 31°14′13″S 116°4′8″E
  - elevation: 159 m (522 ft)
- Mouth: Avon River
  - location: east of Bullsbrook
  - coordinates: 31°41′1″S 116°7′6″E
  - elevation: 55 m (180 ft)
- Length: 73 km (45 mi)
- Basin size: 1,520 km^{2} (590 sq mi)

Basin features
- River system: Avon River

The Brockman River is a perennial river located in the Wheatbelt region of Western Australia.

== Course and features ==
The river rises north of Bindoon Hill and then flows generally in a southerly direction. The river is crossed by the Great Northern Highway near the Bindoon-Moora Road turnoff and flows parallel with the highway as it continues southward. Passing the town of Bindoon and through Lake Needoonga and Lake Chittering, the highway crosses the river as the river veers eastward. The river then passes Lower Chittering and finally discharges into the Avon River near Jumperkine Hill just north of Walyunga National Park. The river has many smaller tributaries including Wootra Brook, Spice Brook, Longbridge Gully, Marbling Brook, and Marda Brook. The river descends 103 metres (338 ft) over its 73-kilometre (45 mi) course.

The Brockman has the largest catchment in the Lower Avon and Upper Swan River catchments. The natural resource base of the river is deteriorating as a result of clearing of natural vegetation which in turn has led to erosion and salinity.

The first European to pass by the river was the surveyor Francis Thomas Gregory who named the river in 1853. The river is named after William Locke Brockman who was a pastoralist in the region with large land holdings and a Member of the Western Australian Legislative Council.

== See also ==
- List of watercourses in Western Australia
