= Black Swan (disambiguation) =

Black swan is the common name for Cygnus atratus, an Australasian waterfowl.

(The) Black Swan(s) may also refer to:

== Film and television ==
- The Black Swan (film), a 1942 swashbuckler film
- Black Swans (film), a 2005 Dutch drama film
- Black Swan (film), a 2010 psychological horror film starring Natalie Portman
- "Black Swan", an episode of FlashForward
- "The Black Swan", an episode of Curb Your Enthusiasm

== Literature ==
=== Novels and short stories ===
- The Black Swan (Sabatini novel), a 1932 pirate adventure novel by Rafael Sabatini
- The Black Swan (Mann novel), a 1954 short book by Thomas Mann
- The Black Swan, a 1975 novel by Rachel Cosgrove Payes
- Black Swan, a 1987 novella by Christopher Hope
- The Black Swan, a 1990 novel by Philippa Carr, the 16th book of her fiction series Daughters of England
- Black Swans: Stories, a 1993 book by Eve Babitz
- "The Black Swan", a 1994 work of short fiction by Grace Andreacchi
- "Black Swans", a 1997 essay by Lauren Slater
- The Black Swan (Lackey novel), a 1999 fantasy novel by Mercedes Lackey
- The Black Swan: A Memoir of the Bronx, a 2000 memoir by Jerome Charyn
- The Black Swan: The Impact of the Highly Improbable, a 2007 book about uncertainty by Nassim Nicholas Taleb

=== Other uses ===
- Black Swan (comics), a German Marvel Comics mercenary and enemy to Deadpool and Agent X
- Black Swan (imprint), an imprint of Transworld Publishers, UK
- "Black Swans (poem)", 1893 poem by A. B. "Banjo" Paterson

== Music ==
=== Artists ===
- Elizabeth Greenfield (1809–1876), or The Black Swan, an American singer
- The Black Swans, an American indie rock band
- Blackswan, a South Korean girl group

=== Albums ===
- Black Swan (album), an album by Athlete
- blkswn, an album by Smino, or its title track
- The Black Swan (Bert Jansch album)
- The Black Swan (Story of the Year album), or its title track
- The Black Swan (The Triffids album)

=== Songs ===
- "Black Swan", a 2020 song by BTS from Map of the Soul: 7
- "Black Swan", a song by Tori Amos from several singles including Past the Mission
- "Black Swan", a 2006 song by Belladonna from Metaphysical Attraction
- "Black Swan", a 2005 song by Greg Dulli from Amber Headlights
- "Black Swan", a 2007 song by Megadeth from some versions of United Abominations
- "Black Swan", an aria in Gian Carlo Menotti's opera The Medium
- "Black Swan", a 2006 song by Thom Yorke from The Eraser
- "Black Swan", a 2020 song by TWRP, from the album Over the Top

=== Labels ===
- Black Swan Records, a 1920s US record label
- Black Swan Records (UK), a 1960s UK record label

== Pubs and hotels ==
- The Black Swan, Helmsley, a hotel in North Yorkshire, England
- The Black Swan, Kirkbymoorside, a pub in North Yorkshire
- The Black Swan, Middleham, a pub in North Yorkshire
- The Black Swan, Oldstead, an inn in North Yorkshire
- Black Swan, Ripon, a pub in North Yorkshire
- The Black Swan, York, a pub in York, England
- Black Swan Hotel, Devizes, an inn in Wiltshire, England
- Black Swan Inn, a pub in Pickering, North Yorkshire

== Ships ==
- HMS Black Swan (L57), a sloop of the Royal Navy launched in 1939
  - Black Swan-class sloop
- Black Swan-class sloop-of-war, a proposed British Royal Navy warship class

== Stage ==
- Black Swan State Theatre Company, a theatre company of Western Australia
- Black Swan Theatre, a performance venue for the Oregon Shakespeare Festival
- The Black Swan or Odile, a character in Swan Lake by Pyotr Ilyich Tchaikovsky
- Black Swan (musical), a 2026 musical

== Other uses ==
- Black Swan (dredge), a bucket dredge used in Perth, Western Australia, 1872–1911
- Black Swan (St. Paul's Churchyard), a historical bookseller in London
- Black Swans (special forces), a special forces unit in the Army of the Republic of Bosnia and Herzegovina
- Black Swan Data, a London-based technology and data science company
- Black Swan Prize for Portraiture, now The Lester Prize, an Australian art prize
- Black Swan Project, the code name of a shipwreck recovery project
- The Black Swan, a character in the 2000 PC game Crimson Skies
- Black Swan Nickel Mine, a mine in Western Australia
- Black Swan, a character in the 2023 gacha game Honkai: Star Rail
- Black swan, a person within the Vampire subculture who permits others to consume his or her blood.

== See also ==
- Black swan emblems and popular culture
- Black swan problem, the problem of induction in philosophy
- Black swan theory, a term developed by Nassim Taleb to label unexpected, rare events
- Faulty generalization, including the black swan fallacy
- Inverted Swan, a stamp featuring a printing error
