= Mistake Creek =

Mistake Creek may refer to the following places in Australia:

- Mistake Creek, Queensland, a community named after a tributary of the Belyando River
- Mistake Creek, a tributary of the Edward River, Queensland
- Mistake Creek, one of several watercourses in Western Australia

== See also ==
- Mistake Creek massacre, a massacre of Indigenous Australians at Mistake Creek, East Kimberley, Western Australia in 1915
- Mistake Creek massacre (Queensland), (aka Skull Hole massacre, Bladenburg massacre), a massacre of Indigenous Australians at Bladenburg Station, Queensland, c.1872
