= Acacia trinalis =

Conservation status
- Priority One — Poorly Known Taxa (DEC)

Scientific classification
- Kingdom: Plantae
- Clade: Tracheophytes
- Clade: Angiosperms
- Clade: Eudicots
- Clade: Rosids
- Order: Fabales
- Family: Fabaceae
- Subfamily: Caesalpinioideae
- Clade: Mimosoid clade
- Genus: Acacia
- Species: A. trinalis

Binomial name
- Acacia trinalis R.S.Cowan & Maslin
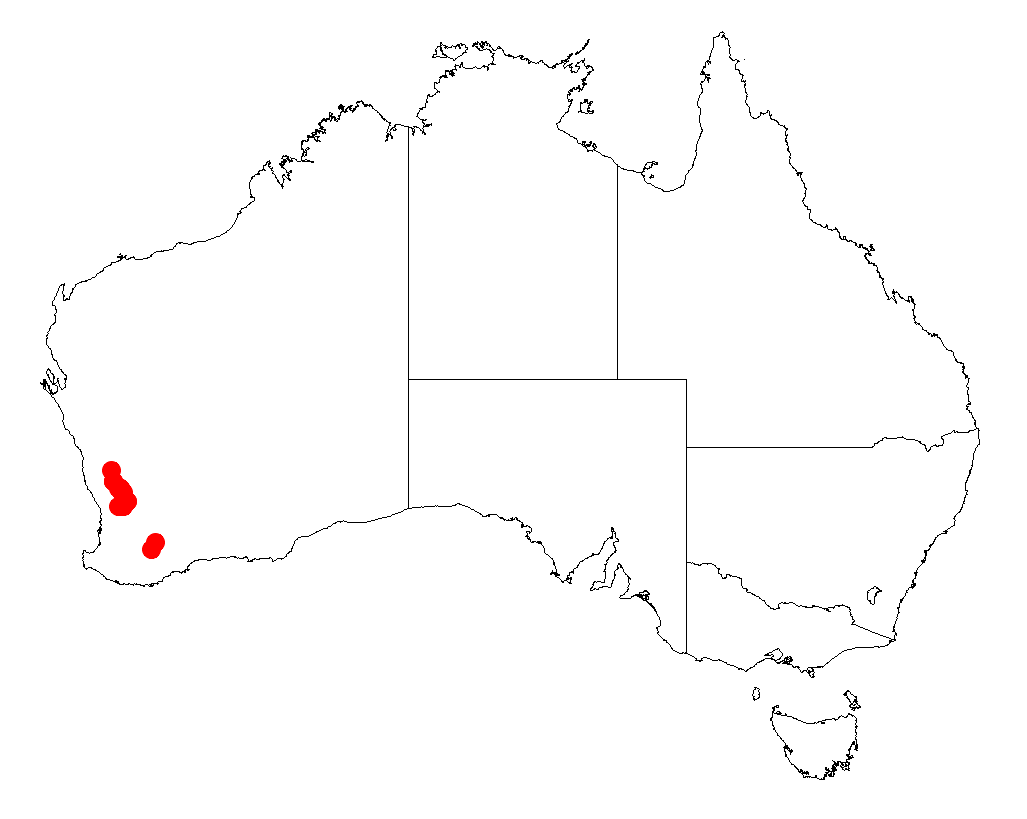
- Occurrence data from AVH

Species of legume

Acacia trinalis is a shrub or tree of the genus Acacia and the subgenus Plurinerves that is endemic to an area of south western Australia.

== Description ==
The dense, rounded and bushy shrub or tree typically grows to a height of 1.5 to 4 metres (5 to 13 ft) with multiple stems and glabrous and resinous new growth. The angular and resin-ribbed branchlets have easily detached minute stipules with a triangular shape. Like most species of Acacia it has phyllodes rather than true leaves. The evergreen, glabrous, thinly leathery and patent to ascending phyllodes have a linear shape and are straight to shallowly incurved with a length of 4.5 to 9 cm (1.8 to 3.5 in) and a width of 2 to 3 mm (0.079 to 0.118 in) and have three raised, resinous nerves with central nerve being the most prominent. It blooms in September and produces yellow flowers. The simple inflorescences occur in pairs in the axils and have spherical flower-heads with a diameter of 4 to 5 mm (0.16 to 0.20 in) containing 22 to 28 golden coloured flowers.

== Distribution ==
It is native to an area in the Wheatbelt region of Western Australia where it is commonly situated in swampy areas, around salt lakes and on flats growing in sandy or clay-loam soils. The range of the species extends from around Marchagee in the north west down to the Mortlock River near Goomalling in the south east.

== See also ==
- List of Acacia species
