= Mangrove Creek =

Mangrove Creek may refer to:

- Mangrove Creek, New South Wales, a settlement in New South Wales, Australia
- Mangrove Creek (New South Wales), a tributary of the Hawkesbury River in New South Wales, Australia
- Mangrove Creek (Western Australia), a watercourse in Western Australia
