= Swan River (Western Australia) =

River in Perth, Western Australia

Swan River Derbarl Yerrigan (Nyungar)
- The Swan River passing through Perth

- Location within Western Australia
- Swan (●, downstream) and Avon (●, upstream) rivers, collectively known sometimes as the Swan-Avon River

Location
- Country: Australia
- State: Western Australia
- City: Perth; Fremantle

Physical characteristics
- Source confluence: Avon River with Wooroloo Brook
  - location: below Mount Mambup
  - coordinates: 31°44′34″S 116°4′3″E
  - elevation: 53 m (174 ft)
- Mouth: Indian Ocean
  - location: Fremantle
  - coordinates: 32°4′25″S 115°42′52″E
  - elevation: 0 m (0 ft)
- Length: 72 km (45 mi)
- Basin size: 121,000 km^{2} (47,000 sq mi)

Basin features
- Tributaries
  - left: Susannah Brook, Jane Brook
  - right: Ellen Brook, Helena River, Bennett Brook, Canning River

The Swan River (Nyungar: Derbarl Yerrigan) is a major river in the southwest of Western Australia. The river runs through the centre of Perth, Western Australia's capital and largest city.

By convention the Swan River is deemed to run for 72 kilometres (45 mi) from Walyunga National Park down to the river mouth at Fremantle Harbour. Upstream of Walyunga, in the Wheatbelt, the river is known as the Avon. The watercourse as a whole is sometimes known as the Swan-Avon River. The Helena River is the Swan's largest tributary, with other tributaries including various brooks and drains. The Canning River is technically not a tributary of Swan, but rather a separate river which forms an estuary with the Swan at Melville Water, known as the Swan-Canning Estuary.

The Swan River was named by Dutch explorer Willem de Vlamingh in 1697 after the black swans endemic to the region. Following British colonisation the Swan River Colony was established in 1829 with three settlements located on the river: the capital Perth, the port of Fremantle, and the inland town of Guildford. European settlement brought significant changes to the river, including clearing or draining of adjacent wetlands, land reclamation and embankment (including the creation of Heirisson Island), and the removal of the original sandbar at the river mouth. Most areas adjacent to the river are now primarily residential, although the Swan Valley north of Guildford remains a significant agricultural area and wine region.

The Perth central business district is located on Perth Water, a shallower portion of the river, and includes a ferry terminal at Elizabeth Quay, with public Transperth ferry services running to South Perth and private services operating to Fremantle and Rottnest Island. The river and foreshore form part of the Swan Canning Riverpark which is managed by the Western Australian state government's Department of Biodiversity, Conservation and Attractions, replacing the earlier Swan River Trust in 2015.

== Naming and terminology ==
The Swan River and the Avon River are the same watercourse. By convention, the name Avon is used from the source of the river to its confluence with the Wooroloo Brook in Walyunga National Park, where it assumes the name Swan. The naming convention has been described as a "historical anomaly". For that reason, the main branch of the river system is sometimes referred to as the Swan–Avon River.

Approximately 60 kilometres (37 mi) of the Swan River is estuarine in nature with brackish water, with the effects of ocean tides extending inland as far as the confluence with Ellen Brook. The true river portion of the Swan historically culminated in a mudflat delta at what is now Heirisson Island. Technical sources regard the Swan–Avon and Canning as separate rivers flowing into a single body of water, the Swan–Canning Estuary, at Melville Water, rather than treating the Canning as a tributary of the Swan. This distinction was noted as early as 1827 by James Stirling.

== Geology ==
Before the Tertiary, when the sea level was much lower than at present, the Swan River curved around to the north of Rottnest Island, and disgorged itself into the Indian Ocean slightly to the north and west of Rottnest. In doing so, it carved a gorge about the size of the Grand Canyon. Now known as Perth Canyon, this feature still exists as a submarine canyon near the edge of the continental shelf.

== Geography ==
The Bell Rapids, near Upper Swan

The Swan River drains the Swan Coastal Plain, a total catchment area of over 100,000 square kilometres (39,000 sq mi) in area. The river is located in a Mediterranean climate, with hot dry summers and cool wet winters, although this balance appears to be changing due to climate change. The Swan is located on the edge of the Darling Scarp, flowing downhill across the coastal plain to its mouth at Fremantle.

=== Sources ===
The Swan begins as the Avon River, rising near Yealering in the Darling Range, approximately 175 kilometres (109 mi) from its mouth at Fremantle. The Avon flows north, passing through the towns of Brookton, Beverley, York, Northam and Toodyay. It is joined by tributaries including the Dale River, the Mortlock River and the Brockman River. The Avon becomes the Swan as Wooroloo Brook enters the river near Walyunga National Park.

=== Tributaries ===
More tributaries including Ellen Brook, Jane Brook, Henley Brook, Wandoo Creek, Bennett Brook, Blackadder Creek, Limestone Creek, Susannah Brook, and the Helena River enter the river between Wooroloo Brook and Guildford; however, most of these have either dried up or become seasonally flowing due to human impacts such as land clearing and development.

=== Swan coastal plain ===
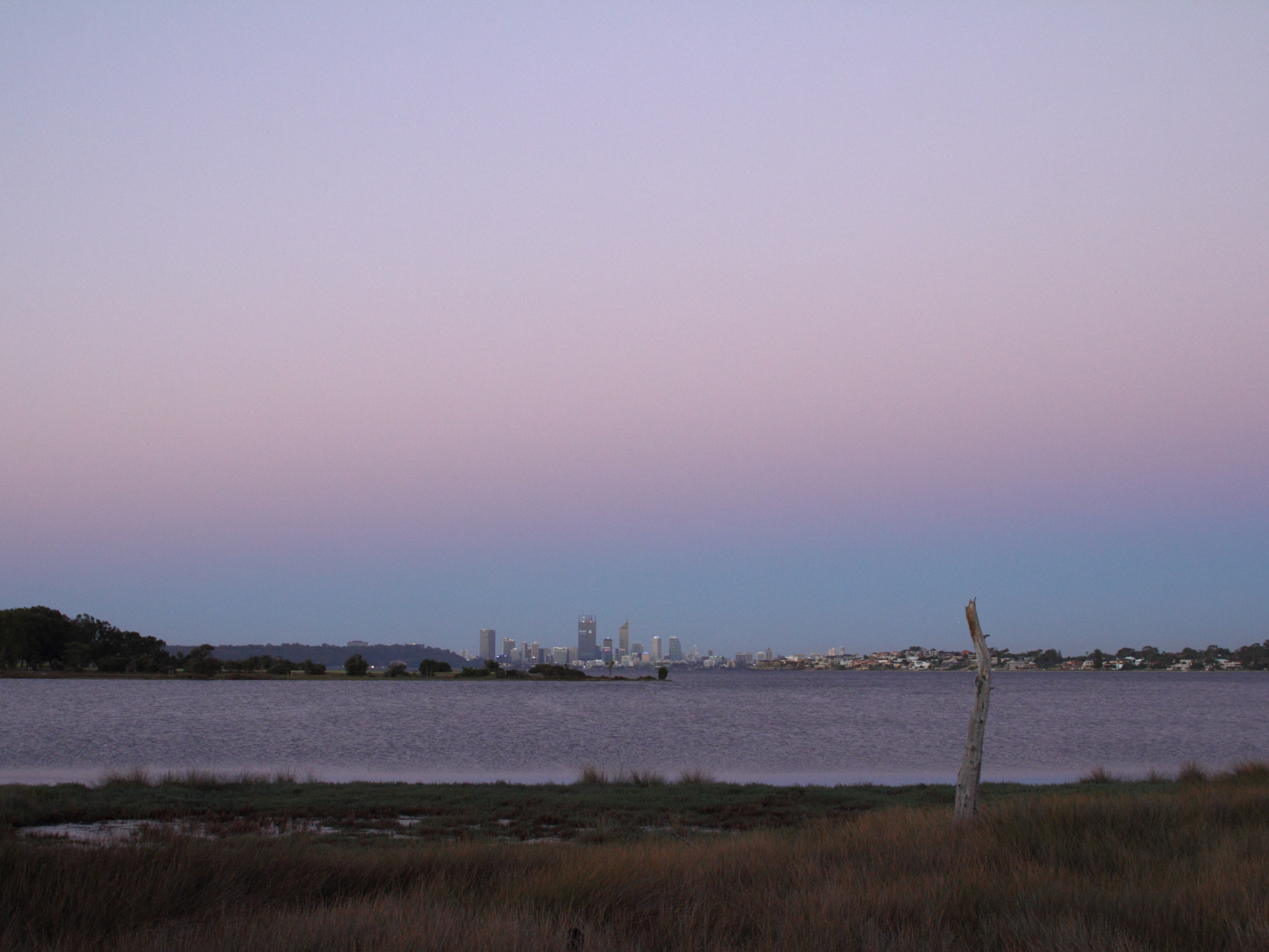
Swampy wetlands between Perth and Guildford have been reclaimed for land development; however, this one still remains. The Perth skyline can be seen in the far distance.

Between Perth and Guildford the river goes through several loops. Originally, areas including the Maylands Peninsula, Ascot and Burswood, through Claise Brook and north of the city to Herdsman Lake were swampy wetlands. Most of the wetlands have since been reclaimed for land development. Heirisson Island, upon which The Causeway passes over, was once a collection of small islets known as the Heirisson Islands.

=== Perth Water and Melville Water ===
Perth Water, between the city and South Perth, is separated from the main estuary by the Narrows, over which the Narrows Bridge was built in 1959. The river then opens up into the large expanse of the river known as Melville Water. The Canning River enters the river at Canning Bridge in Applecross from its source 50 kilometres (31 mi) south-east of Armadale. The river is at its widest here, measuring more than 4 kilometres (2.5 mi) from north to south. Point Walter has a protruding spit that extends up to 800 metres (2,600 ft) into the river, forcing river traffic to detour around it.

=== Narrowing and Fremantle ===
Sunset over the river mouth in Fremantle, with a bottlenose dolphin swimming across the middle of the screen

The river narrows between Chidley Point and Blackwall Reach, curving around Point Roe and Preston Point before narrowing into the harbour. Stirling Bridge and Walyalup Bridge cross the river north of the rivermouth. The Swan River empties into the Indian Ocean at Fremantle Harbour.

== Notable features ==
- Fremantle Harbour
- Point Brown
- Rous Head
- Arthur Head
- Victoria Quay
- Point Direction
- Preston Point
- Rocky Bay
- Point Roe
- Chidley Point
- Blackwall Reach
- Butler's Hump
- Point Walter
- Mosman Bay
- Keanes Point
- Freshwater Bay
- Point Resolution
- Melville Water
- Lucky Bay
- Point Waylen
- Alfred Cove
- Point Dundas
- Waylen Bay
- Point Heathcote
- Quarry Point
- Mounts Bay
- Point Lewis
- Mill Point
- Point Belches
- Elizabeth Quay
- Pelican Point
- Matilda Bay
- The Narrows
- Perth Water
- Point Fraser
- Heirisson Island
- Claise Brook
- Maylands Peninsula
- Ron Courtney Island
- Swan Valley
- Kuljak Island
Panorama of Rocky Bay looking south

== Flora and fauna ==
Plant and animal life found in or near the Swan-Canning Estuary include:

- Over 130 species of fish including bull sharks (Note: Sharks are present in the river, but rarely attack swimmers. As of February 2023 there have been seven recorded attacks, with two fatalities since 1923.) (Carcharhinus leucas), rays, cobblers (Cnidoglanis macrocephalus, also known as Swan River catfish), herring (Elops machnata), pilchard (Sardinops neopilchardus), bream (Kyphosus sydneyanus), flatheads, leatherjackets and blowfish (Tetraodontidae)
- Jellyfish including Phyllorhiza punctata and Aurelia aurita
- Bottlenose dolphins
- Crustaceans including prawns and blue manna crabs
- Amphipod Melita zeylanica kauerti described based on specimen that was collected from under Middle Swan Bridge
- Molluscs including Mytilidae, Galeommatidae
- Birds including the eponymous black swan, silver gull, cormorants (locally referred to as "shags"), twenty-eight parrots, rainbow lorikeet, kingfisher, red-tailed black cockatoo, Australian pelican, Australian magpie, heron and ducks

== History ==
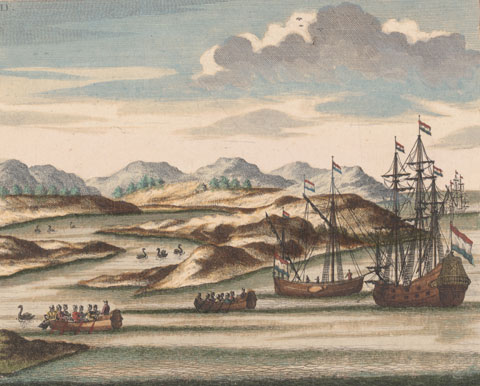
Willem de Vlamingh's ships, with black swans, at the entrance to the Swan River, Western Australia, coloured engraving (1726), derived from an earlier drawing (now lost) from the de Vlamingh expeditions of 1696–97

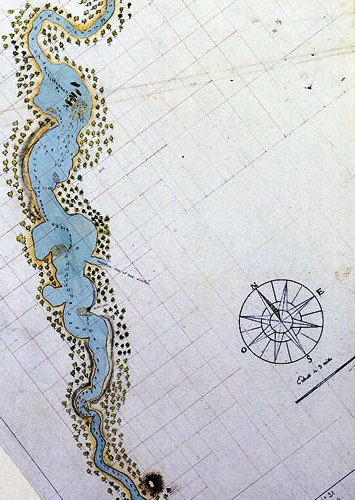
The first detailed map of the Swan River, drawn by François-Antoine Boniface Heirisson in 1801

The river was named Swarte Swaene-Revier by the Dutch explorer Willem de Vlamingh in 1697, after the famous black swans of the area. Vlamingh sailed with a small party up the river to around Heirisson Island. (Note: See also the 1780 usage of the name Black Swan River in Dalrymple (1780).) A French expedition under Nicholas Baudin also sailed up the river in 1801.

Governor James Stirling intended that the name Swan River refer only to the watercourse upstream of the Heirisson Islands. All of the rest, including Perth Water, he considered estuarine and which he referred to as Melville Water. The Government notice dated 27 July 1829 stated "the first stone will be laid of a new town to be called 'Perth', near the entrance to the estuary of the Swan River."

Almost immediately after the Town of Perth was established, a systematic effort was underway to reshape the river. This was done for many reasons:

- to alleviate flooding in winter periods;
- improve access for boats by having deeper channels and jetties;
- removal of marshy land which created a mosquito menace;
- enlargement of dry land for agriculture and building.

Perth streets were often sandy bogs which caused Governor Stirling in 1837 to report to the Secretary of State for Colonies:

At the present time it can scarcely be said that any roads exist, although certain lines of communication have been improved by clearing them of timber and by bridging streams and by establishing ferries in the broader parts of the Swan River [...].

Parts of the river required dredging with the material dumped onto the mud flats to raise the adjoining land. An exceptionally wet winter in 1862 saw major flooding throughout the area – the effect of which was exacerbated by the extent of the reclaimed lands. The first bucket dredge in Western Australia was the Black Swan, used between 1872 and 1911 for dredging channels in the river, as well as reclamation.

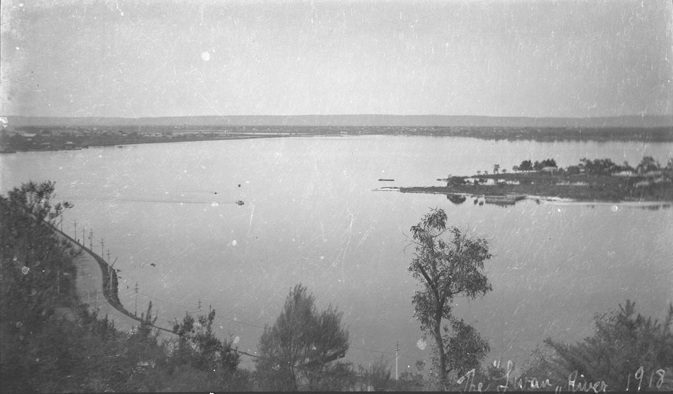
Swan River in 1918, showing the then as-yet largely undeveloped Mill Point area

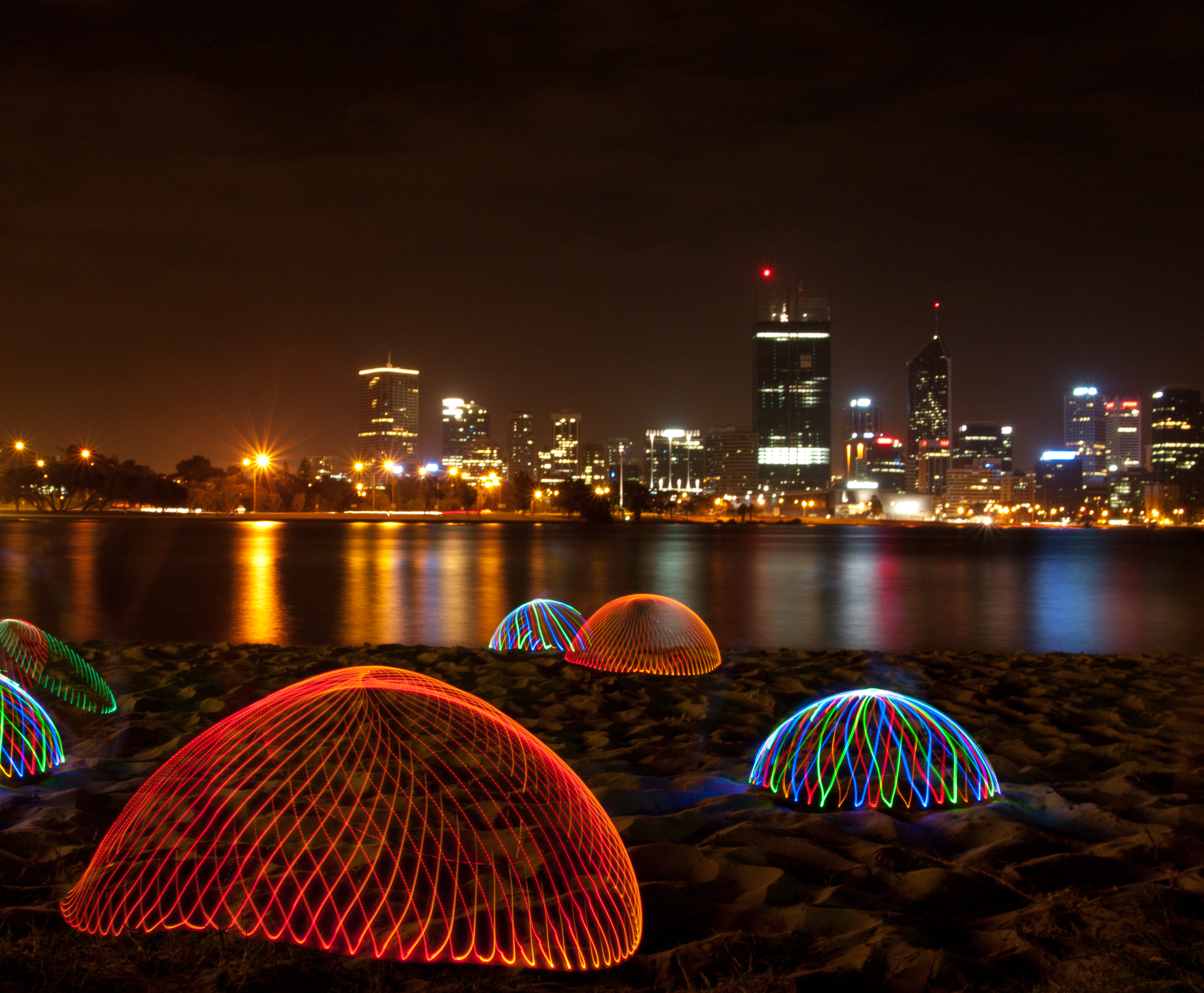
Light painting on the banks of the Swan River in January 2012

=== Notable features ===
A number of features of the river, particularly around the city, have reshaped its profile since European settlement in 1829:

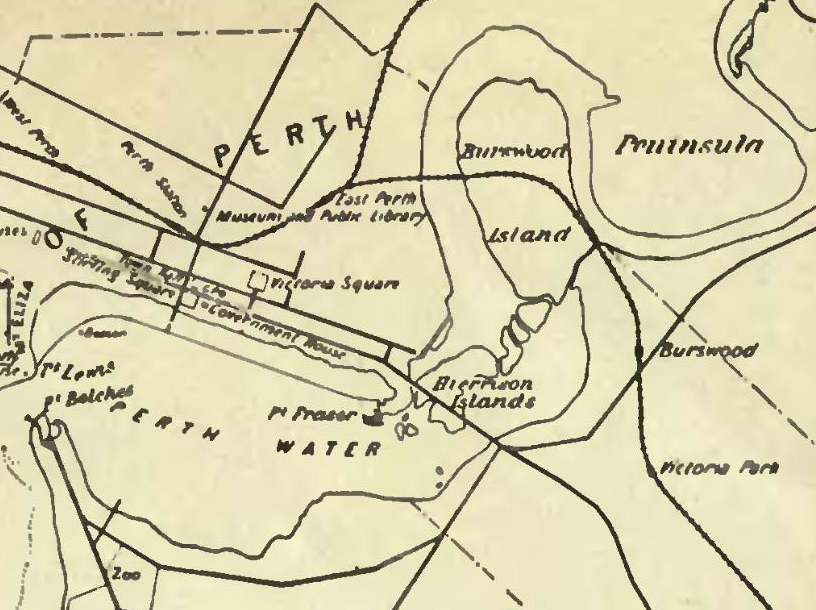
1909 map showing Heirisson Islands and alignment of the Burswood Island canal

- Claise Brook – named Clause's Brook (after Frederick Clause) on early maps. This was a fresh water creek which emptied the network of natural lakes north of the city. Before an effective sewerage system was built, it became an open sewer which dumped waste directly into the river for many years during the 1800s and early 1900s. The area surrounding has been mainly industrial for most of the period of European settlement and it has a long history of neglect. Since the late 1980s, the East Perth redevelopment has dramatically tidied up the area and works include a landscaped inlet off the river large enough for boats. The area is now largely residential and the brook exists in name only with the lakes having been either removed or managed by artificial drainage systems.
- Point Fraser – early maps showed this as a major promontory on the northern side of the river west of the Causeway. It disappeared between 1921 and 1935 when land fill was added on both sides, straightening the irregular foreshore and forming the rectangular 'The Esplanade'.
- The Esplanade – the northern riverbank originally ran close to the base of the escarpment generally a single block width south of St Georges Terrace. Houses built on the southern side of St Georges Terrace included market gardens which ran to the waters edge.
- Heirisson Islands – a series of mudflats that were slightly more upstream from today's single artificial island which has deep channels on each side.
- Burswood – early in the settlement the Perth flats restricted the passage of all but flat bottom boats travelling between Perth and Guildford. It was decided that a canal be built to bypass these creating Burswood Island. In 1831 it took seven men 107 days to do the work. Once completed, it measured about 280 metres (920 ft) in length by an average top width of nearly 9 metres (30 ft) which tapered to 4 metres (13 ft) at the bottom; the depth varied between nearly 1 and 6 metres (3 ft 3 in and 19 ft 8 in). Further improvements were made in 1834. The area on the south side of the river upstream from the causeway was filled throughout the 1900s, reclaiming an area five times the area of the Mitchell Interchange and Narrows Bridge works.
- Point Belches – later known as Mill Point, South Perth. Originally existed as a sandy promontory surrounding a deep semi-circular bay. This was later named Millers Pool and was eventually filled in and widened to become the present-day South Perth peninsula to which the Narrows Bridge and Kwinana Freeway adjoin.
- Point Lewis (also known as One-tree Point after a solitary tree that stood on the site for many years) – the northern side of the Narrows Bridge site, and now beneath the interchange.
- Mounts Bay – a modest reclamation was done between 1921 and 1935. In the 1950s works involving the Narrows Bridge started and in 1957 the bay was dramatically reduced in size with works related to the Mitchell Interchange and the northern approaches to the Narrows. An elderly Bessie Rischbieth famously protested against the project by standing in the shallows in front of the bulldozers for a whole day in 1957. She succeeded in halting progress – for that one day.
- Bazaar Terrace/Bazaar Street – in the early days of the settlement this waterfront road between William Street and Mill Street was an important commercial focus with port facilities including several jetties adjoining. It is now approximately where Mounts Bay Road is today and set well back from the foreshore. It had a prominent limestone wall and promenade built using material quarried from Mount Eliza.
- River mouth at Fremantle – the harbour was built in the 1890s and the limestone reef blocking the river was removed at the same time, after 70 years of demands. The dredging of the area to build the harbour effectively changed the river dynamics from a winter flushing flow to a tidal flushing estuary. It was also at this time that the Helena River was dammed as part of C. Y. O'Connor's ambitious and successful plan to provide water to the Kalgoorlie Goldfields.

=== Environmental issues ===
The river has been used for the disposal of all kinds of waste. Even well into the 1970s, various local councils had rubbish tips on the mud flats along the edge of the river. Heavy industry also contributed its share of waste into the river from wool scouring plants in Fremantle to fertiliser and foundries sited in the Bayswater – Bassendean area. Remedial sites works are still ongoing in these areas to remove the toxins left to leach into the river.

During the summer months there are problems with algal blooms killing fish, caused by nutrient run-off from farming activities as well as the use of fertilisers in the catchment areas. The occasional accidental spillage of sewage and chemicals has also caused sections of the river to be closed to human access. The river has survived all this and is in relatively good condition considering on-going threats to its ecology.

In February 2000, an "unusual and massive toxic blue-green algae bloom" resulted in the closure of the Swan River from Fremantle to Success Hill for twelve days. The source of the bloom was identified as Microcystis, which was regarded as a major public health risk. An investigation by the Swan River Trust attributed the bloom to two unseasonable rainfall events in January 2000, which saturated the Avon catchment and resulted in nutrient-rich fresh water being washed into the Swan-Canning estuary. The strain of Microcystis responsible for the bloom likely originated in stagnant pools in the upper reaches of the Avon.

In 2010 the Government of Western Australian imposed restrictions on phosphorus levels in fertilisers due to concerns about the health of the Swan and Canning river systems.

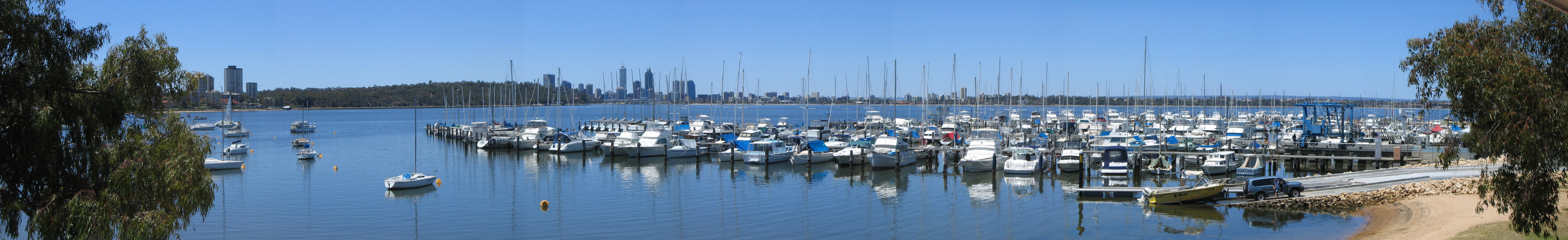
Matilda Bay on the Swan River, with Mount Eliza and the Perth skyline in the background

=== Flood events ===
Return period of flood events
Year	Return period (years)
1862	60
1872	100
1910	20
1917	20
1926	30
1930	15
1945	20
1946	10
1955	20
1958	20
1963	15
1964	10
1983	10

Data collection of flood events in the estuary has been performed since European arrival in 1829. In July 1830, barely a year after the establishment of the colony, the river rose 6 metres (20 ft) above its normal level. New settlers were still arriving in steady numbers and few permanent buildings had been constructed, with most living in tents and other temporary accommodation. These included caves along the river's edge and many found their belongings washed away and livestock drowned. Other abnormal flooding events occurred in the winters of 1847 and 1860, while the most recent flooding occurred in 2017. Later events have since been assessed for their return period.

The largest recorded flood event was in July 1872 which had a calculated return period of 100 years. At the Helena River, the 1872 flood level was 690 millimetres (2 ft 3 in) higher than the 1862 event with a return period of 60 years. An account in The Perth Gazette and Western Australian Journal on 26 July 1872 reported

In and about Perth, the water owing to the force of the incoming seas at the mouth of the river presented a scene of a great lake, all the jetties were submerged, the high roads to Fremantle covered, and passage traffic rendered impossible quantities of sandalwood lying along the banks of river were washed away, and the inhabitants of the suburban villas on the slopes of Mount Eliza obliged to scramble up the hill sides to get into Perth.

The flood of July 1926, with a return period of 30 years, resulted in the washing away of the Yagan Bridge and a section of the Fremantle Railway Bridge. The Fremantle bridge partially collapsed on 22 July 1926, five minutes after a train containing schoolchildren had passed over. No one was injured in the collapse; however, it created major disruption to commerce for several months. Repairs were completed and the bridge reopened on 12 October 1926.

1926 floods
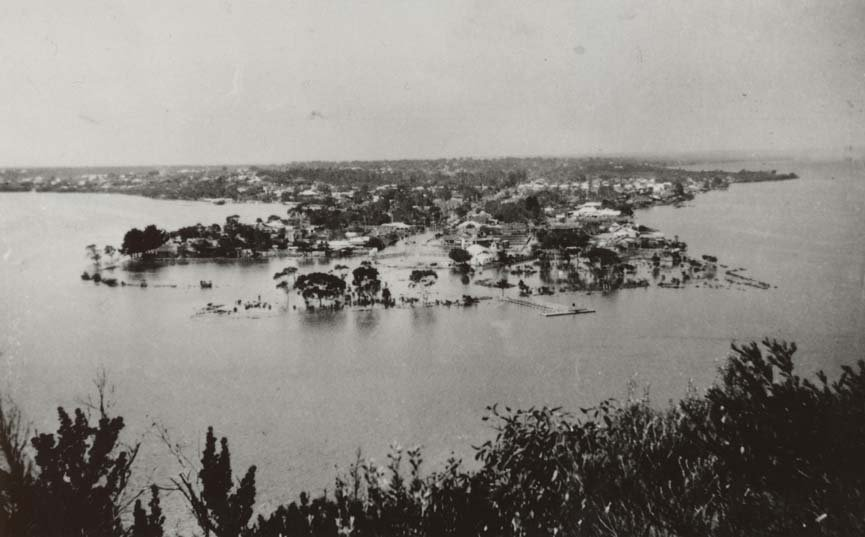
Mill Point, South Perth, during the 1926 floods

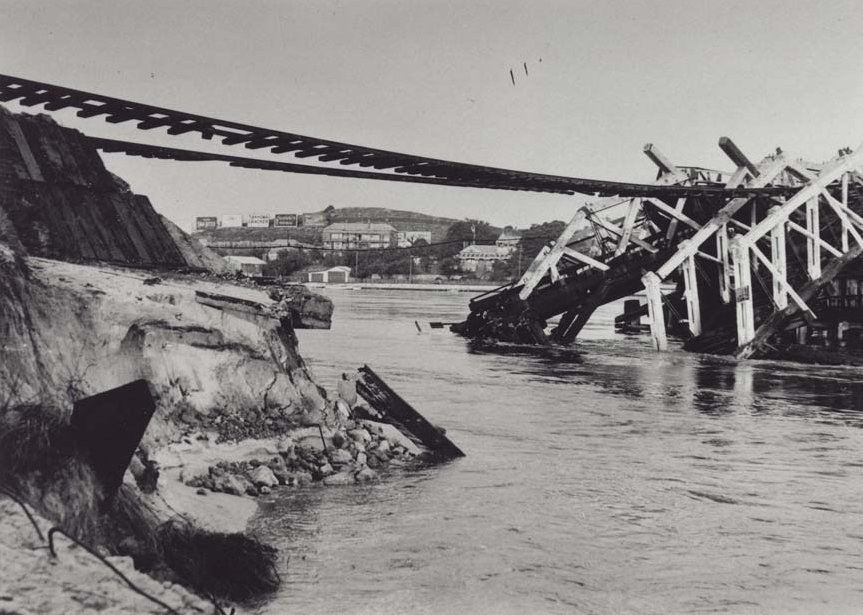
North Fremantle Railway Bridge collapse in 1926

== Governance ==
The Swan River Trust was a state government body, within the ambit of the Department of Environment and Conservation (Western Australia) – that was constituted in 1989 after legislation passed the previous year, that reports to the Minister for the Environment. It brings together eight representatives from the community, State and local government authorities with an interest in the Swan and Canning rivers to form a single body responsible for planning, protecting and managing Perth's river system.

The functions of the trust have been absorbed by the subsequent Western Australian Environmental protection authorities, the most recent change being in 2017, to the Department of Biodiversity, Conservation and Attractions.

== Human uses ==
=== Transport ===
In the earliest days of the Swan River Colony, the river was used as the main transport route between Perth and Fremantle. This continued until the establishment of the government rail system between Fremantle and Guildford via Perth.

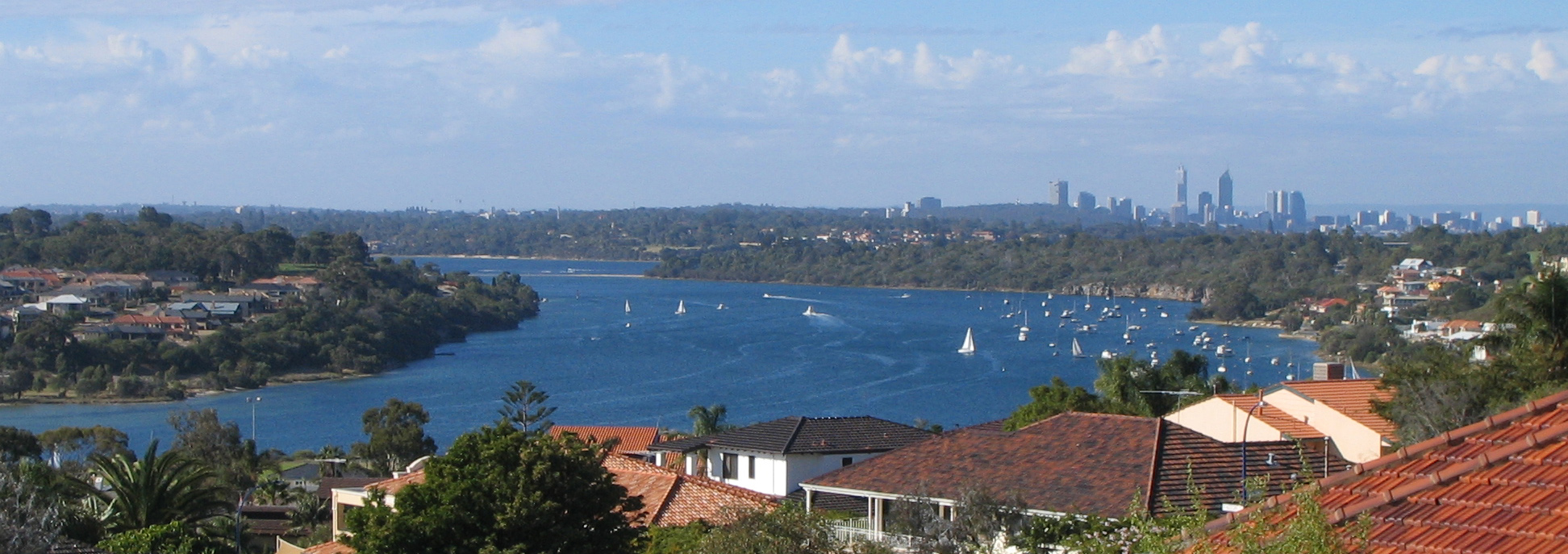
View from East Fremantle along Blackwall Reach towards Point Walter and Perth

=== Bridges ===
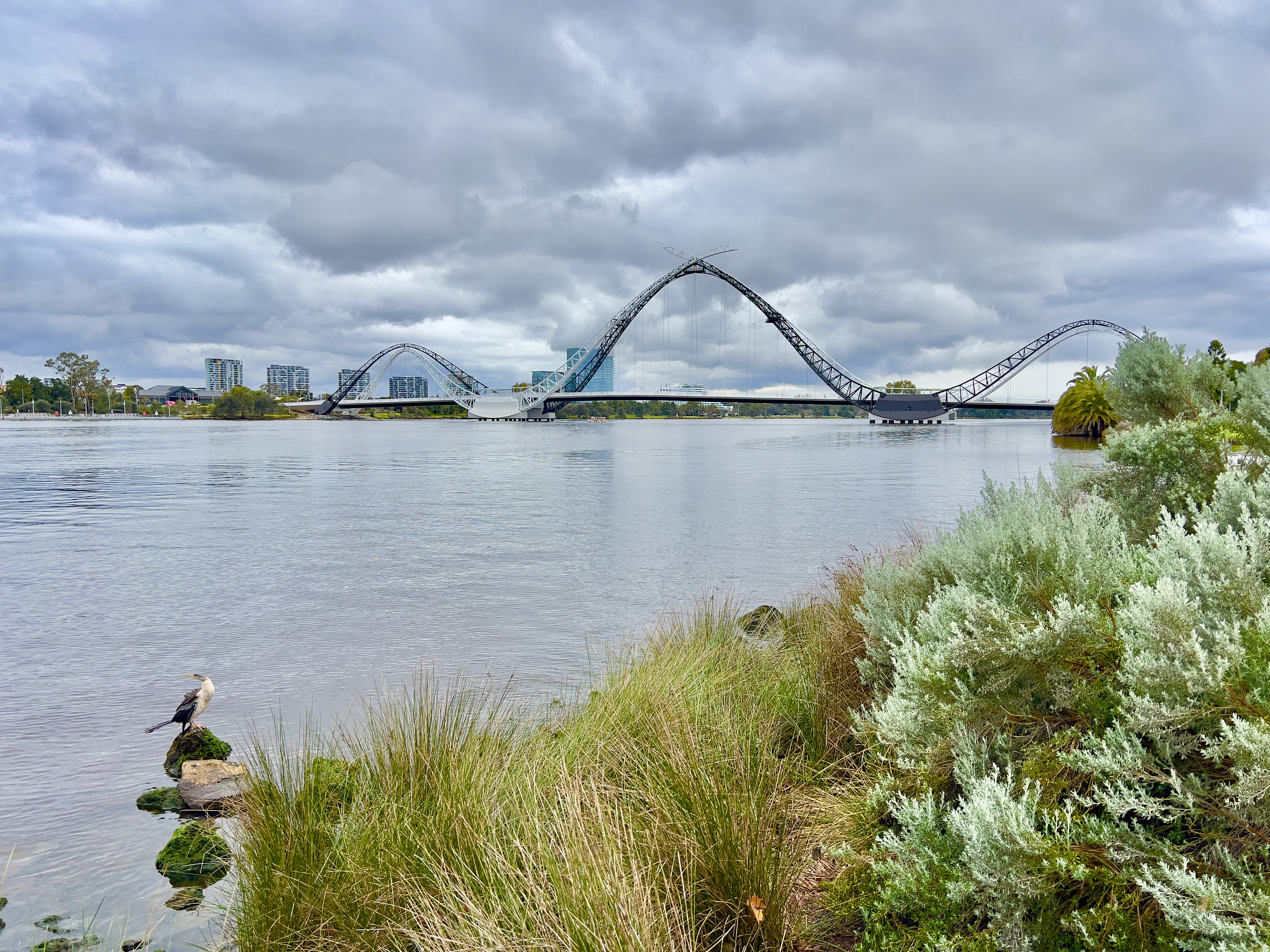
Matagarup Bridge

There are currently 22 road and railway bridges crossing the Swan River. These are (from Fremantle, heading upstream): (Note: Some of the bridges have had earlier forms that were demolished to make way for newer bridges.)

- Fremantle Railway Bridge, North Fremantle to Fremantle (Eastern railway line)
- Walyalup Bridge, North Fremantle to Fremantle
- Stirling Bridge (Stirling Highway), North Fremantle to East Fremantle
- Narrows Bridge, South Perth to Perth (Kwinana Freeway and Mandurah railway line; 2001) – northbound
- Narrows Bridge, Perth to South Perth (Mandurah railway line)
- Narrows Bridge, Perth to South Perth (Kwinana Freeway; 1959) – southbound
- Boorloo Bridge comprising two bridges: between East Perth and Heirisson Island (north-west), and between Heirisson Island and Victoria Park (south-east)
- The Causeway bridges between East Perth and Heirisson Island (north-west), and between Heirisson Island and Victoria Park (south-east)
- Matagarup Bridge, East Perth to Perth Stadium, Burswood (pedestrian bridge)
- Goongoongup Bridge, East Perth to Burswood (Armadale line)
- Windan Bridge, East Perth to Burswood, (Graham Farmer Freeway)
- Garratt Road Bridge, Bayswater to Ascot – northbound
- Garratt Road Bridge, Ascot to Bayswater (Garratt Road and Grandstand Road) – southbound
- Mooro-Beeloo Bridge, Bayswater to Ascot (Tonkin Highway)
- Guildford Road Bridge, Bassendean to Guildford (Guildford Road and Bridge Street)
- Guildford Railway Bridge, Bassendean to Guildford (Eastern railway line)
- Barkers Bridge, Guildford to Caversham (Meadow Street and West Swan Road)
- Whiteman Bridge, Caversham to Middle Swan (Reid Highway and Roe Highway)
- Maali Bridge, Henley Brook to Herne Hill (pedestrian bridge; formerly called Barrett Street Bridge)
- Yagan Bridge, Belhus to Upper Swan (Great Northern Highway; formerly called Upper Swan Bridge)
- Upper Swan railway bridge, Upper Swan (unnamed)
- Bells Rapids bridge, Upper Swan to Brigadoon (unnamed)
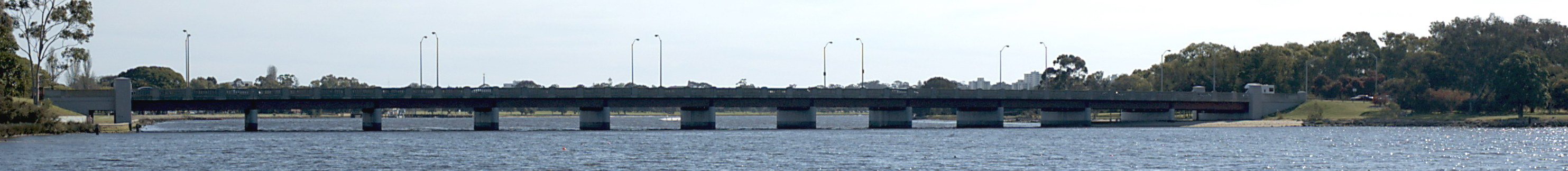
Eastern end of The Causeway taken from Burswood Park

=== Rowing clubs ===
The earliest club was the West Australian Rowing Club. The Swan River Rowing Club started in 1887. The Fremantle Rowing Club had started by the 1890s.

=== Yacht clubs ===
There are currently fifteen yacht clubs along the Swan River, with most on Melville Water, Freshwater Bay and Matilda Bay. Royal Perth Yacht Club, on Pelican Point in Matilda Bay, staged the unsuccessful 1987 America's Cup defence, the first time in 132 years it had been held outside of the United States. Royal Perth Yacht Club and the Royal Freshwater Bay Yacht Club are the only two clubs to be granted a royal charter. There are also many anchorages and marinas along the lower reaches near Fremantle.

== Cultural significance ==
The river is a significant part of Perth culture, with many water sports such as rowing, sailing, and swimming all occurring in its waters.

There have been some north of the river or south of the river distinctions in the Perth metropolitan region over time, especially in the time up to the completion of the Causeway and Narrows bridges, due to the time and distances to cross the river.

The river was the site of the City of Perth Skyworks, a fireworks show held each year on Australia Day from 1985 until 2022, with spectators crowding the foreshore, Kings Park, and on boats on the river to watch the event.

=== Aboriginal ===
The Noongar people believe that the Darling Scarp represents the body of a Wagyl (also spelt Waugal) – a snakelike being from Dreamtime that meandered over the land creating rivers, waterways and lakes. It is thought that the Wagyl created the Swan River.

== See also ==
- List of islands of Perth, Western Australia

== Sources ==
- Brearley, Anne (2005). Ernest Hodgkin's Swanland: Estuaries and Coastal Lagoons of South-western Australia. Crawley: University of Western Australia Press for the Ernest Hodgkin Trust for Estuary Education and Research and National Trust of Australia (WA). ISBN 978-1-920694-38-8. "Re the 1926 flood: floodwaters spread over 5 kilometres at Guildford, and covered large areas of Perth Esplanade, and South Perth... and 12,729 million litres cascaded over Mundaring Weir"
- Broomhall, Susan; Pickering, Gina, eds. (2012). Rivers of Emotion: an Emotional History of Derbarl Yerrigan and Djarlgarro Beelier (the Swan and Canning rivers) (PDF). Crawley: Uniprint. ISBN 978-1-74052-260-1. OCLC 820979809.
- Dalrymple, Alexander (7 January 1780). Plan of the Island Rottenest, (ie Rats Nest) lying off The West Coast of New Holland, from Vankeulen. Black Swan River on New Holland, opposite Rottenest Island, from Vankeulen (Map). Writing by T. Harmar. London: Hydrographical Office.
- Péron, François; Freycinet, Louis (1809). A Voyage of Discovery to the Southern Hemisphere: Performed by Order of the Emperor Napoleon during the Years 1801, 1802, and 1804. London: Richard Phillips. OCLC 6521670. OL 6948659M. Wikidata Q128790983.
- Péron, François (2012) [1809]. "Chapter XI". A Voyage of Discovery to the Southern Hemisphere: Performed by Order of the Emperor Napoleon, during the Years 1801, 1802, 1803, and 1804. Project Gutenberg Australia. Wikidata Q128749102.
- Seddon, George; Ravine, David (1986). A City and its Setting: Images of Perth, Western Australia. Fremantle: Fremantle Press. ISBN 0-949206-08-3. LCCN 87131959. OCLC 16866226. OL 2438825M. Wikidata Q135222492.
