= List of watercourses in Western Australia, M =

Western Australia has many watercourses with gazetted names, including rivers, streams, brooks, creeks, gullies, anabranches and backwaters.

This list is complete with respect to the 1996 Gazetteer of Australia. Dubious names have been checked against the online 2004 data, and in all cases confirmed correct. However, if any watercourses have been gazetted or deleted since 1996, this list does not reflect these changes. Strictly speaking, Australian place names are gazetted in capital letters only; the names in this list have been converted to mixed case in accordance with normal capitalisation conventions. Locations are as gazetted; some watercourses may extend over long distances.

== M ==
Name	Latitude	Longitude	Remarks
Mabel Spring Creek	17° 5' 0" S	128° 11' 13" E	
Mabinup Creek	34° 15' 24" S	118° 10' 37" E	
Mac Creek	17° 6' 26" S	124° 50' 13" E	
Macdermott Brook	33° 1' 55" S	116° 52' 41" E	
Mackie River	31° 56' 29" S	116° 48' 38" E	
Macklin Creek	21° 24' 43" S	116° 22' 0" E	
Macnamara Creek	17° 6' 30" S	126° 9' 29" E	
Macphee Creek	16° 10' 9" S	128° 20' 31" E	
Macpherson Creek	21° 55' 42" S	121° 8' 54" E	
Mad Mile Creek	17° 8' 47" S	125° 50' 27" E	
Madderberring Creek	32° 31' 6" S	117° 0' 27" E	
Madeline Creek	25° 48' 58" S	115° 39' 50" E	
Madgebup Creek	33° 54' 22" S	117° 28' 27" E	
Madonga Creek	24° 53' 54" S	116° 22' 29" E	
Maggie Creek	15° 40' 51" S	128° 15' 58" E	
Maggie Creek	19° 4' 59" S	127° 8' 26" E	
Mahogany Creek	31° 53' 3" S	116° 5' 43" E	
Maidenhair Gully	33° 38' 32" S	115° 41' 35" E	
Mail Creek	17° 0' 34" S	125° 32' 11" E	
Maileeup Creek	34° 4' 17" S	118° 13' 10" E	
Mailling Gully	33° 15' 4" S	117° 5' 8" E	
Mainroads Creek	15° 0' 16" S	126° 6' 55" E	
Maitland River	20° 46' 37" S	116° 30' 38" E	
Makoyup Creek	34° 42' 1" S	117° 15' 7" E	
Malbup Creek	33° 37' 32" S	115° 25' 38" E	
Malcolm Creek	15° 5' 28" S	128° 4' 39" E	
Maleta Creek	28° 51' 4" S	121° 43' 57" E	
Malkup Brook	31° 33' 43" S	116° 19' 38" E	
Mallabine Creek	31° 36' 31" S	116° 41' 19" E	
Mallina Creek	21° 51' 38" S	117° 41' 40" E	
Mamundo Creek	16° 15' 31" S	125° 24' 27" E	
Manaring Brook	33° 1' 16" S	117° 2' 29" E	
Manarrah Creek	23° 59' 31" S	113° 57' 7" E	
Mandalup Brook	33° 49' 3" S	117° 6' 37" E	
Mandu Mandu Creek	22° 8' 46" S	113° 52' 6" E	
Manganese Creek	24° 26' 47" S	118° 27' 49" E	
Mangaroon Creek	23° 59' 8" S	115° 41' 18" E	
Mangiding Brook	32° 17' 43" S	116° 59' 20" E	
Mangrove Creek	19° 1' 0" S	121° 32' 38" E	
Mangrove Creek	20° 0' 34" S	119° 18' 11" E	
Mangrove Creek	16° 41' 28" S	124° 0' 15" E	
Manguel Creek	17° 49' 37" S	123° 37' 51" E	
Manguel Creek	18° 2' 33" S	123° 29' 37" E	
Manjedal Brook	32° 16' 32" S	115° 57' 47" E	
Manjimup Brook	34° 14' 15" S	116° 11' 7" E	
Manning Creek	16° 42' 15" S	125° 56' 6" E	
Manns Gully	31° 58' 1" S	116° 12' 18" E	
Mantinea Creek	15° 36' 33" S	128° 33' 40" E	
Manton Creek	26° 41' 20" S	126° 20' 19" E	
Manyutup Creek	33° 39' 12" S	119° 55' 24" E	
Manyutup Creek	33° 37' 1" S	120° 0' 23" E	
Maplestead Gully	32° 30' 48" S	117° 4' 34" E	
Maralla Creek	31° 44' 41" S	116° 0' 32" E	
Maranup Brook	33° 56' 31" S	116° 1' 31" E	
Marbellup Creek	33° 55' 35" S	122° 5' 35" E	
Marbelup Brook	35° 1' 10" S	117° 43' 52" E	
Marbling Brook	31° 34' 21" S	116° 5' 58" E	
March Fly Creek	16° 39' 37" S	128° 12' 12" E	
Marda Brook	31° 39' 47" S	116° 6' 52" E	
Mardeerara Creek	21° 27' 37" S	116° 47' 2" E	
Mardie Creek	21° 11' 17" S	115° 56' 6" E	
Margaret River (Kimberley)	18° 10' 24" S	125° 37' 5" E	
Margaret River (South West)	33° 58' 11" S	114° 58' 59" E	
Margaret River North	33° 52' 34" S	115° 17' 24" E	
Margerin Brook	31° 21' 56" S	116° 50' 27" E	
Marillana Creek	22° 47' 8" S	119° 13' 50" E	
Maringup Creek	34° 49' 30" S	116° 10' 20" E	
Marionvale Creek	31° 52' 51" S	116° 12' 12" E	
Markes Creek	34° 45' 28" S	116° 14' 5" E	
Marling Gully	33° 5' 31" S	116° 38' 44" E	
Marnipurl Creek	20° 43' 56" S	117° 44' 21" E	
Marradong Brook	32° 53' 6" S	116° 24' 57" E	
Marramine Gully	32° 59' 16" S	117° 19' 14" E	
Marramucking Creek	33° 3' 55" S	117° 19' 9" E	
Marrinup Brook	32° 42' 26" S	115° 53' 50" E	
Marshall Creek	21° 29' 6" S	119° 32' 8" E	
Marshall Creek	28° 27' 5" S	120° 52' 32" E	
Martacup Creek	34° 4' 2" S	118° 7' 25" E	
Martaquin Creek	34° 13' 49" S	118° 14' 22" E	
Martin Creek	34° 3' 23" S	119° 29' 2" E	
Martinap Gully	32° 38' 47" S	116° 36' 19" E	
Martinup Creek	33° 58' 39" S	117° 54' 5" E	
Mary Brook	33° 42' 18" S	115° 10' 2" E	
Mary Creek	16° 30' 9" S	126° 30' 35" E	
Mary River	18° 43' 19" S	126° 50' 14" E	
Mary Springs Creek	27° 50' 1" S	114° 39' 20" E	
Mason Gully	29° 52' 11" S	128° 2' 45" E	
Massey Creek	15° 4' 23" S	125° 42' 26" E	
Matchbox Creek	16° 1' 59" S	128° 48' 45" E	
Matilda River	33° 15' 29" S	115° 57' 6" E	
Mattabandup Creek	34° 37' 4" S	116° 36' 5" E	
Maude Creek	16° 45' 33" S	127° 52' 2" E	
Maudie Creek	16° 15' 58" S	125° 35' 51" E	
Maurice Creek	16° 17' 28" S	125° 38' 10" E	
Maxwell Creek	15° 51' 36" S	128° 46' 42" E	
May Creek	22° 37' 40" S	122° 24' 22" E	
May Creek	16° 26' 12" S	128° 56' 2" E	
May River	17° 12' 34" S	123° 54' 43" E	
Mazzarol Creek	15° 50' 30" S	127° 30' 57" E	
Mcatee Brook	34° 2' 39" S	115° 35' 28" E	
Mccrea Creek	31° 56' 30" S	118° 2' 26" E	
Mcdonald Creek	14° 50' 39" S	126° 13' 57" E	
Mcguire Creek	23° 59' 36" S	116° 1' 5" E	
Mckay Creek	23° 3' 53" S	122° 52' 46" E	
Mckay Creek	28° 55' 26" S	124° 50' 46" E	
Mckay Creek	21° 0' 37" S	116° 17' 31" E	
Mckelson Creek	18° 49' 2" S	121° 39' 0" E	
Mckenzie Creek	27° 40' 18" S	120° 55' 38" E	
Mckinnon Creek	18° 1' 11" S	126° 38' 28" E	
Mcknoe Brook	32° 52' 18" S	115° 55' 43" E	
Mclachlan Creek	16° 21' 5" S	127° 14' 56" E	
Mcleod Creek	34° 9' 31" S	115° 10' 45" E	
Mcphee Creek	20° 58' 36" S	119° 5' 59" E	
Mcphee Creek	21° 41' 57" S	120° 15' 31" E	
Mcqueen Brook	33° 8' 35" S	117° 2' 35" E	
Mcrae River	15° 37' 28" S	124° 53' 12" E	
Mcsherry Creek	17° 27' 0" S	124° 49' 4" E	
Meda River	16° 58' 13" S	123° 49' 34" E	
Medulla Brook	32° 19' 47" S	115° 58' 4" E	
Meekatharra Creek	26° 34' 56" S	118° 21' 44" E	
Meelarrie Creek	15° 40' 15" S	126° 23' 49" E	
Meelup Brook	33° 34' 48" S	115° 4' 36" E	
Meenaar South Creek	31° 41' 49" S	116° 52' 49" E	
Meerup River	34° 39' 31" S	115° 52' 59" E	
Meetyou Creek	19° 57' 59" S	119° 52' 59" E	
Meeyip Branch	32° 34' 52" S	115° 45' 45" E	
Meinmuggin Gully	33° 18' 23" S	117° 39' 48" E	
Melango Creek	26° 43' 33" S	126° 22' 55" E	
Melbong Creek	31° 46' 56" S	116° 55' 1" E	
Melford Creek	20° 55' 52" S	116° 33' 15" E	
Melia Creek	27° 29' 44" S	115° 38' 55" E	
Mellon Hole Creek	18° 17' 16" S	125° 34' 51" E	
Melon Creek	15° 24' 45" S	128° 53' 16" E	
Mendena Creek	15° 8' 41" S	127° 53' 31" E	
Merdeperup Creek	34° 36' 52" S	117° 17' 14" E	
Merilup Creek	33° 18' 22" S	118° 7' 39" E	
Merougil Creek	31° 13' 41" S	121° 38' 13" E	
Merralls Gully	31° 38' 16" S	119° 35' 25" E	
Merrigup Creek	34° 9' 16" S	118° 40' 30" E	
Merriup Creek	34° 38' 52" S	117° 36' 38" E	
Mertens Creek	14° 49' 25" S	125° 41' 42" E	
Messmate Creek	16° 46' 34" S	125° 45' 54" E	
Metawandy Creek	22° 44' 11" S	116° 8' 19" E	
Mettabinup Brook	34° 4' 21" S	116° 50' 2" E	
Mia Mia Creek	32° 33' 7" S	116° 7' 23" E	
Miaboolya Creek	24° 48' 29" S	113° 37' 57" E	
Miamup Brook	33° 50' 31" S	114° 59' 33" E	
Mibbeyean Creek	25° 37' 20" S	120° 3' 15" E	
Michibin Gully	32° 39' 33" S	116° 39' 40" E	
Middle Branch Creek	17° 40' 2" S	127° 8' 19" E	
Middle Brook	31° 54' 15" S	116° 16' 5" E	
Middle Creek	16° 29' 47" S	126° 57' 58" E	
Middle Creek	18° 43' 5" S	121° 40' 18" E	
Middle Creek	21° 46' 37" S	120° 18' 54" E	
Middle Creek	17° 22' 12" S	127° 26' 41" E	
Middle Creek	34° 53' 37" S	116° 36' 32" E	
Middle Creek	18° 6' 19" S	125° 53' 42" E	
Middle Gorge Creek	24° 12' 29" S	118° 2' 26" E	
Middle Springs Creek	24° 42' 52" S	116° 51' 15" E	
Middleton River	16° 4' 34" S	124° 51' 48" E	
Midgengadge Creek	21° 21' 55" S	121° 2' 24" E	
Milgarrie Creek	26° 16' 12" S	122° 39' 43" E	
Mill Brook	33° 22' 46" S	115° 54' 53" E	
Mill Brook	33° 33' 20" S	115° 46' 27" E	
Mill Brook	34° 56' 11" S	117° 52' 58" E	
Mill Brook	33° 50' 35" S	115° 39' 58" E	
Mill Creek	34° 12' 36" S	116° 9' 49" E	
Mill Stream	21° 34' 19" S	117° 3' 10" E	
Millard Creek	18° 44' 35" S	126° 3' 35" E	
Millars Creek	34° 57' 33" S	117° 21' 15" E	
Miller Creek	20° 58' 7" S	117° 2' 10" E	
Milli Creek	22° 52' 21" S	118° 7' 25" E	
Millidie Creek	25° 45' 58" S	118° 18' 50" E	
Milligan Creek	16° 34' 43" S	122° 57' 6" E	
Millinedin Creek	22° 12' 23" S	121° 3' 55" E	
Mills Creek	31° 56' 15" S	116° 4' 16" E	
Milyeannup Brook	34° 5' 29" S	115° 33' 44" E	
Mimbi Creek	18° 44' 37" S	126° 2' 58" E	
Mina Creek	17° 7' 41" S	125° 19' 8" E	
Minajibby Creek	25° 52' 59" S	117° 6' 48" E	
Minchin Creek	31° 49' 42" S	116° 0' 4" E	
Mindjau Creek	14° 42' 5" S	125° 55' 43" E	
Mindy Mindy Creek	22° 44' 8" S	119° 31' 17" E	
Mindyegillup Creek	34° 36' 36" S	117° 54' 8" E	
Minelup Creek	33° 25' 11" S	118° 35' 29" E	
Minga Creek	25° 3' 57" S	115° 50' 44" E	
Mingah Creek	24° 52' 38" S	118° 43' 27" E	
Mingah Creek	26° 31' 17" S	117° 58' 29" E	
Minilya River	23° 51' 7" S	113° 56' 6" E	
Minilya River South	23° 57' 3" S	115° 5' 7" E	
Minindi Creek	24° 49' 57" S	116° 10' 49" E	
Mininer Creek	23° 35' 39" S	117° 25' 2" E	
Miningarra Creek	20° 43' 27" S	120° 18' 33" E	
Miningarra Creek	26° 17' 0" S	122° 20' 4" E	
Mininup Brook	33° 34' 46" S	115° 50' 21" E	
Minjoogup Branch	32° 40' 45" S	115° 45' 49" E	
Minkadine Brook	31° 40' 26" S	117° 41' 22" E	
Minmeroora Creek	21° 42' 0" S	116° 32' 43" E	
Minnie Creek	17° 13' 5" S	126° 15' 48" E	
Minnie Creek	27° 58' 14" S	123° 43' 10" E	
Minnie Creek	24° 1' 24" S	115° 40' 37" E	
Minnie Minnie Creek	18° 35' 22" S	125° 22' 7" E	
Minnie River	17° 42' 25" S	123° 34' 29" E	
Minniearra Creek	24° 43' 5" S	116° 43' 11" E	
Minnieritchie Creek	23° 25' 53" S	115° 31' 10" E	
Minnieritchie Creek	25° 24' 39" S	117° 12' 16" E	
Minnieritchie Creek	26° 19' 0" S	122° 17' 43" E	
Minniging Brook	32° 56' 36" S	116° 56' 27" E	
Minnoo Creek	27° 56' 4" S	114° 38' 23" E	
Minor Creek	22° 44' 25" S	117° 52' 8" E	
Minyulo Brook	30° 44' 34" S	115° 28' 54" E	
Miralga Creek	20° 58' 11" S	119° 23' 5" E	
Miss Harkness Creek	26° 51' 0" S	126° 18' 45" E	
Mistake Creek	16° 30' 49" S	126° 24' 5" E	
Mistake Creek	31° 37' 27" S	116° 33' 55" E	
Mistake Creek	15° 7' 17" S	128° 34' 17" E	
Mistake Creek	16° 56' 43" S	128° 15' 51" E	
Mistake Creek	16° 18' 19" S	128° 58' 58" E	
Mistake Creek	27° 56' 50" S	122° 17' 31" E	
Mistake Creek	17° 1' 11" S	128° 8' 54" E	
Mitchell River	34° 53' 19" S	117° 29' 14" E	
Mitchell River	14° 38' 49" S	125° 38' 52" E	
Mitchinson Creek	31° 38' 19" S	116° 45' 18" E	
Mogurnda Creek	15° 1' 56" S	126° 54' 36" E	
Mohr Creek	28° 18' 47" S	123° 23' 54" E	
Moitch Creek	34° 20' 12" S	118° 39' 44" E	
Moiyoo Creek	14° 18' 57" S	126° 38' 45" E	
Mokerdillup Brook	34° 2' 22" S	116° 2' 59" E	
Mokine Brook	31° 43' 11" S	116° 34' 39" E	
Molly Spring Creek	15° 50' 25" S	128° 29' 14" E	
Mombo Creek	24° 54' 27" S	115° 54' 37" E	
Momorinyam Creek	15° 31' 20" S	124° 37' 2" E	
Mondooma Creek	16° 50' 26" S	124° 24' 57" E	
Monger Creek	14° 13' 55" S	126° 34' 31" E	
Mongitup Creek	34° 7' 54" S	118° 45' 19" E	
Mongonai Creek	14° 30' 29" S	126° 31' 47" E	
Monjebup Creek	34° 16' 52" S	118° 37' 42" E	
Monjerducking Gully	32° 13' 55" S	117° 1' 32" E	
Monkey Creek	24° 5' 8" S	119° 7' 28" E	
Monkey Creek	23° 34' 36" S	115° 5' 53" E	
Monty Creek	26° 42' 20" S	126° 24' 34" E	
Moochalabra Creek	15° 37' 7" S	128° 6' 29" E	
Moogarooga Creek	15° 5' 35" S	129° 0' 0" E	
Moojebing Creek	33° 30' 3" S	117° 30' 38" E	
Mooka Creek	24° 58' 34" S	114° 53' 35" E	
Mookine Creek	33° 6' 38" S	117° 16' 42" E	
Moolamin Brook	32° 55' 50" S	116° 9' 53" E	
Mooloo Creek	25° 3' 44" S	115° 50' 51" E	
Moolyall Creek	33° 23' 41" S	120° 7' 10" E	
Moolyella Creek	21° 5' 58" S	119° 52' 25" E	
Moomagul Gully	32° 39' 47" S	116° 49' 14" E	
Moonda Brook	31° 20' 27" S	115° 55' 32" E	
Moondle Creek	21° 2' 6" S	116° 40' 5" E	
Moondyne Brook	31° 37' 46" S	116° 11' 4" E	
Mooralup Brook	34° 18' 44" S	116° 23' 45" E	
Moorapulling Creek	32° 53' 20" S	116° 28' 11" E	
Moorayana Creek	25° 11' 22" S	116° 43' 43" E	
Moore River	31° 21' 16" S	115° 29' 48" E	
Moore River East	31° 0' 57" S	116° 0' 6" E	
Mooreebar Creek	31° 10' 5" S	121° 42' 40" E	
Moorialup Creek	34° 42' 36" S	118° 3' 13" E	
Mooriary Gully	29° 12' 47" S	115° 17' 29" E	
Moorungup Creek	34° 1' 18" S	118° 54' 5" E	
Mopilup Brook	34° 8' 44" S	116° 33' 17" E	
Moran River	15° 15' 56" S	125° 33' 23" E	
Morangup Brook	31° 34' 57" S	116° 19' 1" E	
Morbining Gully	32° 13' 35" S	117° 13' 44" E	
Mordalup Creek	34° 16' 38" S	116° 38' 25" E	
Morgan River	14° 46' 14" S	126° 46' 19" E	
Morling Brook	32° 34' 55" S	117° 26' 21" E	
Morning Gully	32° 20' 26" S	117° 10' 51" E	
Mornington Creek	33° 10' 42" S	115° 51' 1" E	
Mornington River	33° 11' 55" S	115° 47' 18" E	
Morrell Creek	31° 38' 31" S	116° 44' 53" E	
Morrissey Creek	24° 35' 55" S	116° 3' 5" E	
Mortigup Brook	31° 34' 7" S	116° 17' 45" E	
Mortlock Creek	30° 47' 25" S	116° 34' 44" E	
Mortlock River	31° 38' 47" S	116° 40' 15" E	
Mortlock River East	31° 42' 29" S	116° 54' 53" E	
Mortlock River North	31° 38' 33" S	116° 41' 32" E	
Moses Creek	26° 24' 38" S	128° 30' 15" E	
Mosquito Creek	21° 49' 29" S	120° 29' 29" E	
Mosquito Creek	18° 50' 6" S	126° 28' 54" E	
Moulmolen Gully	32° 5' 56" S	117° 0' 25" E	
Moulton Brook	33° 52' 3" S	116° 2' 17" E	
Mount Anvil Gully	31° 21' 50" S	116° 29' 58" E	
Mount Brook	34° 12' 36" S	115° 57' 5" E	
Mount Creek	21° 5' 28" S	120° 0' 57" E	
Mount Creek	26° 19' 0" S	116° 54' 5" E	
Mount Folly Creek	33° 59' 3" S	115° 46' 17" E	
Mount Fraser Creek	25° 43' 41" S	118° 14' 30" E	
Mount Gascoyne Creek	25° 6' 14" S	116° 28' 26" E	
Mount Hardman Creek	18° 16' 24" S	124° 34' 53" E	
Mount James Creek	24° 52' 33" S	116° 21' 36" E	
Mount Jetty Creek	30° 32' 27" S	115° 13' 29" E	
Mount Mary Brook	31° 42' 42" S	116° 44' 28" E	
Mount North Creek	17° 24' 8" S	124° 46' 54" E	
Mount Pierre Creek	18° 15' 55" S	125° 52' 56" E	
Mount Sydney Creek	21° 19' 49" S	121° 3' 42" E	
Mount Wellard Creek	21° 7' 59" S	117° 22' 59" E	
Mount Wynne Creek	17° 48' 14" S	125° 4' 59" E	
Mountain Creek	18° 4' 49" S	128° 12' 0" E	
Mountain Creek	17° 23' 51" S	126° 3' 21" E	
Mountain Creek	17° 36' 58" S	128° 38' 34" E	
Mountain Creek	23° 16' 52" S	115° 19' 6" E	
Mowbowra Creek	22° 0' 7" S	114° 7' 20" E	
Mowen River	33° 57' 0" S	115° 16' 49" E	
Moxon Creek	27° 22' 19" S	122° 49' 3" E	
Mucalana Creek	24° 1' 40" S	117° 59' 2" E	
Mud Spring Creek	16° 38' 24" S	128° 52' 26" E	
Muddauthera Creek	21° 33' 34" S	121° 10' 59" E	
Mudgianna Creek	26° 53' 42" S	116° 38' 3" E	
Mudjalla Gully	18° 2' 9" S	123° 49' 41" E	
Mugoda Creek	27° 29' 20" S	116° 22' 43" E	
Mujiting Brook	32° 55' 1" S	117° 1' 54" E	
Mukalo Creek	25° 51' 27" S	117° 18' 47" E	
Mulabula Creek	27° 25' 22" S	116° 41' 4" E	
Muldolia Creek	31° 25' 34" S	121° 35' 0" E	
Mule Creek	16° 58' 21" S	128° 4' 38" E	
Mule Creek	16° 48' 14" S	128° 24' 13" E	
Mulga Wash	24° 4' 8" S	116° 53' 45" E	
Mulgabiddy Creek	28° 13' 7" S	123° 15' 27" E	
Mulgandinnah Creek	21° 26' 36" S	119° 21' 28" E	
Mulindjara Creek	15° 12' 23" S	127° 55' 4" E	
Mulla Mulla Creek	27° 29' 28" S	115° 15' 56" E	
Mulla Mulla Down Creek	20° 1' 28" S	119° 29' 11" E	
Mullalangg Creek	18° 23' 36" S	128° 28' 15" E	
Mullalyup Brook	33° 47' 1" S	115° 57' 26" E	
Mullarra Creek	23° 25' 27" S	115° 38' 6" E	
Mullarup Creek	34° 42' 4" S	118° 2' 7" E	
Mullering Brook	30° 39' 4" S	115° 20' 42" E	
Mullewa Creek	28° 59' 40" S	115° 28' 25" E	
Mullidup Brook	33° 58' 6" S	117° 48' 33" E	
Mullocullop Creek	34° 43' 6" S	118° 27' 38" E	
Mulloo Creek	28° 24' 1" S	116° 51' 17" E	
Mullumberry Creek	24° 3' 9" S	114° 57' 32" E	
Muluckine Creek	31° 40' 17" S	116° 43' 41" E	
Mumba Creek	25° 14' 17" S	116° 12' 37" E	
Munbinea Creek	30° 18' 12" S	115° 11' 41" E	
Munday Brook	32° 1' 58" S	116° 3' 1" E	
Mundurrul River	16° 16' 18" S	123° 38' 37" E	
Mungala Brook	31° 18' 5" S	115° 45' 9" E	
Mungarathoona Creek	21° 43' 9" S	115° 59' 35" E	
Mungarra Creek	25° 0' 49" S	115° 11' 10" E	
Mungerding Brook	32° 1' 16" S	117° 3' 9" E	
Mungilan Creek	31° 26' 0" S	116° 50' 8" E	
Mungliginup Creek	33° 53' 18" S	122° 39' 24" E	
Munglinup River	33° 47' 7" S	120° 50' 14" E	
Mungnedum Creek	16° 36' 25" S	125° 21' 18" E	
Mungoona Creek	21° 20' 31" S	118° 24' 44" E	
Mungoona Creek	21° 34' 59" S	118° 14' 58" E	
Munjina Creek	22° 21' 47" S	118° 44' 31" E	
Munnapin Brook	31° 33' 30" S	116° 18' 35" E	
Munni Munni Creek	20° 59' 46" S	116° 47' 27" E	
Munyerring Brook	31° 25' 6" S	116° 11' 7" E	
Muranine Gully	31° 48' 35" S	116° 22' 26" E	
Murchison River	27° 42' 27" S	114° 9' 36" E	
Murilee Creek	23° 51' 44" S	115° 44' 58" E	
Murramuralba Creek	21° 10' 1" S	120° 54' 42" E	
Murray Camp Creek	20° 52' 17" S	117° 8' 51" E	
Murray Creek	26° 4' 39" S	125° 12' 54" E	
Murray Ford Brook	32° 45' 22" S	116° 0' 53" E	
Murray River	32° 35' 0" S	115° 46' 17" E	
Murrin Brook	33° 58' 22" S	116° 58' 22" E	
Murrum Creek	26° 35' 47" S	116° 22' 6" E	
Murrumuralba Creek	21° 19' 59" S	120° 52' 59" E	
Mussel Creek	17° 53' 33" S	127° 39' 33" E	
My Creek	18° 32' 3" S	123° 26' 11" E	
Myanore Creek	21° 20' 59" S	115° 50' 41" E	
Myara Brook	32° 25' 36" S	115° 57' 54" E	
Myrong Creek	23° 26' 45" S	115° 58' 43" E	

== See also ==
- Geography of Western Australia
