= Wooroloo Brook =

River in Western Australia

Wooroloo Brook is a watercourse that runs through the Darling Range in Western Australia. It is a tributary which converges with the Avon River to form the Swan River.

The name of the brook is also the name of a number of features and organisations, including the Wooroloo Brook Landcare Group, the Wooroloo Brook Land Conservation District Committee.

The brook alignment had been considered a possible route for the connection of the railway routes occurring at the time of the development of the Trans-Australian Railway.

The locality of Wooroloo is in the upper reaches of the catchment.

The catchment runs through the locality of Gidgegannup and the confluence with the Avon River is where the Swan River commences.
