= Guildford Railway Bridge =

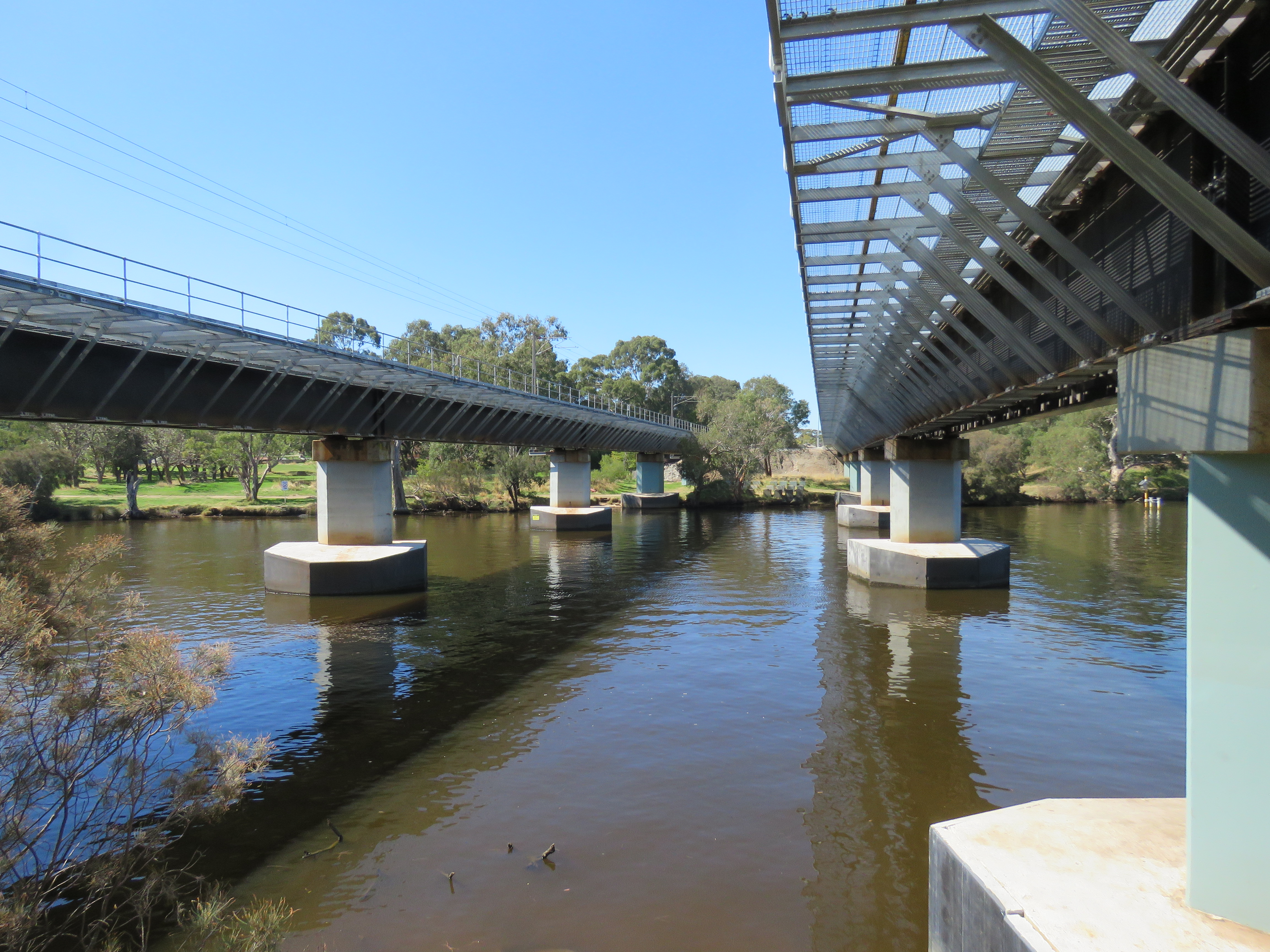
- The two bridges side-by-side
- Coordinates: 31°53′58″S 115°57′38″E
- Carries: Eastern railway line
- Crosses: Swan River
- Begins: Guildford
- Ends: Bassendean
- Owner: Public Transport Authority

Characteristics
- Material: Steel
- Piers in water: 5

Rail characteristics
- Track gauge: 1,067 mm (3 ft 6 in); 1,435 mm (4 ft 8 1/2 in)

History
- Constructed by: John Holland
- Opened: 1st: 15 June 1969; 2nd: 12 October 1975

Location
- Interactive map of Guildford Railway Bridge

The Guildford Railway Bridge is a pair of bridges that carry the Eastern railway line across the Swan River in Perth, Western Australia.

== History ==
The original bridge was a timber viaduct that opened in 1880 as a combined rail and road bridge. In February 1898, a new two track bridge opened downstream. In 1939 the original timber trusses were replaced by steel girders. The original bridge remained as a road bridge and later a foot bridge until demolished in the late 1960s.

As part of the project to standardise the line from Kalgoorlie to Perth, on 15 June 1969 a new single track standard gauge steel girder bridge on concrete supports built by John Holland opened. The existing bridge was retained for narrow gauge services.

On 12 October 1975, an identical steel girder bridge opened on the site of the 1880 structure. It was built as a dual gauge structure with the 1969 bridge also converted to dual gauge allowing the 1898 bridges to be demolished.
