= Avon River (Western Australia) =

Avon
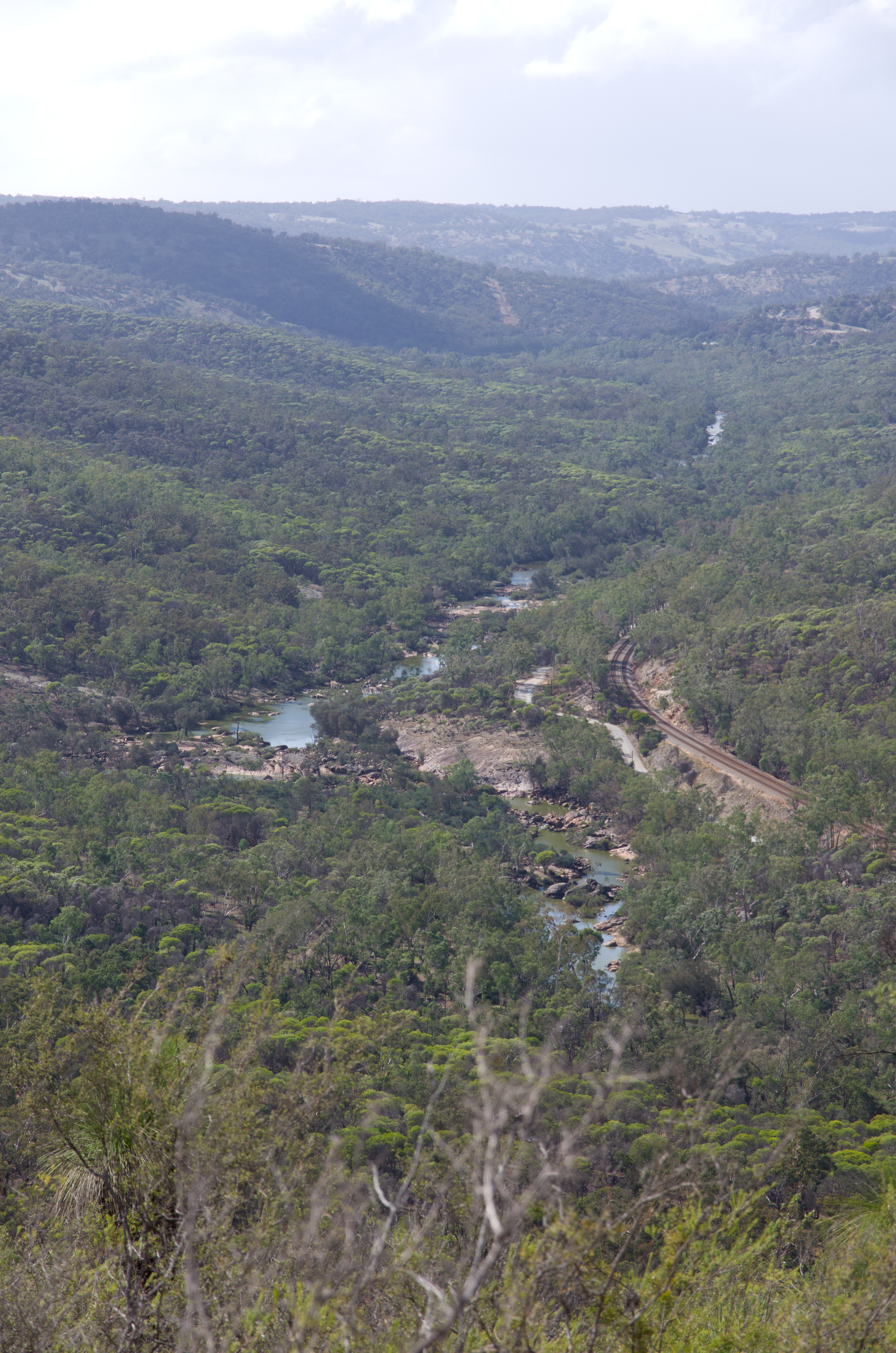
- Avon River flowing through the Avon Valley National Park

- Location within Western Australia
- Avon (●, upstream) and Swan (●, downstream) rivers, collectively known sometimes as the Swan-Avon River

Location
- Country: Australia
- State: Western Australia
- Region: Wheatbelt

Physical characteristics
- Source: Surface runoff
  - location: East of Pingelly
  - coordinates: 32°44′52″S 117°28′0″E
  - elevation: 269 m (883 ft)
- Mouth: Confluence with Wooroloo Brook to form the Swan River
  - location: below Mount Mambup
  - coordinates: 31°44′34″S 116°4′4″E
  - elevation: 29 m (95 ft)
- Length: 200 km (120 mi)
- Basin size: 120,000–126,000 km^{2} (46,000–49,000 sq mi)
- Discharge
  - location: mouth
  - average: 10 m^{3}/s (350 cu ft/s)

Basin features
- River system: Swan River
- Tributaries
  - left: Dale River
  - right: Mackie River, Mortlock River, Brockman River
- National park: Avon Valley National Park

The Avon River is a river in Western Australia. It flows for around 200 kilometres (120 mi) with a catchment area of 120,000–126,000 square kilometres (46,000–49,000 sq mi) in the state's Wheatbelt region. When the Avon reaches the Wooroloo Brook in the Walyunga National Park it becomes the Swan River, which flows through the Perth metropolitan area to its mouth at Fremantle Harbour.

== Naming and terminology ==
The Avon River and the Swan River are the same watercourse. By convention, the name Avon is used upstream of the confluence with the Wooroloo Brook in the Walyunga National Park, with the name Swan then used until the river mouth at Fremantle Harbour. This naming convention has been described as a "historical anomaly". For that reason, the main branch of the river system is sometimes referred to as the Swan–Avon River. Technical sources regard the Swan–Avon and Canning rivers as separate rivers flowing into a single body of water at Melville Water, called the Swan–Canning Estuary, rather than treating the Canning River as a tributary of the Swan River. This distinction was noted as early as 1827 by James Stirling.

== Avon catchment area ==
Lake Yealering in the Shire of Wickepin is the point of origin for the upper Avon River, and the catchment size above the confluence with the Salt River at Yenyening Lakes is 91,500 square kilometres (35,300 sq mi).

The basin covers much of the Western Australian wheatbelt and extends beyond that in some areas near almost-always-dry Lake Moore in the northeast, water is received regularly from only the extreme western edge of the basin. Indeed, until an abnormally wet year in 1963 it was not realised that the northeastern part of the basin beyond Wongan Hills ever drained water into the river. Under present climatic conditions, it is almost impossible to produce runoff from anywhere outside the extreme west of the basin because the amount of rain required to fall before runoff would begin is as high or higher than the mean annual rainfall. The river has three main sub-catchments: catchments for the Mortlock, Yilgarn, and Lockhart rivers.

The river flows past County Peak, creating "a sweeping panoramic view" from the top.

=== Course and features ===
Thirty creeks and rivers flow into the Avon; some of the larger tributaries include the Dale River, Brockman River, Mortlock River and the Mackie River. Most of these watercourses are ephemeral and only flow after rain in winter and spring.

Some permanent pools exist along the course of the river including Burlong Pool, Robins Pool, Long Pool, Cobblers Pool and Jimperding Pool.

The Avon River Valley is the third and final route for the Eastern Railway line through the Darling Scarp between Midland and Northam, having been constructed in the 1960s.

It is the site of an annual whitewater boating event, the Avon Descent.

== Soils ==
Due to the extraordinary age of the soils in the basin (which is on the extremely ancient Yilgarn craton), the rooting density of native flora is very high and its average specific discharge is probably the lowest of any basin of comparable size in the world. The extreme age of the soils also means that, at least after clearing for agriculture, almost all rivers in the basin have salinities above 0.3% (one-tenth that of the oceans and eight times that necessary to qualify as "fresh" water) and some much more than that.

Passing through some of the oldest settled European agricultural areas in Western Australia, the catchment area has extensive soil salinity issues, which have attracted governmental programmes to alleviate the loss of agricultural lands. Catchment groups that oversee projects in the tributary parts of the river have had considerable support and funding from commercial and non-governmental sources as well.

== See also ==
- List of watercourses in Western Australia

== Sources ==
- "Natural Attractions in Beverley". Beverley. n.d.
- "Tourist Road at County Peak". The Beverley Times. Vol. 62, no. 22. Western Australia. 10 June 1966. p. 1 – via National Library of Australia .
- Brearley, Anne (2005). Ernest Hodgkin's Swanland: Estuaries and Coastal Lagoons of Southwestern Australia. University of Western Australia Press. ISBN 1-920694-38-2.
- "Discover the Swan Canning Riverpark". Perth: Department of Biodiversity, Conservation and Attractions, Government of Western Australia. 2026. "Above Walyunga, the Swan is called the Avon River, although both waterways are actually the same river. The combined Swan-Avon River is 280 km [170 mi] long and flows from near Wickepin. The Swan-Avon River drains a total catchment of approximately 126,000 km^{2} [49,000 sq mi]."
- Managing Waterways in the Avon Wheatbelt: Field Guide (PDF) (Report). Perth: Department of Water, Government of Western Australia. 2008. Archived from the original (PDF) on 26 March 2012.
- "Avon River". Department of Water and Environmental Regulation. Government of Western Australia. 2026. "The Avon River travels from Lake Yealering near Wickepin for around 200 km [120 mi] to Walyunga National Park, where it joins with Wooroloo Brook and becomes the Swan River. The Swan River flows a further 72 km [45 mi] to the Indian Ocean at Fremantle, making the combined length of the Swan-Avon Rivers about 280 km [170 mi]."
- Read, Viv (2008). Lower Avon River Recovery Plan: Incorporating Foreshore and Channel Assessment (PDF) (Report). River Recovery Plan (RRP). Perth: Department of Water, Government of Western Australia. ISBN 978-1-921094-83-5. ISSN 1835-9515.
- "The Swan-Avon Catchments". Describing the Swan River. State Library of Western Australia. n.d.
- "The Avon and Mortlock River system". Wheatbelt Natural Resource Management. 2011. Archived from the original on 19 February 2011. "The Avon River originates at Lake Yealering in the Shire of Wickepin. The catchment area upstream of the confluence with the Salt River at Yenyening Lake is 91,500 km^{2} [35,300 sq mi]. The Mortlock river system has a catchment area of 16,800 km^{2} [6,500 sq mi] and joins the Avon River at Northam. The catchment area for the combined Avon River and Mortlock River system is 24,900 km^{2} [9,600 sq mi]."
