= Walyunga National Park =

National park in Western Australia

- IUCN category II (national park)
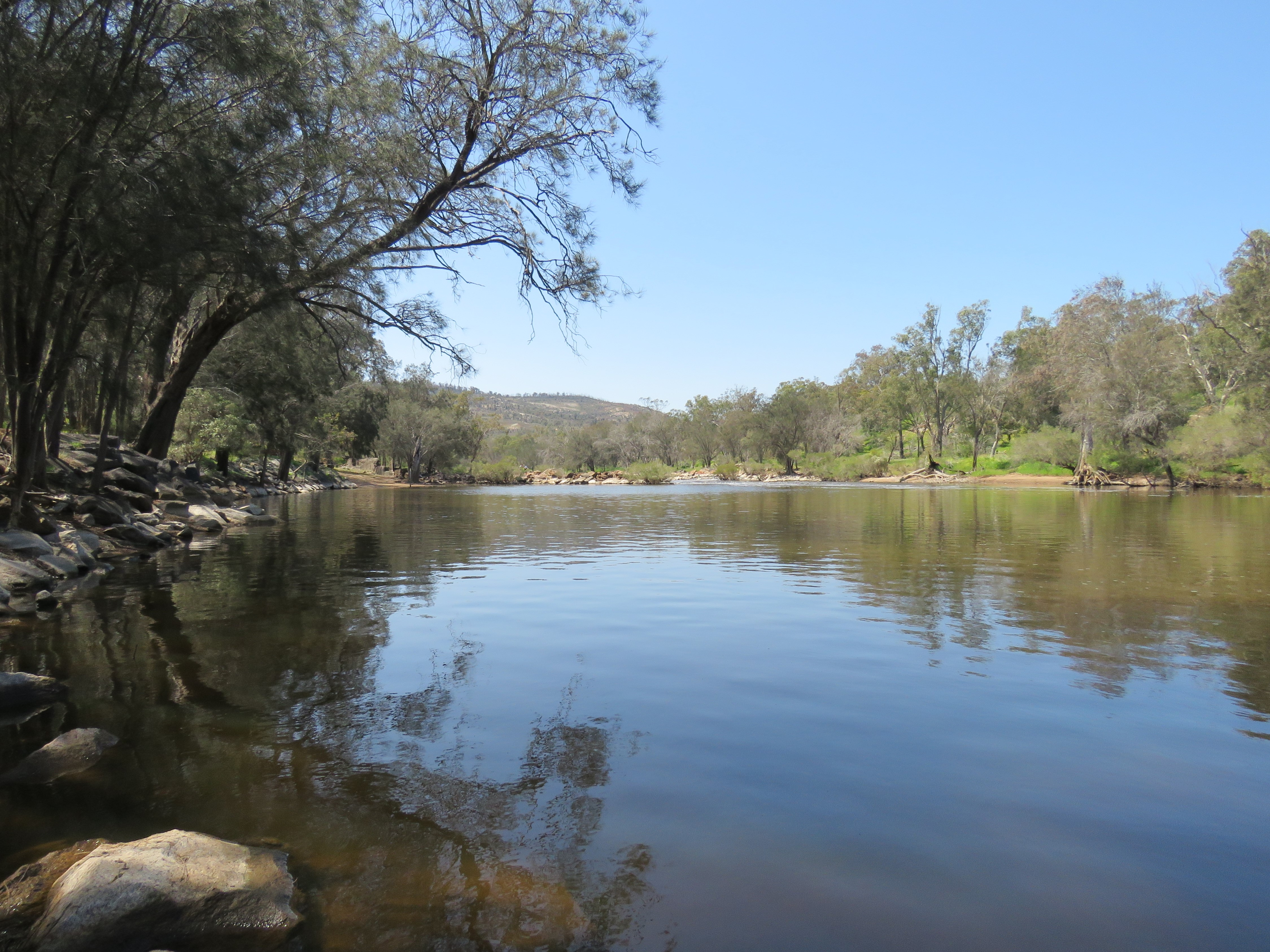
- Walyunga Pool, just downstream from where the Avon River becomes the Swan

- Location within Western Australia
- Location: Western Australia
- Nearest city: Perth, Western Australia
- Coordinates: 31°42′22″S 116°05′23″E
- Area: 1,814 ha (7.00 sq mi)
- Established: 1970
- Governing body: Department of Environment and Conservation
- Website: Official website

Walyunga National Park is a national park in Western Australia, 35 km northeast of Perth along the Great Northern Highway.

There is also an eponymous locality of the City of Swan, but the boundaries of the national park and the locality are not identical.

== Description ==
The park is situated just behind the Darling Scarp in the Darling Range spread over a steeply sided valley. The Swan-Avon River and the Eastern Railway run through the park and the Avon Descent passes through a set of rapids along this section. The area is dominated by granite outcrops along with smaller dolerite areas, the tops of hills are capped with laterite.

The park has barbeque, parking and toilet facilities. Also it is home to many animals such as grey kangaroo, galah, goanna, magpie, gecko and many other wildlife species. Plants include flooded gum, jarrah, petrophile and hakea. Walyunga is a 6000 year old meeting place used by the Noongar people. Currently it is an official protected area.

The word Walyunga roughly translates to "Happy Place".

== See also ==
- Protected areas of Western Australia
