= The Beverley Times =

Former newspaper in Western Australia

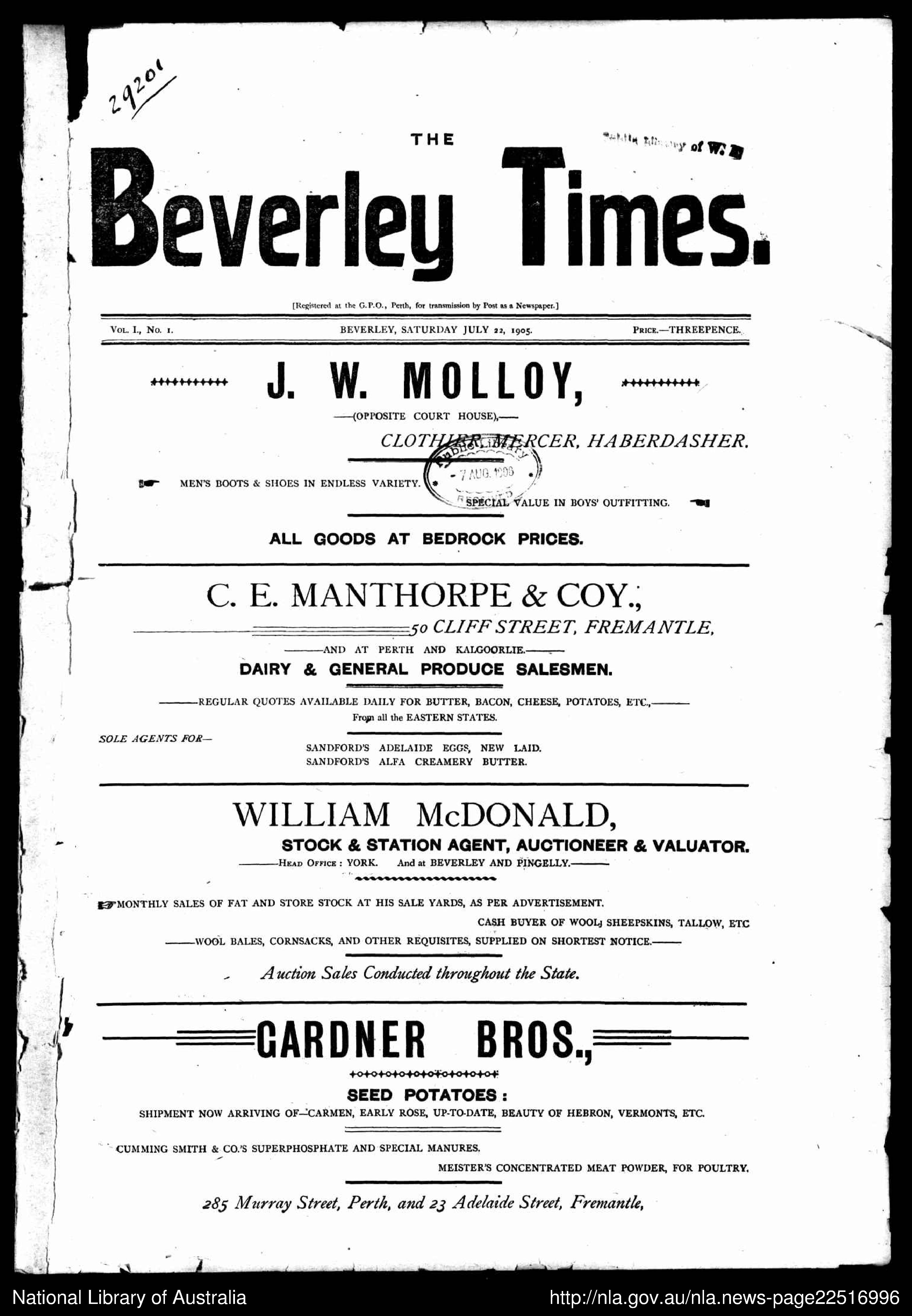
- The front page of the first published issue of The Beverley Times
- Founder(s): Chas Dawson, Henry Courtney
- Publisher: The Beverley Times Newspaper and General Printing Office
- Founded: 1905
- Ceased publication: 1977
- Political alignment: Independent
- Language: English
- City: Beverley
- Country: Australia

The Beverley Times is a defunct English language newspaper that was published weekly in the Wheatbelt town of Beverley, Western Australia, between 1905 and 1977.

== History ==
The Beverley Times first circulated on 22 July 1905 and was published by the manager Henry Courtney at The Beverley Times Newspaper and General Printing Office on Vincent Street, Beverley, for the proprietor Chas Dawson, Newcastle. Initially the newspaper shared its office space with the local Catholic Church who ran services in the front of the building, however in 1908 the building was sold to Athol Thomas who opened a news agency and continued to print The Beverley Times in the rear of the building.

The newspaper's creation was both a business venture and an effort to support the interests of the district of Beverley and provide residents with a forum for personal expression and discussion. News reported in The Beverley Times focused on the district of Beverley and included articles on agriculture and farming, broader topical issues, housing reports, sporting events, obituaries, advertisements and classifieds.

The newspaper was first published weekly on Saturdays until 28 February 1925 then weekly on Friday until 26 March 1970, then weekly on Thursday until 21 October 1976 and fortnightly on Thursdays until 4 November 1976. The Beverley Times contained the Avon Valley News-Express supplement between September 1962 and March 1964.

The Beverley Times was last published on 11 August 1977. That edition attributes the suspended to "illness of the editor", however the Shire of Beverley attributes its collapse to the inability of local businesses to compete with those in Perth, as a result of improvements in transport and communication links.

== Availability ==
Issues of this newspaper from 1905 to 1977 have been digitised as part of the Australian Newspapers Digitisation Program, a project of the National Library of Australia in cooperation with the State Library of Western Australia.

Hard copy and microfilm copies of this newspaper are also available at the State Library of Western Australia.

== See also ==
- List of newspapers in Australia
- List of newspapers in Western Australia
