= Black Swan Data =

London-based technology and data science company

- Company type: Private
- Industry: Technology; Marketing
- Founded: 2011
- Founders: Steve King (CEO); Hugo Amos (CMO)
- Headquarters: London, United Kingdom
- Area served: Global
- Services: Data science; Analytics
- Divisions: White Swan (charity division)
- Website: blackswan.com

Black Swan Data is a London-based technology and data science company that produces a social prediction SaaS platform called Trendscope. Trendscope uses predictive data science and proprietary Natural Language Processing to analyze Social data conversations that help businesses identify potential trends and customer behaviors. Its notable clients include PepsiCo, Unilever, McDonald's, Danone, Disney and numerous others. In 2016, the company raised a total of £9.2 million in two separate funding rounds led by investors like Mitsui, Albion Ventures, and The Blackstone Group. The company is headquartered in London and has offices in New York, Budapest, Szeged, Cape Town and Exeter.

== History ==
Black Swan Data was founded in London by Steve King (CEO) and Hugo Amos (CMO) in 2011. In 2012, the firm raised £2.5 million from The Blackstone Group. By 2014, the company counted Disney, Tesco, Panasonic Avionics, Samsung, Debenhams, Argos, and Vodafone among its clients. It maintained regional offices in Hong Kong and Los Angeles and opened a new office in Exeter, Devon. The company was also listed among The Sunday Times Tech Track Top 10 Ones to Watch.

By early 2015, the company had added offices in Budapest, Manchester, and New York. In late 2015, Black Swan Data had added several clients, including GlaxoSmithKline, Unilever, and Mars. The company was also listed first on the inaugural Sunday Times Sage Start-up Track 15 which identifies the fastest growing start-ups in Britain.

In March 2016, the company received £3 million in a funding round led by Mitsui and Albion Ventures. According to the company, the funding was procured to further develop its platform and expand the business into Japan and the United States. In July 2016, Black Swan Data raised an additional £6.2 million from an investor group that included Albion Ventures, The Blackstone Group, and Mitsui. This capital would again be designated for the development of the social prediction platform and further international expansion. Also in 2016, the company topped The Sunday Times SME Export Track 100.

As of 2020, Black Swan Data has over 160 employees, spread over six offices in four countries, and counts major brands in the food, beverages and personal care sectors in the UK, Europe, US, and Japan as clients for its Trendscope trend prediction platform.

== Products and services ==
Black Swan Data's primary business offering is their proprietary data analytics software platform called Trendscope. The platform ingests millions of real-time, publicly available conversations from various Social data sources, including social media information, blogs and news. Trendscope filters and cleans this data, then uses algorithms to predict and forecast information to help businesses make marketing and supply chain decisions.

In general, the data that Trendscope analyzes and the predictions it yields vary greatly depending on the client. For instance, for Disney's film Frozen, Black Swan Data analysts identified information from Rotten Tomatoes and IMDb, data about movies released prior to Frozen, and videos that people were watching on YouTube as predictors for the potential success of the film and any related merchandise (and their requisite supply chains). By contrast, Black Swan Data worked with PepsiCo to help them apply predictive technology to their business and keep up with health and lifestyle trends across food and beverages.
