= Dale River =

River in Western Australia

Dale
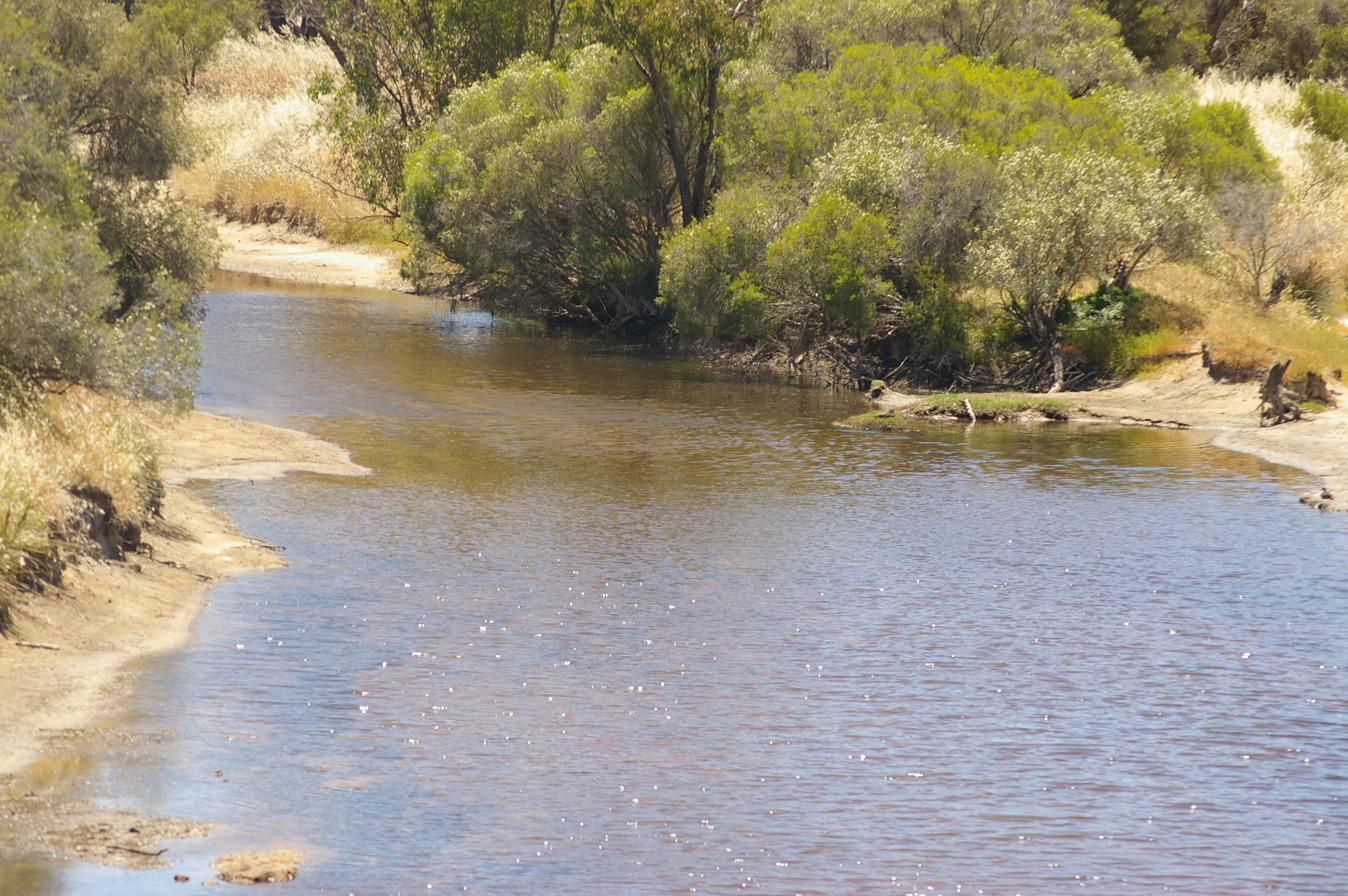
- Avondale Agricultural Research Station, Dale River
- Etymology: Robert Dale, an explorer

Location
- Country: Australia
- State: Western Austria
- Region: Wheatbelt

Physical characteristics
- Source: Darling Scarp
  - location: Boyagarring Conservation Reserve
  - coordinates: 32°18′56″S 116°25′27″E
  - elevation: 374 m (1,227 ft)
- Mouth: Avon River
  - location: west of Beverley
  - coordinates: 32°4′17″S 116°50′2″E
  - elevation: 189 m (620 ft)
- Length: 75 km (47 mi)

Basin features
- River system: Avon River

The Dale River is a perennial river located in the Wheatbelt region of Western Australia.

Rising on the eastern slopes of the Darling Scarp, the river flow generally east by north, joined by six major tributaries including the Dale River South, Gibb Gully, Connelly Gully, Sherlock Gully, Flint Gully and Talbot Brook. The river reaches its mouth to join the Avon River approximately 10 kilometres (6.2 mi) west of Beverley near the Avondale Agricultural Research Station. The river descends 185 metres (607 ft) over its 75-kilometre (47 mi) course.

The Dale River was named in honour of Robert Dale, the first European explorer to venture into the Darling Ranges in 1829.

The Dale River has been a historically useful waterway for the Wheatbelt regions surrounding towns and cities. The Dale River's mouth connects with the Avon River which is 240 km (150 mi) in length and a significant tributary from the river Dale. The Avon River in turn is a stream running from the Swan River being a significant waterway of the city of Perth. The Dale River is overall an important ecosystem of Western Australia housing native flora and fauna and additionally maintains the livelihood of surrounding towns and cities.

== History ==
=== Indigenous History ===
The Town of Beverley is the closest settlement of the Dale River. It has been home to the Ballardong people for thousands of years. The history of the Ballardong people has been marked through rock art around the region. The Ballardong people cultivated the land for food consisting of native foods.

The Noongar people are a large clan located along the South Coast of Western Australia and through the Wheatbelt region. They have been described as having a "sharing relationship" and lacking an intense "competition for resources".

The Noongar people initially clashed with the early European settlers of the Avon River region. In 1886 an Aboriginal Protection Act was introduced as a means to uphold indigenous rights to a degree within Western Australia.

=== Beverley ===
Beverley is a small town 130 km (81 mi) east of Perth, Western Australia. Beverley was founded in the year of 1838. It was deemed adequate for agricultural practices by English explorer Robert Dale who was the first European to explore the Darling Ranges of Western Australia and the individual who the Dale River was named after.

The town of Beverley has been deemed an important historical agricultural town of the Wheatbelt region. The town relies on the surrounding waterways of the Dale and Avon rivers as a means to support its agricultural practices and human inhabitance. 6 km (3.7 mi) west of Beverley is the Avondale Agricultural Museum which displays historical agricultural equipment and artefacts that portray the farming past of the Wheatbelt region that is located amongst the Dale and Avon rivers.

== See also ==
- List of watercourses in Western Australia
