= Mackie River =

River in Western Australia

Coordinates: 31°56′20″S 116°58′49″E

Location
- Country: Australia

Physical characteristics
- Source
  - location: near Corriging Hill
  - elevation: 336 metres (1,102 ft)
- Mouth
  - location: Avon River
  - elevation: 179 metres (587 ft)
- Length: 44 km (27 mi)
- Basin size: 327 km^{2} (126 sq mi)

The Mackie River is a river in the Wheatbelt region of Western Australia. The river is ephemeral and flows following winter and spring rains. The water discharged is saline.

The river rises east of Corriging Hill and flows in a north westerly direction crossing the York to Quairading road twice before it finally discharges into the Avon River of which it is a tributary between York and Gwambygine.

The Mackie has four tributaries of its own: Pitt Brook, Doctors Brook, Mungerding Brook and Bailey Bailey Brook. There were once permanent pools along the course of the river, most notably Marley Pool and Wonnobing Pool, but these are now shallow as a result of sediment deposition.

The area was first explored by Europeans in 1830 when Ensign Dale travelled east from Guildford. York was settled in 1831 and Beverley in 1838, the land around York was sub-divided in 1842 with the land being primarily used for agricultural purposes.

The river was named in 1836 by the Surveyor General John Septimus Roe, who named it after William Henry Mackie who was an early settler in the Swan River Colony.

== See also ==
- List of watercourses in Western Australia
