= Avon Descent =

White water event in Western Australia

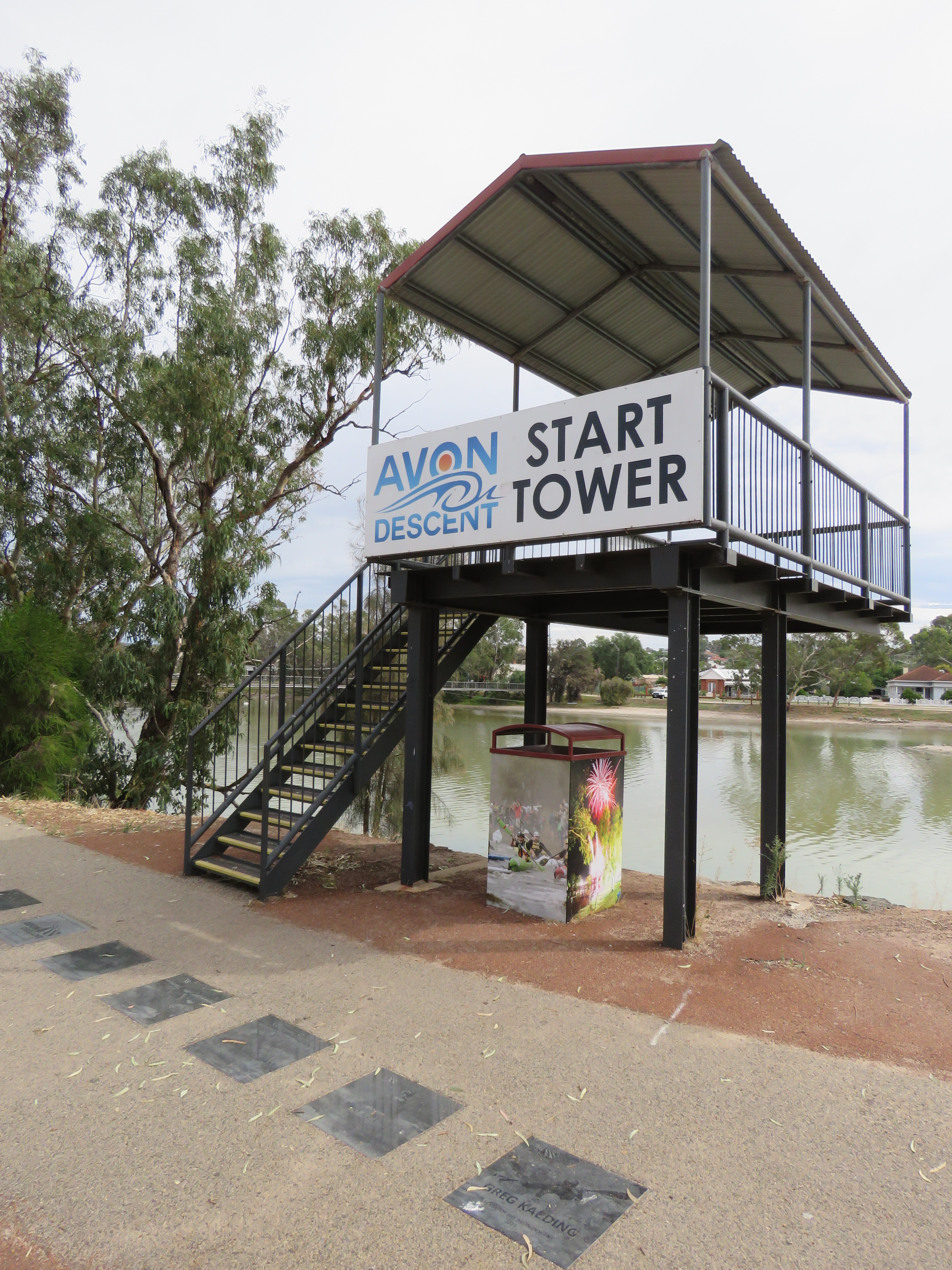
The Avon Descent start tower in Northam

The Avon Descent is an annual, two-day, white water event along the Avon and Swan Rivers in Western Australia. It includes both paddle craft (kayaks, surf skis) and small motor boats, and runs from Northam to the Perth suburb of Bayswater. It is held in August of every year. The first Avon Descent was held in 1973. The event was filmed by the second year. The descents are regularly photographed at each years event.

Sponsors and commercial support regularly changes, sometimes annually. Past sponsors include Coates Hire and Multiplex.

While it was still operating on main line track, the Hotham Valley Railway had special trains on the Avon Valley part of the Eastern railway to coincide with the race.

== Course ==
It is the only event in the world where both power craft and paddle craft compete. The course has Grade 2–4 white water rapids and is 124 kilometres (77 mi) long.

There also have been guides to canoeing the river – in general terms as to how to negotiate the river. The region map of the Avon valley first published in 1987 included a section relating to the event.

== Change and check points ==
The course has check points, teams changeover points, and powercraft fuel stops.

Check locations Northam – Day 1 start location

1. Katrine Bridge
2. Duidgee Park
3. Wetherall Reserve
4. Cobbler Pool – Day 1 finish location, Day 2 start location
5. Emu Falls
6. Stronghills Farm
7. Bells Rapid
8. Upper Swan bridge
9. Middle Swan Bridge

Riverside Gardens, Bayswater – Day 2 finish location

== Rapids ==
Named rapids identified in the outline map.

- Glen Avon rapid
- Toodyay rapid
- Leatherhead rapid
- Moondyne rapid
- Lookout rapids
- Championship rapid
- Syds rapid
- Walyunga rapid
- Bells rapid

== Prizes ==
There has been an increase in the prize pool from 2007 of A$10,000, equivalent to A$14,500 in 2022, providing an extra A$6,000 for first, A$3,000 for second and A$1,000 for third fastest single paddle craft. In 2006, 757 competitors started the event in 459 craft.

== Classes ==
The top class in the powerboats is the 10 hp (7.5 kW) sports class. These boats are made from foam and fibreglass, and have hydraulic jacks that enable the motor to be jacked up. The motors are unmodified and run a surface piercing propeller. These powerboats can reach speeds of approximately 70 km/h (43 mph).
