= Black Swan (dredge) =

Dredge scuttled outside Fremantle Harbour off the coast of Western Australia

External image
- Black Swan decorated for the Diamond Jubilee of Queen Victoria

The Black Swan was the first bucket dredge used by the Swan River Colony (now Western Australia) to make its rivers more suitable for shipping. The dredge was operational from 1872 to 1911, when it was scuttled. Initially known as the Government Dredge, it was renamed after being repaired and modified between 1887 and 1888. The dredging carried out by the Black Swan and other vessels had a significant impact on the river fauna and flora, including the black swans for which it was named.

== Design and construction ==
The need for dredging the Canning and Swan Rivers, particularly around Perth Water, had been identified as early as 1865. The shallow waters limited opportunities for trade, forcing cargo to be loaded and unloaded at the end of the Swan River, near Fremantle. In 1869 the government ordered a dredge from England, which arrived in segments at Fremantle in 1869 and was assembled in North Fremantle. The dredge was 90 feet (27 m) long, with a beam of 24 feet (7.3 m), and a 12-horsepower steam engine, that could be operated at up to 32 horsepower when assisted by a flywheel. There were 18 buckets attached to the bucket ladder, which was located in the centre of the vessel, and enabled dredging to a depth of approximately 9 feet (2.7 m).

By 1887, having been left unused for several years, the steel bottom of the vessel had rusted through in various locations. Repairs were made between 1887 and 1888. The bottom was replaced with jarrah, and at the same time the bucket ladder was modified. It was relocated to the bow, lengthened, and four extra buckets were added, which allowed the dredging depth to be increased to 15 feet (4.6 m).

== Operational history ==
Work began in 1872, using convict labour, on the dredging of a path between The Narrows and the William Street jetty, to allow the passage of cargo. This was extended up to Barrack Street, which was the site of King Cole's jetty. The dredge was also used around Fremantle several times, to remove sand banks and to assist boats travelling to the jetty at Pier Street. Following work on the Perth foreshore reclamation in the 1870s, which used silt from the channels dredged in Perth Water, the vessel was left sitting in the Perth foreshore for several years.

Following the repairs made in 1887 and 1888, the dredge was officially launched and renamed the Black Swan, on 19 June 1888. It took its name from the Swan River, which was named after the black swans living in the area. The first works done following this involved modifications to the mouth of the Swan River.

In 1892, the Black Swan was deployed to the Canning River, to cut a channel in the area known as Muddy Reach. Following this job, the dredge was taken back to the Perth Water, where it constructed a channel linking Barrack Street in Perth with Mends Street in South Perth, near the Perth Zoo. Following this, the Black Swan was used to dredge a channel between Barrack Street and Coode Street, and in 1900 widened the Barrack Street – Mends Street channel. For the next decade the dredge was used on reclamation projects in Perth.

== Decommissioning and legacy ==
In 1911, the reclamation works in Perth were completed. Subsequently, the equipment used on the project, including the Black Swan was taken out beyond Fremantle Harbour's North Mole and sunk.

Modifications made to the river, including the dredging of shallow Perth Waters, impacted the biodiversity of the Perth area. River shallows are important for fish breeding grounds, and provided food and shelter for the native black swans, after which the Swan River was named. Increasing the depth of the river put much of the swans' aquatic plant food supply out of reach, resulting in loss of habitat. In 2000, the state government released a plan to combat the decrease in black swan numbers due to dredging and other river modification, through habitat rehabilitation and recreation.
