= Mortlock River =

River in Wheatbelt region of Western Australia

Mortlock
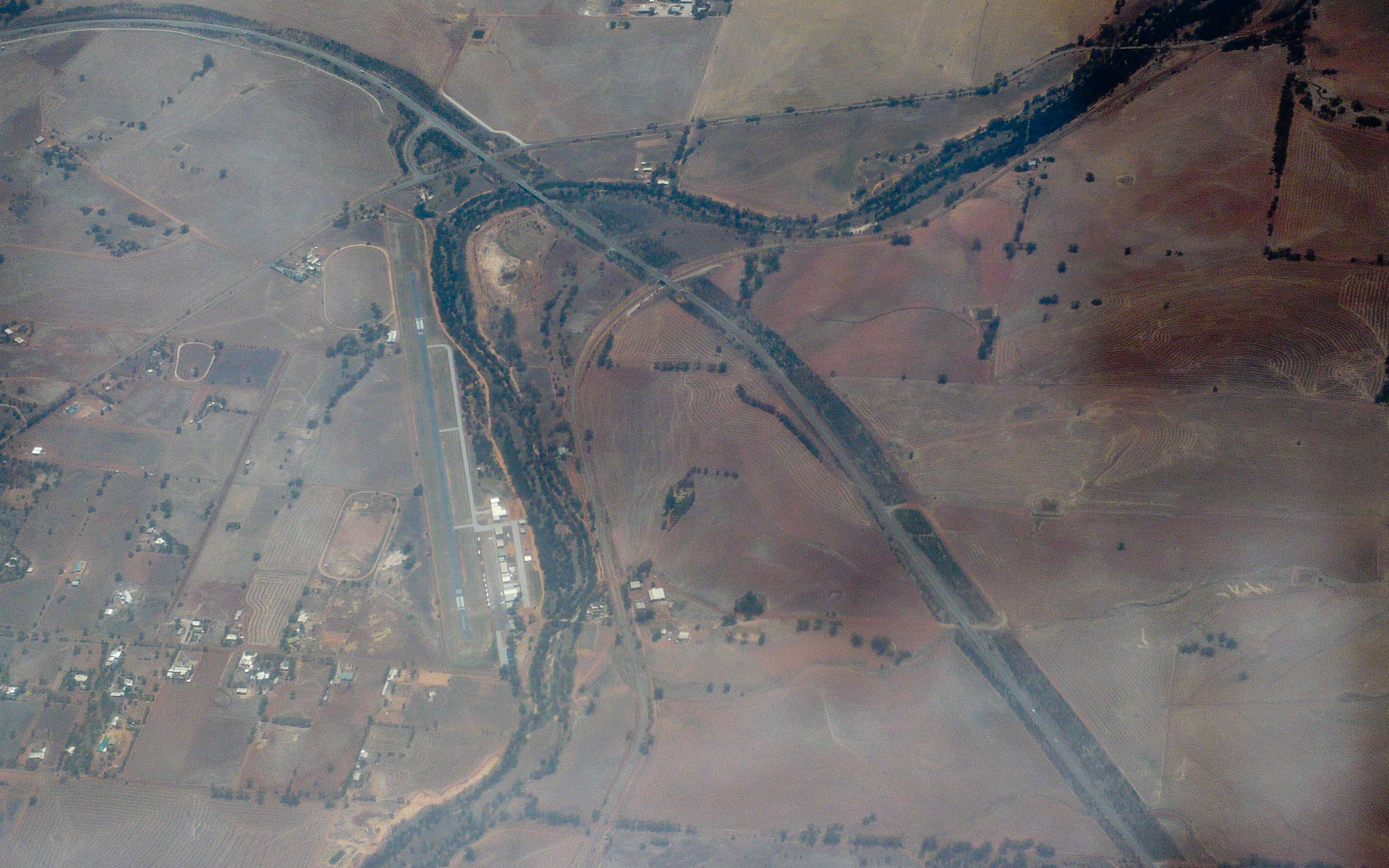
- Etymology: Henry Mortlock Ommanney, a surveyor

Location
- Country: Australia
- State: Western Australia
- Region: Wheatbelt

Physical characteristics
- Source
  - location: near Belmunging
  - coordinates: 31°51′48″S 117°9′2″E
  - elevation: 249 m (817 ft)
- Mouth: Avon River
  - location: west of Northam
  - coordinates: 31°38′41″S 116°40′20″E
  - elevation: 146 m (479 ft)
- Length: 81 km (50 mi)
- Basin size: 16,800 km^{2} (6,500 sq mi)
- Discharge
  - location: mouth
  - average: 17,800,000 m^{3}/s (630,000,000 cu ft/s)

Basin features
- River system: Avon River

The Mortlock River is a perennial river in the Wheatbelt region of Western Australia.

== Course and features ==
The headwaters of the river rise near Belmunging then flow in a northerly direction, crossed by the Goldfields Road and continuing in a north-westerly direction to finally flow parallel to the Northam York Road and crossed by the Great Eastern Highway. The river is joined by three minor tributaries: Mortlock River North, Mortlock River East and Meenaar South Creek. The river discharges into the Avon River, just west of Northam. The Mortlock descends 103 metres (338 ft) over its 81-kilometre (50 mi) course.

The river is saline and delivers the most salt, approximately 91 tonnes (200 thousand pounds) per year, into the Avon River.

== Name ==
The river was named after the surveyor Henry Mortlock Ommanney in the 1830s. Ommanney visited the river during an expedition through the area in 1835.

== See also ==
- List of watercourses in Western Australia
