= List of museums in Western Australia =

This list of museums in Western Australia contains museums which are defined for this context as institutions (including nonprofit organizations, government entities, and private businesses) that collect and care for objects of cultural, artistic, scientific, or historical interest and make their collections or related exhibits available for public viewing. Also included are non-profit art galleries and university art galleries.

Name	Location	Region	Type	Links
Albany Convict Gaol Museum	Albany	Great Southern	Prison	Albany Historical Society
Albany Co-operative Store	Albany	Great Southern	Local history	Albany Historical Society website
The Brig Amity	Albany	Great Southern	Maritime	Operated by the Museum of the Great Southern, replica early 19th century two-masted brig museum ship
Argyle Downs Homestead Museum	Kununurra	Kimberley	Historic house	website, also known as the Duracks Museum, 1880s pioneer homestead
Army Museum of Western Australia	Fremantle	Greater Perth	Military	Collections housed in an historic artillery barracks
Art Gallery of Western Australia	Perth	Greater Perth	Art	Part of the Perth Cultural Centre
ArtGeo	Busselton	South West	Art	website, municipal art gallery
Augusta Historical Museum	Augusta	South West	Local history	information
Australia Inland Mission Hospital Museum	Lake Grace	Wheatbelt	Medical	information, former hospital of the Australian Inland Mission
Australian Sailing Museum	Mandurah	Peel	Maritime	Includes yacht models, history of Australian sailing, sailors from the 19th century, maritime art
Aviation Heritage Museum	Perth	Greater Perth	Aviation	Created and maintained by the Air Force Association WA Ltd, military and civilian aircraft, aircraft replicas and aircraft engines
Avondale Discovery Farm	Beverley	Wheatbelt	Farm	Research farm with historical buildings and a farming equipment museum, operated by the National Trust of Australia
Azelia Ley Homestead Museum	Hamilton Hill	Greater Perth	Local history	website
Bailup Ford Farm	Bailup	Greater Perth	Automotive	information, open by appointment
Bellview Shell Collection	Witchcliffe	South West	Natural history	information, shells and coral
Belmont Museum	Belmont	Greater Perth	Local history	website
Berkshire Valley Folk Museum	Moora	Wheatbelt	Open air	information
Berndt Museum of Anthropology	Crawley	Greater Perth	Anthropology	Aboriginal art and culture, artefacts from Melanesia, Asia and Southeast Asia, part of the University of Western Australia
Beverley Aeronautical Museum	Beverley	Wheatbelt	Aerospace	information, tribute to the aviators of Western Australia
Boyup Brook Pioneers Museum	Boyup Brook	South West	Local history	information
Broome Museum	Broome	Kimberley	Local history	website, operated by the Broome Historical Society
Bridgedale	Bridgetown	South West	Historic house	website, operated by the National Trust of Australia
Bridgetown Old Gaol	Bridgetown	South West	Prison	website, operated by the Bridgetown Historical Society
Bruce Rock Museum	Bruce Rock	Wheatbelt	Local history	information
Busselton Jetty Interpretive Centre	Busselton	South West	Maritime	History of the jetty
Bunbury Museum and Heritage Centre	Bunbury	South West	Local history	website, operated by the City of Bunbury
Bus Preservation Society of Western Australia	Whiteman Park	Greater Perth	Local history	website, Western Australia's bus history
Busselton Museum	Busselton	South West	Local history	website
Cape Leeuwin Lighthouse	Cape Leeuwin	South West	Maritime	Lighthouse tours offered daily
Cape Naturaliste Lighthouse	Cape Naturaliste	South West	Maritime	Lighthouse tours and area maritime history
Carnamah Museum	Carnamah	Mid West	Local history	Operated by the Carnamah Historical Society
Carnarvon Space and Technology Museum	Carnarvon	Gascoyne	Science	History of the OTC Satellite Earth Station Carnarvon used for communications for NASA's Apollo Moon project
Central Greenough Historic Settlement	Greenough	Mid West	Open air	Operated by the National Trust of Australia, mid 19th century agriculture town
Chapman Valley Museum	Nanson	Mid West	Local history	website, operated by the Chapman Valley Historical Society
Chiverton House Museum	Northampton	Mid West	Local history	information, operated by the Northampton Historical Society, includes mining, agriculture, machinery and social history
City of Gosnells Museum – Wilkinson Homestead	Gosnells	Greater Perth	Local history	website, early 20th century homestead with farm buildings including machinery shed, dunny and washhouse, agriculture machines
Claremont Museum	Claremont	Greater Perth	Local history	website
Coalfields Museum	Collie	South West	Local history	website
Cola Café and Museum	Toodyay	Wheatbelt	Beverage	website, 1950s style café with collection of Coca-Cola memorabilia
Connor's Mill	Toodyay	Wheatbelt	Mill	Historic flour mill
Corrigin Pioneer Museum	Corrigin	Wheatbelt	Local history	information
Cullity Gallery	Nedlands	Greater Perth	Art	website, part of the University of Western Australia
Cunderdin Municipal Museum	Cunderdin	Wheatbelt	Local history	information
Dardanup Heritage Park	Dardanup	South West	Technology	website, working agricultural and industrial machinery including a steam sawmill, engines, tractors, bulldozers, horse-drawn equipment, military memorabilia and more
Dead Finish Museum	Beverley	Wheatbelt	Local history	information, operated by the Beverley Historical Society
Denmark Historical Museum	Denmark	Great Southern	Local history	information
Department of Fire and Emergency Services Education and Heritage Centre	Perth	Greater Perth	Firefighting	History of Western Australian fire services
Dinosaur World	Denmark	Great Southern	Natural history	website, dinosaur skeletons, live birds and reptiles
Don Rhodes Mining and Transport Museum	Port Hedland	Pilbara	Mining and railway	Public park with an open-air display of retired mining machinery and railway rolling stock
Dowerin District Museum	Dowerin	Wheatbelt	Local history	information
Edward de Courcy Clarke Earth Science Museum	Crawley	Greater Perth	Natural history	website, minerals, rocks, fossils and meteorite, part of the University of Western Australia
Ellensbrook	Yebble	South West	Historic house	website, operated by the National Trust of Australia
Esperance Museum	Esperance	Goldfields-Esperance	Local history	information website
Fremantle Arts Centre	Fremantle	Greater Perth	Art	website
Fremantle Prison	Fremantle	Greater Perth	Prison	Mid 19th century prison including gatehouse, perimeter walls, cottages, tunnels and prisoner art
Friends of Donnelly Village Museum	Donnelly River Village	SW Western Australia	Heritage listed Timber Mill Village	website, mid 20th century industrial site and adjoining workers village. Museum in Old School.
Goldfields War Museum	Kalgoorlie-Boulder	Goldfields-Esperance	Military	information
Goomalling Museum	Goomalling	Wheatbelt	Local history	website
Grain Discovery Centre	Narembeen	Wheatbelt	Agriculture	website, area wheat and grain industry
Gravity Discovery Centre	Gingin	Wheatbelt	Science	Hands-on science education centre operated by the University of Western Australia, focus on physics and astronomy
Gwalia Historical Museum	Gwalia	Goldfields-Esperance	Local history	website
Greenbushes Eco Cultural Discovery Centre	Greenbushes	South West	Multiple	website, area's natural history, environment, industry and heritage
Gwoonwardu Mia – Gascoyne Aboriginal Heritage and Cultural Centre	Carnarvon	Gascoyne	Art	website, Aboriginal culture and art
Halliday House	Bayswater	Greater Perth	Local history	website, operated by the Bayswater Historical Society
Heathcote Museum and Gallery	Applecross	Greater Perth	Local history	website, history of the former mental health hospital, local history and culture, art
History House Museum	Armadale	Greater Perth	Local history	website
House of Buick	Bedfordale	Greater Perth	Automotive	information, open by appointment
Hugh Manning Tractor & Machinery Museum	Serpentine	Greater Perth	Agriculture	information
Hyden Pioneer Town	Hyden	Wheatbelt	Local history	information
Irwin District Museum	Dongara	Mid West	Local history	website, operated by the Irwin District Historical Society
Jarrahdale Old Post Office Museum	Jarrahdale	Darling Range	Local history	website
John Curtin Gallery	Bentley	Greater Perth	Art	website, part of Curtin University
Kalamunda History Village	Kalamunda	Darling Range	Open air	website, operated by the Kalamunda and Districts Historical Society, features over a dozen restored heritage buildings
Kalgoorlie Boulder Racing Club Museum	Kalgoorlie-Boulder	Goldfields-Esperance	Sports	website, horse racing memorabilia
King Cottage Museum	Bunbury	South West	Local history	information, operated by the Bunbury Historical Society
Koorda and Districts Museum	Koorda	Wheatbelt	Medical	information, former hospital
Kununurra Museum	Kununurra	Kimberley	Local history	website, operated by the Kununurra Historical Society
Lace Place	Hyden	Wheatbelt	Textile	information, hand-made and machined lace, antique gowns
Lawrence Wilson Art Gallery	Crawley	Greater Perth	Art	website, part of the University of Western Australia
Lighthouse Keeper's Cottage	Bluff Point	Mid West	Local history	information, operated by the Geraldton-Greenough Historical Society
Mandurah Community Museum	Mandurah	Peel	Local history	website
Mangowine Homestead	Nungarin	Wheatbelt	Historic house	website, operated by the National Trust of Australia
Manjimup Timber Park	Manjimup	South West	Forestry	website, state's timber industry
Melville Discovery Centre	Booragoon	Greater Perth	Local history	website, social history and culture
Merredin Military Museum	Merredin	Wheatbelt	Military	information
Merredin Railway Museum	Merredin	Wheatbelt	Railway	information, information, operated by the Merredin Historical Society
Miller Bakehouse Museum	Melville	Greater Perth	Industry	website, operated by the Melville Historical Society, 19th century wood-fired bakehouse
Motor Museum of Western Australia	Whiteman Park	Greater Perth	Automotive	website, cars, motorcycles, memorabilia
Mount Flora Regional Museum	Watermans Bay	Greater Perth	Local history	website
Mowanjum Art and Culture Centre	Derby	Kimberley	Art	website, Mowanjum Community art and culture
Mundaring Travelling Museum	Mundaring	Darling Range	Local history	Operated by Lost Mundaring & Surroundings Local History Museum. Features temporary and permanent exhibitions telling the story of people, place and events in the Shire of Mundaring.
Mundaring District Museum	Mundaring	Darling Range	Local history	Operated by the Mundaring and Hills Historical Society
Museum of Fishing & The Sea - The Packout Room	Port Denison	Midwest Region	Crayfishing and Natural History of the Irwin Coast	website 2 McIntyre Cove, Port Denison. Operated by Irwin Districts Historical Society.
Museum of Performing Arts	Perth	Greater Perth	Performing arts	Located in His Majesty's Theatre, memorabilia including costumes, photographs, press clippings, scripts, scores and other historic pieces
Museum of Natural History, Academy of Taxidermy	Guildford	Greater Perth	Natural history	website, stuffed animal mounts
Museum of Perth	Perth	Greater Perth	Local history	website, operated by Perth History Association Inc
Narembeen Museums	Narembeen	Wheatbelt	Local history	information, includes the St Paul's Museum, History Museum and History and Machinery Museum
New Norcia Museum	New Norcia	Wheatbelt	Religious	website, history of the Aboriginal mission and an art gallery
Newcastle Gaol Museum	Toodyay	Wheatbelt	Prison	Also known as Newcastle Gaol Museum, includes courtroom, prison cells and police stables
No 1 Pump Station	Mundaring	Darling Range	Technology	website, operated by the National Trust of Australia, steam pump station for water for the Goldfields Water Supply Scheme
Northampton Motors & Machinery Shed	Northampton	Mid West	Technology	information, motors, trucks and tractors
Northcliffe Pioneer Museum	Northcliffe	South West	Local history	website, local industry, domestic life and work on the dairy farms, aboriginal tools, fossils, rocks, minerals, machinery
The Nostalgia Box	Perth	Greater Perth	Technology	website, video game consoles
Nungarin Heritage Machinery and Army Museum	Nungarin	Wheatbelt	Multiple	website, area pioneer and army heritage including Army vehicles, uniforms and equipment, agricultural machinery, memorabilia, dolls, toys
Old Blythewood	Pinjarra	Peel	Historic house	website, operated by the National Trust of Australia
Old Court House Law Museum	Perth	Greater Perth	Law	Operated by the Law Society of Western Australia, history of the law, legal issues and the legal profession in Western Australia
Old Farm, Strawberry Hill	Albany	Great Southern	Historic house	website, operated by the National Trust of Australia
Old Mill, Perth	Perth	Greater Perth	Mill	Restored tower windmill
Old Railway Station Museum	Northam	Wheatbelt	Local history	information
Old Roebourne Gaol	Roebourne	Pilbara	Local history	information
HMAS Ovens	Fremantle	Greater Perth	Maritime	Part of the Western Australian Museum, Oberon class submarine museum ship
Patrick Taylor Cottage Museum	Albany	Great Southern	Historic house	website, operated by the Albany Historical Society, 1830s wattle and daub home, oldest surviving dwelling in Western Australia
Peninsula Farm	Maylands	Greater Perth	Historic house	Mid-19th-century farmer's cottage, operated by the National Trust of Australia
Perth Gaol	Perth	Greater Perth	Prison	Part of the Western Australian Museum
Perth Institute of Contemporary Arts	Perth	Greater Perth	Art	Contemporary art
Perth Mint	Perth	Greater Perth	Numismatic	Tours of the mint, coins
Piney Lakes Environmental Education Centre	Booragoon	Greater Perth	Environment	website, the environment, sustainable living
Pinnacles Desert Discovery Centre	Cervantes	Wheatbelt	Natural history	Geology, plants, animals, cultural heritage of the Pinnacles Desert
Princess Royal Fortress	Albany	Great Southern	Military	website, historic fort with restored shore batteries, armouries, barracks, the 10th Light Horse display, collection of naval guns and torpedoes
Residency Museum (York)	York	Wheatbelt	Local history	website, operated by the Shire of York
Revolutions Transport Museum	Whiteman Park	Greater Perth	Transportation	information, land transportation including horse-drawn vehicles
Ridley's Motor Museum	Bertram	Greater Perth	Automotive	information
Rockingham Historical Society Museum	Rockingham	Greater Perth	Local history	information
Rottnest Island Museum	Rottnest Island	Greater Perth	Local history	information
Round House	Fremantle	Greater Perth	Prison	Oldest building still standing in Western Australia
Royal Western Australian Historical Society Museum	Nedlands, Western Australia	Perth	Statewide	website, large collection of photographs and memorabilia of Perth and Western Australia.
Russ Cottage	Dongara	Mid West	Historic house	website, operated by the Irwin District Historical Society
Scitech	Perth	Greater Perth	Science	Interactive exhibits about science, technology, engineering and maths
Shark Bay World Heritage Discovery Centre	Denham	Gascoyne	Multiple	Natural history, maritime and cultural heritage of Shark Bay, a World Heritage Site
Slater Homestead	Goomalling	Wheatbelt	Historic house	website
Southern Cross & Yilgarn Districts Historical Museum	Southern Cross	Wheatbelt	Local history	information
South West Rail and Heritage Centre	Boyanup	South West	Railway	website, operated by Rail Heritage WA
Sisters of St John of God Heritage Center	Broome	Kimberley	Religious	website, social history related to the Sisters of St John of God and Aboriginal people of the Kimberley
Subiaco Museum	Subiaco	Greater Perth	Local history	
Swan Guildford Historical Society	Guildford	Greater Perth	History Museum	website, Colonial Gaol, Taylor's Cottage, social history of Guildford and the Swan Valley
Technology Museum of WA Incorporated	Victoria Park	Greater Perth	Technology Museum	website, Various Technologies, PC's, cameras and video equipment
The Big Camera Museum of Photography	Meckering	Greater Perth	Camera Museum	website, Vintage Cameras and Accessories
Tractor Museum of Western Australia	Whiteman Park	Greater Perth	Transportation	website, vintage tractors, trucks and stationary engines, replica settlers cottage
Vickers Holden Museum	Furnissdale	Peel	Automotive	information, Holden cars, open by appointment
WACA Museum	Perth	Greater Perth	Sports	Operated by the Western Australian Cricket Association, history of cricket and other sports played at WACA Ground
Wagin Historical Village	Wagin	Great Southern	Open air	website, Saving Technology for Future Generations
Wanneroo Museum	Wanneroo	Greater Perth	Local history	website
Warden Finnerty's Residence	Coolgardie	Goldfields-Esperance	Historic house	website, operated by the National Trust of Australia
Warmun Art Centre	Kununurra	Kimberley	Art	website
West Coast Motor Museum	Mandurah	Peel	Automotive	website, over 50 vehicles from 1915 on
Western Australia Medical Museum	Subiaco	Greater Perth	Medical	information
Museum of the Great Southern	Albany	Great Southern	Local history	website, Natural and social history of the region
Museum of Geraldton	Geraldton	Mid West	Local history	website, Heritage of the land, sea and people of the Mid West region
Museum of the Goldfields	Kalgoorlie-Boulder	Goldfields-Esperance	Mining	website, History of the Eastern Goldfields and the city's mining heritage
Western Australian Museum	Perth	Greater Perth	Natural history	website, Culture of the local Aboriginal people, State's natural history, geology – Closed until 2020
WA Shipwrecks Museum	Fremantle	Greater Perth	Maritime	website, Features relics from ships wrecked along Western Australia's coastline
WA Maritime Museum	Fremantle	Greater Perth	Maritime	website, Includes HMAS Ovens submarine, boats, fishing, cargoes, naval defence, steam machines
Western Australian Rail Transport Museum	Bassendean	Greater Perth	Railway	Heritage steam locomotives and rolling stock
Whale World	Albany	Great Southern	Natural history	website, whales and whale industry history, located in a former whaling station
Wireless Hill Museum	Ardross	Greater Perth	Telecommunications	Historic radio station
Wongan Hills and District Museum	Wongan Hills	Wheatbelt	Local history	information
Wonnerup House	Wonnerup	South West	Historic house	Mid-19th-century house, includes historic school and teacher's house, operated by the National Trust of Australia
Woodbridge House	Woodbridge	Greater Perth	Historic house	website, operated by the National Trust of Australia, late 19th-century mansion
Woodloes Homestead	Cannington	Greater Perth	Historic house	Mid-19th-century house, designed and build by Francis Bird, operated by Canning Districts Historical Society
Wubin Wheatbin Museum	Wubin	Wheatbelt	Agriculture	information, wheat farming
Wyalkatchem CBH Agricultural Museum	Wyalkatchem	Wheatbelt	Agriculture	information, agricultural, transport exhibits
Yarloop Workshops	Yarloop	Wheatbelt	Railway	Historic railway workshops with working steam engines, used for forestry industry trains
York Courthouse Complex	York	Wheatbelt	Prison	website, operated by the National Trust of Australia, includes courthouse, cell block and police station
York Motor Museum	York	Wheatbelt	Automotive	website, vintage and classic motor vehicles

== Defunct museums ==
- Museum of Western Australia Sports

== See also ==
- List of museums in Australia
