= List of State Register of Heritage Places in the City of Melville =

The State Register of Heritage Places is maintained by the Heritage Council of Western Australia. As of 2026, 173 places are heritage-listed in the City of Melville, of which 25 are on the State Register of Heritage Places.

== List ==
The Western Australian State Register of Heritage Places, as of 2026, lists the following 25 state registered places within the City of Melville:

Place name	Place #	Location	Suburb or town	Co-ordinates	Built	State registered	Notes	Photo
Applecross District Hall	1543	69 Canning Beach Road	Applecross	32°00′40″S 115°51′03″E	1934	5 November 1999	Also referred to as Tivoli Theatre; Part of Raffles Hotel Precinct (3926); Single-storey community hall with tower, in the Inter-War Art Deco style	
Applecross Primary School (original buildings)	1542	65 Kintail Road	Applecross	32°00′40″S 115°50′20″E	1913	15 December 1995	Example of a one-teacher school room from the beginning of the twentieth century	
Applecross Primary School - Bell Tower	17792	65 Kintail Road	Applecross	32°00′40″S 115°50′20″E	1929		Also referred to as Centenary Bell Tower; Part of Applecross Primary School (original buildings) Precinct (1542)	
Applecross Primary School - Pavilion	17794	65 Kintail Road	Applecross	32°00′40″S 115°50′20″E	1919		Part of Applecross Primary School (original buildings) Precinct (1542)	
Applecross Primary School - School House	17793	65 Kintail Road	Applecross	32°00′40″S 115°50′20″E	1945		Part of Applecross Primary School (original buildings) Precinct (1542)	
Canning Bridge	16178	Canning Highway	Applecross & Como	32°00′40″S 115°51′12″E	1958	2 March 2012	Two almost identical timber bridges, Eastbound Downstream (Ref 913, build 1937) and Westbound Upstream (Ref 912, build 1958); This entry and the following are also listed under the City of South Perth as the bridge links the Cities of Melville and South Perth	
Canning Bridge Eastbound Downstream	4659	Canning Highway	Applecross & Como	32°00′40″S 115°51′12″E	1937		Part of Canning Bridge Precinct (16178)	
Grasmere	1546	9 Spinaway Crescent	Brentwood	32°02′43″S 115°51′29″E	1886	14 May 2002	Also referred to as Bateman Homestead; Single storey homestead in the Victorian-Georgian style	
Heathcote Hospital	3289	Duncraig Road, Point Heathcote	Applecross	32°00′13″S 115°50′33″E	1929	25 June 1993	Also referred to as Point Heathcote Reception Home; Group of civic buildings, representative of the design and materials used for public buildings produced in Western Australia in the period of the mid to late 1920s	
Millers' Bakehouse Museum	1548	3 Baal Street	Palmyra	32°02′23″S 115°47′15″E	1935	27 August 1999	Rare example of a small residential bakery	
Raffles Hotel	1544	70 Canning Beach Road	Applecross	32°00′39″S 115°51′06″E	1896	22 January 2002	Also referred to as Canning Bridge Hotel; One of the last remaining hotels representing the Inter-War Functionalist style in the Perth metropolitan area	
Wireless Hill Park	3518	Canning Highway	Ardross	32°01′50″S 115°49′40″E	1912	2 September 1997	Working radio communications station, continuously used between 1912 and 1967, one of only five such facilities in Australia	
Wireless Hill Park - Caretakers Residence	3824	Canning Highway	Ardross	32°01′50″S 115°49′40″E	1912		Also referred to as Operators Building; Part of Wireless Hill Park Precinct (3518)	
Wireless Hill Park - Engine House	3825	Canning Highway	Ardross	32°01′50″S 115°49′40″E	1912		Part of Wireless Hill Park Precinct (3518)	
Wireless Hill Park Museum Group	3823	Canning Highway	Ardross	32°01′50″S 115°49′40″E	1912		Also referred to as Telecommunication Station; Part of Wireless Hill Park Precinct (3518)	
Wireless Hill Park - Store	3826	Canning Highway	Ardross	32°01′50″S 115°49′40″E	1912		Also referred to as SES Post and Boardroom; Part of Wireless Hill Park Precinct (3518)	
Wireless Hill Park - Village	3828	Canning Highway	Ardross	32°01′50″S 115°49′40″E	1912		Part of Wireless Hill Park Precinct (3518)	
Wireless Masts	3827	Canning Highway	Ardross	32°01′49″S 115°49′39″E	1912		Also referred to as Lookout Tower	
Wireless Hill Park - Manager's House	6065	2 Hickey Street	Ardross	32°01′36″S 115°49′42″E	1912		Part of Wireless Hill Park Precinct (3518)	
Wireless Hill Park Technicians House	6064	4 Hickey Street	Ardross	32°01′37″S 115°49′42″E	1912		Part of Wireless Hill Park Precinct (3518)	
Wireless Hill Park - Operators Accommodation "The Barracks"	6063	6 Hickey Street	Ardross	32°01′37″S 115°49′42″E	1912		Part of Wireless Hill Park Precinct (3518)	
Wireless Hill Park - Dwelling - Senior Telegraphist's Residence	6062	8 Hickey Street	Ardross	32°01′38″S 115°49′41″E	1912		Part of Wireless Hill Park Precinct (3518)	
Mount Henry Bridge	4794	Kwinana Freeway over the Canning River	Salter Point and Mount Pleasant	32.033889°S 115.858333°E	1982, 2006			
Wireless Hill Park - Heritage Trails	17795	Wireless Hill	Ardross	32°01′37″S 115°49′42″E	1969		Part of Wireless Hill Park Precinct (3518)	
Wireless Hill Park - Moreton Bay Fig Tree	17796		Ardross	32°01′50″S 115°49′40″E			Part of Wireless Hill Park Precinct (3518)	
