= Commissariat Buildings =

Buildings in the West End of Fremantle, Western Australia

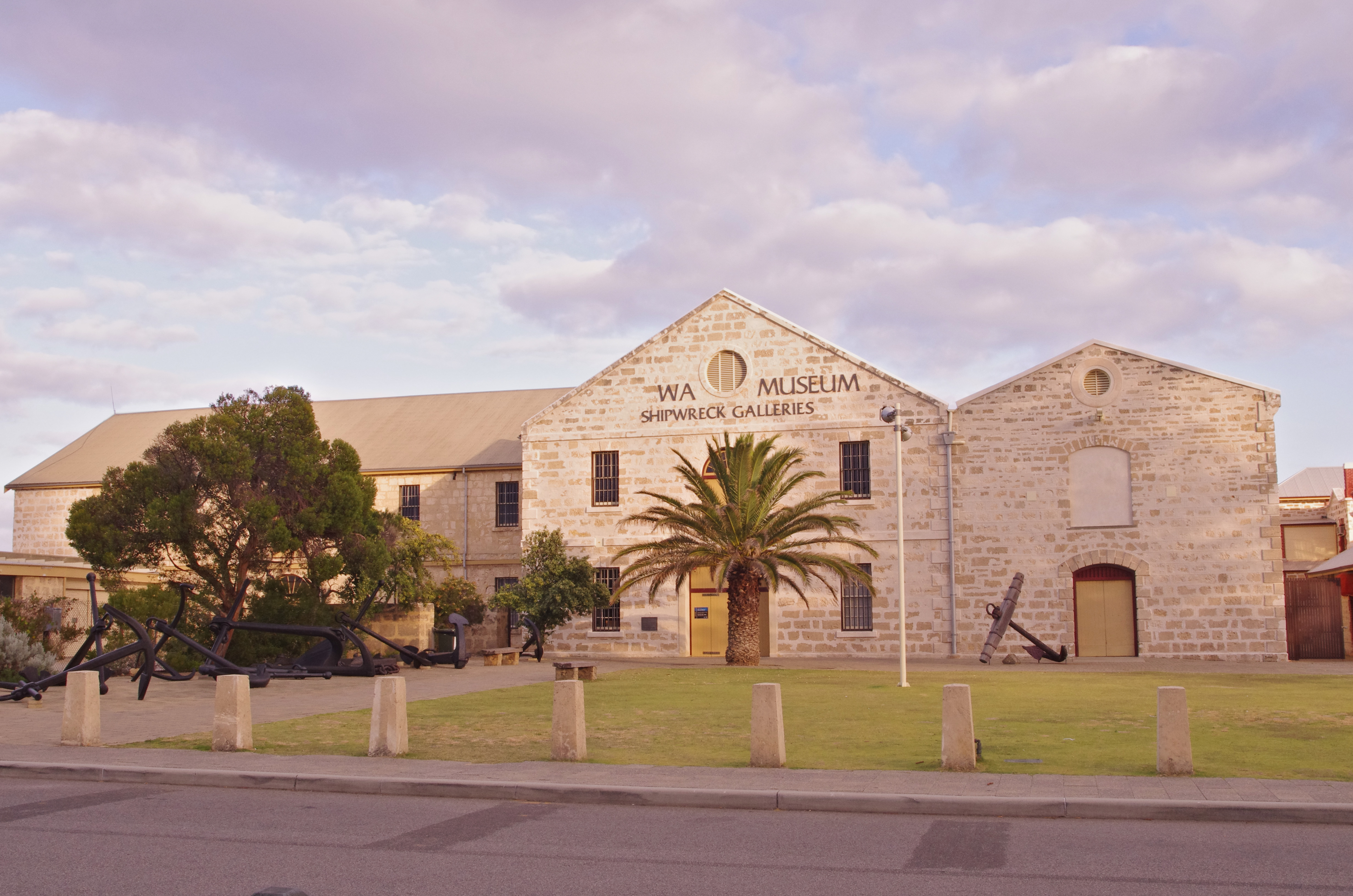
- The south façade of the Commissariat buildings as viewed from opposite Marine Terrace in 2013
- Interactive map of the Commissariat Buildings area

General information
- Type: Museum
- Location: Fremantle, Western Australia
- Coordinates: 32.056906°S 115.742579°E

Western Australia Heritage Register
- Type: State Registered Place
- Designated: 22 June 2001
- Part of: West End, Fremantle (25225)
- Reference no.: 857

The Commissariat Buildings are a group of two buildings found at 6 Marine Terrace in the west end of Fremantle, Western Australia, which, with construction having begun in 1852, are one of the first sites built using convict labour in the Swan River colony.

Throughout their time in use, they have been used in various capacities by several governmental organisations, until 1979 when they began to hold the Western Australian Maritime Museum's shipwreck galleries, which they continue to do to date.

== Background ==
Before the construction of the Commissariat Buildings, all materials bound for the convict establishment were either unloaded to be stored in the temporary prison in Fremantle, or taken upstream to a Perth warehouse. The Commissariat Buildings were constructed to increase the efficiency.

== History ==
=== Early history ===
The buildings were designed by the clerk of works James Manning and were constructed in several stages over a period of 50 years, beginning in 1852, under the supervision of Captain Edmund Henderson, Royal Engineer and Comptroller General of Convicts in Western Australia. Originally built to serve a commissariat function, storing the food, clothing and building supplies of the colony, construction issues arose when it was used for storage before a roof had been built due to a number of delays. These delays were extensive enough to warrant the planned third stage of construction being never completed. During this original usage of the site, it was used as by the state government as a Customs House from 1879 to 1908, at which point a new building was built for that purpose. Simultaneously during this time, the site was used by the Post and Telegraph Office from 1879 to 1890 until a new office was constructed opposite the buildings. By the 1890s Western Australia was experiencing the gold rush, and thus due to increased business for the state, Fremantle Port was dredged. In response to this, commerce moved away from the buildings, and the site was vacated in 1909.

=== Government Stores Department era ===
While the Commissariat Buildings remained under governmental control from 1908–1923, it is not known what they were used for, until 1923 when the Government Stores Department occupied a part of it, which it would continue to do until it moved location in 1977. The Government Stores Department gradually gained control of most of the building, and through it, the buildings became the central point for exportation and importation of the state's goods. During this time, the building was damaged in various ways, as with the invention of the vehicle, some sections of the wooden block floors had to be replaced with concrete, and with the invention of the forklift, several arches were damaged. Simultaneously to its occupation by the Government Stores Department, the site had other tenants, including the Child Welfare Department during the 1930s, a maintenance section for Stateships between circa 1935 to 1975, the Fisheries and Wildlife Department from 1939 to 1981.

=== WA Shipwrecks Museum ===
In the 1970s the state and federal governments created legislation regarding the conservation of historic shipwrecks. With this, the Western Australian Museum considered its own conservation of maritime pieces, which, combined with the excavation of the Batavia, led to the State Government funding the conversion of the buildings into the Western Australian Maritime Museum shipwreck galleries, which were opened to the public in 1979. Today the site holds the WA Shipwrecks Museum and is listed on the City of Fremantle's Municipal Heritage List.

== Description ==
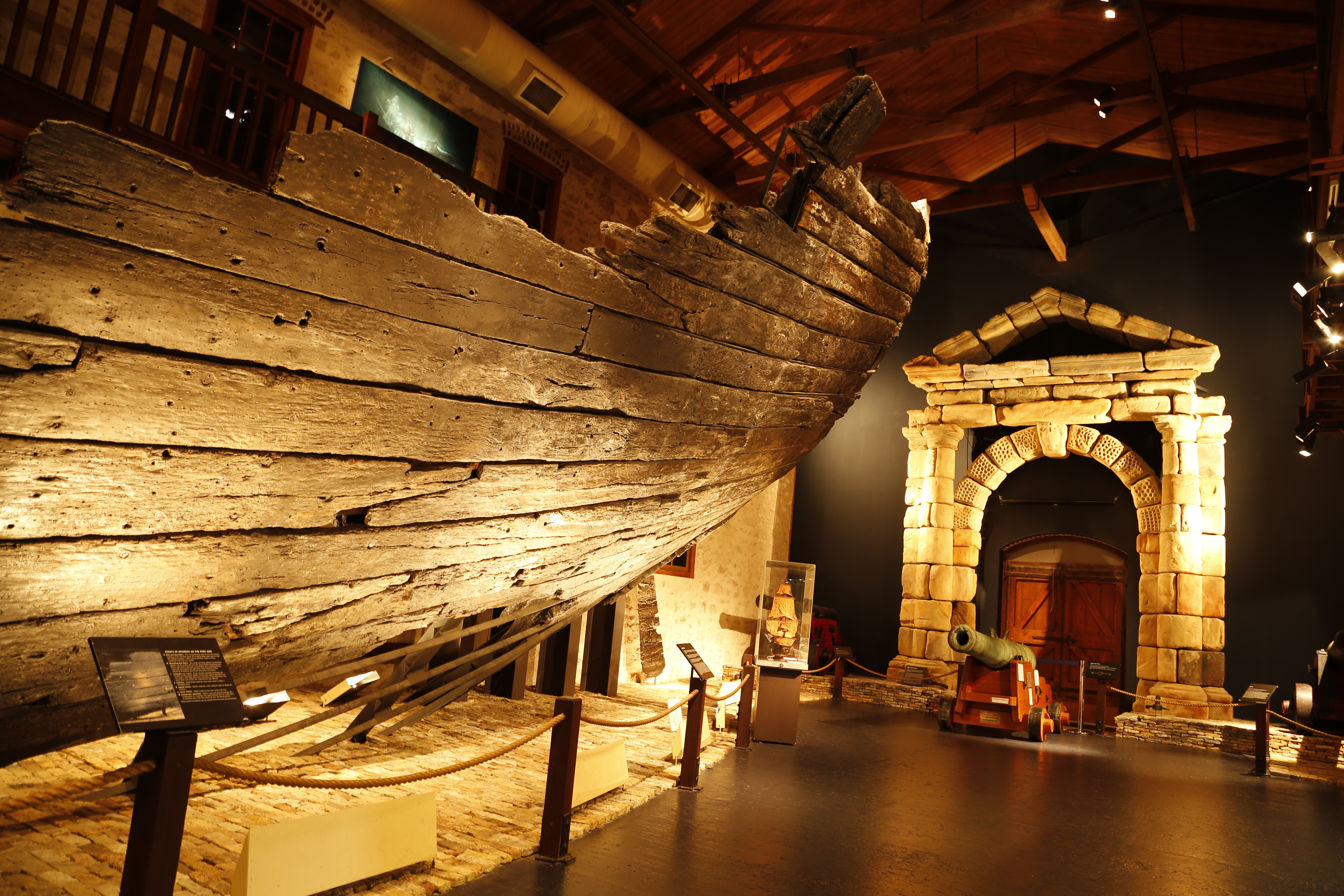
The stern section of the wrecked Dutch ship Batavia's hull and replica of gateway, both contained inside the Shipwrecks Museum

=== Design ===
The Commissariat Buildings, designed to be utilitarian by architect James Manning in a Victorian-Georgian and Victorian Regency style were built over 50 years, with construction beginning in 1852. The two buildings combine to heavily contribute to the general aesthetic of the West End of Fremantle, with the buildings themselves matching the aesthetic of surrounding buildings such as the Round House, the Old Kerosene Store at Bathers Beach and the former Court House located on Marine Terrace. The buildings themselves consist of two freestanding structures.

=== Warehouse ===
The most dominant of the two buildings is the two-story warehouse, which features dominant gables and incorporates the 'A' store (built in 1852), the 'B' store (built from 1860-1), the 'Drum' Store (built from 1895-6) and the 'New Store' (built in 1898), with all of these except the 'New Store' being built in the Victorian-Georgian style. The Warehouse faces out to Croke Lane, Marine Terrace and the railway reserve. The walls are made of coursed limestone rubble and the roof is made of Colorbond finished corrugated iron.

=== Administration building ===
The other building on the site is the smaller Administration Building, which is only two-story in parts. Due to the Administration Building being built for a different purpose than the warehouse building, it was built with a more complex, Victorian Regency style. Originally built in 1852, a southern extension was made circa 1894, with a northern two-story extension being made in 1896, and a further southern extension made in 1897.

== See also ==
- Convict era of Western Australia
- List of museums in Western Australia
