= Westfield Garden City =

Westfield Garden City may refer to two shopping centres in Australia that were renamed:

- Westfield Booragoon, Perth
- Westfield Mt Gravatt, Brisbane
