= Mount Pleasant Baptist Church =

- Mount Pleasant Baptist Church
- 32°02′25″S 115°49′29″E
- Address: Booragoon, Perth, Western Australia
- Country: Australia
- Denomination: Baptist
- Website: mounties.org.au

History
- Status: Church
- Founded: 1959

Mount Pleasant Baptist Church is a Baptist church in the suburb of Booragoon, in Perth, Western Australia, Australia. The church is affiliated with the Australian Baptist Ministries.

== Overview ==
The church was established in 1959 in the Perth suburb of Mount Pleasant. It later relocated to its present Booragoon location, but retained its previous name.

The church was at one point led by Graham Mabury, a pastor and former radio presenter. It is presently led by Nick Scott. The church has a congregation of around 1200–1300 people.

It also operates as an education institution, under the name Mount Pleasant Baptist Community College. It has hosted debates between Western Australian politicians on social issues.
