= James Manning (architect) =

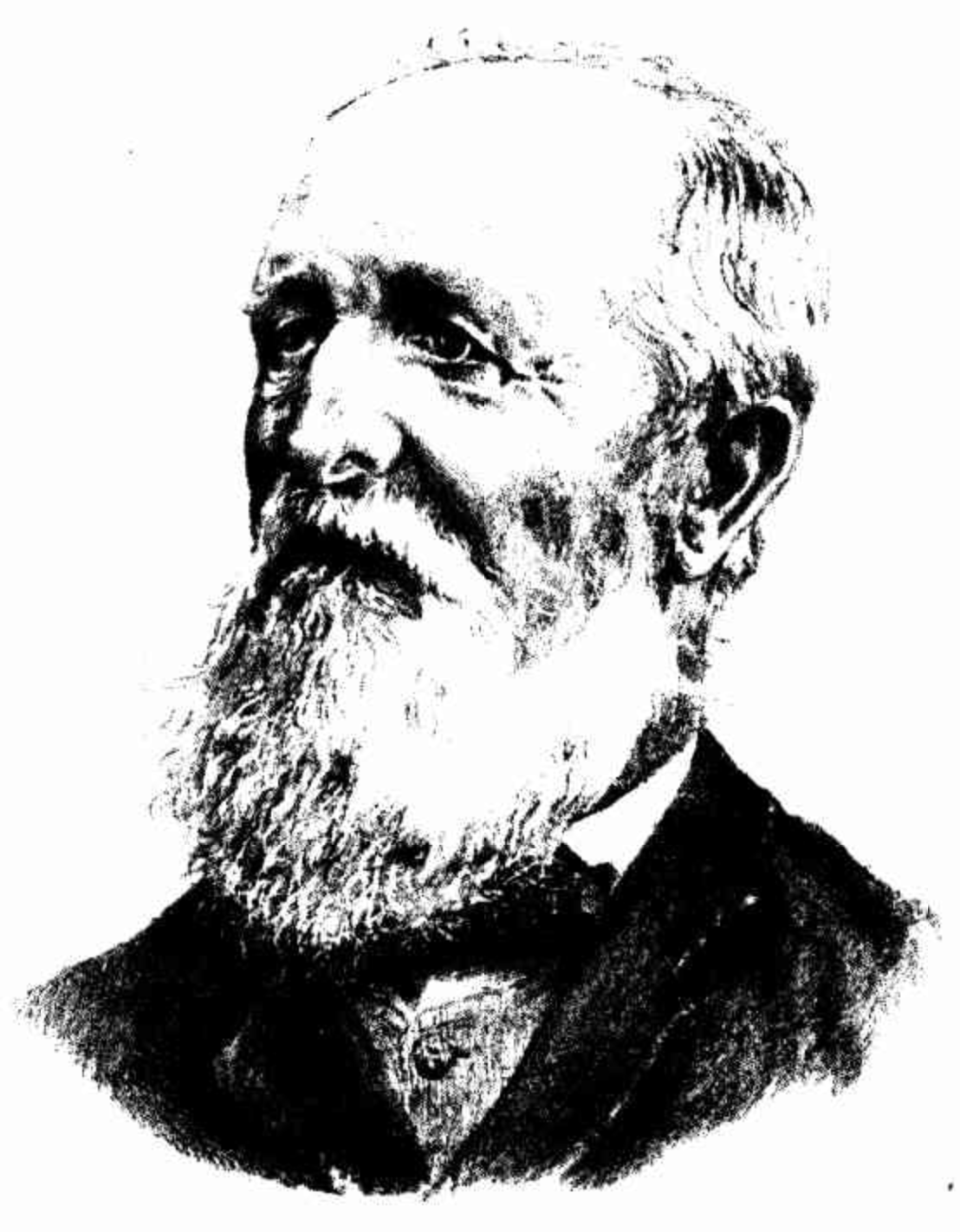
James Manning in 1888

James Manning (1814–1893) was an English born architect and builder, active in Perth Western Australia. He trained as a civil engineer, and worked in London, sailing to Perth in 1850 to assume the position of the Clerk of Works in the Comptroller-General's office in Western Australia. In this role he played an active part in the construction of a number of key colonial buildings.

Manning was known to have signed the plans for the following projects:

- Convict Depot (1856, 1859) at Mount Eliza
- Commissariat Stores (1856)
- Geraldton Courthouse (1866)
- Toodyay gaol (1868)
- Northampton Police Station (1867)
- Williams Police Station (1867)
- Kojonup Police Station (1868)
- Lower Blackwood Police Station (1868)
- Government House (Stage 2), Rottnest
- Wooden jetty, Albany
- Wooden jetty, Vasse
- Wooden jetty, Bunbury
- Wooden jetty, Fremantle
- Wooden jetty, Champion Bay
- Fremantle Traffic Bridge (1864–66)
- Old Bunbury Post Office and Bonded Store (fmr)

== Perth Town Hall ==
Manning is often attributed as being one of the designers of the Perth Town Hall (1867–179), although his contribution is more likely to have been in supervising the construction. Ray and John Oldham argued that Richard Roach Jewell was more likely to have been responsible for the design. He is thought to be responsible for the design of the Jarrah hammerbeam ceiling.
