= Booragoon bus station =

Bus station in Western Australia

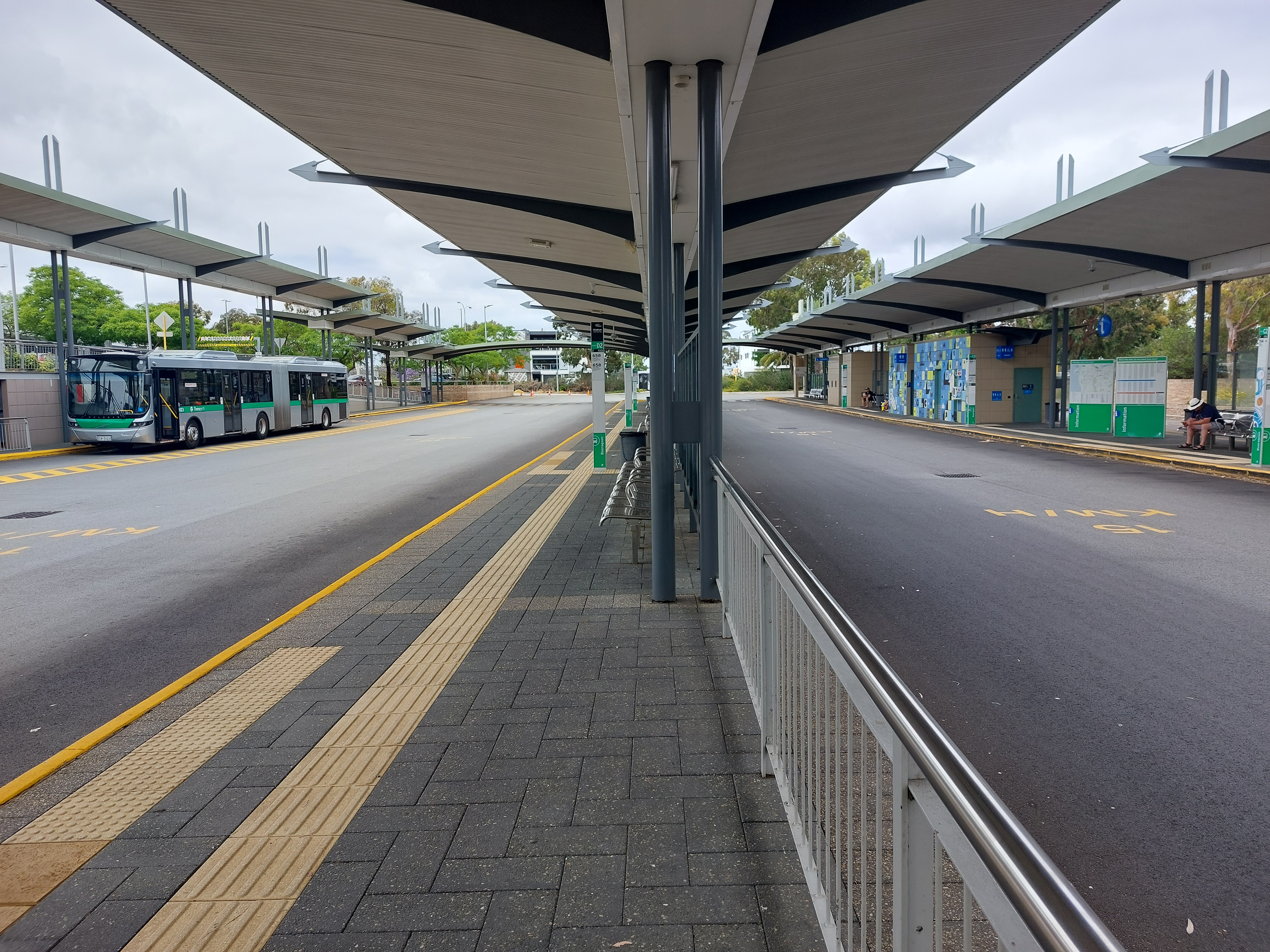

General information
- Location: Riseley Street, Booragoon, Western Australia; Australia
- Coordinates: 32°02′10″S 115°50′13″E
- Owner: Public Transport Authority
- Operator: Transperth
- Platforms: 2
- Bus routes: 8
- Bus stands: 14
- Connections: Bus

Construction
- Parking: No
- Cycle facilities: No

Other information
- Fare zone: 2

History
- Rebuilt: Yes
Location

Booragoon bus station is a Transperth bus station located next to the Westfield Booragoon shopping centre in Booragoon, Western Australia. It has 13 stands and is served by nine Transperth routes, in addition to a number of school buses and School Special services.

The original Booragoon bus station opened in September 1976.

Booragoon bus station is located at the corner of Riseley and Marmion Streets, and is the fourth bus station to have existed on the shopping centre premises, being built upon the site previously occupied by the Booragoon Hotel. Earlier iterations of the bus station have existed at various locations on the premises, including at the main entrance from Riseley Street, adjacent to the Booragoon Hotel (slightly west of the current ANZ Branch) and adjacent to Davy Street before that street was rerouted as a result of car-park expansions. Continued expansion of the shopping centre has necessitated construction of new stations.

== Bus routes ==
=== Platform A ===
Stop	Route	Destination / description	Notes
Stand A1	114	to Elizabeth Quay bus station via Canning Bridge station	
Stand A1	115	to Elizabeth Quay bus station via Canning Bridge station	Services all stops between Booragoon Bus Station and Canning Bridge Station as of 7 October 2018
Stand A1	160	to Hale Street, East Perth via Canning Bridge station & Elizabeth Quay Bus Station	
Stand A2	615	Special event services	
Stand A2	915	to Bull Creek station via Leach Highway	

=== Platform B ===
Stop	Route	Destination / description	Notes
Stand B1	500	to Bull Creek station via Canning Avenue & Adamson Road	
Stand B2	510	to Murdoch station via Murdoch Drive	
Stand B3		School Specials	
Stand B4	688	to Crown Perth, Burswood	

=== Platform C ===
Stop	Route	Destination / description	Notes
Stand C1	115	to Hamilton Hill via Winthrop & Kardinya	Limited Stops
Stand C2	114	to Lake Coogee via Marmion Street & Carrington Street	Limited Stops
Stand C3	160	to Fremantle station via Willagee and Hilton	Selected weekday off-peak services deviate via Allambi Homes
Stand C4	915	to Fremantle station via Marmion Street	

=== Platform D ===
Stop	Route	Destination / description	Notes
Stand D1	115	to Elizabeth Quay bus station via Canning Bridge station	Services all stops between Booragoon Bus Station and Canning Bridge Station as of 7 October 2018
Stand D2	658	to Perth Stadium Bus Station	Operates on selected Stadium Event Days only. Limited Stops services Riseley St. and Canning Hwy
Stand D2	658	to Hamilton Hill Hall	Operates on selected Stadium Event Days only. Limited Stops Service via Riseley St., Leach Hwy., North Lake Rd., South St. and Carrington St.
Stand D3			
Stand D4	500	to Fremantle station via Bicton and Attadale	One, school-days only PM extension, connects with 766 School Special from Melville Senior High School.
Stand D4	510	to Como/Clydesdale St. via Kintail Rd., Matheson Rd., & Canning Bridge station	Selected school-day trips in the AM and PM; AM trip terminates at Canning Bridge station
