= Mount Henry Bridge =

Bridge in Perth, Western Australia

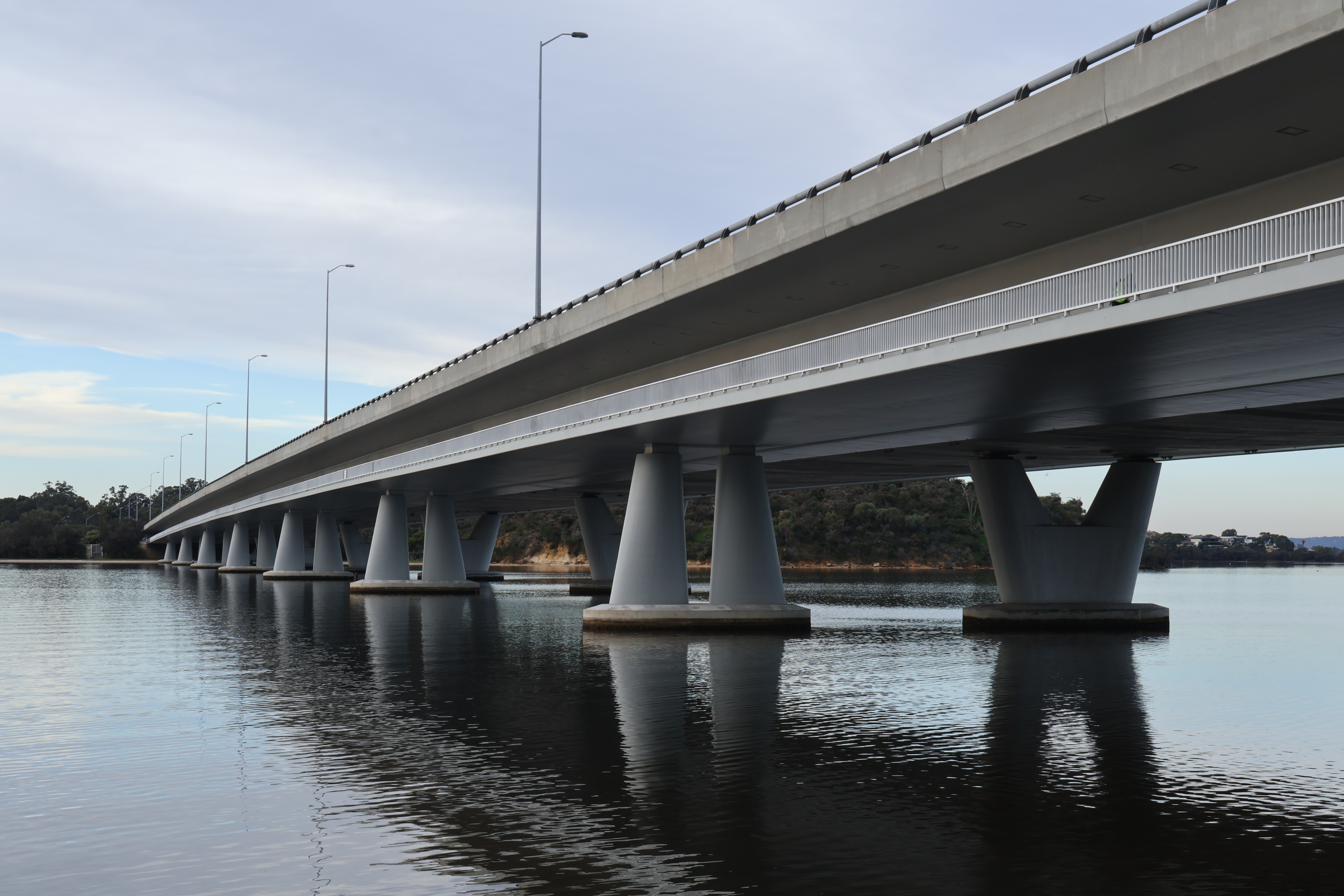
- Coordinates: 32°02′02″S 115°51′30″E
- Carries: Kwinana Freeway; Mandurah line
- Crosses: Canning River
- Locale: Salter Point and Mount Pleasant, Western Australia
- Maintained by: Main Roads Western Australia

Characteristics
- Material: Prestressed concrete
- Total length: 660 m (2,170 ft)
- Width: 40 m (130 ft)
- Longest span: 75 m (246 ft)
- No. of spans: 8
- Piers in water: 14 (7 per bridge)

History
- Construction start: June 1979
- Opened: 9 May 1982 (first bridge); 23 January 2006 (second bridge)

Western Australia Heritage Register
- Type: State Registered Place
- Designated: 16 April 2026
- Reference no.: 4794

Location
- Interactive map of Mount Henry Bridge

The Mount Henry Bridge is a pair of parallel bridges which carry the Kwinana Freeway and Mandurah line across the Canning River in Perth, Western Australia. At 660 metres (2,170 ft) long, the Mount Henry Bridge is the longest bridge in Western Australia. The first bridge opened in 1982 and carries the southbound freeway carriageway and both tracks for the Mandurah line. The second bridge opened in 2006 and carries the northbound freeway carriageway.

The first Mount Henry Bridge was built as part of an extension of the Kwinana Freeway from Canning Highway to South Street. Construction started in June 1979 and it opened to traffic on 9 May 1982. It was built by Clough and Sons for A$13.5 million.

The second Mount Henry Bridge was built as part of the construction of the Mandurah line. It was originally planned for extra lanes to be added to both sides of the bridge and for the railway to go in the middle of the bridge, but this was changed so that a new bridge would be built on the western side of the existing bridge, and that the Mandurah line would go on the original bridge, reducing costs. Construction began in May 2004 and the new bridge opened to traffic on 22–23 January 2006. The Mandurah line opened on 23 December 2007. The new bridge was constructed by Leighton Contractors for $23 million. In 2026, the Mount Henry Bridge was added to the State Register of Heritage Places.

== History ==
The 1955 Plan for the Metropolitan Region, Perth and Fremantle said that the future Kwinana Freeway would cross the Canning River near the Mount Henry Peninsula, but when the Metropolitan Region Scheme was adopted in 1963, it reserved land for the freeway to cross the Canning River slightly downstream, at Deep Water Point. In 1967, the proposed bridge location was changed back to the Mount Henry Peninsula, after objections by the City of Melville. This was despite concerns about the freeway spoiling the untouched shoreline of the peninsula. The Parliament of Western Australia approved this in 1975, and so the Metropolitan Region Scheme was amended to include the Mount Henry Peninsula route.

=== First bridge ===
External image
- Temporary cable-stayed truss via Engineering Heritage Australia

The first Mount Henry Bridge was built as part of a 6.5-kilometre (4.0 mi) extension of the Kwinana Freeway from Canning Highway to South Street. It was designed by engineers from the Main Roads Department. Thirteen preliminary designs were created, of which nine were developed further. The eventual design, a nine-span prestressed concrete bridge, was chosen due to its limited visual impact on the landscape and because it best allowed for boats and water skiers to use the river. The contract to build the bridge was awarded to Clough and Sons. Construction began in June 1979. The bridge was constructed using a temporary cable-stayed truss and formwork which was moved along the bridge as it was built, making it unnecessary to use temporary piles in the river. The 242 concrete deck segments and sixteen diaphragm segments were fabricated onsite. The bridge and freeway extension were opened on 9 May 1982 by the premier of Western Australia, Ray O'Connor. The bridge cost A$13.5 million to build.

=== Second bridge ===
External image
- Incremental launching via Engineering Heritage Australia

The second bridge was built as part of Package E of the construction of the Mandurah line. This package was managed by Main Roads Western Australia and consisted of modifications to the Kwinana Freeway to make way for the Mandurah line. The original bridge was strengthened to withstand the weight of trains. The contract for Package E was signed with Leighton Contractors in January 2004.

Construction began in May 2004. The existing Mount Henry Bridge was originally planned to be widened, but Leighton proposed building a second bridge on the western side instead, which reduced traffic disruptions and saved $17 million. The bridge was incrementally launched. As the 76-metre (249 ft) spans were considered too long for incremental launching, temporary piers were constructed between the permanent piers.

The new bridge opened on 22–23 January 2006, allowing work on the rail corridor to begin on the original bridge. The whole bridge widening project cost $23 million. The Mandurah line opened on 23 December 2007.

== Design ==
External image
- Cross section of the two bridges via Engineering Heritage Australia

The original bridge is 660 metres (2,170 ft) long, 28.8 metres (94 ft) wide, and built from post-tensioned concrete. It is a twin-cell concrete box girder bridge which was constructed segmentally. It carried three freeway lanes in each direction and had a shared path cantilevered underneath on both sides.

The second bridge was designed to blend in with the first bridge. The piers were designed to complement the original piers, but due to the new bridge's smaller size, the piers were not designed to be identical. As there were space constraints, the second bridge overlaps the original bridge but does not touch it, resulting in them appearing as a single continuous structure.

In 2024, the Mount Henry Bridge was awarded an Engineering Heritage Marker by Engineers Australia. The bridge has been on the City of South Perth's local heritage register since 2000. In 2026, it was added to the State Register of Heritage Places.

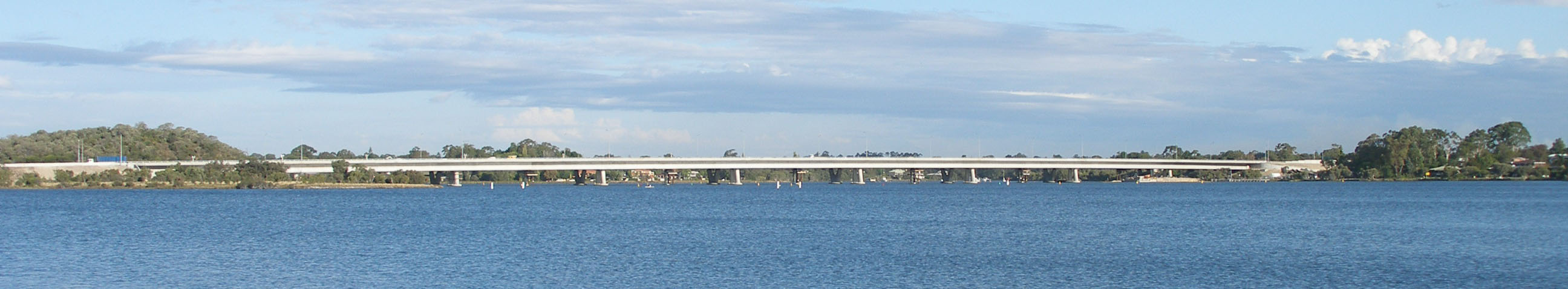

== See also ==
- List of State Register of Heritage Places in the City of Melville
- List of State Register of Heritage Places in the City of South Perth
