= List of museums in Australia =

This list of museums in the Australia contains lists of museums which are defined for this context as institutions (including nonprofit organisations, government entities, and private businesses) that collect and care for objects of cultural, artistic, scientific, or historical interest and make their collections or related exhibits available for public viewing. Also included are non-profit art galleries and university art galleries.

== By state and territory ==
- List of museums in the Australian Capital Territory
- List of museums in New South Wales
  - List of museums in Sydney
- List of museums in the Northern Territory
- List of museums in Queensland
  - List of museums in Brisbane
- List of museums in South Australia
- List of museums in Tasmania
- List of museums in Victoria (Australia)
  - List of museums in Melbourne
- List of museums in Western Australia

== By subject ==
- List of aviation museums in Australia
- List of computer museums in Australia
- List of contemporary art museums in Australia
- List of music museums in Australia
- List of Holocaust memorials and museums in Australia
- List of natural history museums in Australia
- List of open-air and living history museums in Australia
- List of railway museums in Australia
- List of science museums in Australia
- List of transport museums in Australia

== See also ==
- List of Art museums and galleries in Australia
- List of museums
