= Perth Town Hall =

Town hall in Perth, Western Australia

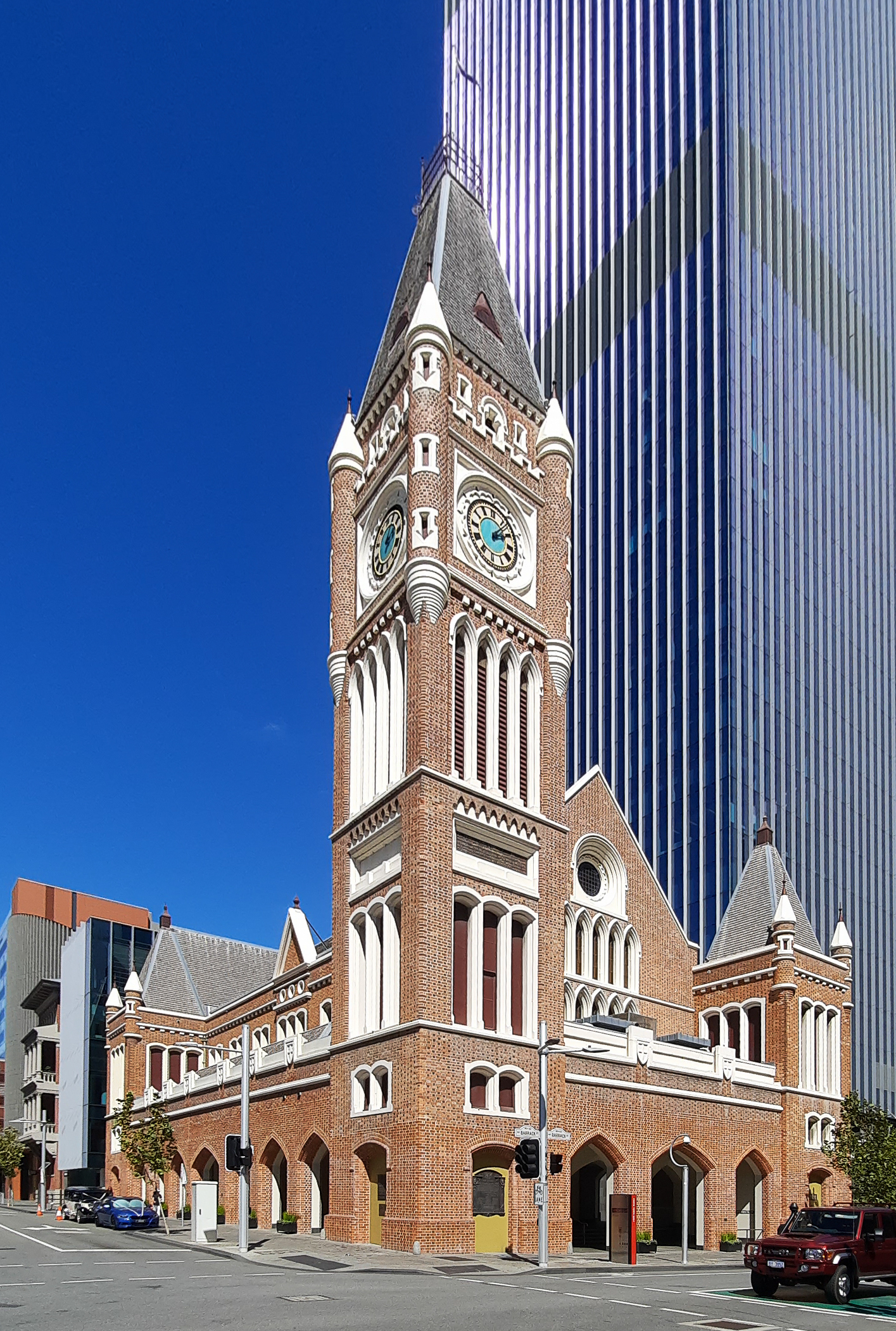

General information
- Type: Town hall
- Architectural style: Victorian Free Gothic
- Location: Corner of Hay Street and Barrack Street, Perth
- Coordinates: 31°57′18″S 115°51′38″E
- Current tenants: City of Perth
- Groundbreaking: 24 May 1867
- Completed: 1870
- Owner: City of Perth

Design and construction
- Architects: Richard Roach Jewell & James Manning

Western Australia Heritage Register
- Type: State Registered Place
- Designated: 23 May 1995
- Reference no.: 1953

The Perth Town Hall, situated on the corner of Hay and Barrack streets in Perth, Western Australia, is the only town hall built by convicts in Australia. Upon completion, it was the tallest structure in Perth.

== History ==
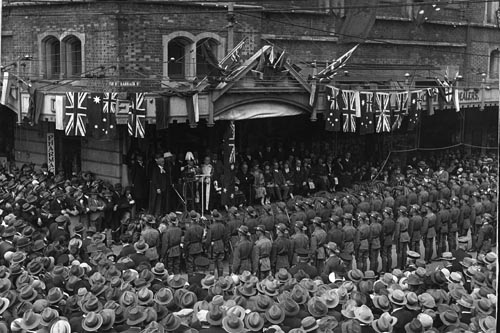
Perth Town Hall August 1929

Designed by Richard Roach Jewell and James Manning in the Victorian Free Gothic style, the hall was built by convicts and free men between 1867 and 1870. The exterior brickwork was laid in Flemish bond, and bricks were made from clay sourced from East Perth. Its decorations contain a number of convict motifs, including windows in the shape of the broad arrow, and decorations in the shape of a hangman's rope.

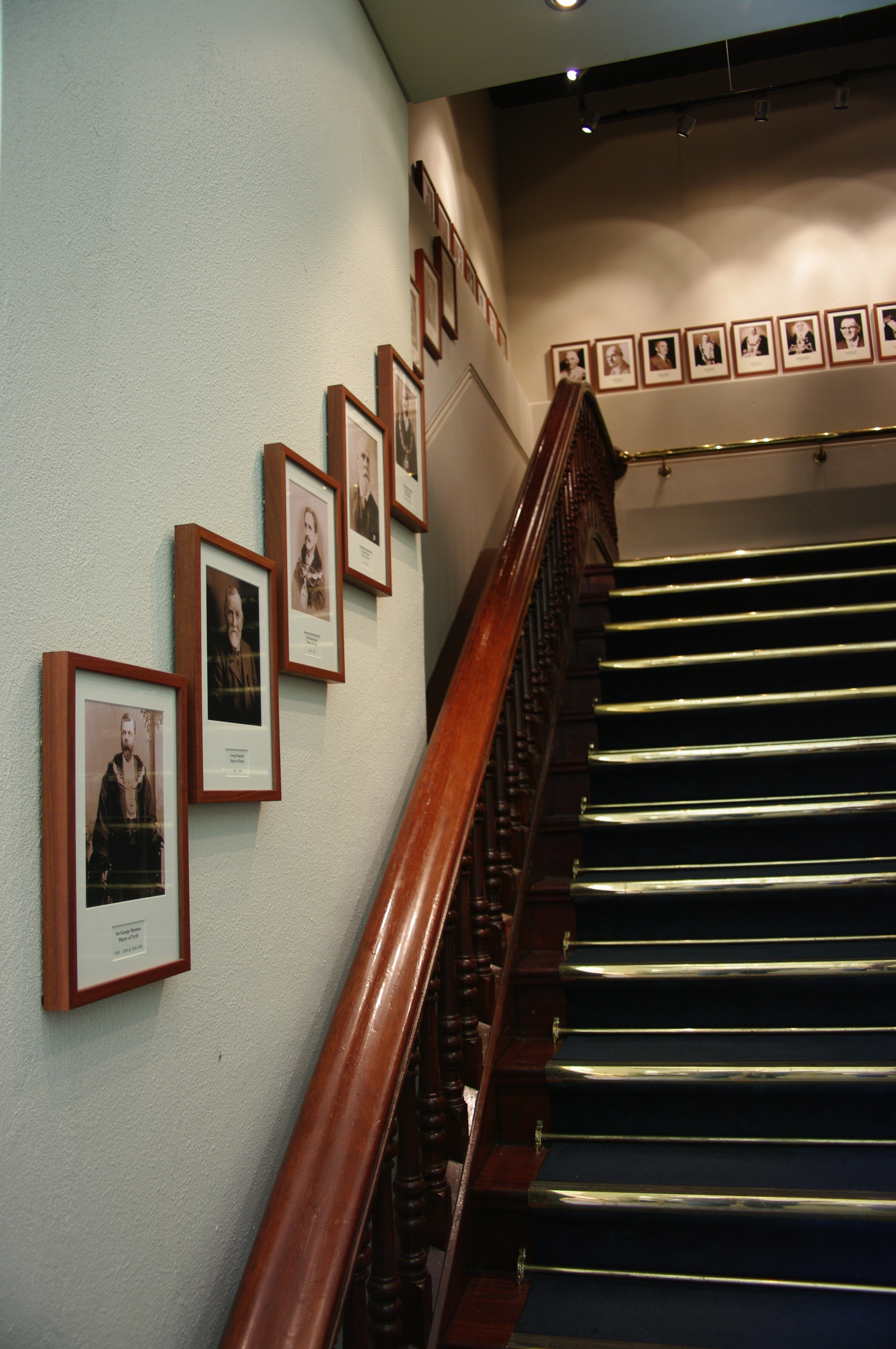
Looking up the jarrah staircase; photographs on the wall are of each Lord Mayor of Perth, starting with George Shenton

The foundation stone for Perth Town Hall was laid on 24 May 1867 by Governor Hampton in a ceremony involving a lot of pomp and parade. However, there were torrential downpours. The ceremony went on anyway with an official procession from Government House and a mock battle performed by the Volunteer Regiments, Enrolled Forces of Pensioners, and the WA Country Regiment.

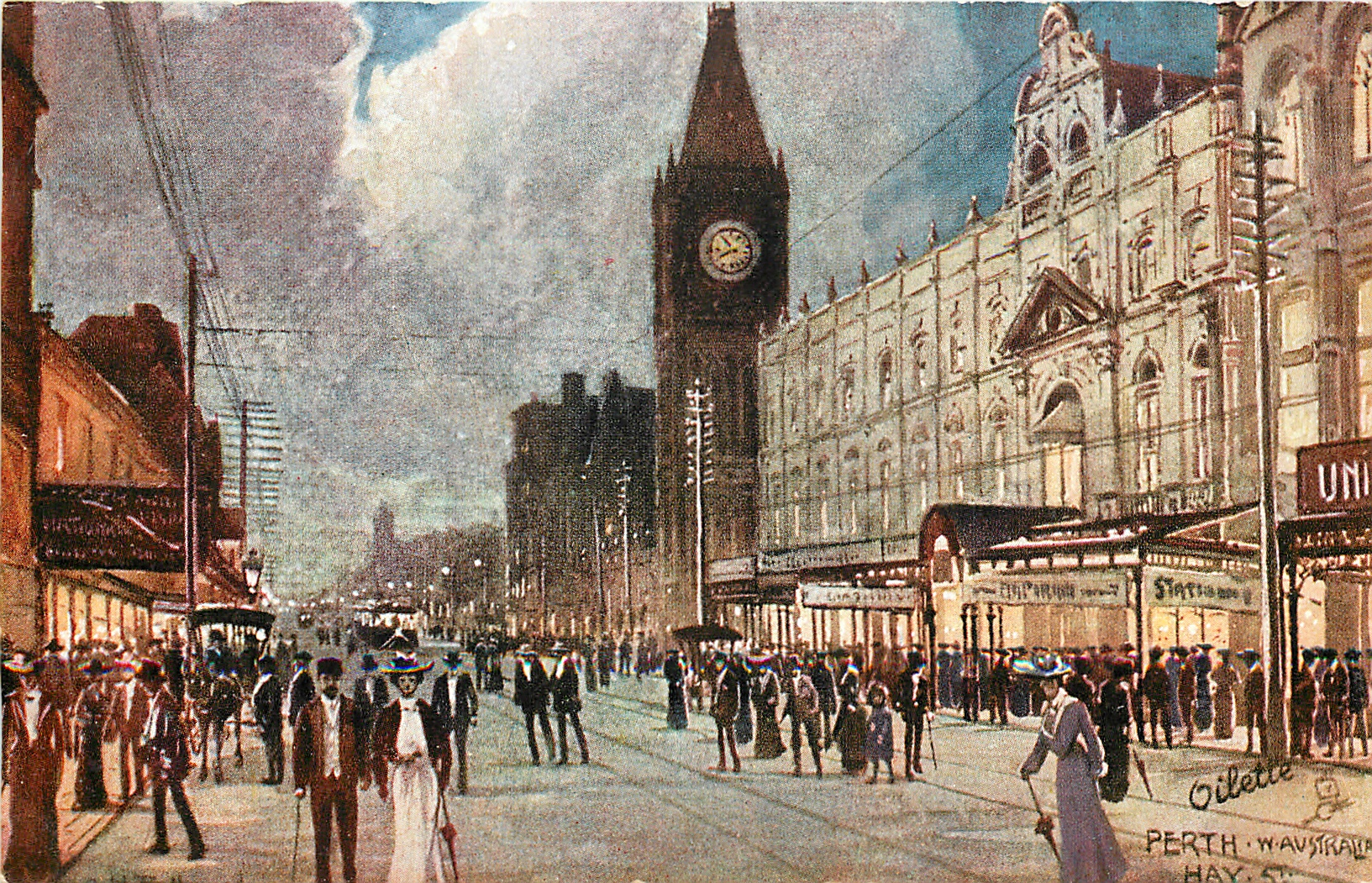
Hay Street by Albert Henry Fullwood, c. 1911

In the 1929 centenary of Western Australia one of the events in the city of Perth was the placing of a commemorative plaque in the northwest corner of the building by the Governor William Campion.

For many decades in the 20th century, shops were built into the sides of the ground floor, and the public lavatories accessible from Barrack Street were the only ones available for some distance. The shops included a pharmacy, bank, lunch bar and other shops. All these businesses and the attendant structures were removed prior to the renovation of the hall.

At the time of its centenary in 1970, the ground floor was still full of commercial businesses.

The Town Hall was restored in the late 1990s at the base in an award-winning restoration to repair the interior of the hall and the gothic arches at its base, which were "modernised" in the middle of the 20th century.
