= Booragoon, Western Australia =

Booragoon
- Suburb
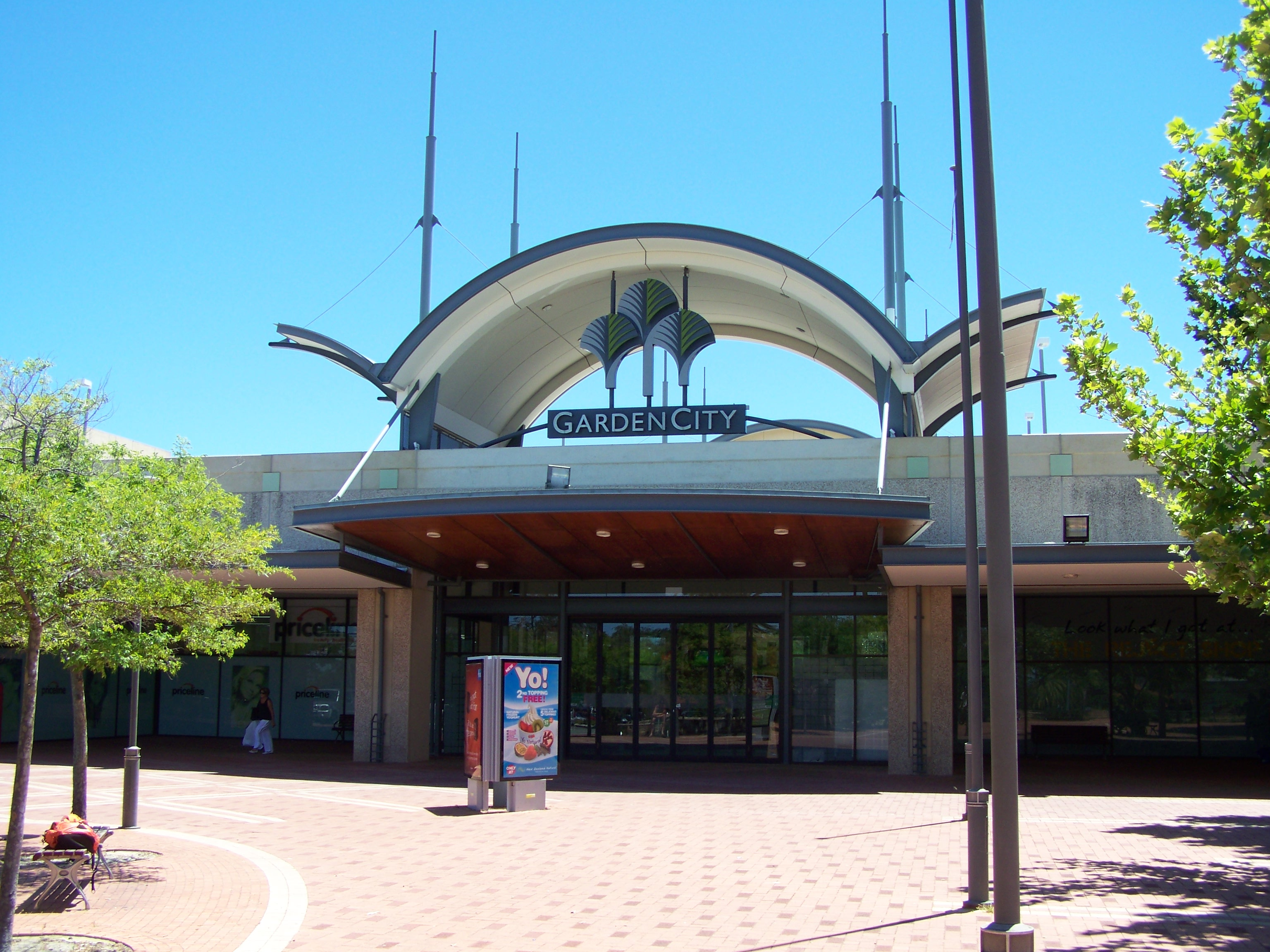
- Garden City, Booragoon
- Interactive map of Booragoon
- Coordinates: 32°02′22″S 115°50′01″E
- Country: Australia
- State: Western Australia
- City: Perth
- LGA: City of Melville
- Location: 12 km (7.5 mi) from the Perth CBD
- Established: 1950s

Government
  - State electorate: Bateman
  - Federal division: Tangney

Population
  - Total: 5,684 (SAL 2021)
- Postcode: 6154
Suburbs around Booragoon
Alfred Cove	Ardross	Mount Pleasant
Myaree	Booragoon	Brentwood
Winthrop	Winthrop	Bateman

Booragoon is a southern suburb of Perth, Western Australia, located within the City of Melville.

Booragoon is the indigenous name for the lower reaches of the Canning River.

It is home to Westfield Booragoon (formerly the Garden City Shopping Centre) and the council offices for the City of Melville. Transport is provided by the nearby Booragoon bus station.

Mount Pleasant Baptist Church is in Booragoon.

== Transport ==
=== Bus ===
==== Bus Stations ====
- Booragoon Bus Station

==== Bus Routes ====
- 114 Elizabeth Quay Bus Station to Lake Coogee – serves Riseley Street, Booragoon Bus Station and Marmion Street
- 115 Elizabeth Quay Bus Station to Hamilton Hill Memorial Hall – serves Riseley Street, Booragoon Bus Station and Leach Highway
- 160 WACA Ground to Fremantle Station – serves Coomoora Road, Riseley Street, Booragoon Bus Station and Davy Street
- 500 Bull Creek Station to Booragoon Bus Station – serves Canning Avenue, Karoonda Road and Riseley Street
- 502 Bull Creek Station to Fremantle Station – serves Leach Highway
- 503, 504 and 505 Bull Creek Station to Murdoch Station – serve Leach Highway
- 510 Booragoon Bus Station to Murdoch Station – serves Riseley Street and Leach Highway
- 915 Bull Creek Station to Fremantle Station (high frequency) – serves Leach Highway, Riseley Street, Booragoon Bus Station and Marmion Street
