= Ardross, Western Australia =

Ardross
- Suburb
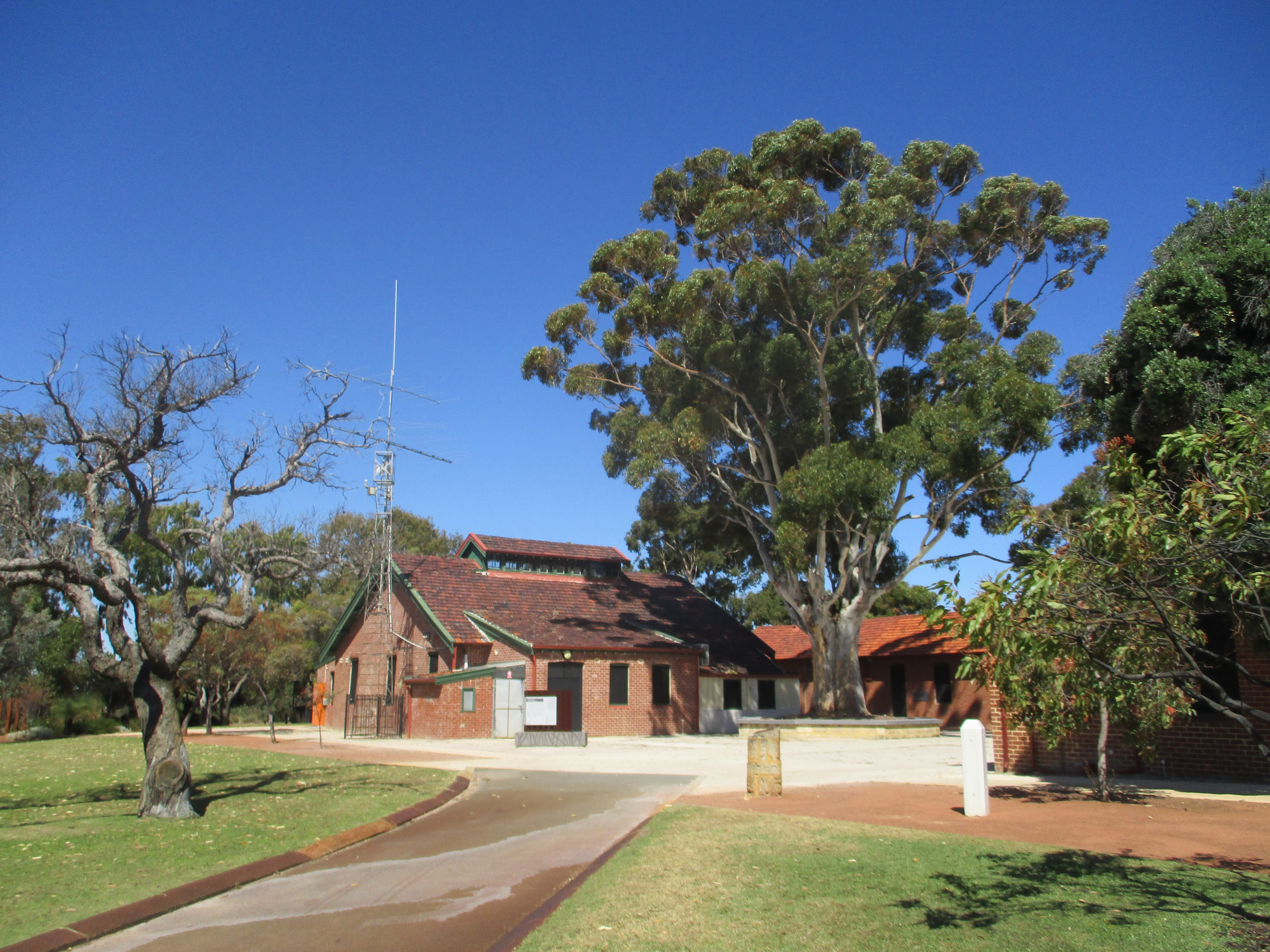
- Wireless Hill Museum, Ardross
- Interactive map of Ardross
- Coordinates: 32°01′38″S 115°50′08″E
- Country: Australia
- State: Western Australia
- City: Perth
- LGA: City of Melville
- Location: 9 km (5.6 mi) from Perth

Government
  - State electorate: Alfred Cove
  - Federal division: Tangney

Population
  - Total: 4,578 (SAL 2021)
- Postcode: 6153
Suburbs around Ardross
Applecross	Applecross	Applecross
Alfred Cove	Ardross	Mount Pleasant
Booragoon	Booragoon	Mount Pleasant

Ardross is a suburb of Perth, Western Australia, located within the City of Melville. It was once an area of land acquired by the Scotsman, Sir Alexander Percival Matheson in 1896. In Matheson's subdivision of the adjoining suburb of Applecross, he created "Ardross Street" naming it after either the town of Ardrossan on the Scottish west coast or Ardross Castle, located about 40 kilometres north of Inverness. The suburb derives its name from this street.

== Location ==
Ardross, together with Applecross and Mount Pleasant, is situated on a peninsula jutting into the Swan River. Ardross is roughly bordered by:

- the aforementioned Ardross Street to the east
- Canning Highway to the north
- Wireless Hill Park to the west
- Garden City shopping centre to the south

== Wireless Hill ==
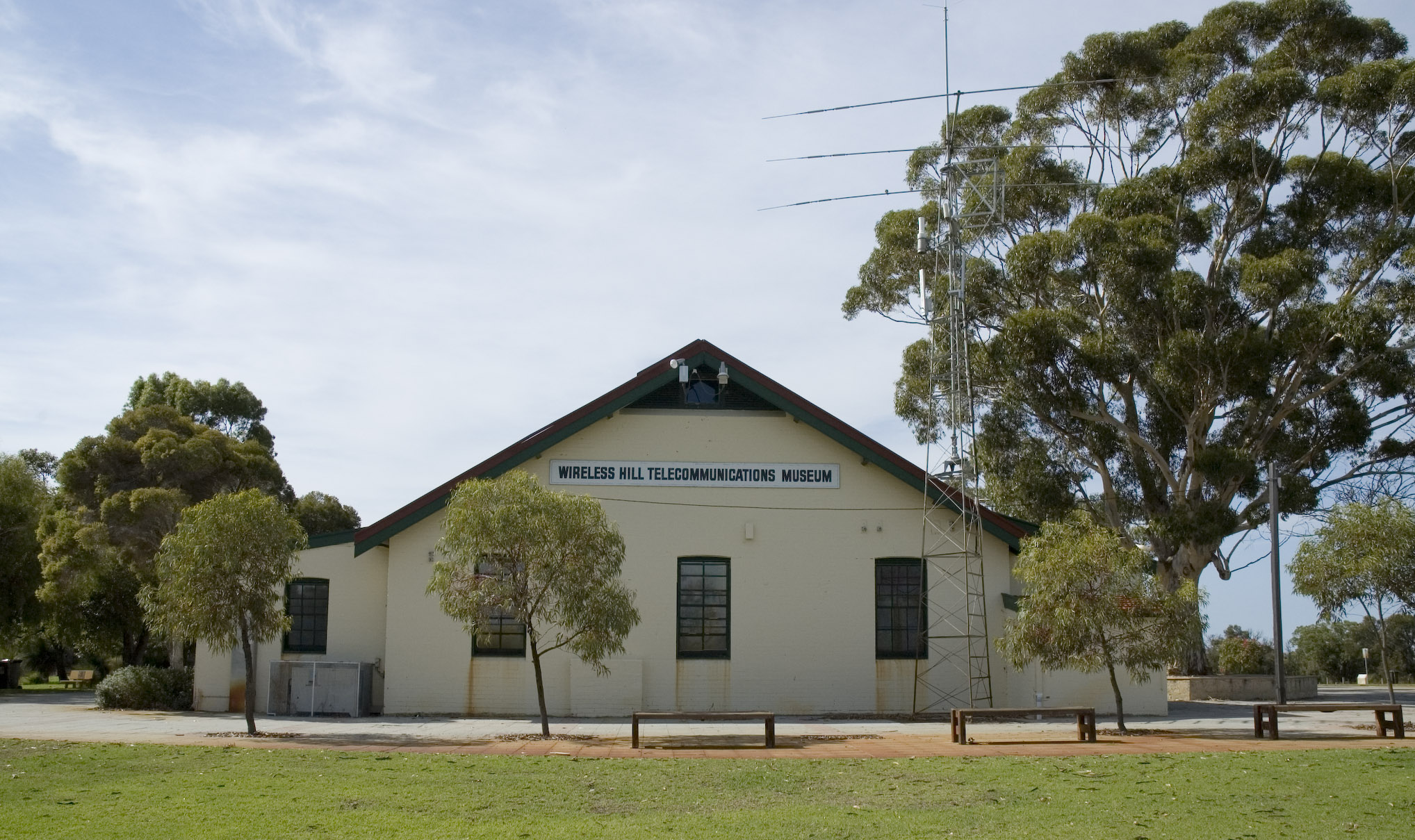
Wireless Hill Museum.

Within the suburb's boundaries are the Wireless Hill Museum and lookout, from where river vistas can be viewed. This is the landmark site of the first communications radio in Western Australia and now an oasis for wildflowers and rabbits. The hill was mostly denuded for its original telecommunication purpose and then left to the ravages of weeds. Since 1985, however, extensive replanting of mostly native species has resulted in a diverse collection of 20,000 - 30,000 plants. During late winter and spring, orchids, Geraldton wax, wattles, grevilleas, callistemon and kangaroo paws may be seen.

== Transport ==
=== Bus ===
- 114 Elizabeth Quay Bus Station to Lake Coogee – serves Canning Highway and Riseley Street
- 115 Elizabeth Quay Bus Station to Hamilton Hill Memorial Hall – serves Canning Highway and Riseley Street
- 160 WACA Ground to Fremantle Station – serves Coomoora Road and Davy Street

Bus routes serving Canning Highway:

- 111 WACA Ground to Fremantle Station
- 148 Como to Fremantle Station
- 158 Elizabeth Quay Bus Station to Fremantle Station
- 910 Perth Busport to Fremantle Station (high frequency)

== Photos of the suburb ==
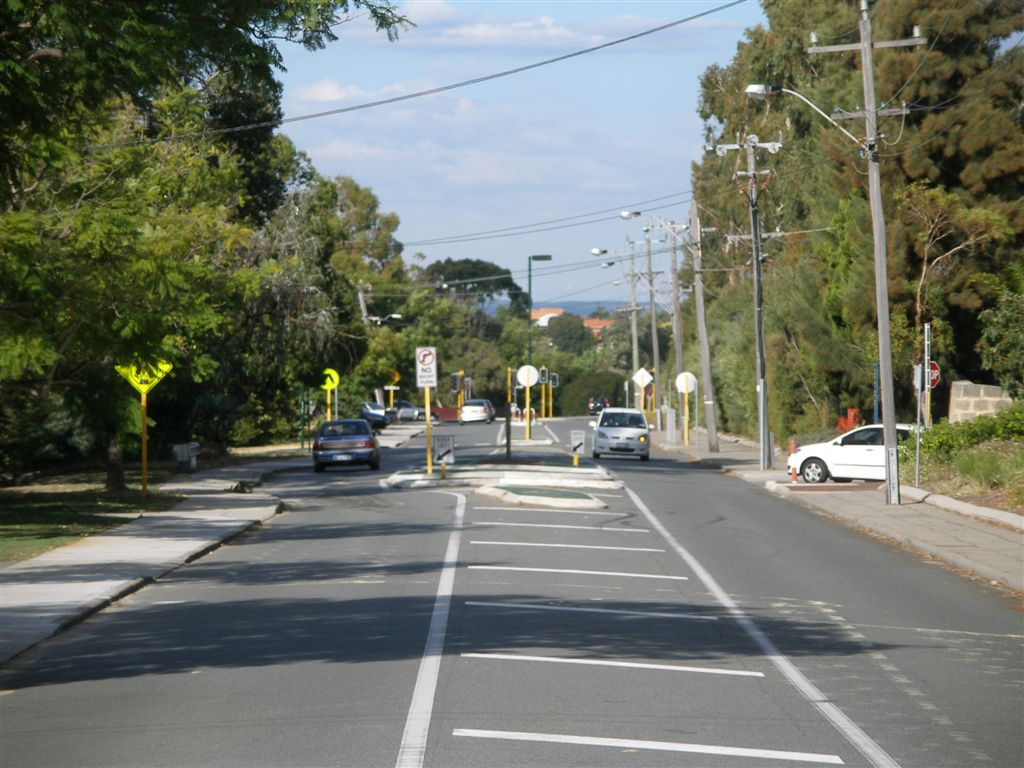
Almondbury Road, adjacent to Garden City Shopping Centre

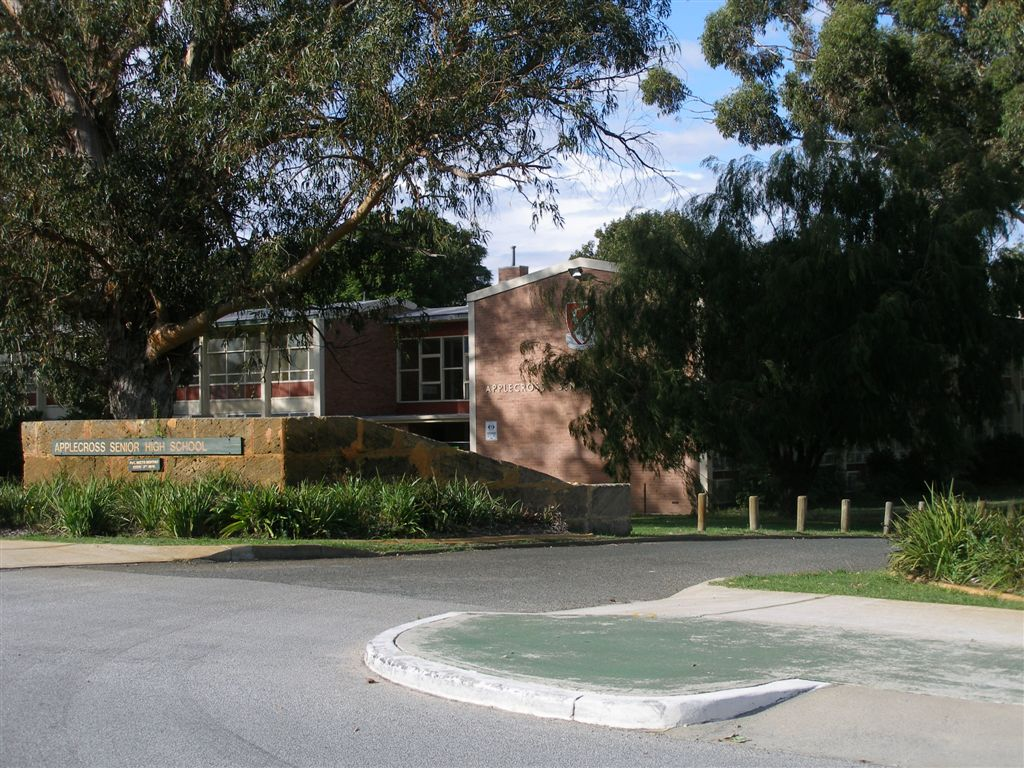
Applecross Senior High School, located in Ardross

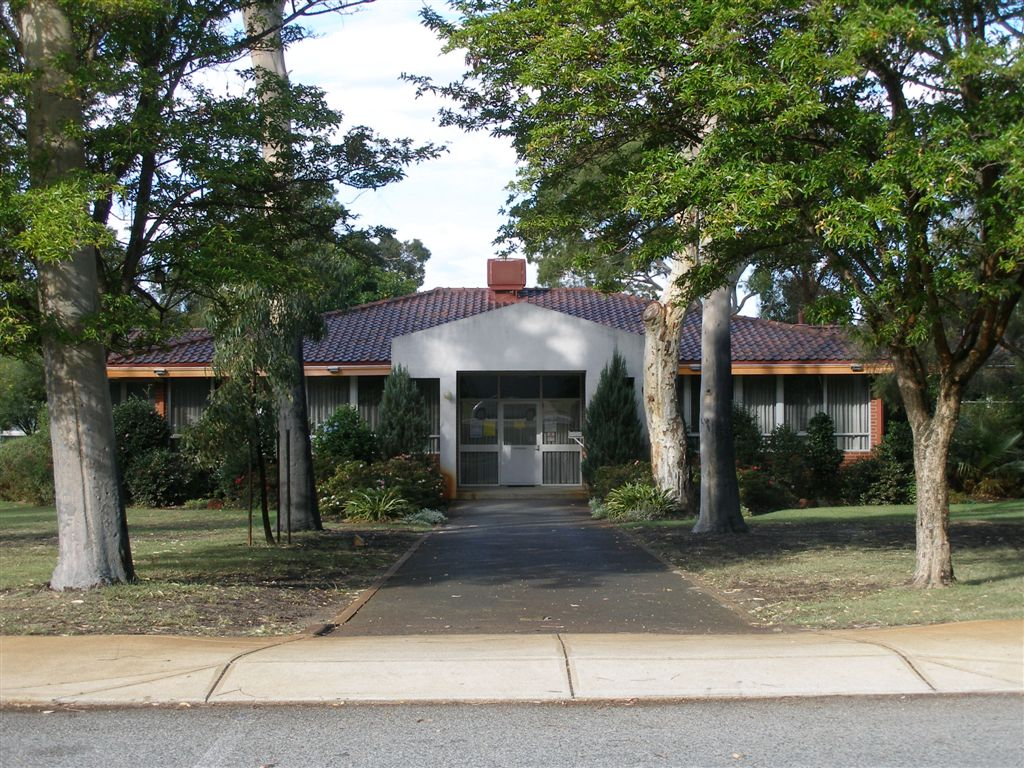
Ardross Primary School

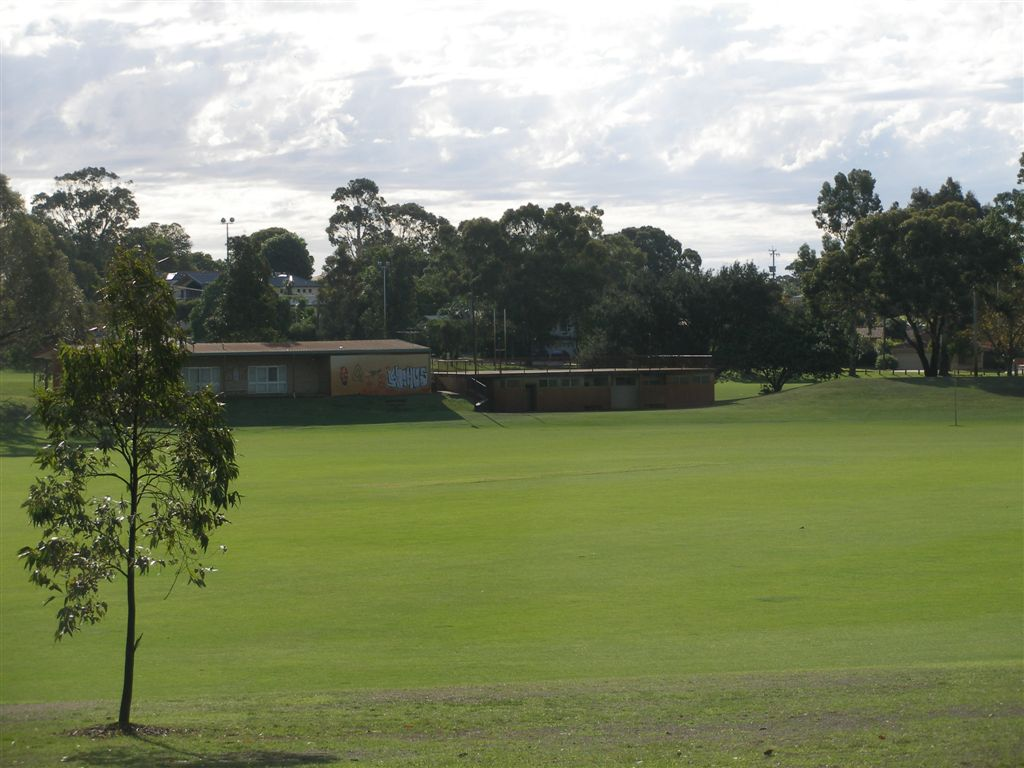
Shirley Strickland Reserve

== General references ==
- Department of Land Information. StreetSmart Perth Street Directory (54th ed.). West Australian Newspapers. p. 400. ISBN 978-0-909439-67-5.
