= Westfield Booragoon =

Shopping centre in Perth, Western Australia

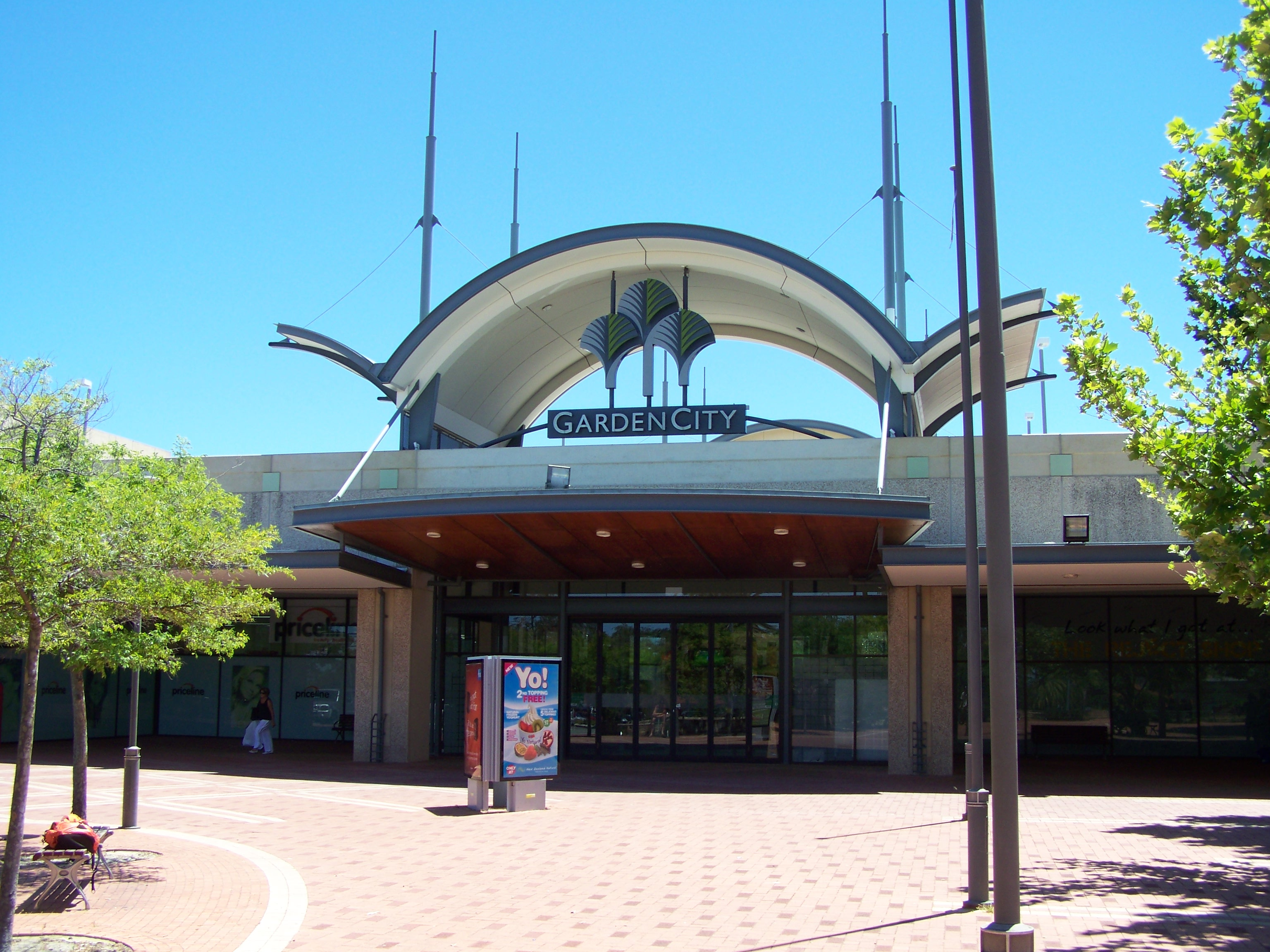
- Entrance to Westfield Booragoon
- Location: Booragoon, Western Australia
- Coordinates: 32°02′02″S 115°50′10″E
- Opened: 1972
- Previous names: Garden City
- Manager: Scentre Group
- Owner: Dexus (50%); Scentre Group (50%)
- Num. of stores: 174+
- Num. of anchor tenants: 6
- Floor area: 72,843 m^{2} (784,080 sq ft)
- Floors: 3
- Website: Official website

Westfield Booragoon (formerly known as Garden City) is a major regional shopping centre in Perth, Western Australia. It is located at the corner of Marmion and Riseley streets in the southern suburb of Booragoon. Dexus and Scentre Group each own 50%.

Garden City has been managed under AMP Shopping Centres since 1986; Scentre Group has managed it since December 2019.

== History and development ==
In the late 1960s, the planning department of the state government drew up a plan for several 'sub-regional' retail centres, which would form the commercial and economic focus of each 'node', and take the retail burden away from the CBD. Booragoon, in the southern suburbs, was chosen as one of the ideal locations.

It was decided to be named 'Garden City' and construction work was undertaken by Hooker Corporation which began in 1970. In December 1971, Lady Lloyd Jones placed a time-capsule in the ground. The centre was opened in 1972, and immediately became popular as the nexus of the Melville Civic Centre Complex, which had been established after the Melville Council Offices were built in 1968. The site was in the midst of sandy bush, not far from Applecross Senior High School and Wireless Hill Park.

On opening in 1972, the original centre consisted of three anchor tenants connected by covered malls to a central atrium. To the north was a three-level David Jones department store (now Myer), to the south was a two-level Boans store with provision for addition of a third level (now David Jones) and to the west a single level Coles variety store. The connecting malls were lined with specialty shops. On the south-west side a five-level office building, Garden City House, was also opened.

In 2019, Scentre Group purchased a 50% shareholding from AMP Capital. In 2021, Dexus purchased AMP Capital's other 50%.

=== Redevelopments ===
==== 2021 redevelopment ====
After AMP shelved redevelopment plans in December 2020, it was announced that the Booragoon Civic Square Library, which sits next to Westfield Booragoon, would be demolished for redevelopment space of the centre. Almost a year later, on 9 November 2021, funding for a $500 million redevelopment to the centre were found. On 28 November 2021, the proposed plans were publicly released, growing the centre to 109,375 square metres (1,177,300 sq ft) of retail space and making it the third largest shopping centre in Western Australia. The redevelopment was split into two stages and consisted of:

- First stage
  - New Fresh Food precinct, which included a relocated Woolworths supermarket, and a new Aldi.
  - Outdoor entertainment and dining precinct featuring over 15 restaurants and stores across two floors, including a 9 screen Hoyts cinema complex.
  - 53 additional stores, including a relocated food court.
  - Refurbished Myer and existing centre.
- Second stage
  - A new fashion mall featuring 45 new stores, including a relocated and expanded David Jones.

Plans were approved in late 2021, but received an extension to the end of 2023 to update the plans further.

Zara at Westfield Booragoon closed permanently late September 2021 to open at Karrinyup shopping centre as part of a major redevelopment of that centre.

On 3 February 2023, it was reported that plans were once again changed, this time on a larger scale. The total cost being up to nearly $800 million, and size being boosted up to 114,620 square metres (1,233,800 sq ft), which would make it the largest shopping centre in Western Australia. Plans were approved the following week.

== Architectural features ==
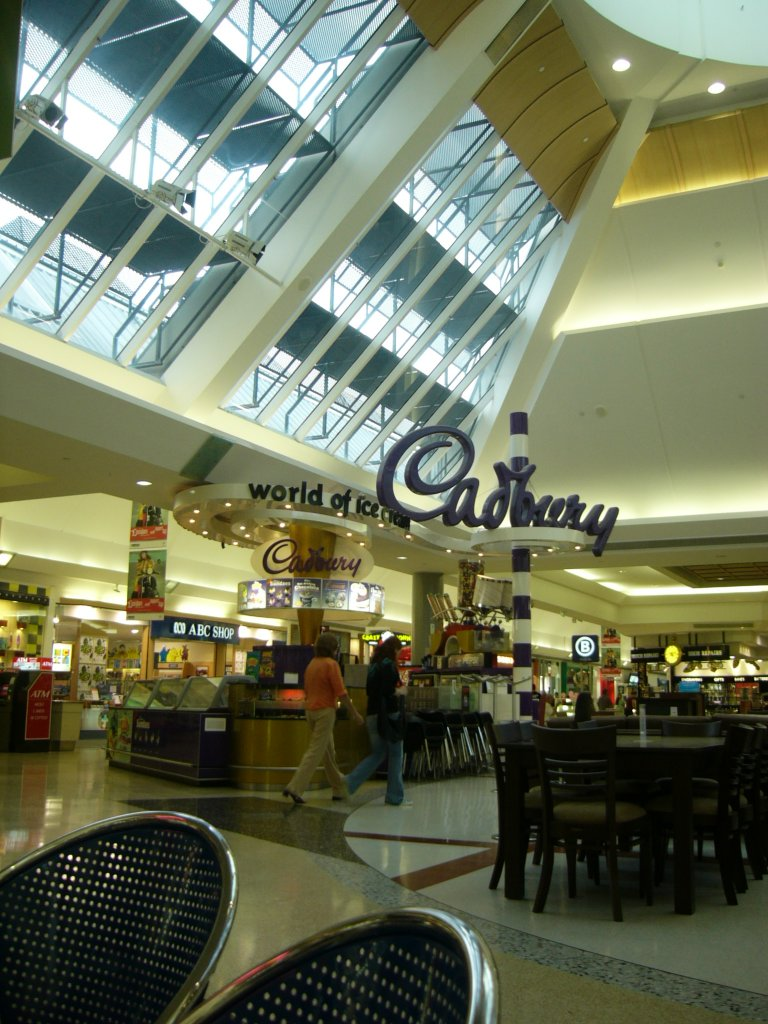
The glass atrium, pictured in 2006.

As part of the major redevelopment in 1999 and 2000, a significant number of new striking architectural and aesthetic features were added, including a three-storey atrium at the eastern end of the complex in the fashion mall. Recent developments have made the shopping centre a greener place with more plants and more sustainable technology.

== Transport ==
A key Transperth bus station for the southern suburbs, the Booragoon bus station, is located at the corner of Riseley and Marmion streets, and is the fourth bus station to have existed on the shopping centre premises. A number of mainline and feeder bus services operate from or via the station.

Westfield Booragoon has both undercover and rooftop open-air parking.

== Facilities ==
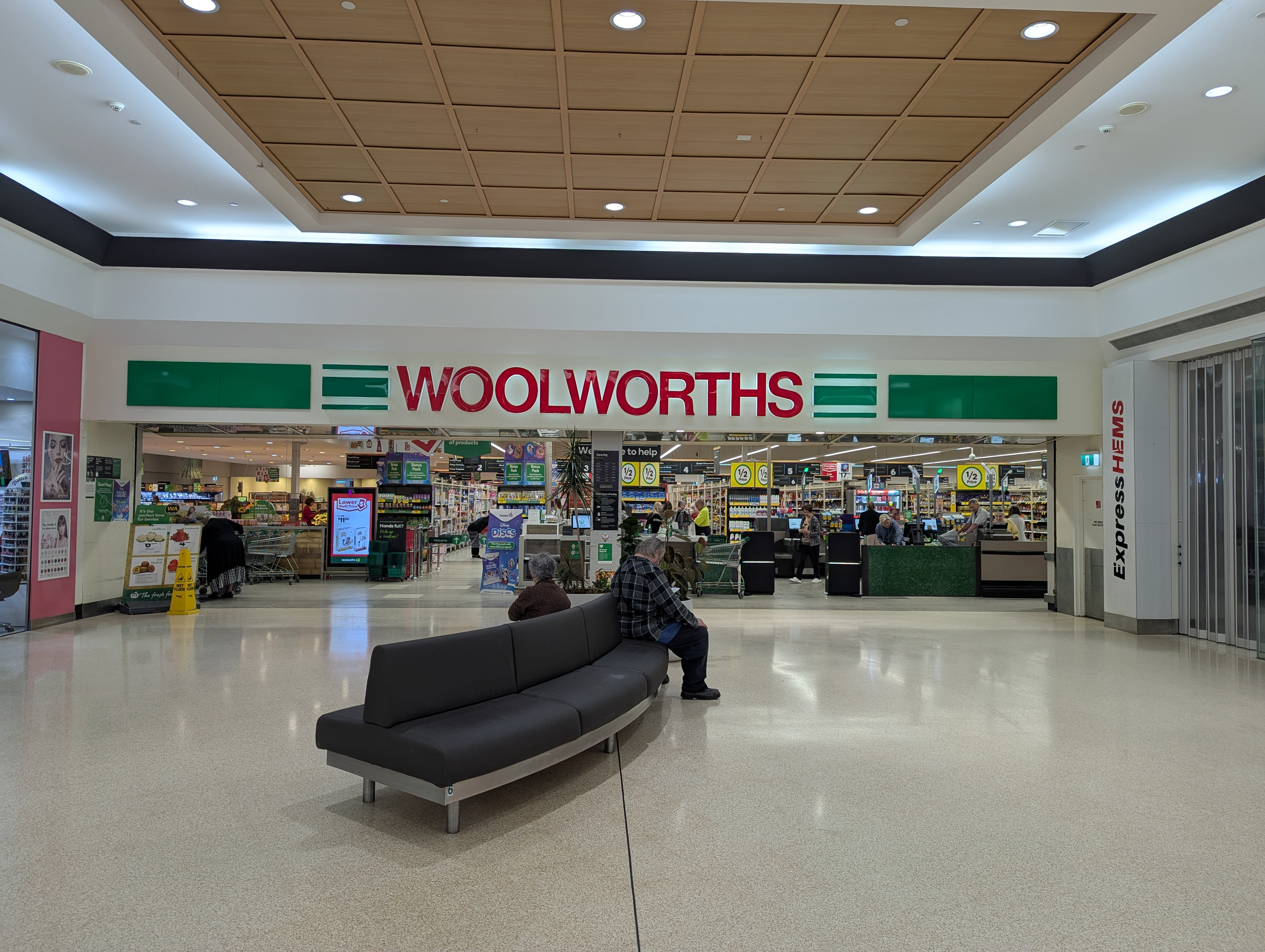
The Woolworths store pictured in August 2025, which notably utilises the pre-2009 Woolworths branding.

At present, the main shopping complex has a floor space of over 72,000 square metres (780,000 sq ft). The entire centre is situated on approximately 300,000 square metres (3,200,000 sq ft) of land. The main shopping complex consists of a long main mall with several wings and side malls. Coles and Woolworths are the two principal supermarkets, while the anchor department stores include Myer, David Jones and discount department store Kmart.

In addition to shopping the main shopping complex, Westfield Booragoon houses:

- an 8-screen Hoyts cinema
- a public library
- several external banking buildings
- an apartment complex (under construction as at 2021)
- another office complex known as Garden City House
- the Melville City Council offices
- a major regional bus station

=== Major precincts ===
The main shopping complex can be broken into several main areas:

- A sky-roof atrium precinct which includes Woolworths (a former Action/Newmart store and the original site of Coles in the centre prior to its relocation to the 'marketplace' precinct in 2000, and its conversion to its $2.71 million replacement of its discount supermarket chain Newmart, and is also one of a handful of Woolies stores in Australia which still have the old 1980s-2000s logo)
- a food court, which leads to the cinema
- a 'marketplace' which includes Coles
- a central 'fashion mall' which includes many boutique outlets
- two diametrically opposite north–south wings leading to David Jones and Myer
- a northern and southern mall parallel to the central mall
- a north–south mall at the eastern end of the centre leading to Kmart

David Jones will close its store by the end of 2026.
