= Wireless Hill Park =

Park in Ardross, Western Australia

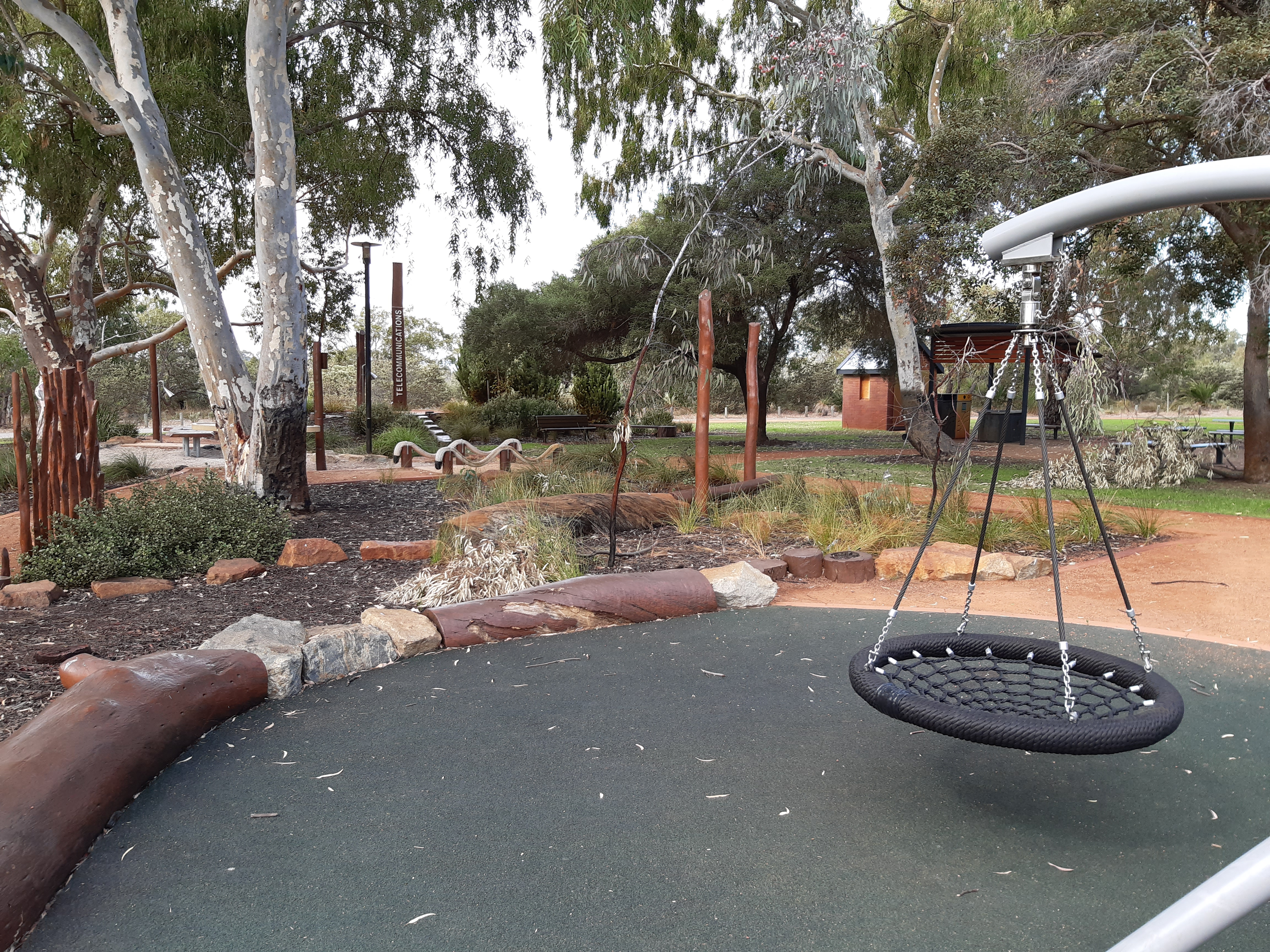
- Playground at Wireless Hill Park
- Interactive map of Wireless Hill Park
- Location: Ardross, Western Australia
- Coordinates: 32°01′45″S 115°49′39″E
- Open

Western Australia Heritage Register
- Designated: 2 September 1997
- Reference no.: 3518

Wireless Hill Park is a 40-hectare (99-acre) park in Ardross, Western Australia that is the location of the former Applecross Wireless Station, (Note: When the station was constructed, the site was in Applecross. Due to subsequent changes to suburban boundaries, the site is now in Ardross.) an early radio station in Western Australia. The station buildings have been preserved and now house the Wireless Hill Museum. The site is listed in the Register of the National Estate and the State Register of Heritage Places.

The park is also a significant urban bushland area.

== History ==
Wireless Hill is on the land of the Beeliar residence group of the Whadjuk Noongar people, who have lived in the area for millennia. They know the area as Yagan Mia.

In 1909, the Commonwealth Government decided that wireless telegraphy stations should be established around the coastline of Australia. The following year, it contracted Australasian Wireless Limited to build the Perth station, at the location now known as Wireless Hill. Clearing of the site and construction began in 1911, with the Applecross Wireless Station completed and officially opened on 30 September 1912.

The Applecross Wireless Station was initially owned and operated by Australasian Wireless, on behalf of the Postmaster-General's Department (PMG), (Note: The Wireless Telegraphy Act 1905 gave the Commonwealth Government the exclusive right to establish and operate radio stations.) as a commercial service for shipping.

In 1916, as a consequence of World War I, the Royal Australian Navy took control of the station (and all Australian coastal radio stations), retaining existing staff and giving them naval ranks as non-commissioned officers. The Navy retained control until 1920. The Navy took control of the station again from 1939 to 1945, during World War II, again retaining the existing staff.

In 1947 the newly formed Overseas Telecommunications Commission (OTC) took control over all wireless stations from the PMG.

Between 1967 and 1968 OTC moved all of its operations from Wireless Hill to its new station in Gnangara, and in 1968 the Wireless Hill station closed. The land was transferred to the City of Melville in 1969, and in 1971 was formally renamed as Wireless Hill Park. (The site was already commonly referred to as Wireless Hill by the local residents.)

In 1970 the West Australian VHF Group (an amateur radio club) proposed establishing a telecommunications museum. In 1974 work began on converting the station, and in 1979 the Wireless Hill Telecommunications Museum was officially opened as a contribution to Western Australia's sesquicentennial celebrations. In 2015, after refurbishment, the museum was re-opened as the Wireless Hill Museum.

Wireless Hill Park was classified by the National Trust of Australia in 1992, and listed on the Western Australian Register of Heritage Places in 1997.

== Telecommunications ==
Wireless Hill Museum
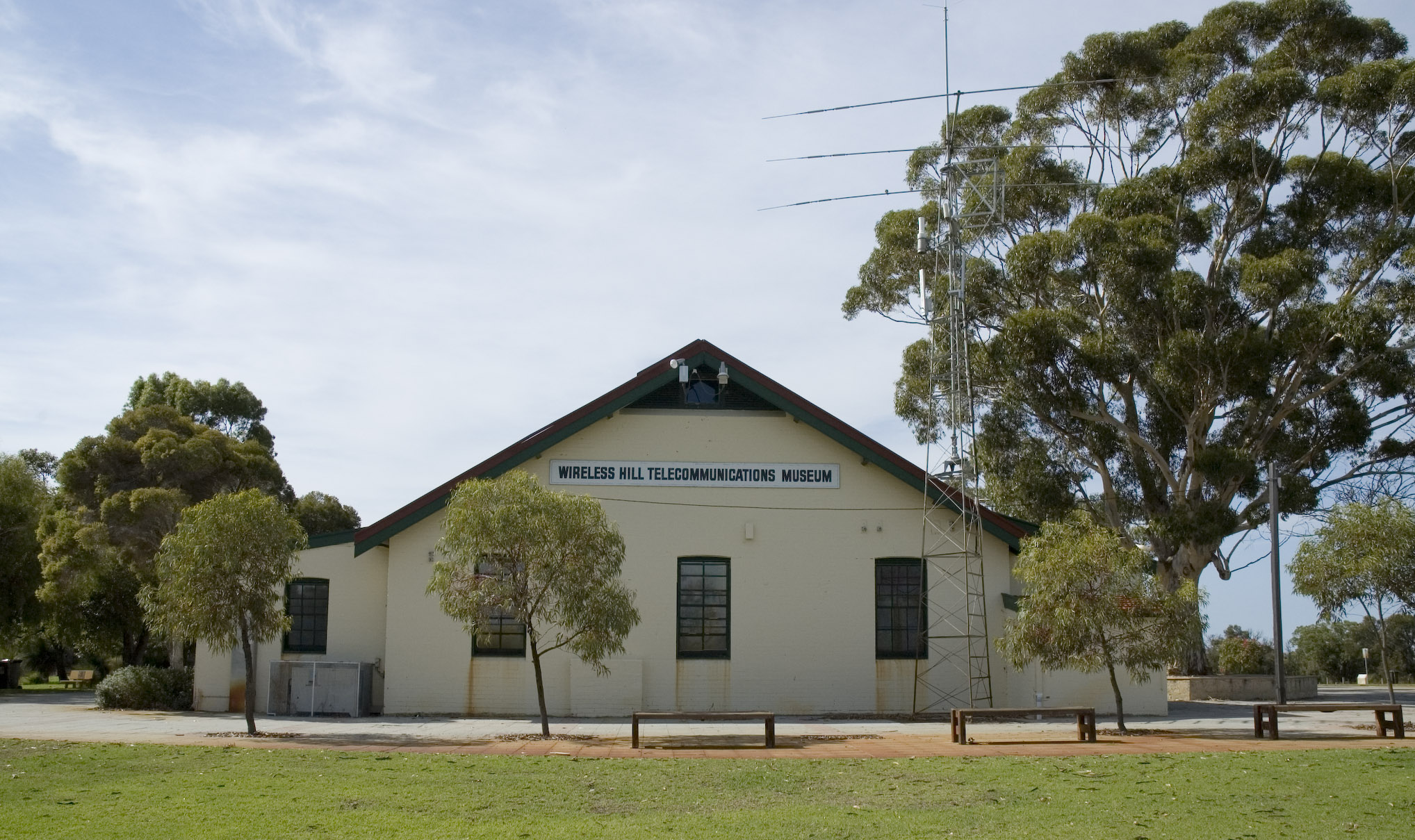
- Wireless Hill Museum, 2006
- Established: 1974; 52 years ago
- Location: Ardross, Western Australia
- Coordinates: 32°01′49″S 115°49′41″E
- Website: www.melvillecity.com.au/things-to-do/museums-arts-and-culture/wireless-hill-museum
- Building details
- Former names: Engine House
- Alternative names: Engine Room

General information
- Groundbreaking: 1911; 115 years ago
- Opened: 30 September 1912; 113 years ago

Western Australia Heritage Register
- Official name: Engine House (fmr)
- Designated: 3 Aug 1992
- Reference no.: 3825

=== Buildings and structures ===
At the top of the hill are three main buildings, originally known as:

- Engine House or Engine Room, built in 1912, originally held the generator used to power the transmitter. In 1942 the generator was removed and the radio equipment was moved into this building, which then became known as the Transmitter Hall.
- Operator's House or Operator's Room, built in 1912, the location of the radio equipment until 1942.
- Stores building, added c. 1915.

Initially, a 120 m (390 ft) antenna mast was erected, held in place by three guy-wires, each attached to a 4.6 m (15 ft) 200-ton concrete anchor block. In 1930 a light was added to the top of the mast, as was required of all structures exceeding 200 ft (61 m), to warn aircraft at night of the mast's existence. The original mast was replaced in 1962 by a 46 m (151 ft) mast, the taller mast no longer being required by the newer technology. The mast was removed in 1967. Previously two of the anchor blocks were used as viewing platforms, however only the north anchor block is now used as a viewing platform.

In 1947 three timber distribution towers were constructed to feed rhombic antennae; these were removed c. 1970.

At the bottom of the hill, on Hickey Street near Canning Highway, four cottages were built as staff accommodation. The road between the cottages and the main station buildings was known as Radio Drive, and was possibly the first macadamised road in Perth.

=== Notable equipment ===
When the station opened in 1912 it used a 25 kW quenched spark-gap transmitter manufactured by Telefunken, and a receiver with a locally built crystal detector (using galena from Northampton). In 1916 the transmitter was upgraded (by the Navy) to a 60 kW Poulsen arc transmitter and vacuum tube receiver.

Initially all radio transmissions used Morse code; the technology to transmit voice was developed in the 1920s, and even then Morse code was still the primary method for long distances up until the station closed in 1968.

In 1927 a shortwave "beam system" was installed, which extended the transmission range sufficiently to allow direct communication between Australia and England.

The original transmitter was powered by diesel-driver alternator. By 1934 the equipment was powered by externally supplied three-phase power, with the generator kept for emergency standby use.

Numerous antennae were added to the site over the years, each for a specific purpose, particularly after OTC took control of the station. In 1960 two rhombic antennae were installed for use with NASA space missions, bringing the total number of antennae up to 22.

=== Radio services ===
The Wireless Hill station provided a variety of radio services during its operational lifetime.

Initially the station was used for communications with shipping. This included transmission of weather forecasts, news bulletins and time signals, sending medical advice to ships with no doctors aboard, and monitoring for distress calls. In 1921 the station exchanged signals with SS Aeneas over a distance of 9,000 kilometres (5,600 mi), the longest distance for any Australian station at the time.

The Wireless Hill station provided the first direct radio communications across the Australian continent, and communicated with bases in the Antarctic, including Mawson Station in the 1950s and 1960s.

The original call sign of the station was POP; by the 1920s it was known as VIP.

During World War I, the station monitored German transmissions, including propaganda from Nauen Transmitter Station in Germany.

Police radio (VK-1) was transmitted from Wireless Hill, operated remotely from police headquarters in Roe Street, Perth. Initially, in the late 1920s, two patrol cars in Perth were equipped with radios.

Western Australia's first commercial radio station, 6PR, was broadcast from Wireless Hill between 1931 and 1950, relayed from a studio in Barrack Street. Western Australia's first television service (TVW7) was broadcast in 1959.

In the 1960s the station provide communications to the US rescue aircraft that flew continuously over the Indian Ocean when NASA were conducting a Mercury mission.

A shortwave antenna was installed in the 1970s, and is still in use by the WA VHF Group.

After Cyclone Tracy hit Darwin in 1975, destroying or disabling much of its communications infrastructure, the WA VHF Group helped provided communications between Darwin and Perth.

In the 1980s an antenna was added to the Stores building, which became the control centre for the State Emergency Service.

Since 2002 Wireless Hill has been home to Capital Community Radio's studios and one of their transmitters.

== Bushland ==
Wireless Hill Park comprises 38 hectares (94 acres) of bushland surrounding 2 hectares (5 acres) of grass parkland. The bushland is home to numerous wildflowers, native plants, birds and reptiles. It is listed as site 336 on "Bush Forever", a state government policy to protect regionally significant bushland.

Much of the area was cleared when the Applecross Wireless Station was originally built or shortly afterwards during World War I for security reasons. Perennial veldtgrass was planted to prevent soil erosion, but the bush has regenerated itself from seeds from plants in surrounding areas.

The park has several walking paths through it.

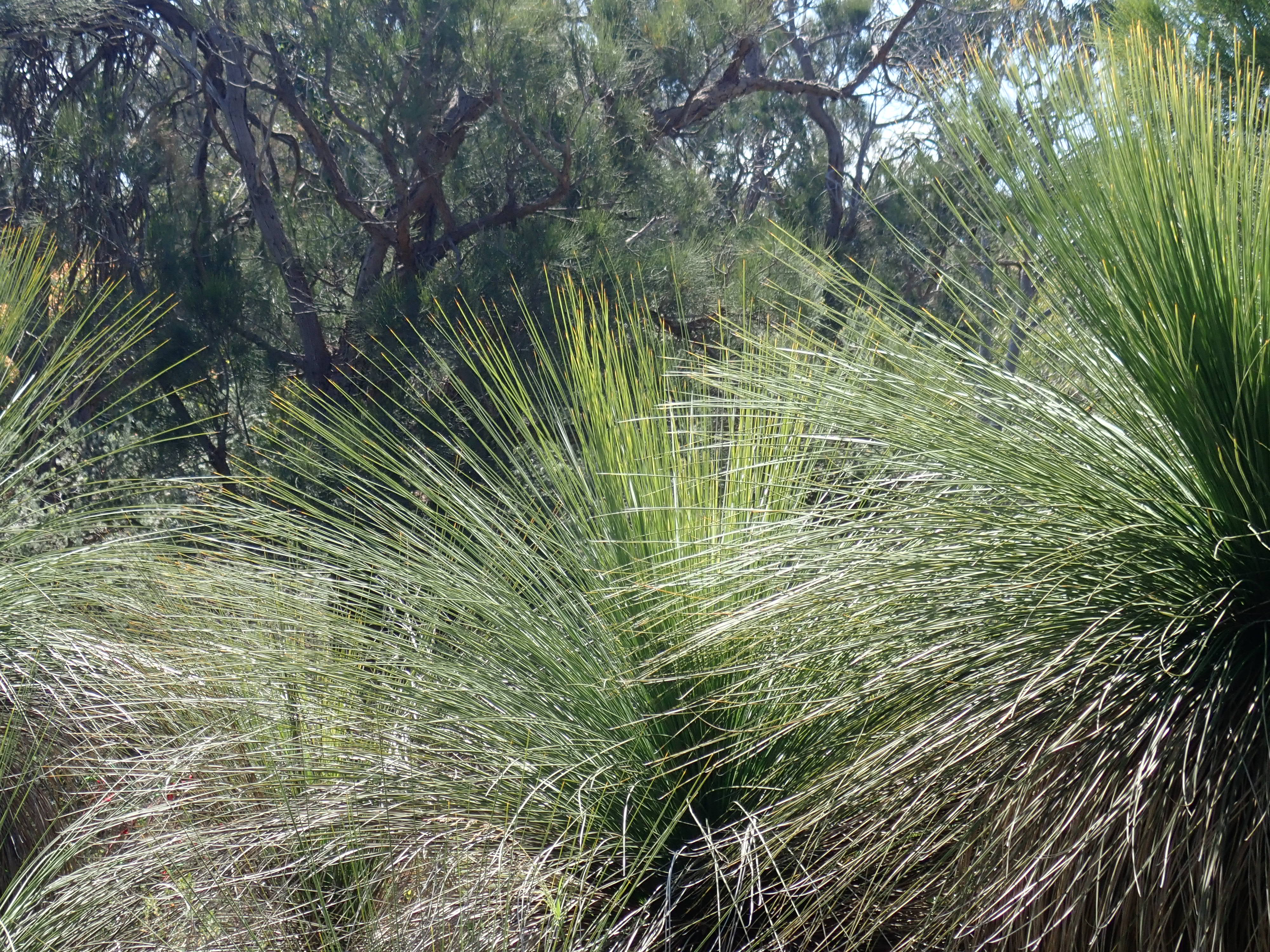
Grass trees

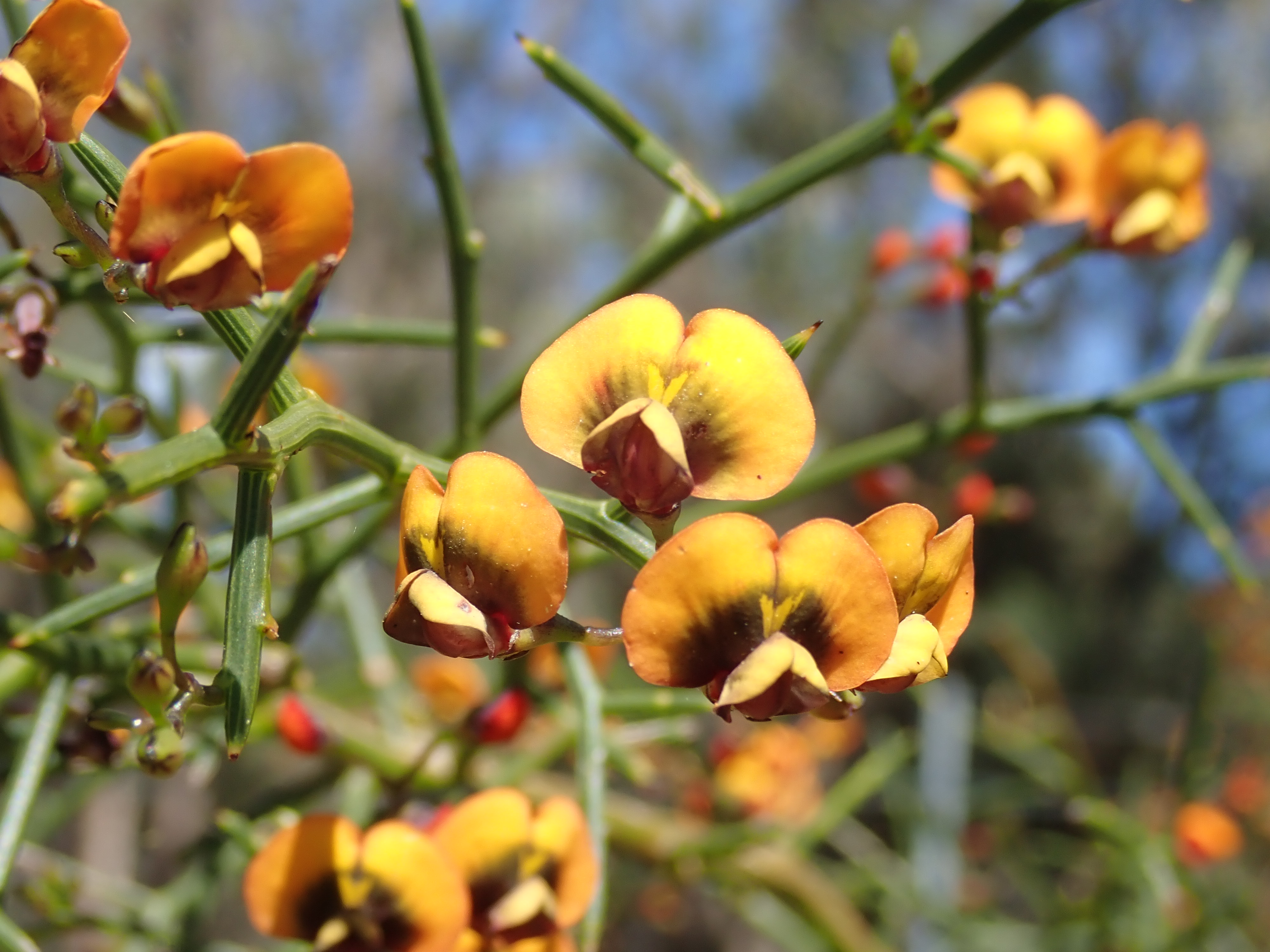
Daviesia triflora

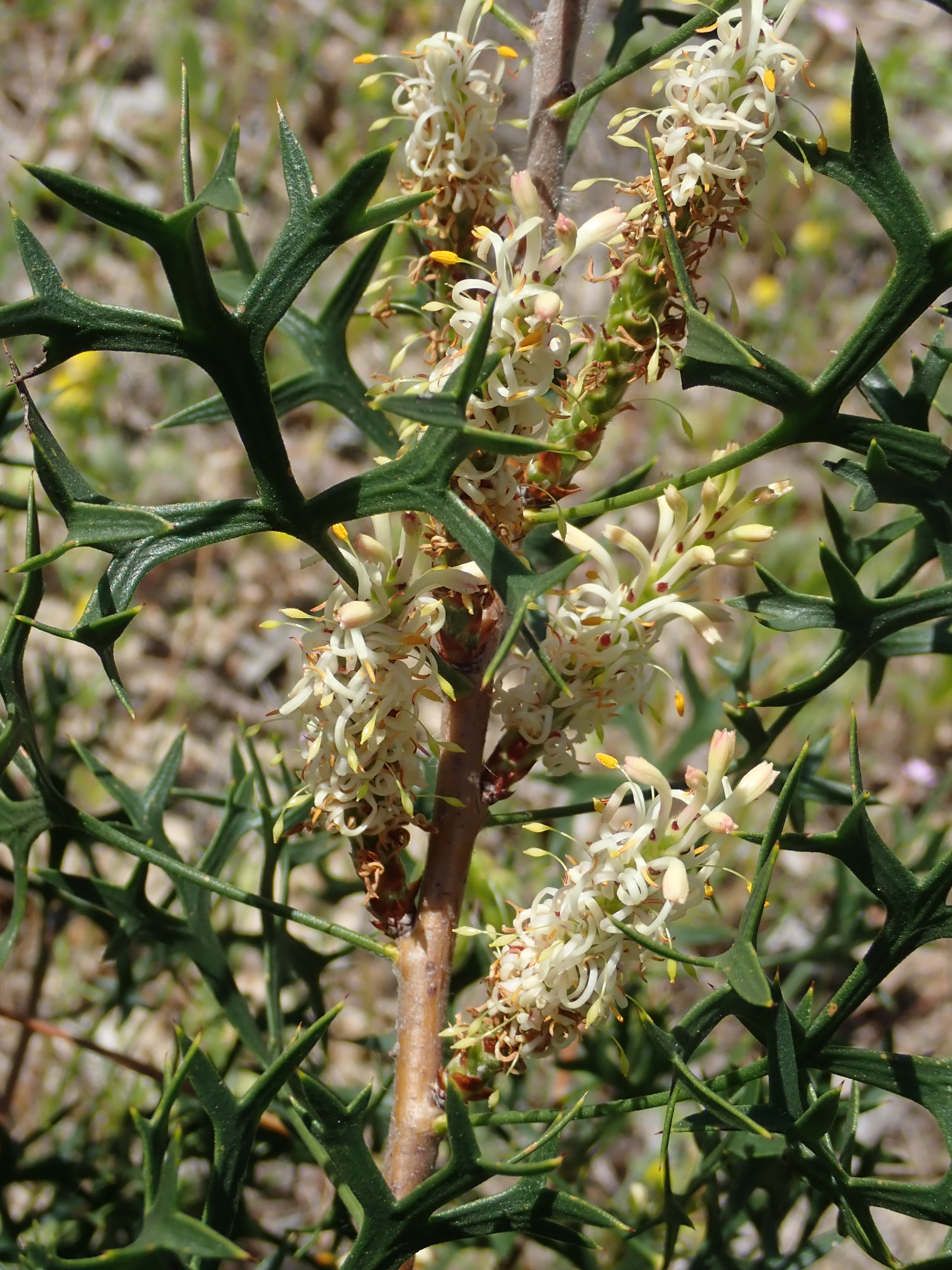
Petrophile macrostachya

== Aboriginal heritage ==
Wireless Hill is on the land of the Beeliar residence group of the Whadjuk Noongar people. It is known to them as Yagan Mia.

Some sources refer to Yagan Mia as Yagan's Lookout, named for the Whadjuk leader Yagan, who used the area as a home base, lookout and vantage point. (Note: According to one sign on the "Yagan's Genunny" walking trail, "This hill was known to be a camping place (mia) and lookout (genunny) of Yagan ...".) According to more recent sources, however, Yaagan means 'turtle' or (western) long-necked turtle, and Yagan Mia means 'home of the long-necked turtle', an important source of food.

The park includes a scarred tree on the southern side.

== See also ==
- Timeline of Australian radio
