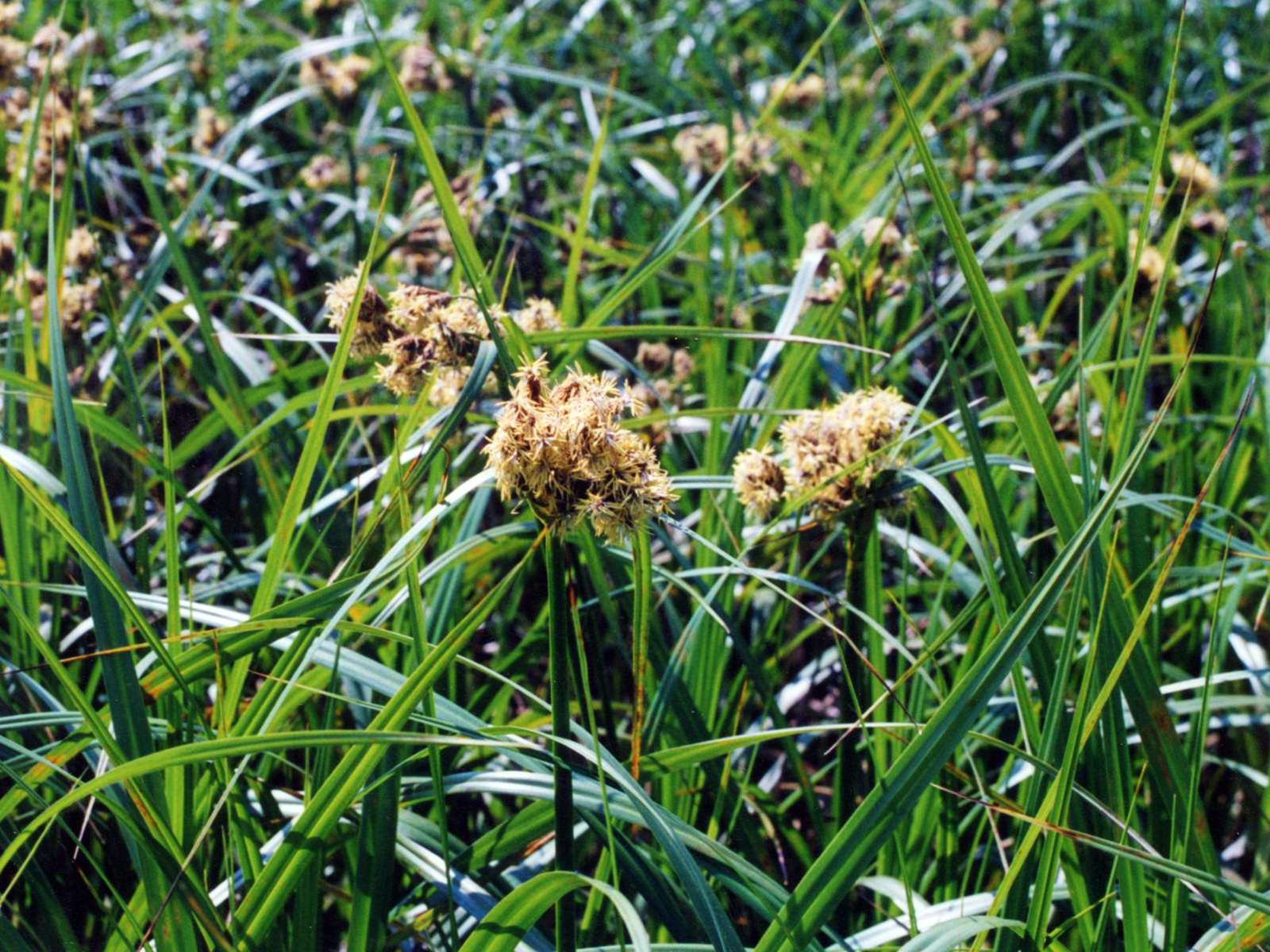
- Scirpus atrovirens

Scientific classification
- Kingdom: Plantae
- Clade: Tracheophytes
- Clade: Angiosperms
- Clade: Monocots
- Clade: Commelinids
- Order: Poales
- Family: Cyperaceae
- Genus: Scirpus; L.

Species
- About 120; see text

Synonyms
- Chamaeschoenus Ehrh.; Leiophyllum Ehrh.; Dichismus Raf.; Diplarinus Raf.; Seidlia Opiz; Actaeogeton Steud.; Blepharolepis Nees; Nemocharis Beurl.; Taphrogiton Montandon; Maximoviczia A.P.Khokhr.; Maximowicziella A.P.Khokhr.

= Scirpus =

Genus of flowering plants

Scirpus is a genus of grass-like species in the sedge family Cyperaceae many with the common names club-rush, wood club-rush or bulrush. They mostly inhabit wetlands and damp locations.

== Description ==
Scirpus are rhizomatous perennial herbs, with 3-angled stems and flat grass-like leaves. The flowers are in clusters of small spikelets, often brown or greenish brown. Some species (e.g. S. lacustris) can reach a height of 3 metres (10 feet), while S. sylvaticus is about 1.2 m (4 ft) and others, such as S. supinus, are much smaller, only reaching 20–30 centimetres (8–12 in) tall.

== Taxonomy ==
The taxonomy of the genus is complex, and under review by botanists. Recent studies by taxonomists of the Cyperaceae have resulted in the creation of several new genera, including the genera Schoenoplectus and Bolboschoenus; others (including Blysmus, Isolepis, Nomochloa, and Scirpoides) have also been used. At one point this genus held almost 300 species, but many of the species once assigned to it have now been reassigned, and it now holds an estimated 120 species.

=== Selected species ===
(This list is incomplete, and may include some species now assigned to other genera.)

- Scirpus ancistrochaetus northeastern bulrush
- Scirpus atrocinctus black-girdle bulrush
- Scirpus atrovirens woolgrass bulrush
- Scirpus bicolor
- Scirpus campestris salt marsh bulrush
- Scirpus cespitosus deergrass, synonymous with Trichophorum cespitosum
- Scirpus congdonii Congdon's bulrush
- Scirpus cyperinus - woolgrass/cottongrass bulrush
- Scirpus diffusus
- Scirpus divaricatus spreading bulrush
- Scirpus expansus Woodland beakrush
- Scirpus flaccidifolius reclining bulrush
- Scirpus fluitans floating club-rush
- Scirpus fluviatilis - river bulrush
- Scirpus georgianus Georgia bulrush
- Scirpus grossus Greater club-rush, Giant bulrush
- Scirpus hattorianus - mosquito bulrush
- Scirpus lineatus drooping bulrush
- Scirpus longii Long's bulrush
- Scirpus mariqueter
- Scirpus microcarpus small-fruit bulrush
- Scirpus mucronatus
- Scirpus nevadensis Nevada bulrush
- Scirpus olneyi Olney bulrush, synonymous with Schoenoplectus americanus
- Scirpus pacificus Pacific Coast bulrush
- Scirpus pallidus pale bulrush
- Scirpus paludosus salt marsh bulrush
- Scirpus pedicellatus stalked bulrush
- Scirpus pendulus pendulous bulrush
- Scirpus polyphyllus leafy bulrush
- Scirpus pumilus dwarf deergrass
- Scirpus pungens sharp club-rush
- Scirpus radicans
- Scirpus robustus salt marsh bulrush
- Scirpus supinus dwarf club-rush
- Scirpus sylvaticus wood club-rush
- Scirpus triqueter triangular club-rush

Selected species in a broader view of the genus

- Bolboschoenus maritimus sea club-rush
- Isolepis cernua slender club-rush
- Isolepis setacea bristle club-rush
- Schoenoplectus acutus tule
- Schoenoplectus hudsonianus alpine deergrass
- Schoenoplectus lacustris common club-rush
- Schoenoplectus tabernaemontani
- Scirpoides holoschoenus round-headed club-rush

=== Fossil record ===
Several hundred fossil fruits of Scirpus ragozinii have been described from middle Miocene strata of the Fasterholt area near Silkeborg in Central Jutland, Denmark. Thirty-five fossil fruits of the extant Scirpus sylvaticus have been extracted from borehole samples of the Middle Miocene fresh water deposits in Nowy Sacz Basin, West Carpathians, Poland.

== Distribution and habitat ==
The genus has a nearly cosmopolitan distribution, found on every continent except Africa and Antarctica.

Many species are common in wetlands and can produce dense stands of vegetation, along rivers, in coastal deltas and in ponds and potholes. Although flooding is the most important factor affecting its distribution, drought, ice scour, grazing, fire and salinity also affect its abundance. It can survive unfavourable conditions like prolonged flooding, or drought, as buried seeds.

== Ecology ==
Scirpus species are used as food plants by the larvae of some Lepidoptera species, including Chedra microstigma and Scirpophaga nivella. They provide habitat for other wildlife.

Scirpus plants play a vital role in wetland ecosystems by stabilizing soil and reducing erosion. Their dense root systems help filter water and improve its quality.

== Uses ==
Scirpus species are often planted to inhibit soil erosion. They are also used in some herbal remedies; the plant's rhizomes are collected in the autumn and winter and dried in the sun before use.

== Sources ==
- Muntz, Philip A. A California Flora. Berkeley, CA: University of California Press, 1973, copyright 1959
- Muntz, Philip A. A California Flora: Supplement. Berkeley, CA: University of California Press, 1976 (Scirpus lacutris, validus, glaucus, p. 183))
