= Bulrush =

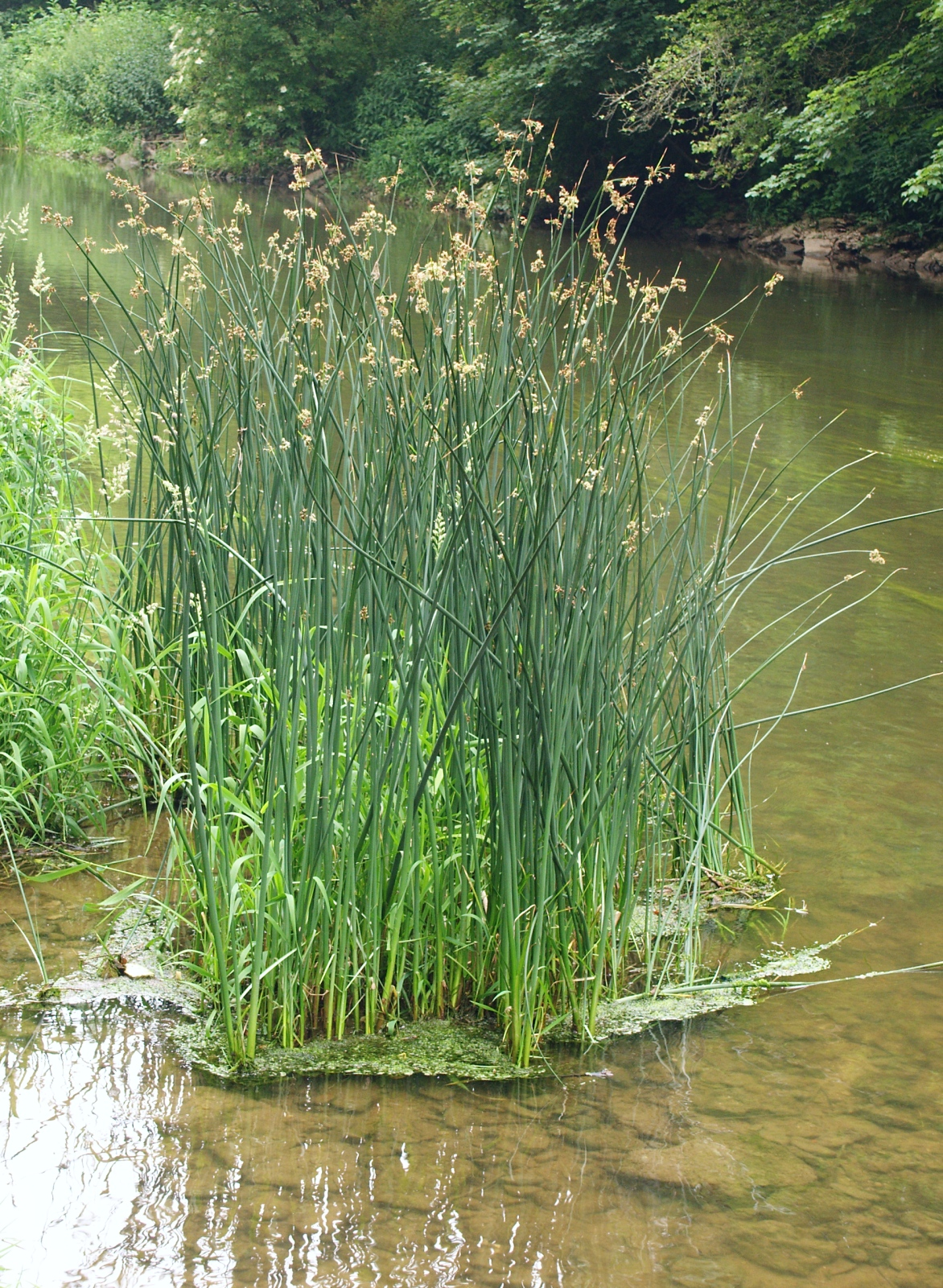
Example of the bulrush genus Schoenoplectus.

Bulrush is a vernacular name for several large wetland grass-like plants.

- Sedge family (Cyperaceae):
  - Cyperus
  - Scirpus
  - Blysmus
  - Bolboschoenus
  - Scirpoides
  - Isolepis
  - Schoenoplectus
  - Trichophorum
- Typhaceae:
  - Typha

== See also ==
- Rushes (Juncaceae)
