= Elachista madarella =

Scientific classification
- Kingdom: Animalia
- Phylum: Arthropoda
- Clade: Pancrustacea
- Class: Insecta
- Order: Lepidoptera
- Family: Elachistidae
- Genus: Elachista
- Species: E. madarella

Binomial name
- Elachista madarella (Clemens, 1860)

Synonyms
- Cosmiotis madarella Clemens, 1860

Species of moth

Elachista madarella is a moth of the family Elachistidae. It is found in North America, where it has been recorded from Illinois, Indiana, Maine, Massachusetts, New Hampshire, New Jersey, New York, Ohio, Ontario and Pennsylvania.

The wingspan is 8–9 mm. Adults have been recorded on wing from May to October.

The larvae feed on Carex pubescens, Carex cristata and Scirpus atrovirens. They mine the leaves of their host plant. Larvae can be found in early spring. Pupation takes place on the upper side of a leaf over the midrib.
