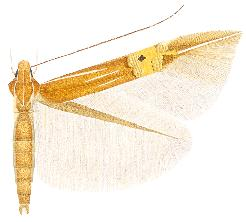

Scientific classification
- Kingdom: Animalia
- Phylum: Arthropoda
- Clade: Pancrustacea
- Class: Insecta
- Order: Lepidoptera
- Family: Cosmopterigidae
- Genus: Cosmopterix
- Species: C. scirpicola

Binomial name
- Cosmopterix scirpicola Hodges, 1962

= Cosmopterix scirpicola =

Species of moth

Cosmopterix scirpicola is a moth of the family Cosmopterigidae. It is known from the United States, where found from Maryland and eastern Wyoming to Florida, south-western Louisiana and California. It has also been recorded from Alabama.

== Description ==
Male, female. Forewing length 4.8-4.9 mm. Head: frons shining ochreous-white with greenish and reddish reflections, vertex and neck tufts shining ochreous-brown with reddish gloss, medially and laterally lined white, collar ochreous-brown; labial palpus first segment very short, white, second segment four-fifths of the length of third, ochreous-grey, laterally and ventrally lined white, third segment white, lined dark brown laterally; scape dorsally dark brown with anterior and dorsal white lines, white ventrally, antenna dark brown, a short, often interrupted, white line from base, followed towards apex by a dark brown section to two-thirds, one or two ochreous-grey segments, two or three dark brown, one ochreous-grey, ten dark brown, one ochreous-grey and seven dark brown segments at apex. Thorax and tegulae ochreous-brown with reddish gloss, thorax with a white median line, tegulae lined white inwardly. Legs: foreleg dark brown with a white line on tibia and tarsal segments one to three and five, femora of midleg and hindleg shining pale ochreous, tibiae and tarsal segments ochreous-grey, tibia of midleg with white oblique basal and medial streaks and a white apical ring, tarsal segments one and two with whitish apical rings, segment five entirely white, tibia of hindleg as midleg, tarsal segment one with whitish basal and apical rings, segments two to four with whitish apical rings and segment five entirely white, spurs shining white dorsally, dark grey ventrally. Forewing ochreous-brown, apical area often dark brown, four white lines in the basal area, a subcostal from base to two-fifths, gradually bending from costa, a short and straight medial above fold, from about one-fifth to beyond the distal end of the subcostal, a subdorsal below fold, about as long as the medial but slightly further from base, a dorsal from beyond base to the start of the subdorsal, a rather narrow orange-yellow transverse fascia beyond the middle, slightly narrowing towards dorsum with a narrow apical protrusion, bordered at the inner edge by two pale golden metallic tubercular subcostal and subdorsal spots, the subcostal spot about one and a half time as large as the subdorsal, both spots may join in the middle of the wing and are inwardly lined dark brown, the subcostal spot with a patch of blackish scales on the outside, bordered at the outer edge by two pale golden metallic tubercular costal and dorsal spots, the dorsal spot about twice as large as the costal and more towards base, both spots edged dark brown on the inside, a whitish costal streak beyond the outer costal spot, a shining white apical line, edged dark brown, from the apical protrusion, cilia ochreous around apex, ochreous-grey towards dorsum. Hindwing shining grey, cilia ochreous-grey. Underside: forewing shining greyish brown, the apical line indistinctly visible, hindwing shining grey. Abdomen dorsally ochreous, mixed brownish grey, segments banded greyish posteriorly, ventrally ochreous-grey with a yellowish white longitudinal streak, segments broadly banded yellowish white posteriorly, anal tuft brownish grey in male, white in female.

== Biology ==
The larvae feed on Scirpus species. They mine in the stems of their host plant. Adults are on wing in June and July in the north, from late March to early June in Florida, in May and June in Louisiana and in late August in California. The species is probably bivoltine.
