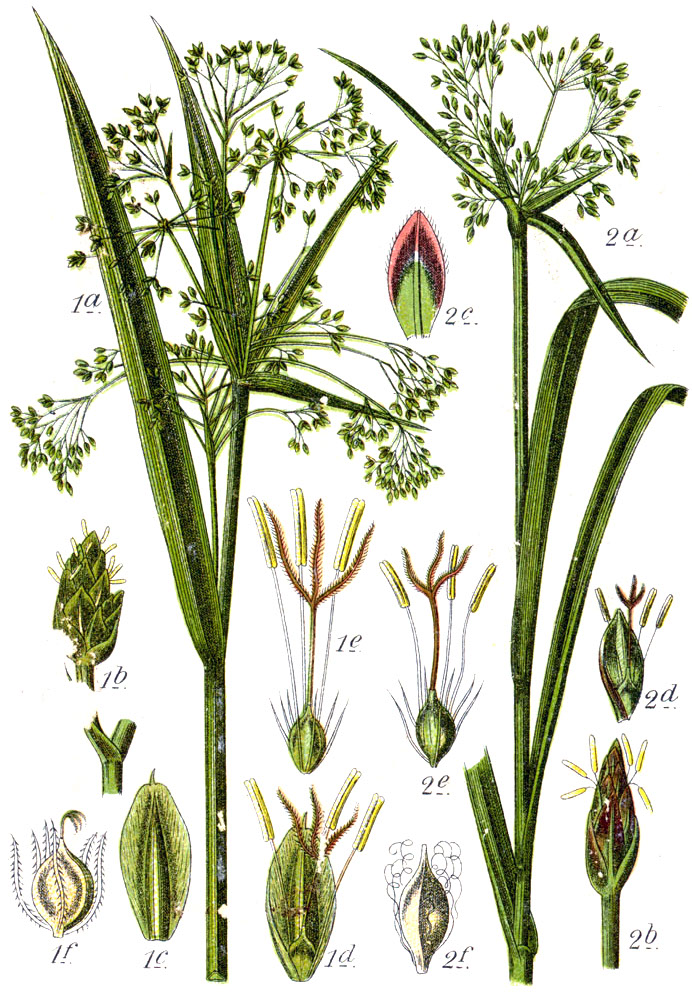
- Scirpus radicans (left), Scirpus sylvaticus (right), from book plate, 1796

Scientific classification
- Kingdom: Plantae
- Clade: Tracheophytes
- Clade: Angiosperms
- Clade: Monocots
- Clade: Commelinids
- Order: Poales
- Family: Cyperaceae
- Genus: Scirpus
- Species: S. radicans

Binomial name
- Scirpus radicans Schkuhr

= Scirpus radicans =

Species of grass-like plant

Scirpus radicans is a species of flowering plant belonging to the family Cyperaceae.

Its native range is Europe to Japan.

== Description ==
Perennial herb 60–125(150) cm tall. Rhizome short. Stems with long lateral shoots that bend in an arc to the soil and root at the top. Leaves up to 2 cm wide, flat. Perianth setae 2–3 times longer than the nut, sinuous, almost smooth. Spikelets pointed, lanceolate, blackish, 5–8 mm long, sitting 1 at the ends of smooth branches of a spreading paniculate inflorescence 10–20 cm long. Spikelets oblong-ovate to narrowly ovate, 5–8 × ≈ 2 mm, abundantly flowered. Spike scales densely arranged, oblong, ≈ 2 mm, membranous, both surfaces dark grayish-black, midrib pale yellow, base sometimes straw-colored, margins at apex ciliate, apex rounded. Anthers ≈ 1 mm, linear-oblong. Nut pale yellow, obovate, ≈ 1 mm, compressed on 3 sides. 2n = 56.
