= Pentagramma vittatifrons =

Scientific classification
- Domain: Eukaryota
- Kingdom: Animalia
- Phylum: Arthropoda
- Class: Insecta
- Order: Hemiptera
- Suborder: Auchenorrhyncha
- Infraorder: Fulgoromorpha
- Family: Delphacidae
- Genus: Pentagramma
- Species: P. vittatifrons

Binomial name
- Pentagramma vittatifrons (Uhler, 1876)

Species of planthopper

Pentagramma vittatifrons is a species of delphacid planthopper in the family Delphacidae. It is found in North America. It feeds on the plant Schoenoplectus pungens.
