= Scirpus diffusus =

Scientific classification
- Kingdom: Plantae
- Clade: Tracheophytes
- Clade: Angiosperms
- Clade: Monocots
- Clade: Commelinids
- Order: Poales
- Family: Cyperaceae
- Genus: Scirpus
- Species: S. diffusus

Binomial name
- Scirpus diffusus Schuyler

Species of grass-like plant

Scirpus diffusus is a species of flowering plant in the sedge family known by the common name umbrella bulrush. It is endemic to California, where it can be found in several of the high mountain ranges from the Klamath Mountains to the Sierra Nevada. It grows in wetland habitat and other moist areas, such as mountain meadows. It is similar to Scirpus congdonii and was described from herbarium specimens once mislabeled as such. It is a perennial herb forming a clump of erect stems growing up to a meter tall, solitary stems sometimes occurring as well. The stems are three-angled and narrow at the middle. Sheathing leaves occur at the stem bases as well as higher up the stems. The inflorescence occurs at the end of the stem, with small additional ones growing from the uppermost leaf axial. The inflorescence consists of several clusters of many spikelets wrapped at the bases in a leaflike bract.
