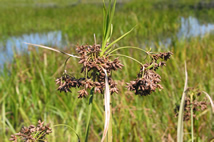

Conservation status
- Near Threatened (IUCN 3.1)

- Endangered (ESA)

Scientific classification
- Kingdom: Plantae
- Clade: Tracheophytes
- Clade: Angiosperms
- Clade: Monocots
- Clade: Commelinids
- Order: Poales
- Family: Cyperaceae
- Genus: Scirpus
- Species: S. ancistrochaetus

Binomial name
- Scirpus ancistrochaetus Schuyler

= Scirpus ancistrochaetus =

Species of grass-like plant

Scirpus ancistrochaetus is a rare species of flowering plant in the sedge family known by the common names barbedbristle bulrush and northeastern bulrush. It is native to the northeastern United States, from New Hampshire south to Virginia. It used to be found in Quebec but it is now thought to be extirpated there. It was also believed to be extirpated from the state of New York, but at least one population has been rediscovered in Steuben County in 2010. It is threatened by the loss and degradation of its wetland habitat. It is a federally listed endangered species.

This bulrush produces clumps of upright or leaning stems from a fibrous rhizome. The stems sometimes have axillary bulblets. The leaves are up to 68 cm long and are only about 1 cm wide. The inflorescences occur at the tips of the stems and sometimes from the uppermost leaf axil on the side of each stem. Each is made up of clusters of spikelets that are oval in shape and up to 0.5 cm long. They are covered in brown scales with green midribs. The flowers emerge from beneath the scales and the plant can be identified by the straight or curving toothed spines on the developing fruit. Germination occurs around March and seedlings grow from the rhizomes in May. Flowering occurs in June and July and the fruits develop in July through September. This bulrush sometimes hybridizes with Scirpus hattorianus.

This plant grows in a number of types of wetlands, especially those with variable water depths. These include beaver ponds that are shallow or deep, depending on the activity of beavers, sandy depressions and sinkholes that sometimes fill with groundwater, and sinkhole ponds in solid sandstone bedrock. The latter is the most common type of habitat in the southern portion of its range. Sinkhole ponds usually fill with water in the spring and dry out during the summer, but their hydrology is variable. The bulrush grows at the water's edge, sometimes in a small amount of standing water, but it can be found away from the water or in deeper water up to about a depth of 90 cm. It has been observed experimentally that changes in water level affect the growth of the plant. The most common plant associates are threeway sedge (Dulichium arundinaceum), woolgrass (Scirpus cyperinus sens. lat.), rattlesnake mannagrass (Glyceria canadensis), and Virginia marsh St. Johns wort (Triadenum virginicum). Other plants in the habitat include American winterberry (Ilex verticillata), blue skullcap (Scutellaria lateriflora), dogbane (Apocynum sp.), swamp rose (Rosa palustris), lowbush blueberry (Vaccinium angustifolium), red maple (Acer rubrum), black gum (Nyssa sylvatica), white oak (Quercus alba), eastern white pine (Pinus strobus), yellow water lily (Nuphar advena), buttonwillow (Cephalanthus occidentalis), duckweed (Lemna minor), silvery sedge (Carex canescens), blister sedge (Carex vesicaria), tussock sedge (Carex stricta), squarestem spikerush (Eleocharis quadrangulata), cinnamon fern (Osmundastrum cinnamomeum), rice cutgrass (Leersia oryzoides), water knotweed (Persicaria amphibia), and water parsnip (Sium suave).

The bulrush is threatened by the destruction and degradation of its habitat. This includes outright destruction as the land is cleared for development. It also includes damage to the habitat from road construction and maintenance, fire suppression activities, maintenance of power lines and other utilities, hydrocarbon development, and all-terrain vehicle use. The plant is affected by changes in the hydrology of its wetland habitat, including agricultural runoff and other surface water runoff contamination and dredging. Natural threats include beaver activity at beaver pond populations and trampling and browsing by larger animals such as deer.

As of 2007 there were about 113 known populations of this species, about half of them in decline.
