= Hen-allt Common =

Protected area in Powys, Wales

Comin Hen-allt
- Site of Special Scientific Interest
- Location within Wales
- Location of Comin Hen-allt.
- Area of search: Wales
- Grid reference: SO2338039952
- Coordinates: 52.052636°N 3.1187951°W
- Interest: Biological
- Area: 11.43 ha (28.2 acres)
- Notification date: 16 January 1991

Hen-allt Common is a Site of Special Scientific Interest in Brecknock, Powys, Wales. Its special features include unimproved grassland, Flat-sedge Blysmus compressus and Meadow saffron Colchicum autumnale.

== See also ==
- List of Sites of Special Scientific Interest in Brecknock
