= Elachista enitescens =

Scientific classification
- Kingdom: Animalia
- Phylum: Arthropoda
- Clade: Pancrustacea
- Class: Insecta
- Order: Lepidoptera
- Family: Elachistidae
- Genus: Elachista
- Species: E. enitescens

Binomial name
- Elachista enitescens Braun, 1921

Species of moth

Elachista enitescens is a moth of the family Elachistidae. It is found in the United States, where it has been recorded from Ohio and Maine.

The wingspan is 7–8 mm. Adults have been recorded on wing from April to August.

The larvae feed on Scirpus atrovirens. They mine the leaves of their host plant. Mining larvae can be found in March and early April.
