= Copicerus =

Scientific classification
- Domain: Eukaryota
- Kingdom: Animalia
- Phylum: Arthropoda
- Class: Insecta
- Order: Hemiptera
- Suborder: Auchenorrhyncha
- Infraorder: Fulgoromorpha
- Family: Delphacidae
- Subfamily: Asiracinae
- Genus: Copicerus; Swartz, 1802

Species
- See text

Synonyms
- Holotus uérin-Méneville, 1856; Jerala Walker, 1858; Jeralia Walker, 1858 (misspelling of Jerala)

Genus of planthoppers

Copicerus is a genus of delphacid planthoppers in the family Delphacidae. There are at least four described species in Copicerus.

== Species ==
These four species belong to the genus Copicerus:

- Copicerus insignicornis (Lethierry, 1890)
- Copicerus irroratus Swartz, 1802
- Copicerus obscurus (Guérin-Méneville, 1856)
- Copicerus swartzi Stål, 1857
