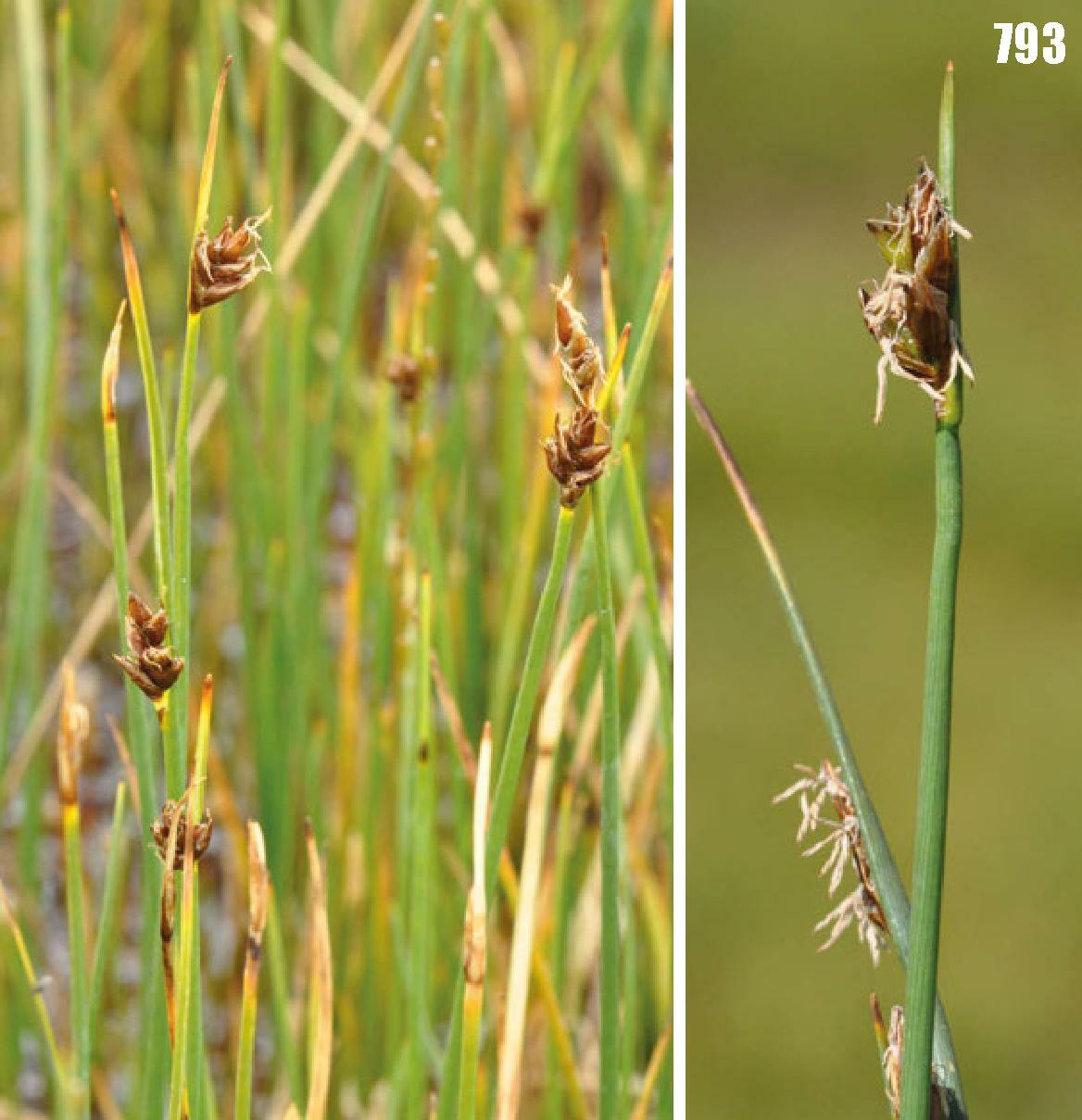

Scientific classification
- Kingdom: Plantae
- Clade: Tracheophytes
- Clade: Angiosperms
- Clade: Monocots
- Clade: Commelinids
- Order: Poales
- Family: Cyperaceae
- Genus: Blysmus
- Species: B. rufus

Binomial name
- Blysmus rufus (Huds.) Link

= Blysmus rufus =

Species of grass-like plant

Blysmus rufus is a species of sedge belonging to the family Cyperaceae.

Its native range is Europe to Mongolia, Subarctic America to Canada.
