= Pentagramma (planthopper) =

Scientific classification
- Domain: Eukaryota
- Kingdom: Animalia
- Phylum: Arthropoda
- Class: Insecta
- Order: Hemiptera
- Suborder: Auchenorrhyncha
- Infraorder: Fulgoromorpha
- Family: Delphacidae
- Subfamily: Asiracinae
- Genus: Pentagramma; Van Duzee, 1897

Genus of planthoppers

Pentagramma is a genus of delphacid planthoppers in the family Delphacidae. There are about nine described species in Pentagramma.

== Species ==
These nine species belong to the genus Pentagramma:

- Pentagramma bivittata Crawford, 1914^{i c g b}
- Pentagramma cosquina Penner, 1947^{i c g}
- Pentagramma douglasensis Penner, 1947^{i c g}
- Pentagramma longistylata Penner, 1947^{i c g}
- Pentagramma lueri Campodonico, 2017^{c g}
- Pentagramma nigrifrons Muir, 1934^{i c g}
- Pentagramma nimbata (Berg, 1879)^{i c g}
- Pentagramma variegata Penner, 1947^{i b}
- Pentagramma vittatifrons (Uhler, 1876)^{i c g b}

Data sources: i = ITIS, c = Catalogue of Life, g = GBIF, b = Bugguide.net
