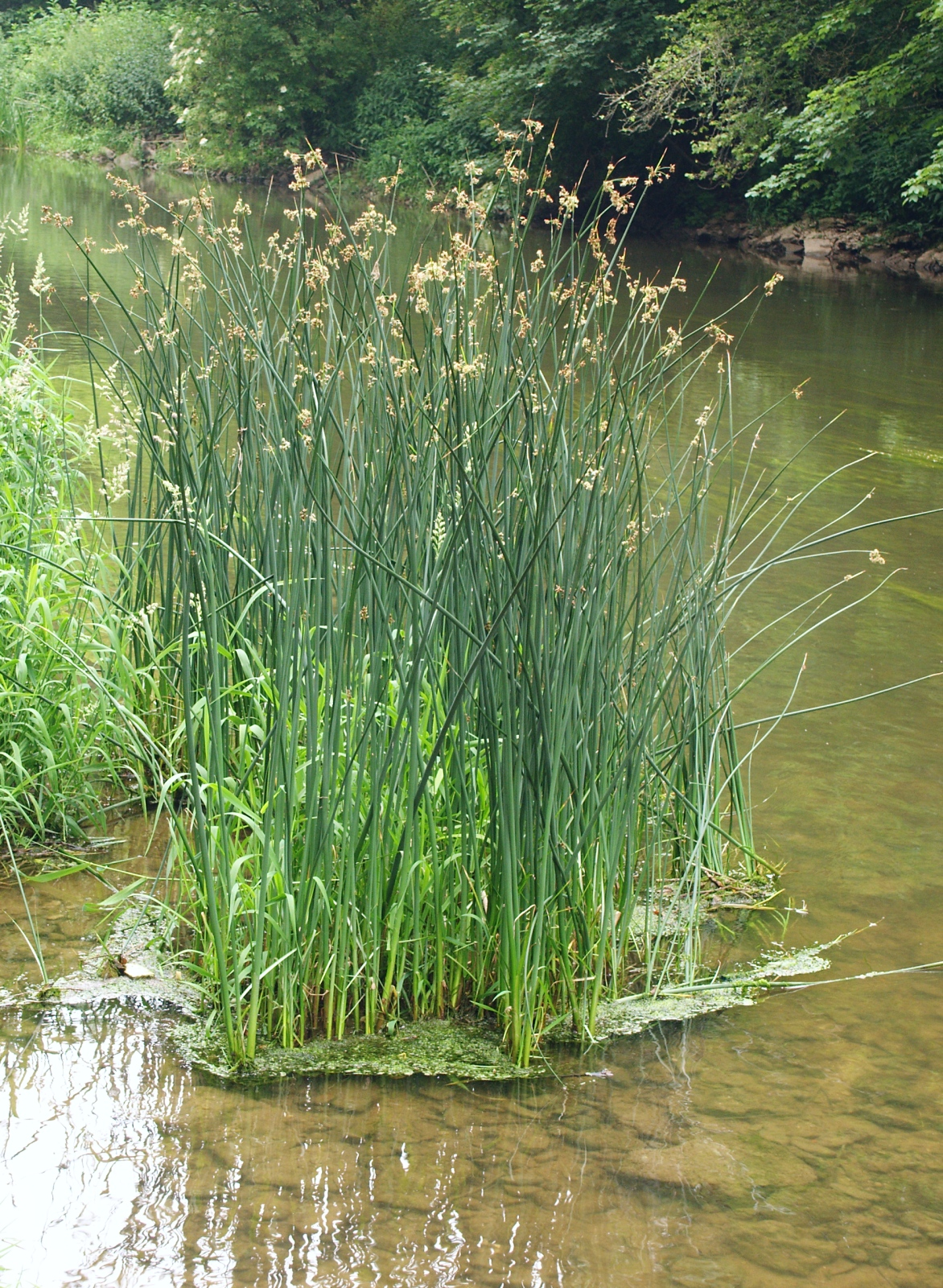
- Common club-rush (Schoenoplectus lacustris)

Scientific classification
- Kingdom: Plantae
- Clade: Tracheophytes
- Clade: Angiosperms
- Clade: Monocots
- Clade: Commelinids
- Order: Poales
- Family: Cyperaceae
- Genus: Schoenoplectus (Rchb.) Palla

Synonyms
- Heleophylax P.Beauv. ex Lestib.; Pterolepis Schrad.; Heleogiton Schult.; Elytrospermum C.A.Mey.; Malacochaete Nees; Pterygolepis Rchb.

= Schoenoplectus =

Genus of plants

Schoenoplectus (club-rush [Old World species], bulrush or tule [New World species]) is a genus of plants in the sedge family with a cosmopolitan distribution. Note that the name bulrush is also applied to species in the unrelated genus Typha as well as to other sedges. The genus Schoenoplectus was formerly considered part of Scirpus, but recent phylogenetic data shows that they are not closely related.

== Species ==
The 34 species accepted:

- Schoenoplectus acutus (Muhl. ex J.M.Bigelow) Á.Löve & D.Löve – Tule – Canada, much of the United States; northern and central Mexico as far south as Michoacán; Clipperton Island.
- Schoenoplectus americanus (Pers.) Volkart ex Schinz & R. Keller – Chairmaker's bulrush, Olney's bulrush – Much of Western Hemisphere from Alaska to Argentina including West Indies; also New Zealand
- Schoenoplectus annamicus (Raymond) T.Koyama – Vietnam
- Schoenoplectus californicus (C.A.Mey.) Steud. – California bulrush, giant bulrush (Americas) – southern United States; California, Oregon; West Indies; Latin America from Mexico to Chile and Argentina; Falkland Islands; Easter Island
- Schoenoplectus × carinatus (Sm.) Palla – Great Britain, Germany, Netherlands, Italy, Central Asia, Himalayas (hybrid S. lacustris × S. triqueter)
- Schoenoplectus confusus (N.E.Br.) Lye – eastern and southern Africa
- Schoenoplectus × contortus (Eames) S.G.Sm. – widely scattered locations in United States (hybrid S. americanus × S. pungens)
- Schoenoplectus corymbosus (Roth ex Roem. & Schult.) J.Raynal in B.Peyre de Fabregues & J.P.Lebrun – widespread across much of Africa; Spain, Saudi Arabia, Yemen, India, Pakistan
- Schoenoplectus decipiens (Nees) J.Raynal – southern Africa
- Schoenoplectus deltarum (Schuyler) Soják – widely scattered locations in southern and central United States
- Schoenoplectus ehrenbergii (Boeckeler) Soják – European Russia, Gansu, Hebei, Ningxia, Shandong, Xinjiang, Kazakhstan
- Schoenoplectus etuberculatus (Steud.) Soják – southeastern United States from Delaware to Texas – isolated populations in Missouri and Rhode Island
- Schoenoplectus halophilus Papch. & Laktionov – southern European Russia
- Schoenoplectus heptangularis Cabezas & Jim.Mejías – Bioko
- Schoenoplectus heterochaetus (Chase) Soják – Slender bulrush – Canada; northern and central United States, California
- Schoenoplectus × kuekenthalianus (Junge) D.H.Kent – Great Britain; Ontario, Quebec, Oregon, Minnesota, New York, Vermont (hybrid S. tabernaemontana × S. triqueter)
- Schoenoplectus lacustris – Common club-rush, bulrush – Europe and Asia from Portugal to Sakhalin; North Africa; southern Africa; Eritrea, Yemen
- Schoenoplectus litoralis (Schrad.) Palla – central and southern Europe; northern and central Africa; Comoros; Madagascar; southern Asia from Turkey and Saudi Arabia to China
- Schoenoplectus monocephalus (J.Q.He) S.Yun Liang & S.R.Zhang – Anhui region of China
- Schoenoplectus muricinux (C.B.Clarke) J.Raynal – central and southern Africa
- Schoenoplectus muriculatus (Kük.) Browning – southern Africa
- Schoenoplectus nipponicus (Makino) Soják – Japan, Korea, Manchuria, Russian Far East
- Schoenoplectus × oblongus (T.Koyama) Soják – widely scattered locations in United States and Canada (hybrid S. acutus × S. tabernaemontani)
- Schoenoplectus paludicola (Kunth) Palla – South Africa
- Schoenoplectus pulchellus (Kunth) J.Raynal – Lesotho, South Africa
- Schoenoplectus pungens – Sharp club-rush, three-square bulrush – widespread across North and South America, central Europe, Australia, New Zealand; apparently absent from Asia and Africa
- Schoenoplectus rhodesicus (Podlech) Lye – Zaire, Tanzania, Zambia, Zimbabwe
- Schoenoplectus scirpoides (Schrad.) Browning – eastern and southern Africa
- Schoenoplectus × steinmetzii (Fernald) S.G.Sm. – Maine and Wisconsin (hybrid S. heterochaetus × S. tabernaemontani)
- Schoenoplectus subterminalis (Torr.) Soják – eastern and western US and Canada, though mostly absent in central regions
- Schoenoplectus subulatus (Vahl) Lye – scattered distribution across Africa, Asia, Australia, and some Pacific Island
- Schoenoplectus tabernaemontani (C.C.Gmel.) Palla – virtually cosmopolitan
- Schoenoplectus torreyi (Olney) Palla – eastern Canada, northeastern United States
- Schoenoplectus triqueter (L.) Palla – Europe, Asia and North Africa from Ireland and Canary Islands to Japan; naturalized in Oregon and Washington
