= Scirpus longii =

Conservation status
- Imperiled (NatureServe)

Scientific classification
- Kingdom: Plantae
- Clade: Tracheophytes
- Clade: Angiosperms
- Clade: Monocots
- Clade: Commelinids
- Order: Poales
- Family: Cyperaceae
- Genus: Scirpus
- Species: S. longii

Binomial name
- Scirpus longii Fernald

Species of grass-like plant

Scirpus longii is a species of flowering plant in the sedge family known by the common name Long's bulrush. It is native to eastern North America, where it is limited to the Atlantic coastal plain.

This perennial plant grows from a large rhizome and forms clumps of stems up to 1.5 meters tall. It flowers rarely, any time between May and August. The inflorescence is an open cyme of spikelets up to about a centimeter long.

This species grows in wetlands such as river banks and bogs.

== Conservation status in the United States ==
It is listed a special concern and believed extirpated in Connecticut, as threatened in Maine and Massachusetts, and as endangered in New Jersey and Rhode Island.
