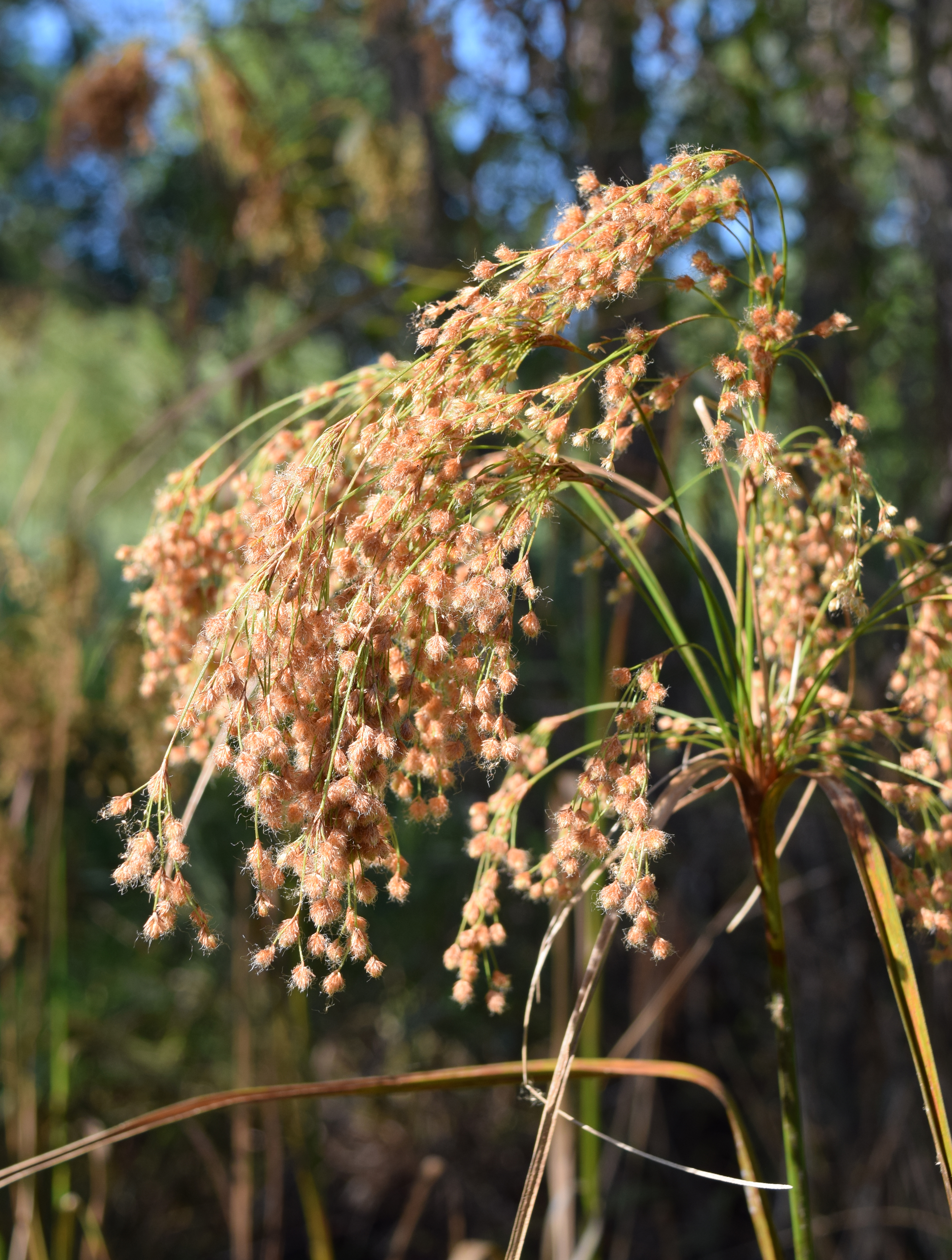

Conservation status
- Secure (NatureServe)

Scientific classification
- Kingdom: Plantae
- Clade: Tracheophytes
- Clade: Angiosperms
- Clade: Monocots
- Clade: Commelinids
- Order: Poales
- Family: Cyperaceae
- Genus: Scirpus
- Species: S. cyperinus

Binomial name
- Scirpus cyperinus (L.) Kunth

= Scirpus cyperinus =

Grass-like plant of wetlands

Scirpus cyperinus, commonly known as woolgrass, is an emergent wetland herb that is native to the eastern United States and eastern Canada. Other common names include cottongrass bulrush and brown woolly sedge.

Woolgrass is not a true grass, despite its common name; it is a type of bulrush (Scirpus). Bulrushes furthermore are not true rushes; they are types of sedges. This sedge is very variable in appearance. In general, it produces short, tough rhizomes and grows in dense clumps. The fertile stems grow upright. There are five to ten leaves per stem. They are up to 80 centimeters long by 1 centimeter wide. The proximal ones have green or reddish sheaths. The inflorescence has upright or spreading branches bearing cymes of up to 15 spikelets each. The spikelet is cylindrical or oval and measures up to 0.8 centimeters in length. It is covered in reddish, brownish, or black scales. The flowers have six long bristles each, making the inflorescence look woolly.

This plant grows in many types of wet habitat, such as marshes and ponds. It can be found in disturbed habitat, such as ditches.

This plant often hybridizes with its relatives Scirpus atrocinctus and S. pedicellatus.

Native Americans used this plant for a number of purposes. The Ojibwa people used it to make bags and mats, and the Potawatomi people used it to stuff pillows.
