= Roland McMillan Harper =

American botanist, geographer, naturalist, explorer, and writer

Roland McMillan Harper (1878 – 1966) was an American botanist, geographer, naturalist, explorer, and writer. He wrote for the Savannah Morning News and covered the settlement of Georgia's wiregrass region in the late 19th century. He is known for his work in the Southeastern United States. The standard author abbreviation R.M.Harper is used to indicate this person as the author when citing a botanical name.

== Life and legacy ==
He was born in Farmington, Maine. When he was 10, his family moved to Dalton, Georgia and five years later to Americus, Georgia.

He and his brother Frances retraced William Bartram's journey through Alabama and the Florida Panhandle.

Harper discovered and described Scirpus georgianus before graduating high school and discovered another 29 flowering plants during his career. More than a dozen are named for him. He collected newspaper clippings, and train timetables. He was a white supremacist.

Harper left a collection of photographs and documents. He was an acquaintance of Nathaniel Britton, Hugo de Vries, and Charles Davenport.
