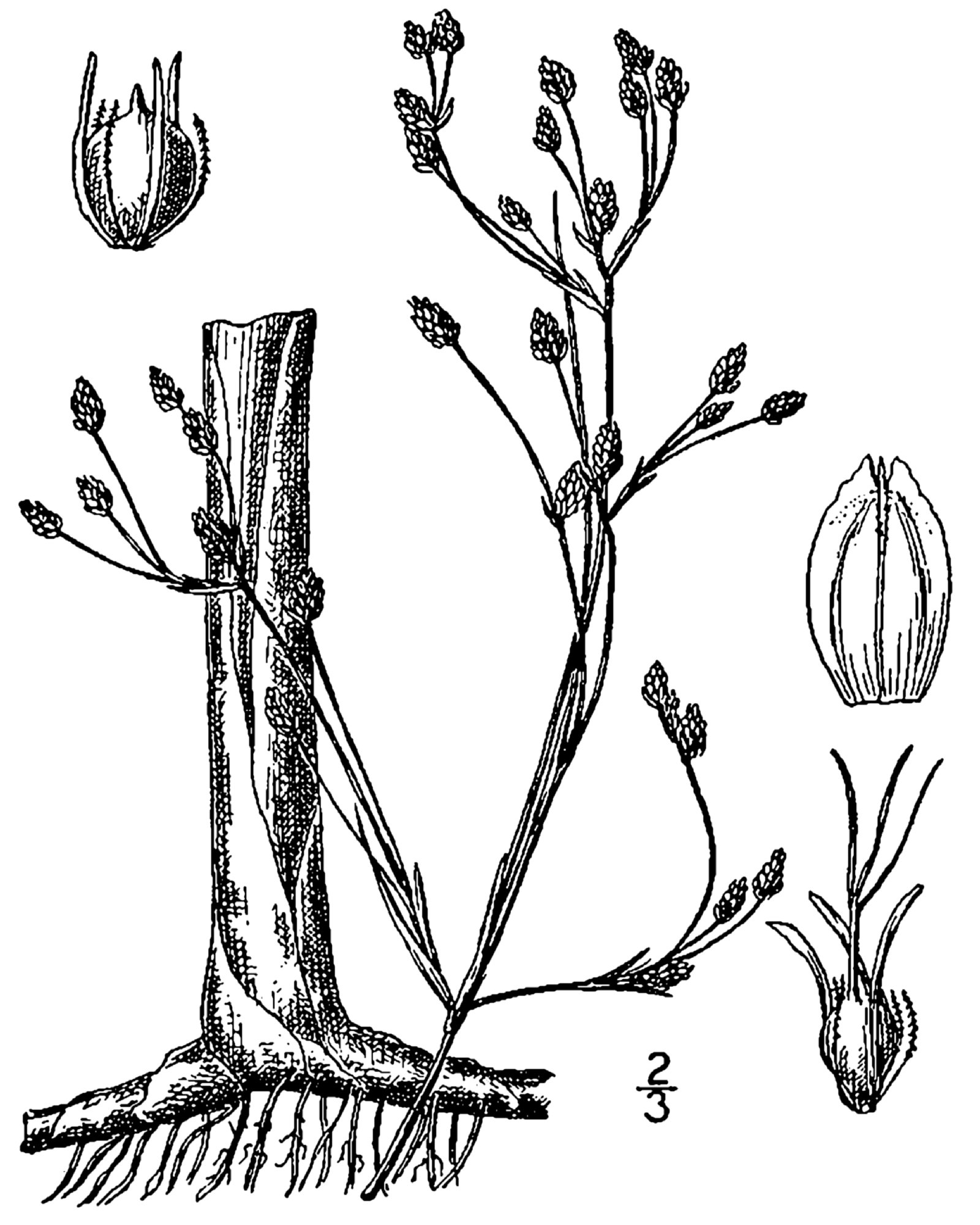
- 1913 illustration

Scientific classification
- Kingdom: Plantae
- Clade: Tracheophytes
- Clade: Angiosperms
- Clade: Monocots
- Clade: Commelinids
- Order: Poales
- Family: Cyperaceae
- Genus: Schoenoplectus
- Species: S. heterochaetus

Binomial name
- Schoenoplectus heterochaetus (Chase) Soják

Synonyms
- Scirpus heterochaetus Chase; Scirpus lacustris var. tenuiculmis E.Sheld.; Schoenoplectus lacustris subsp. tenuiculmis (E.Sheld.) Soják

= Schoenoplectus heterochaetus =

Species of grass-like plant

Schoenoplectus heterochaetus is a species of flowering plant in the sedge family known by the common name slender bulrush. It is native to North America, where it can be found in scattered locations in Canada and the United States.

Schoenoplectus heterochaetus grows in a variety of wetland habitat types, including marshes and lakes. It grows on land or in shallow water. It is a perennial herb growing from a large rhizome system. Its cylindrical stems grow erect to maximum heights sometimes exceeding two meters. The leaves are mostly located at the base of the stem, sheathing around it. The inflorescence is a panicle of many cone-shaped spikelets on long, thin branches.
