= Pentagramma variegata =

Scientific classification
- Domain: Eukaryota
- Kingdom: Animalia
- Phylum: Arthropoda
- Class: Insecta
- Order: Hemiptera
- Suborder: Auchenorrhyncha
- Infraorder: Fulgoromorpha
- Family: Delphacidae
- Genus: Pentagramma
- Species: P. variegata

Binomial name
- Pentagramma variegata Penner, 1947

Species of planthopper

Pentagramma variegata is a species of delphacid planthopper in the family Delphacidae. It is found in North America.
