= Schoenoplectus etuberculatus =

Scientific classification
- Kingdom: Plantae
- Clade: Tracheophytes
- Clade: Angiosperms
- Clade: Monocots
- Clade: Commelinids
- Order: Poales
- Family: Cyperaceae
- Genus: Schoenoplectus
- Species: S. etuberculatus

Binomial name
- Schoenoplectus etuberculatus (Steud.) Soják

Synonyms
- Rhynchospora etuberculata Steud.; Scirpus canbyi A.Gray; Scirpus erythropodus Kuntze; Scirpus etuberculatus (Steud.) Fernald; Scirpus etuberculatus (Steud.) Kuntze; Scirpus leptolepis Chapm.; Scirpus macranthus Boeckeler

Species of grass-like plant

Schoenoplectus etuberculatus, common name Canby's bulrush, is a plant species native to the United States. It is reported from every state on the Gulf and Atlantic coasts from eastern Texas to Delaware, plus isolated populations in Rhode Island (one population in Town of South Kingstown, Washington County) and Missouri (Oregon County). It is an emergent plant growing in ponds, marshes, stream banks, etc., including in brackish water along the coast.

Schoenoplectus etuberculatus is a mat-forming perennial herb spreading by means of underground rhizomes. Culms are up to 2 m (80 inches) tall, triangular in cross-section. Leaves are up to 20 cm (8 inches) long. Inflorescence is branched 2 or 3 times, bearing spikelets that are red, orange or straw-colored. Achenes are egg-shaped, about 4 mm (about 0.16 inches)across.
