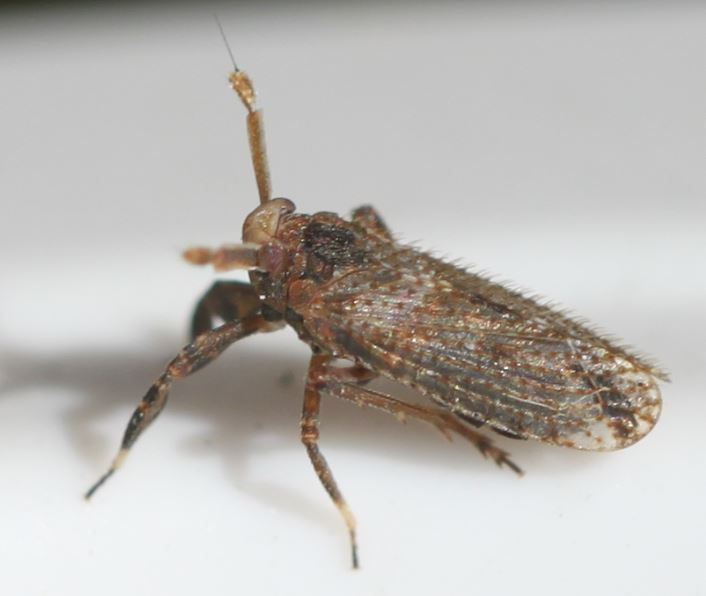
- Asiraca clavicornis

Scientific classification
- Domain: Eukaryota
- Kingdom: Animalia
- Phylum: Arthropoda
- Class: Insecta
- Order: Hemiptera
- Suborder: Auchenorrhyncha
- Infraorder: Fulgoromorpha
- Family: Delphacidae
- Subfamily: Asiracinae; Motschulsky, 1863

Synonyms
- Ugyopinae Fennah, 1979

= Asiracinae =

Subfamily of planthoppers

Asiracinae is a subfamily of delphacid planthoppers in the family Delphacidae. There are at least 30 genera and 180 described species in Asiracinae, which probably has a world-wide distribution.

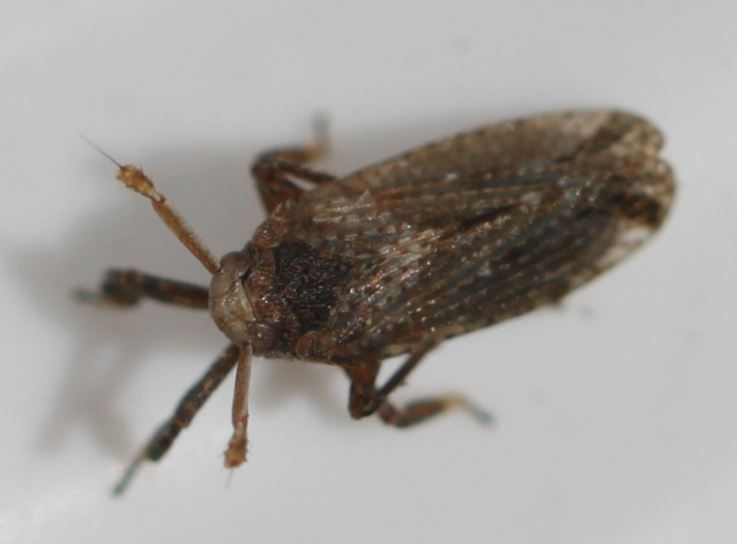
Asiraca clavicornis

== Genera ==
These 31 genera belong to the subfamily Asiracinae:

- Asiraca Latreille, 1796^{i c g}
- Canyra Stål, 1862^{i c g}
- Copicerus Swartz, 1802^{i c g b}
- Elaphodelphax Fennah, 1949^{i c g}
- Eodelphax Kirkaldy, 1901^{i c g}
- Equasystatus Asche, 1983^{i c g}
- Fennasiraca Asche, 1985^{i c g}
- Hainanaella Qin and Zhang, 2007^{i c g}
- Idiosemus Berg, 1883^{i c g}
- Idiosystatus Berg, 1883^{i c g}
- Kiambrama Donaldson, 1988^{i c g}
- Livatiella Fennah, 1956^{i c g}
- Melanesia Kirkaldy, 1907^{i c g}
- Melanugyops Fennah, 1956^{i c g}
- Neopunana Asche, 1983^{i c g}
- Notuchoides Donaldson, 1988^{i c g}
- Notuchus Fennah, 1969^{i c g}
- Ostama Walker, 1857^{i c g}
- Paralivatiella Qin and Zhang, 2010^{i c g}
- Paranda Melichar, 1903^{i c g}
- Parapunana Chen and Hou, 2012^{i c g}
- Pentagramma Van Duzee, 1897^{i c g b}
- Pentasteira Barringer and Bartlett, 2011^{i c g}
- Perimececera Muir, 1913^{i c g}
- Platysystatus Muir, 1930^{i c g}
- Prolivatis Emeljanov, 1995^{i c g}
- Punana Muir, 1913^{i c g}
- Serafinana Gebicki and Szwedo, 2000^{i c g}
- Tetrasteira Muir, 1926^{i c g}
- Ugyopana Fennah, 1950^{i c g}
- Ugyops Guérin-Méneville, 1834^{i c g}

Data sources: i = ITIS, c = Catalogue of Life, g = GBIF, b = Bugguide.net
