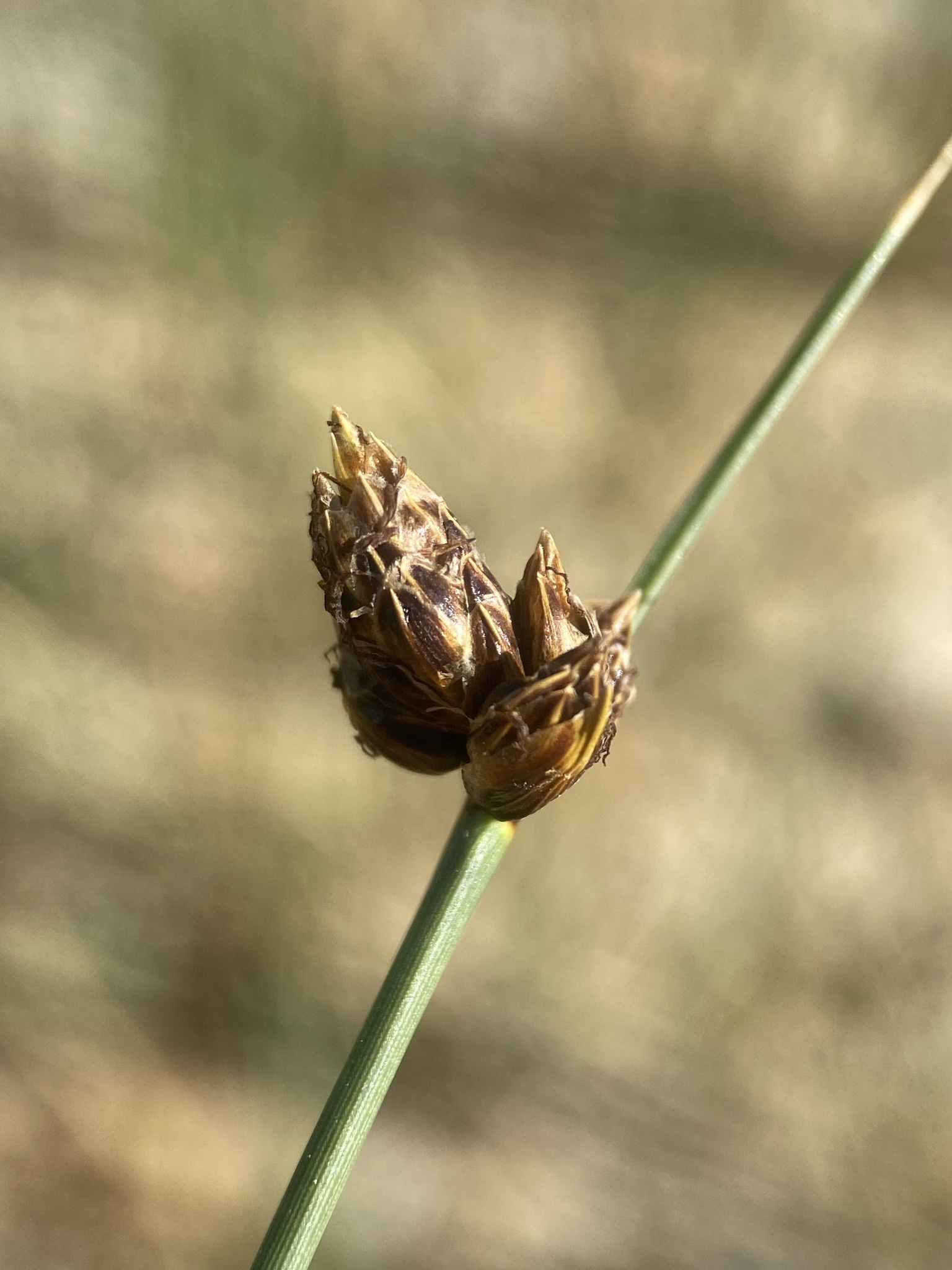

Conservation status
- Least Concern (IUCN 3.1)

Scientific classification
- Kingdom: Plantae
- Clade: Tracheophytes
- Clade: Angiosperms
- Clade: Monocots
- Clade: Commelinids
- Order: Poales
- Family: Cyperaceae
- Genus: Amphiscirpus; Oteng-Yeb.
- Species: A. nevadensis

Binomial name
- Amphiscirpus nevadensis (S.Watson) Oteng-Yeb.

Synonyms
- Isolepis oreophila Phil.; Schoenoplectus nevadensis (S.Watson) Soják; Scirpus chubutensis C.B.Clarke; Scirpus nevadensis S.Watson (1871) (basionym); Scirpus nevadensis var. remireoides (Griseb.) Beetle; Scirpus remireoides Griseb.

= Amphiscirpus =

Genus of grass-like plants

Amphiscirpus is a monotypic genus of flowering plants in the sedge family containing the single species Amphiscirpus nevadensis, which is known by the common name Nevada bulrush.

This plant was formerly included in genus Scirpus. It is native to western North America, including the western Canadian provinces and the northwestern United States, as well as southern South America. It grows in wet and seasonally wet habitat, often on saline and alkaline soils. It is a perennial herb growing from a small, hard rhizome. The erect stems are stiff, ridged, and cylindrical, not three-angled. It lacks aerenchyma, a trait which makes it different from many of its relatives. The stems are sheathed by tough long leaves. The inflorescence is a headlike cluster of a few cone-shaped spikelets accompanied by a long, stiff bract which looks like an extension of the stem.
