= Scirpus flaccidifolius =

Reclining bulrush

Scientific classification
- Kingdom: Plantae
- Clade: Tracheophytes
- Clade: Angiosperms
- Clade: Monocots
- Clade: Commelinids
- Order: Poales
- Family: Cyperaceae
- Genus: Scirpus
- Species: S. flaccidifolius

Binomial name
- Scirpus flaccidifolius (Fernald) Schuyler 1967

Synonyms
- Scirpus atrovirens var. flaccidifolius Fernald

Species of grass-like plant

Scirpus flaccidifolius, the reclining bulrush, is an uncommon plant species endemic to a small region in Virginia and North Carolina. It is reported from only six populations in three counties in Virginia (Greensville, Sussex and Southampton) and one county in North Carolina (Northampton). All known populations are within 100 km of each other, though the species does not seem to be in danger of extinction.

Scirpus flaccidifolius is unusual in the genus in having culms (flowering stalks) that lean against other vegetation instead of being stiff and erect. The species also has wider but less numerous spikelets than closely related species (fewer than 15 spikelets per cluster but each spikelet 2–3 mm wide).
