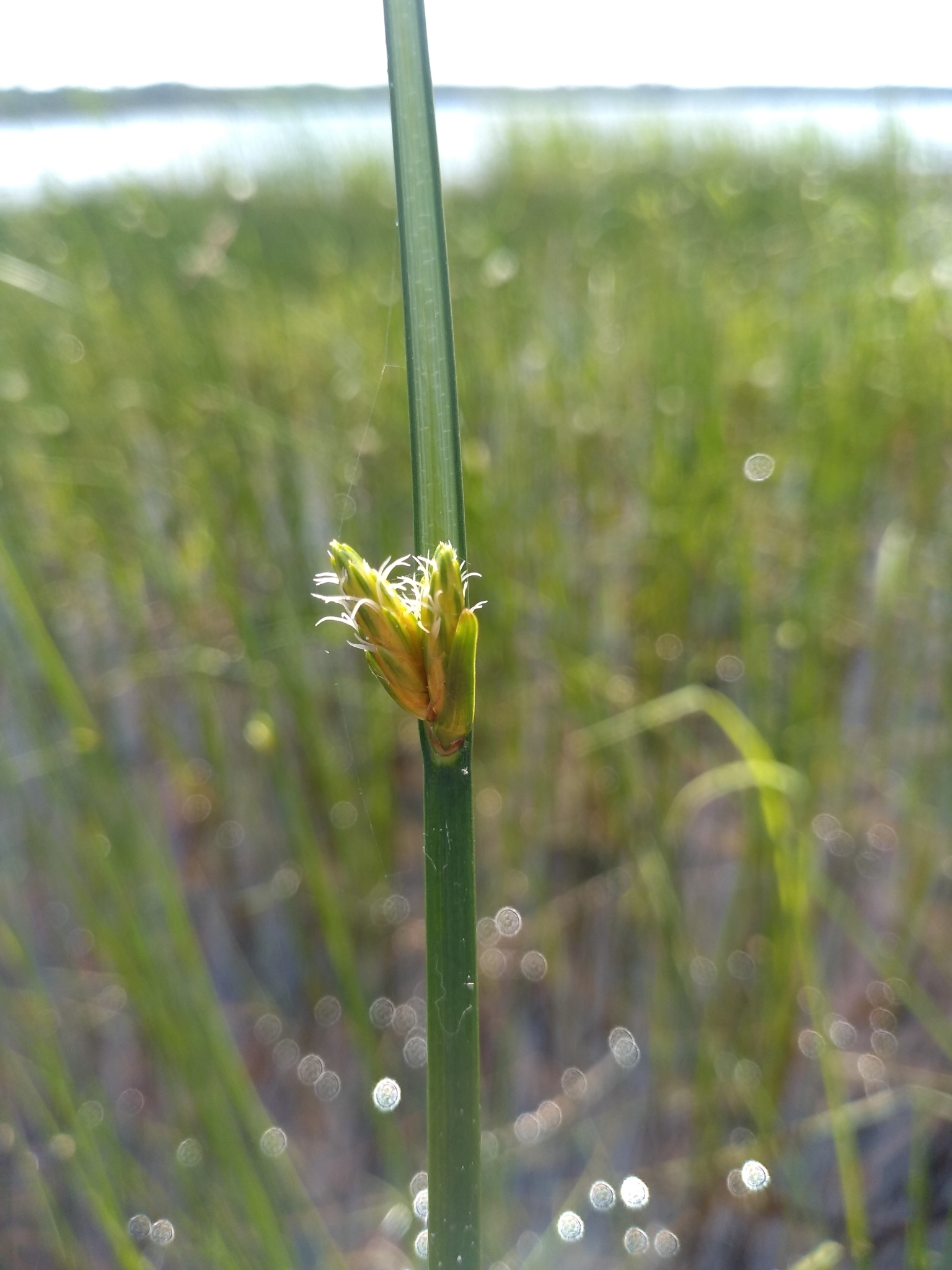

Scientific classification
- Kingdom: Plantae
- Clade: Tracheophytes
- Clade: Angiosperms
- Clade: Monocots
- Clade: Commelinids
- Order: Poales
- Family: Cyperaceae
- Genus: Schoenoplectus
- Species: S. torreyi

Binomial name
- Schoenoplectus torreyi (Olney) Palla

= Schoenoplectus torreyi =

Species of grass-like plant

Schoenoplectus torreyi, common name Torrey bulrush or Torrey's bulrush, is a species of Schoenoplectus found in North America.

== Conservation status in the United States ==
It is listed as endangered and extirpated in Maryland, as endangered in Indiana and Pennsylvania, as threatened in Connecticut, as presumed extirpated in Ohio, and as a special concern in Rhode Island.
