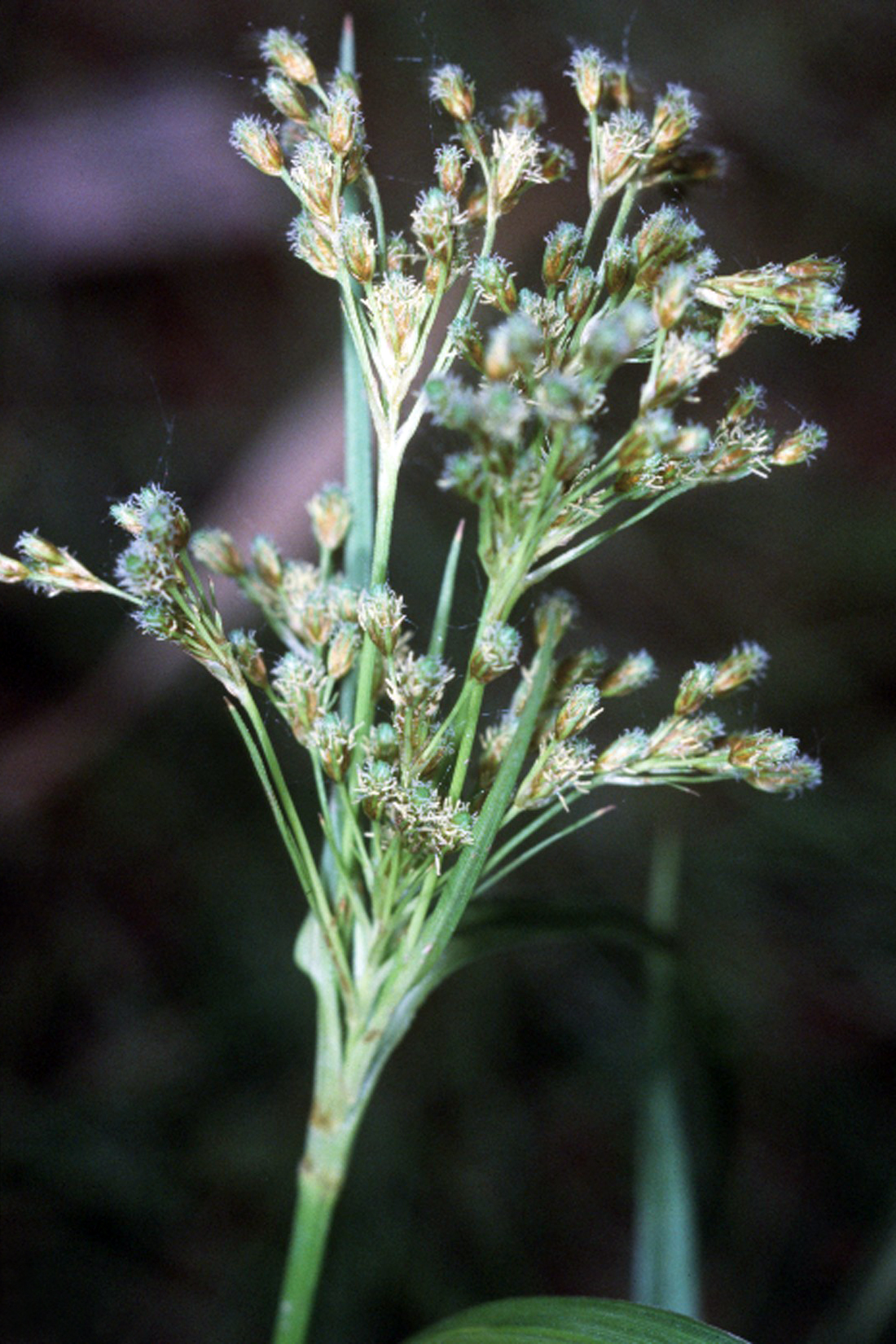

Scientific classification
- Kingdom: Plantae
- Clade: Tracheophytes
- Clade: Angiosperms
- Clade: Monocots
- Clade: Commelinids
- Order: Poales
- Family: Cyperaceae
- Genus: Scirpus
- Species: S. pendulus

Binomial name
- Scirpus pendulus Muhl.

= Scirpus pendulus =

Species of plant

Scirpus pendulus is a species of flowering plant in the sedge family known by the common names pendulous bulrush, rufous bulrush, and nodding bulrush. It is native to North America, where it can be found throughout the eastern United States and Canada, through the American midwest, some areas of the western United States, and into Mexico. It is also known as an introduced species in Australia. It grows in many types of moist and wet habitat, including disturbed areas such as ditches, and sometimes in drier areas. It is a perennial herb growing from a short, thick rhizome system. The erect, three-angled stems grow singly or in tufts and clumps, easily reaching one meter tall. Sheathing leaves occur at the stem bases as well as higher up the stems, the blades reaching up to 40 centimeters. The inflorescence is a panicle of many clusters of spikelets which hang on long, thin branches, often nodding or drooping, especially as the fruit develops.
