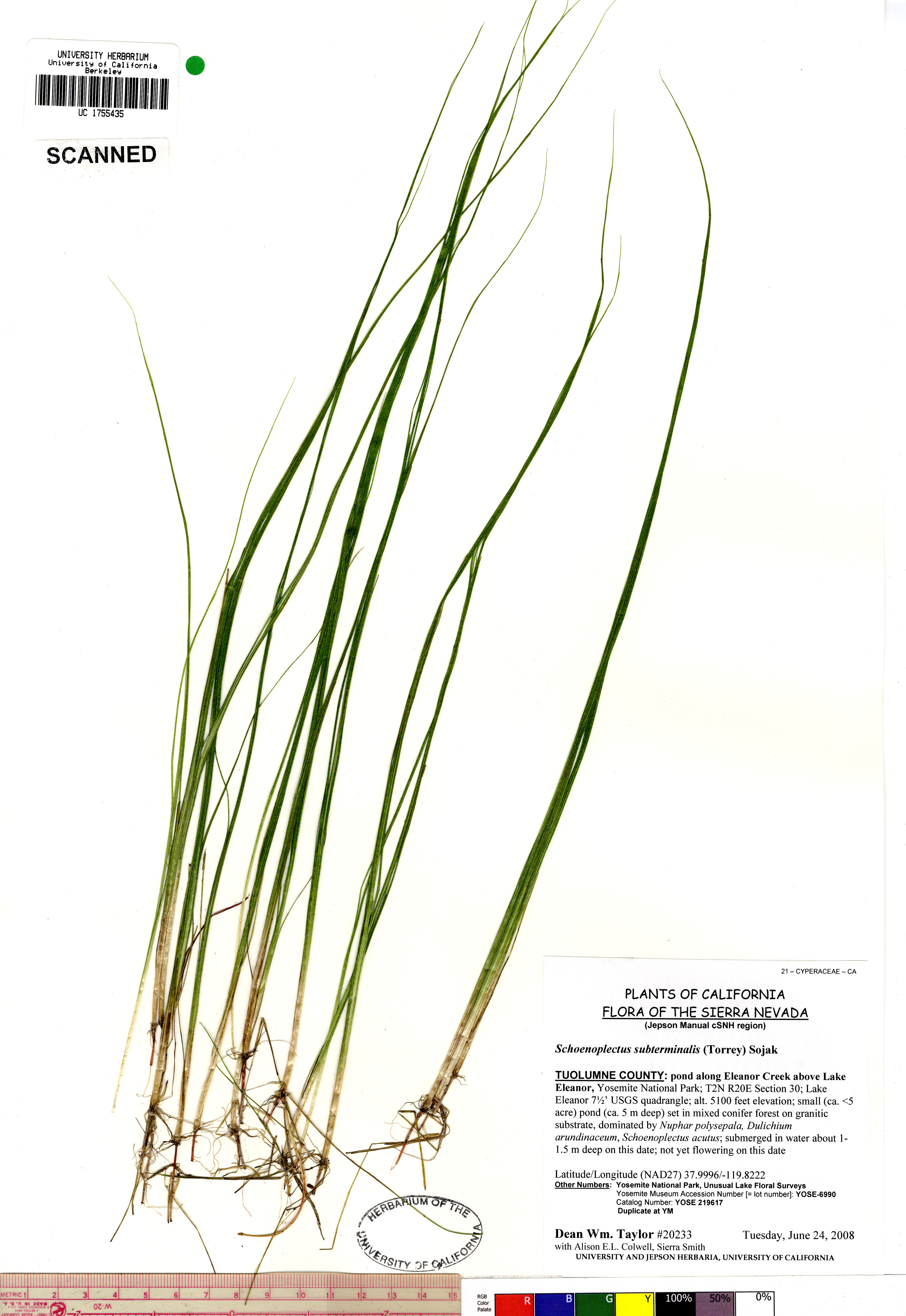
- Herbarium specimen University of California Berkeley collected in Yosemite National Park

Scientific classification
- Kingdom: Plantae
- Clade: Tracheophytes
- Clade: Angiosperms
- Clade: Monocots
- Clade: Commelinids
- Order: Poales
- Family: Cyperaceae
- Genus: Schoenoplectus
- Species: S. subterminalis

Binomial name
- Schoenoplectus subterminalis (Torr.) Soják

Synonyms
- Scirpus subterminalis Torr.; Scirpus subterminalis var. terrestris Paine; Scirpus subterminalis f. terrestris (Paine) Fernald

= Schoenoplectus subterminalis =

Water bulrush, water club-rush

Species of grass-like plant

Schoenoplectus subterminalis is a species of flowering plant in the sedge family known by the common names water bulrush, water club-rush, and swaying bulrush. It is native to North America, where it is known from many parts of Canada and the United States. It has been common in the northeastern US and eastern Canada as well as the Great Lakes region, as well as many locations in the mountains of the West, though apparently absent from the Southwest and most of the Great Plains.

Schoenoplectus subterminalis grows in moist and wet habitat and often grows in shallow water, sometimes entirely submerged. It is a perennial herb forming mats or tufts of very narrow cylindrical stems easily exceeding one meter long. There is a rhizome and sometimes tubers grow on it. When the plant grows in water, only the inflorescences and the tips of the leaf blades break the surface. The inflorescence is generally a single cone-shaped spikelet at the end of the stem accompanied by a stiff, stemlike bract.
