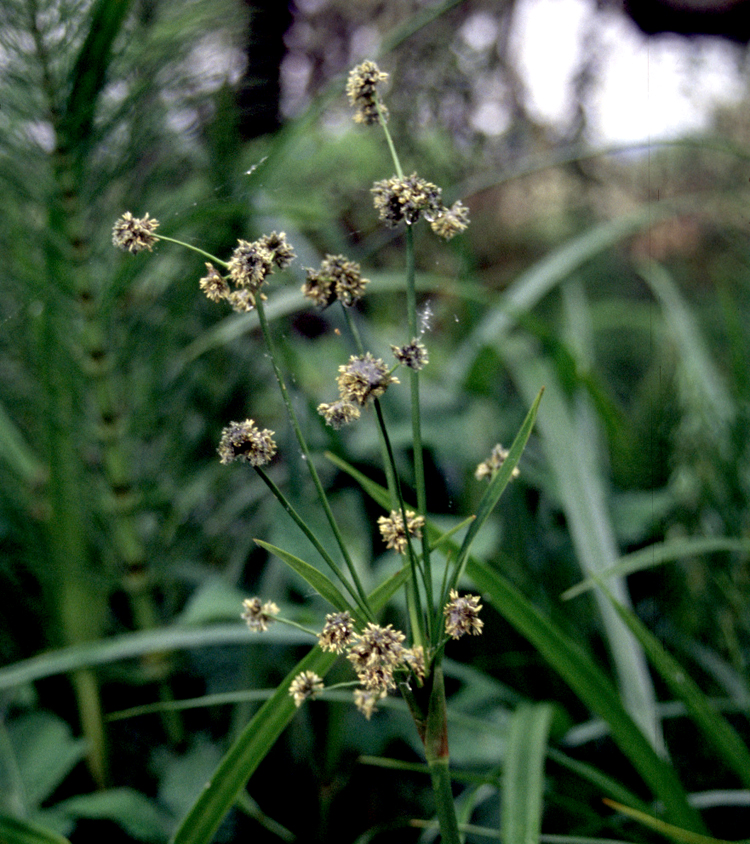

Scientific classification
- Kingdom: Plantae
- Clade: Tracheophytes
- Clade: Angiosperms
- Clade: Monocots
- Clade: Commelinids
- Order: Poales
- Family: Cyperaceae
- Genus: Scirpus
- Species: S. microcarpus

Binomial name
- Scirpus microcarpus J.Presl & C.Presl

= Scirpus microcarpus =

Species of grass-like plant

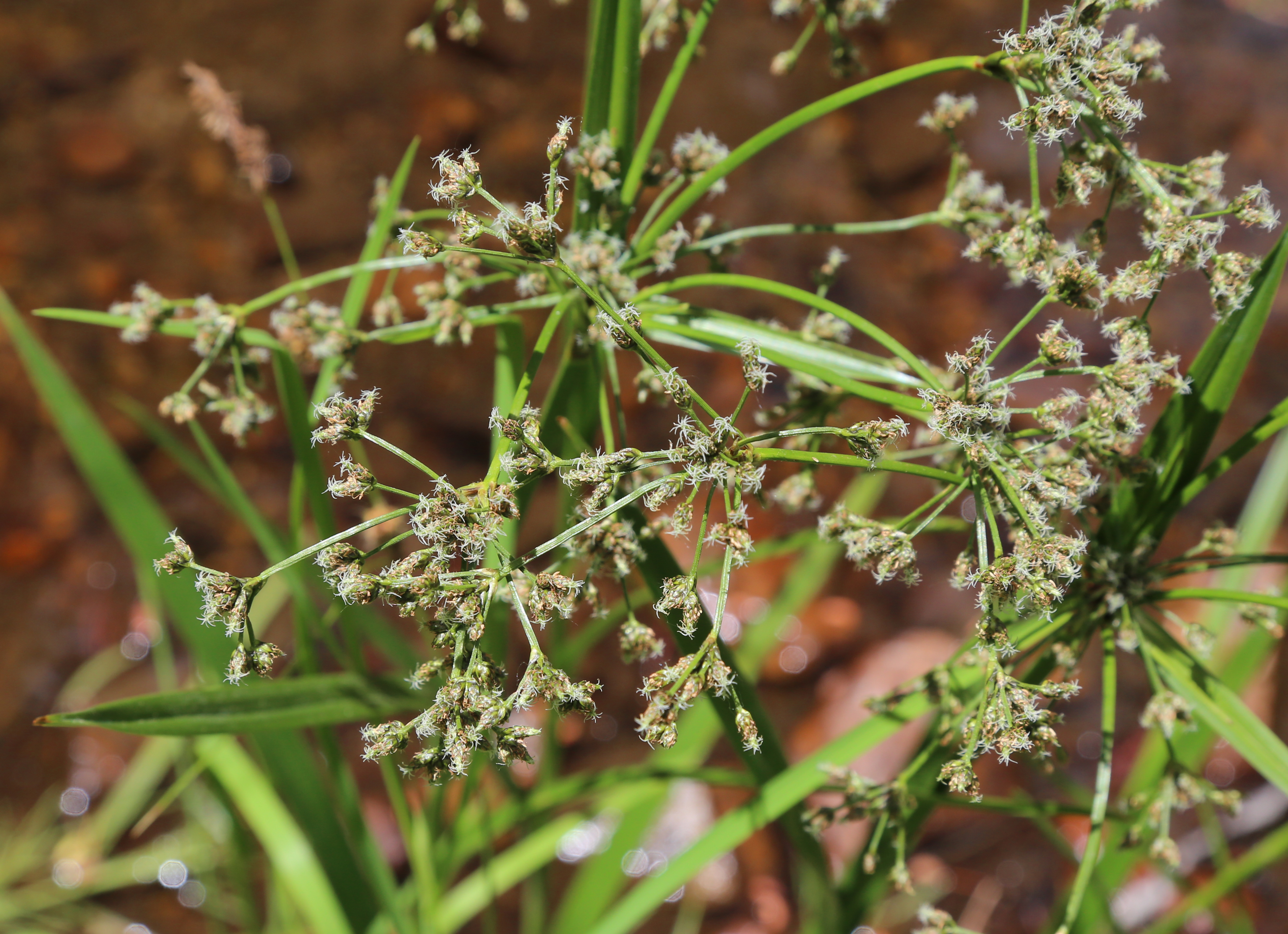
Scirpus microcarpus, 3 plants flowering at stream edge

Scirpus microcarpus is a species of flowering plant in the sedge family known by the common names panicled bulrush, smallfruit bulrush, and barberpole bulrush. It is native to North America, where it can be found throughout the northern and western regions, from Alaska across Canada to the northeastern United States, in most of the central and western states, and in Baja California. It grows in many types of moist and wet habitat. It is a perennial herb growing from a long rhizome system. The erect, three-angled stems often exceed one meter tall. Sheathing leaves occur at the stem bases as well as higher up the stems. The inflorescence is a panicle of many clusters of spikelets and leaflike bracts on long, thin branches. The fruit is a pale, smooth achene less than 2 millimeters long.
