= Pentagramma bivittata =

Scientific classification
- Domain: Eukaryota
- Kingdom: Animalia
- Phylum: Arthropoda
- Class: Insecta
- Order: Hemiptera
- Suborder: Auchenorrhyncha
- Infraorder: Fulgoromorpha
- Family: Delphacidae
- Genus: Pentagramma
- Species: P. bivittata

Binomial name
- Pentagramma bivittata Crawford, 1914

Species of planthopper

Pentagramma bivittata is a species of delphacid planthopper in the family Delphacidae. It is found in the Caribbean, Central America, North America, and South America.
