= Copicerus irroratus =

Scientific classification
- Domain: Eukaryota
- Kingdom: Animalia
- Phylum: Arthropoda
- Class: Insecta
- Order: Hemiptera
- Suborder: Auchenorrhyncha
- Infraorder: Fulgoromorpha
- Family: Delphacidae
- Genus: Copicerus
- Species: C. irroratus

Binomial name
- Copicerus irroratus Swartz, 1802

Species of planthopper

Copicerus irroratus is a species of delphacid planthopper in the family Delphacidae. It is found in the Caribbean, Central America, North America, and South America.

== Subspecies ==
These two subspecies belong to the species Copicerus irroratus:

- Copicerus irroratus irroratus Swartz, 1802^{i g}
- Copicerus irroratus thoracicus (Guérin-Méneville, 1856)^{i c g}

Data sources: i = ITIS, c = Catalogue of Life, g = GBIF, b = Bugguide.net
