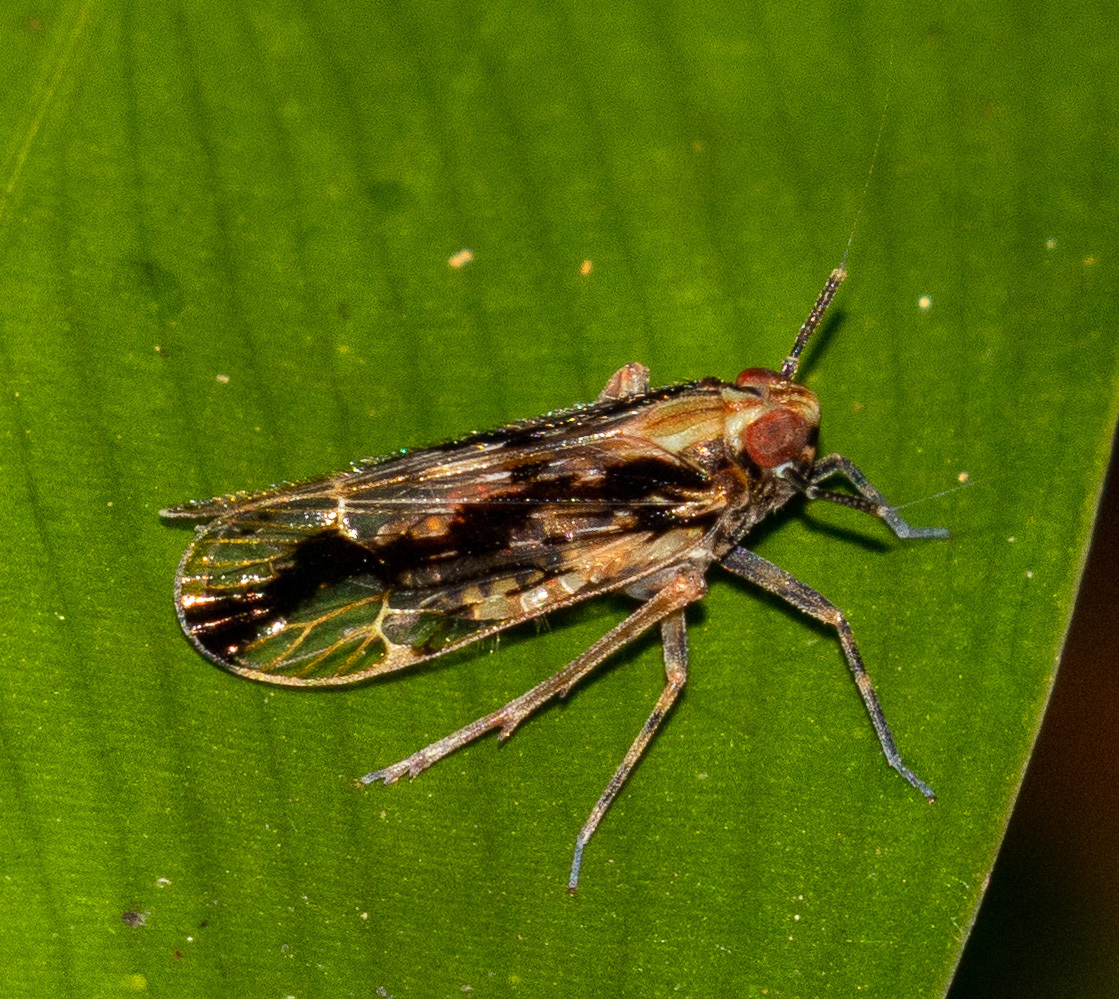
- In Brasil

Scientific classification
- Kingdom: Animalia
- Phylum: Arthropoda
- Clade: Pancrustacea
- Class: Insecta
- Order: Hemiptera
- Suborder: Auchenorrhyncha
- Infraorder: Fulgoromorpha
- Family: Delphacidae
- Subfamily: Asiracinae
- Tribe: Ugyopini
- Genus: Ugyops; Guérin-Méneville, 1834-01

Subgenera
- Paracona; Ugyops

Synonyms
- Hygiops Amyot & Serville, 1843

= Ugyops =

Genus of insects

Ugyops is a genus of delphacid planthoppers in the family Delphacidae. There are more than 100 described species in the genus Ugyops, found in Oceania, Central America, and the Caribbean.

== Species ==
These 108 species belong to the genus Ugyops:

- Ugyops alecto Fennah, 1969
- Ugyops almo Fennah, 1958
- Ugyops amboinensis Muir, 1913
- Ugyops anatahani Fennah, 1956
- Ugyops andraemon Fennah, 1967
- Ugyops annulipes (Stål, 1854)
- Ugyops apollo Fennah, 1956
- Ugyops arestor Fennah, 1969
- Ugyops ariadne Fennah, 1956
- Ugyops arignotus Fennah, 1964
- Ugyops aristellus (Kirby, 1900)
- Ugyops astrolabei Fennah, 1950
- Ugyops atreces Fennah, 1964
- Ugyops bianor Fennah, 1950
- Ugyops bifurcatus (Metcalf, 1945)
- Ugyops bougainvillei Muir, 1921
- Ugyops brevifrons (Jacobi, 1928)
- Ugyops brevipennis Muir, 1921
- Ugyops brunneus (Fowler, 1905)
- Ugyops bryani Muir, 1927
- Ugyops bryanni Muir, 1927
- Ugyops butleri Muir, 1925
- Ugyops buxtoni Muir, 1931
- Ugyops caelatus (White, 1879)
- Ugyops cantilena Fennah, 1964
- Ugyops cassander Fennah, 1964
- Ugyops cercyo Fennah, 1971
- Ugyops cheesmanae Fennah, 1964
- Ugyops contiguus (Walker, 1857)
- Ugyops crotopus Fennah, 1958
- Ugyops demeter Fennah, 1950
- Ugyops demonice Fennah, 1970
- Ugyops eos Fennah, 1956
- Ugyops facialis (Distant, 1917)
- Ugyops flagellata (Fennah, 1945)
- Ugyops flyensis Schmidt, 1930
- Ugyops godmani (Fowler, 1905)
- Ugyops hackeri Donaldson, 1983
- Ugyops haliacmon Fennah, 1958
- Ugyops houadouensis Distant, 1920
- Ugyops impictus Stål, 1870
- Ugyops inermis Distant, 1920
- Ugyops insularis Muir, 1926
- Ugyops isolata Caldwell, 1951
- Ugyops isolatus Caldwell, 1951
- Ugyops kellersi Muir, 1921
- Ugyops kinbergi (Stål, 1859)
- Ugyops lalokensis Muir, 1913
- Ugyops lato Fennah, 1969
- Ugyops laui Fennah, 1950
- Ugyops leaenus Fennah, 1958
- Ugyops lifuanus Fennah, 1969
- Ugyops liturifrons (Walker, 1870)
- Ugyops longiceps Muir, 1931
- Ugyops longifrons (Jacobi, 1928)
- Ugyops macareis Fennah, 1964
- Ugyops maculipennis Schmidt, 1926
- Ugyops manturna Fennah, 1969
- Ugyops medius (Walker, 1870)
- Ugyops menelaus Fennah, 1964
- Ugyops musgravei Muir, 1931
- Ugyops necopinus Fennah, 1950
- Ugyops nemestrinus Fennah, 1969
- Ugyops nerinus Fennah, 1964
- Ugyops nesiotes Fennah, 1964
- Ugyops notivenus (Walker, 1857)
- Ugyops occidentalis Muir, 1918
- Ugyops ocypetes Fennah, 1964
- Ugyops odites Fennah, 1964
- Ugyops orchamus Fennah, 1964
- Ugyops orestilla Fennah, 1964
- Ugyops oromedon Fennah, 1958
- Ugyops osborni Metcalf, 1943
- Ugyops palliatus Fennah, 1964
- Ugyops pelorus Fennah, 1965
- Ugyops percheronii Guérin-Méneville, 1834
- Ugyops petina Fennah, 1967
- Ugyops pictifrons Stål, 1870
- Ugyops pictulus (Walker, 1857)
- Ugyops planguncula Fennah, 1969
- Ugyops privatus (Walker, 1870)
- Ugyops pygmaeus Fennah, 1964
- Ugyops raouli (Muir, 1923)
- Ugyops rhadamanthus Fennah, 1965
- Ugyops robusta (Distant, 1917)
- Ugyops romani (Muir, 1930)
- Ugyops rotana Fennah, 1956
- Ugyops rufus Muir, 1927
- Ugyops samoaensis Muir, 1921
- Ugyops samoensis Muir, 1921
- Ugyops sejunctus Donaldson, 1983
- Ugyops senescens Distant, 1909
- Ugyops seychellensis Distant, 1917
- Ugyops similis Schmidt, 1926
- Ugyops stigmatus (Crawford, 1914)
- Ugyops sulcata Muir, 1931
- Ugyops superciliatus Fennah, 1956
- Ugyops tamu Fennah, 1964
- Ugyops taracuae (Muir, 1930)
- Ugyops taranis Fennah, 1964
- Ugyops tonganus Fennah, 1967
- Ugyops tripunctatus (Kato, 1931)
- Ugyops vitiensis Kirkaldy, 1907
- Ugyops vittatus (Matsumura, 1906)
- Ugyops walkeri Metcalf, 1943
- Ugyops wilkesi Muir, 1927
- Ugyops zimmermani Fennah, 1950
- Ugyops zoe Fennah, 1956
