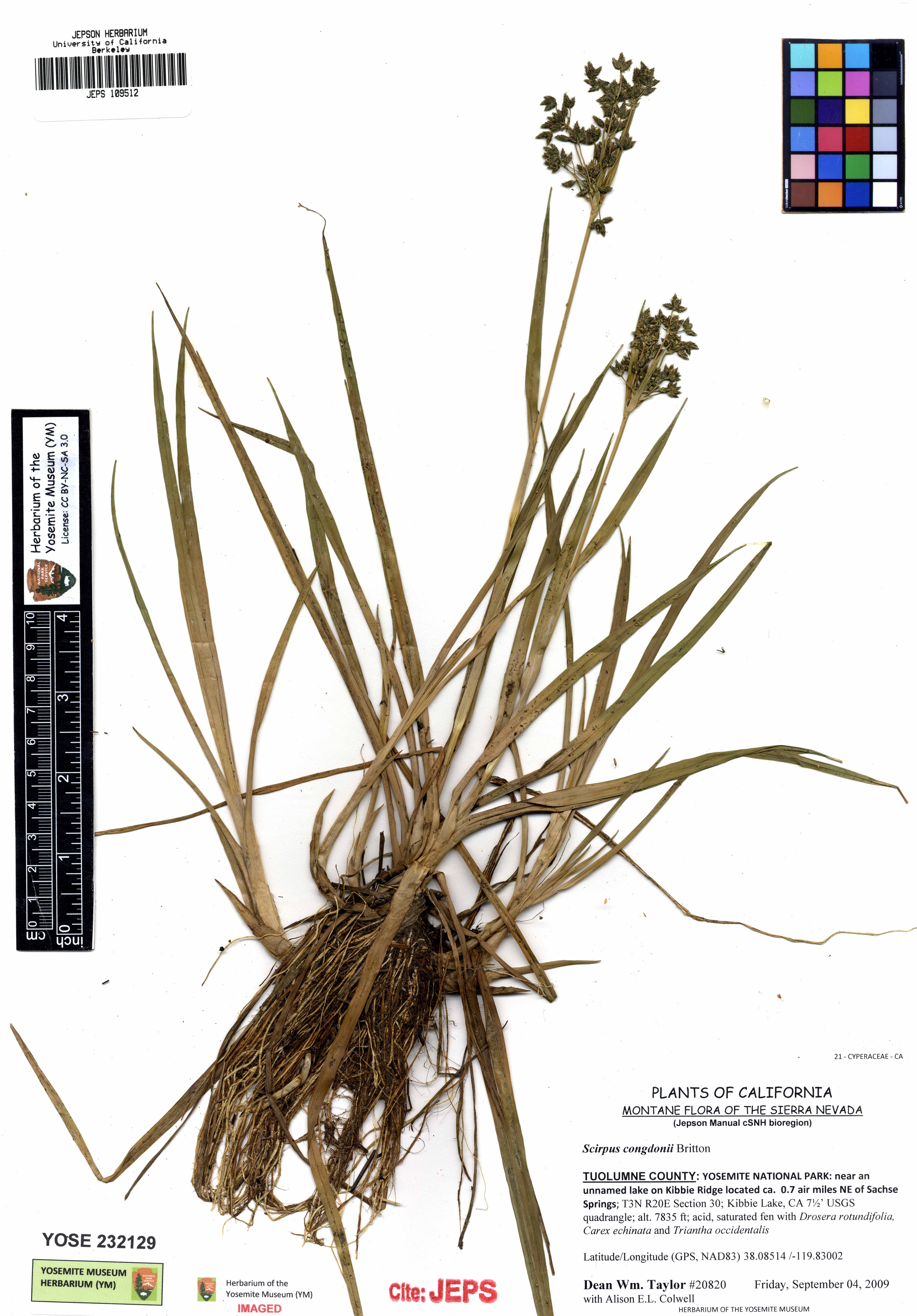

Scientific classification
- Kingdom: Plantae
- Clade: Tracheophytes
- Clade: Angiosperms
- Clade: Monocots
- Clade: Commelinids
- Order: Poales
- Family: Cyperaceae
- Genus: Scirpus
- Species: S. congdonii

Binomial name
- Scirpus congdonii Britton

= Scirpus congdonii =

Species of grass-like plant

Scirpus congdonii is a species of flowering plant in the sedge family known by the common name Congdon's bulrush after noted Californian botanist J.W. Congdon. It is native to the mountains and plateaus of far northern California and adjacent sections of southern Oregon and western Nevada. It can be found in wetland habitat and other moist areas, such as mountain meadows and waterways. It is a perennial herb forming a loose or dense clump of erect stems growing up to half a meter tall, solitary stems sometimes occurring as well. The stems are three-angled and narrow at the middle. Sheathing leaves occur at the stem bases as well as higher up the stems. The inflorescence occurs at the end of the stem, with small additional ones growing from leaf axils. The inflorescence consists of several clusters of many spikelets wrapped at the bases in a leaflike bract.
