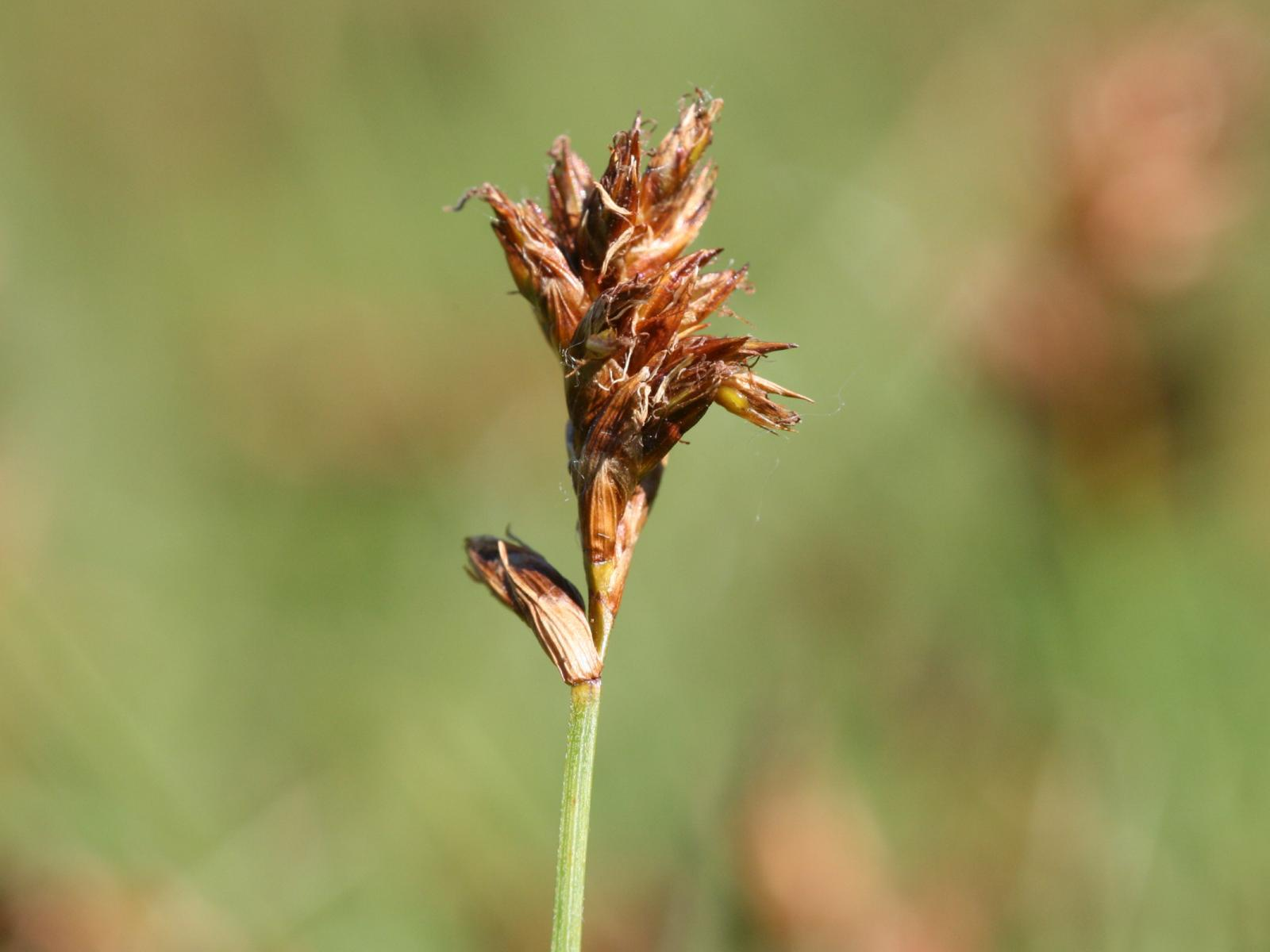

Scientific classification
- Kingdom: Plantae
- Clade: Tracheophytes
- Clade: Angiosperms
- Clade: Monocots
- Clade: Commelinids
- Order: Poales
- Family: Cyperaceae
- Genus: Blysmus
- Species: B. compressus

Binomial name
- Blysmus compressus (L.) Panz. ex Link

= Blysmus compressus =

Species of grass-like plant

Blysmus compressus is a species of flat sedge belonging to the family Cyperaceae.

Its native range is Europe to Himalaya.
