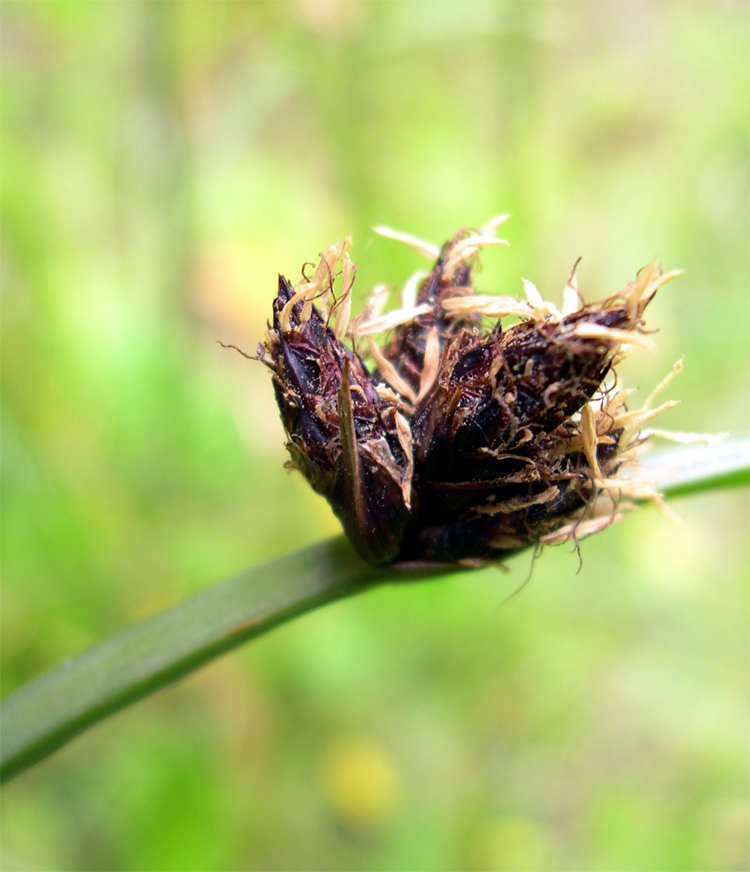

Scientific classification
- Kingdom: Plantae
- Clade: Embryophytes
- Clade: Tracheophytes
- Clade: Angiosperms
- Clade: Monocots
- Clade: Commelinids
- Order: Poales
- Family: Cyperaceae
- Genus: Schoenoplectus
- Species: S. pungens

Binomial name
- Schoenoplectus pungens (Vahl) Palla

Synonyms
- Scirpus pungens Vahl; Heleogiton pungens (Vahl) Rchb. in J.C.Mössler & H.G.L.Reichenbach; Scirpus americanus var. pungens (Vahl) Barros & Osten

= Schoenoplectus pungens =

Species of grass-like plant

Schoenoplectus pungens is a species of flowering plant in the sedge family known as common threesquare, common three-square bulrush and sharp club-rush. It is a herbaceous emergent plant that is widespread across much of North and South America as well as Europe, New Zealand and Australia.

== Habitat ==
Threesquare is found in open, sun-lit marshes and along the shores of lakes and ponds, in water up to 1 m (3 ft 3 in) deep. It is resistant to fire.

== Description ==
Schoenoplectus pungens is a long-lived perennial herb up to 1.5 m (4 ft 11 in) tall. The foliage is dark green, rough and dense. The small flowers are grouped in dense spikelets, with of 1–7 spikelets on each stem. The seeds are brown.

It is closely related to Schoenoplectus americanus, and many Schoenoplectus pungens specimens have long been misidentified as Schoenoplectus americanus.

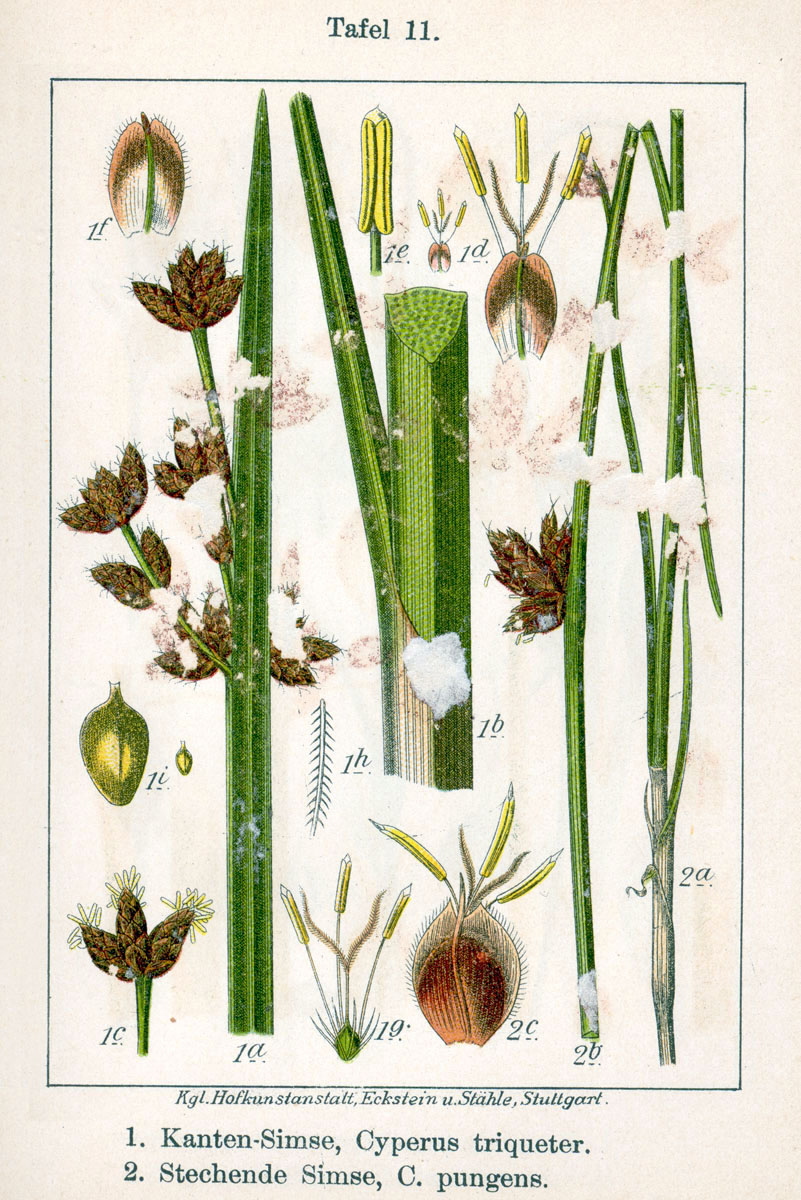
Painting by Jacob Sturm in Deutschlands Flora in Abbildungen

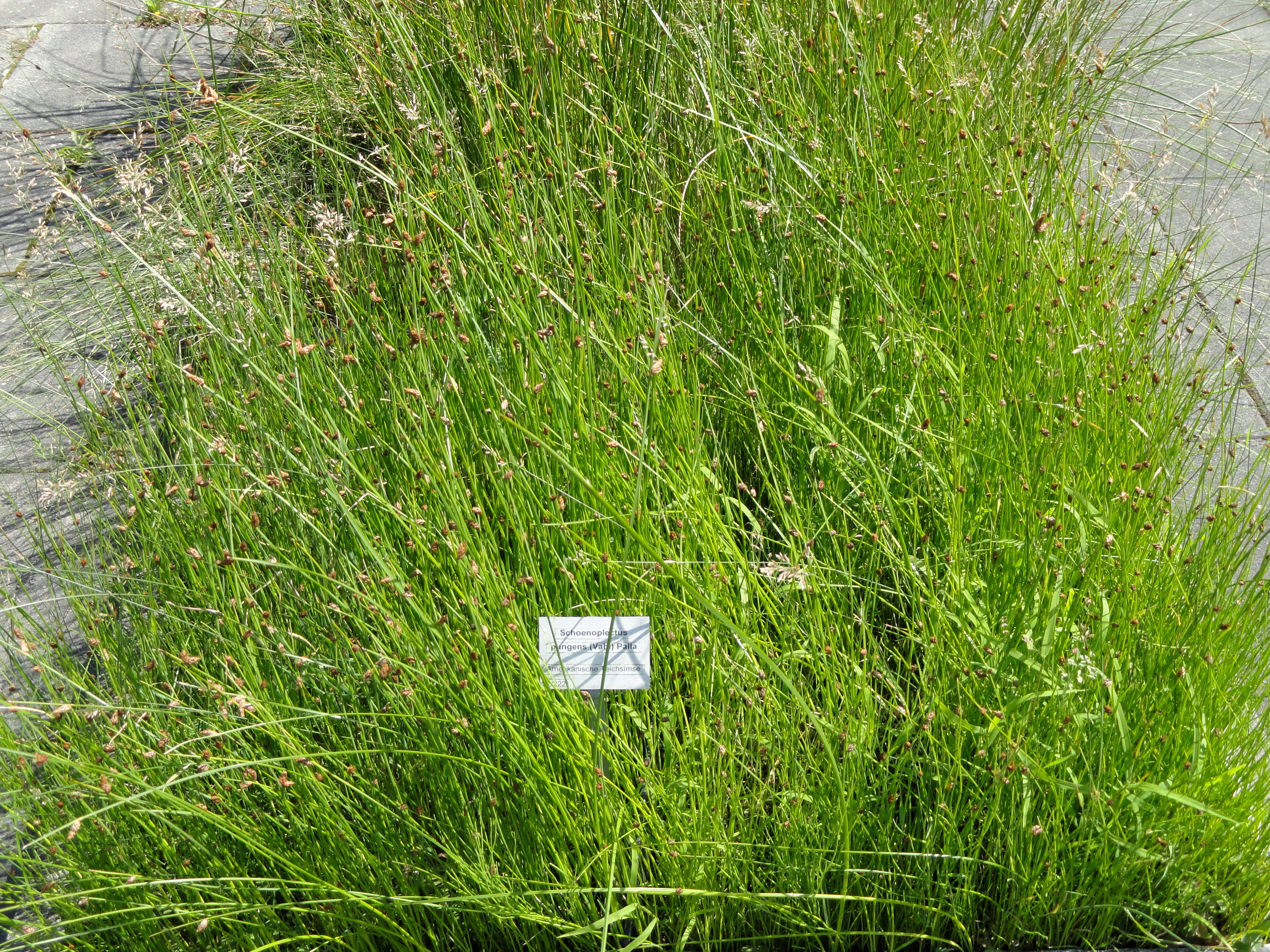
At the Botanical Garden of Goethe University Frankfurt

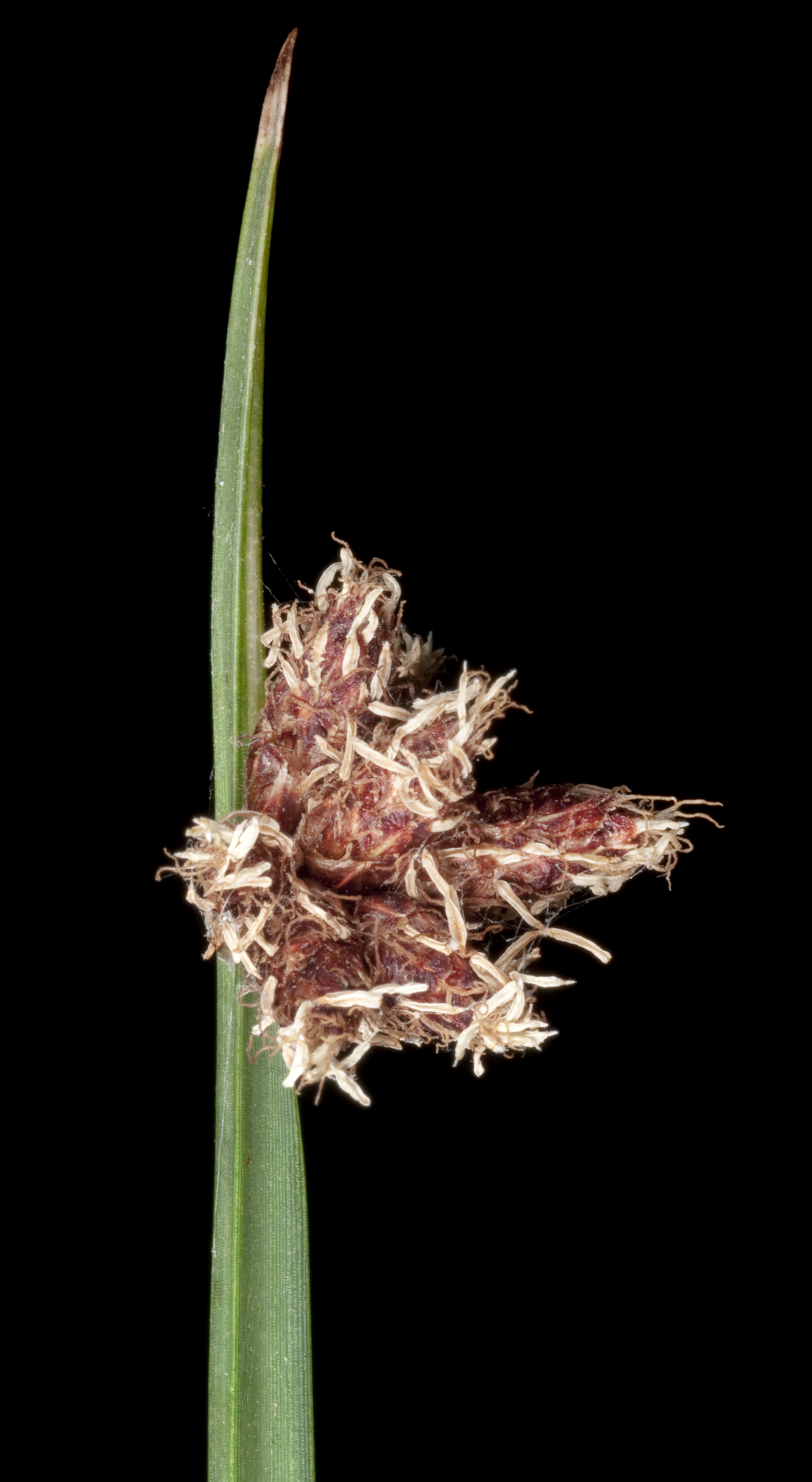
