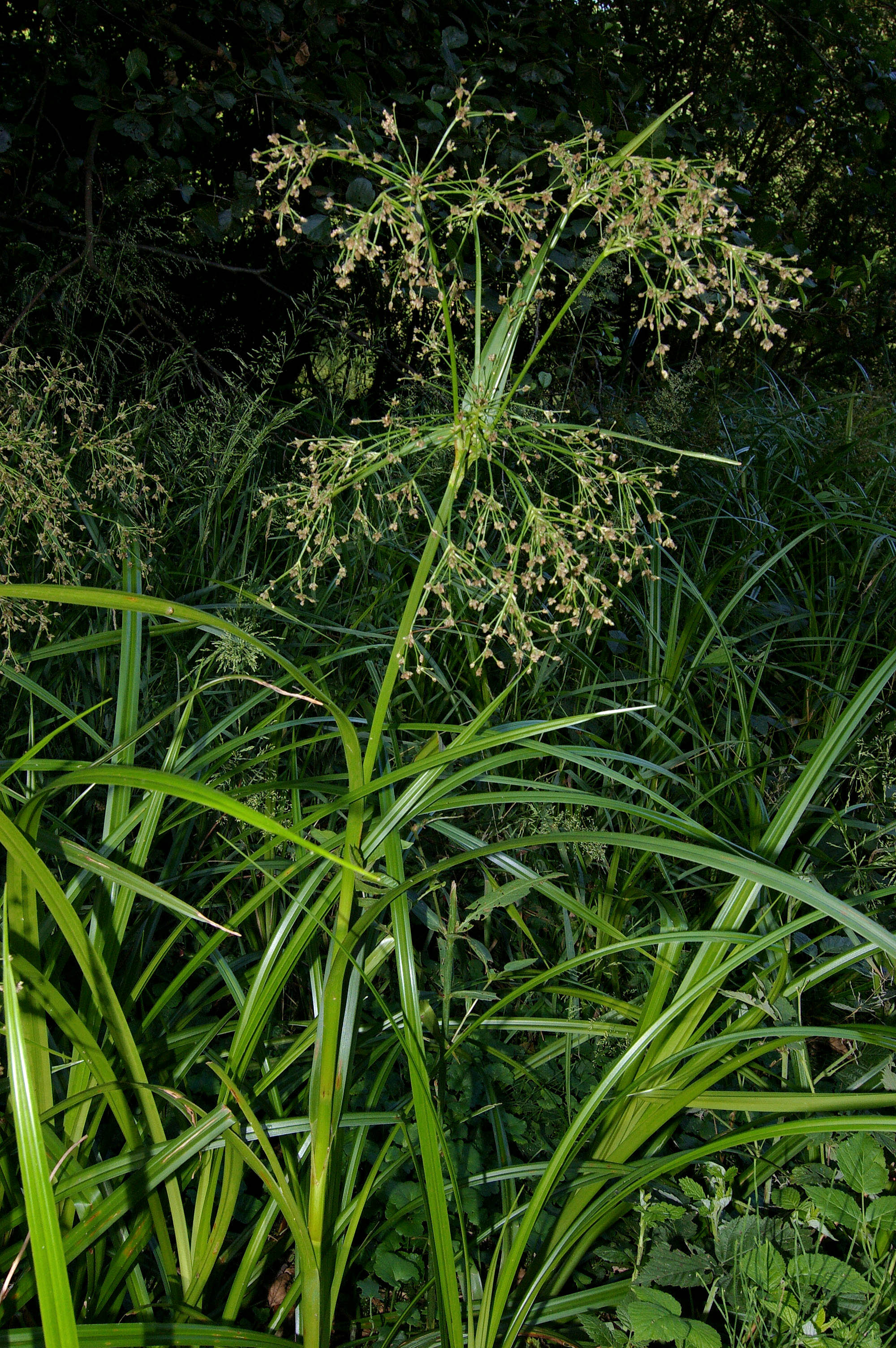

Scientific classification
- Kingdom: Plantae
- Clade: Tracheophytes
- Clade: Angiosperms
- Clade: Monocots
- Clade: Commelinids
- Order: Poales
- Family: Cyperaceae
- Genus: Scirpus
- Species: S. sylvaticus

Binomial name
- Scirpus sylvaticus L.

Synonyms
- Cyperus sylvaticus (L.) Missbach & E.H.L.Krause; Nemocharis sylvatica (L.) Beurl.; Schoenus sylvaticus (L.) Bernh.; Scirpus gramineus Neck.; Scirpus latifolius Gilib., nom. inval.; Seidlia jechlii Opiz, nom. inval.; Seidlia sylvatica (L.) Opiz; Taphrogiton sylvaticum (L.) Montandon

= Scirpus sylvaticus =

Species of flowering plant

Scirpus sylvaticus, the wood clubrush, is a species of flowering plant in the sedge family.

Scirpus sylvaticus can reach 1 m, and has triangular stems.

S. sylvaticus widespread in Eurasia, is very common in the European part of Russia and in Southern Siberia. It is most often a coastal species, occurring in wet habitat such as marshes in brackish and saltwater, along swamps, along the banks of water bodies, in marshy forests and in wet meadows. It is a perennial herb growing from a rhizome system with associated tubers.

This plant is an important food source for waterfowl. The seeds are food for birds and other animals, such as muskrats.
