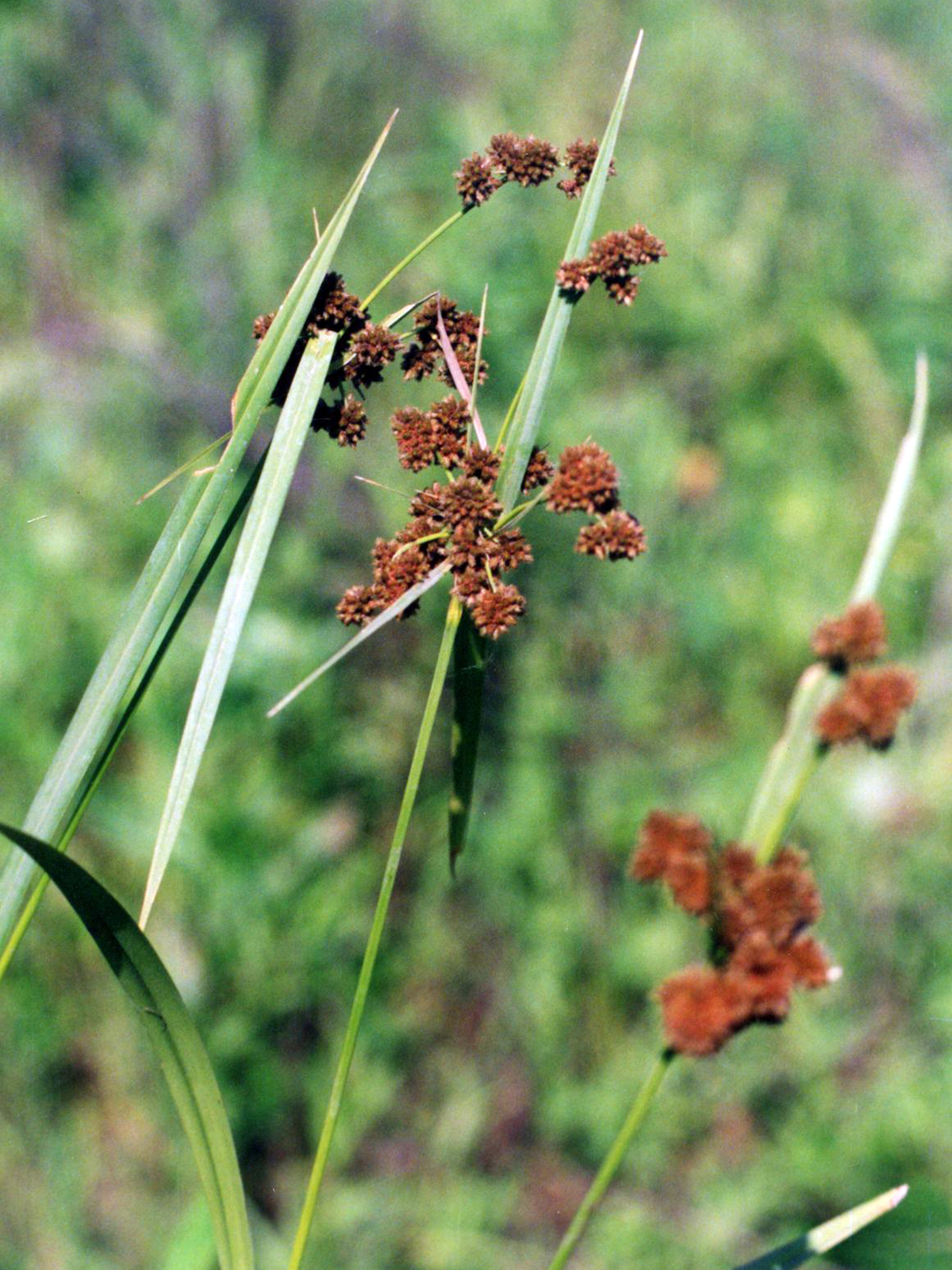
- At Nahant Marsh in Scott County, Iowa

Scientific classification
- Kingdom: Plantae
- Clade: Tracheophytes
- Clade: Angiosperms
- Clade: Monocots
- Clade: Commelinids
- Order: Poales
- Family: Cyperaceae
- Genus: Scirpus
- Species: S. atrovirens

Binomial name
- Scirpus atrovirens Willd.

= Scirpus atrovirens =

Species of grass-like plant

Scirpus atrovirens, known as dark-green bulrush, is a perennial sedge native to wetlands of eastern Canada and the United States. It is sometimes called dark green bulsedge, black bulrush, or green bulrush.

Scirpus atrovirens grows in a wide variety of wetland habitats, typically in sunny areas rather than shady. It can be found in wet meadows and shrubby thickets, openings in swamps, marshes, shorelines, as well as roadside ditches. The plant can grow up to five feet tall, and thrives in hardiness zones 3–9.

It is closely related to Scirpus hattorianus and Scirpus georgianus, with mature fruits necessary for accurate identification.
