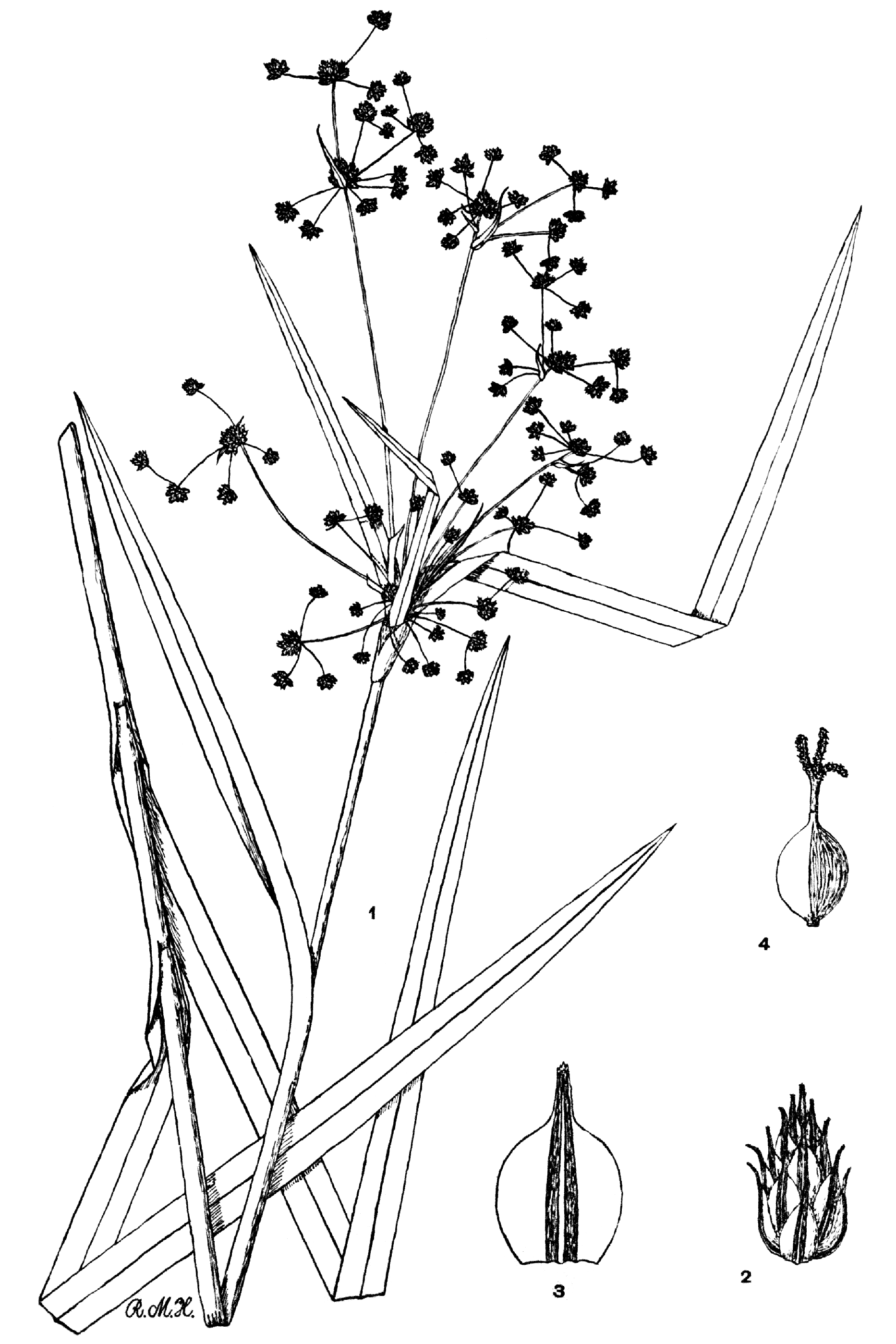
- Illustration by Roland McMillan Harper

Scientific classification
- Kingdom: Plantae
- Clade: Tracheophytes
- Clade: Angiosperms
- Clade: Monocots
- Clade: Commelinids
- Order: Poales
- Family: Cyperaceae
- Genus: Scirpus
- Species: S. georgianus

Binomial name
- Scirpus georgianus R.M.Harper

= Scirpus georgianus =

Species of plant

Scirpus georgianus, or Georgia bulrush, is a flowering plant in the family Cyperaceae that grows in much of the eastern half of North America. Its habitat is wet marshy field areas prone to seasonal flooding. It was described by Roland McMillan Harper.

It is sometimes confused with Scirpus hattorianus.
