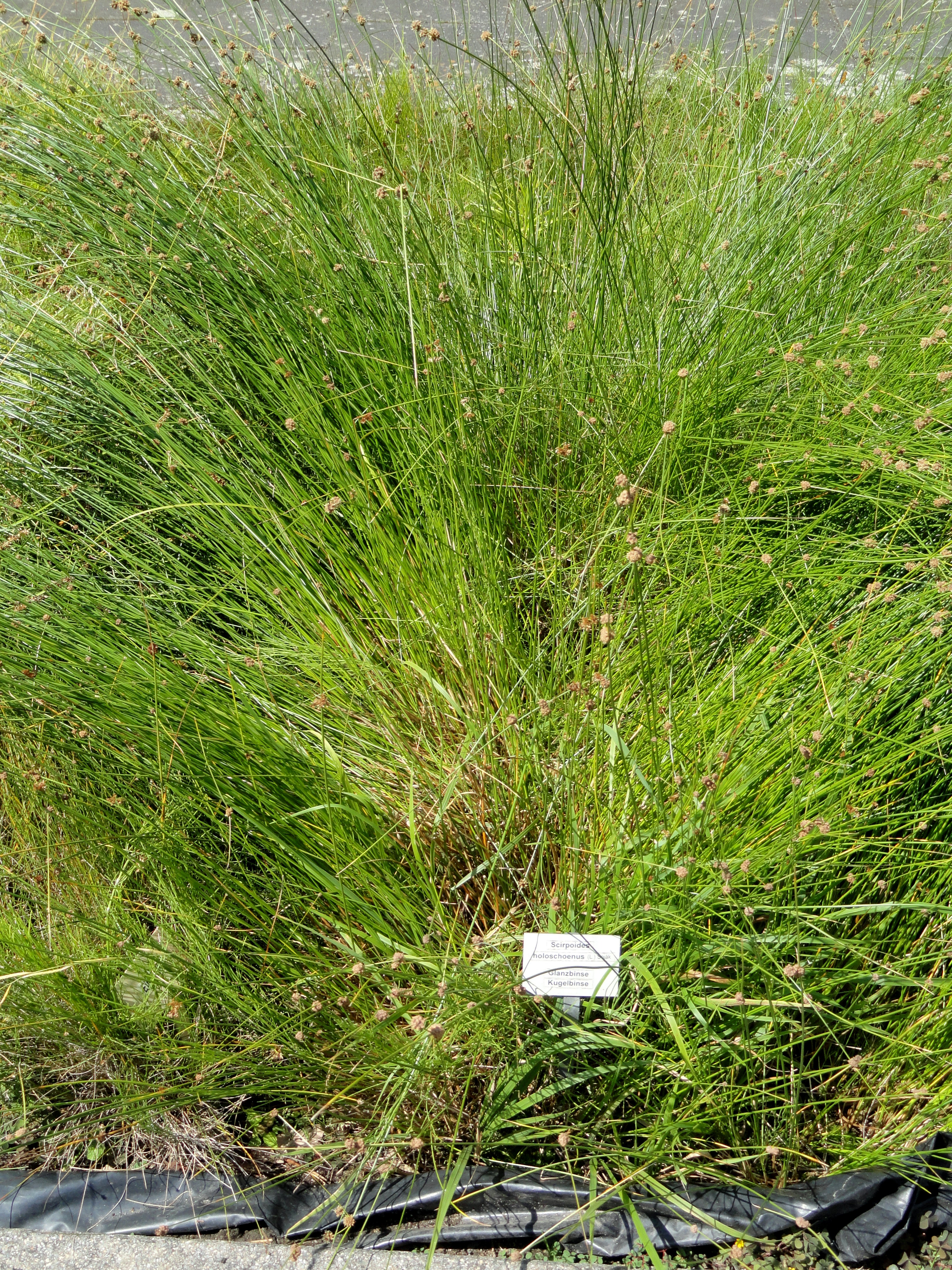
- Scirpoides holoschoenus at Botanical Garden Frankfurt

Scientific classification
- Kingdom: Plantae
- Clade: Tracheophytes
- Clade: Angiosperms
- Clade: Monocots
- Clade: Commelinids
- Order: Poales
- Family: Cyperaceae
- Genus: Scirpoides; Ség.

Synonyms
- Holoschoenus Link; Karinia Reznicek & McVaugh

= Scirpoides =

Genus of sedges

Scirpoides is a genus of sedges (Cyperaceae), native to Europe and adjoining areas, and introduced elsewhere. It was split off from Scirpus.

== Species ==
Four species are accepted:

- Scirpoides burkei (C.B.Clarke) Goetgh., Muasya & D.A.Simpson
- Scirpoides holoschoenus (L.) Soják
- Scirpoides mexicana (C.B.Clarke ex Britton) Goetgh. ex C.S.Reid & J.R.Carter
- Scirpoides varia Browning
