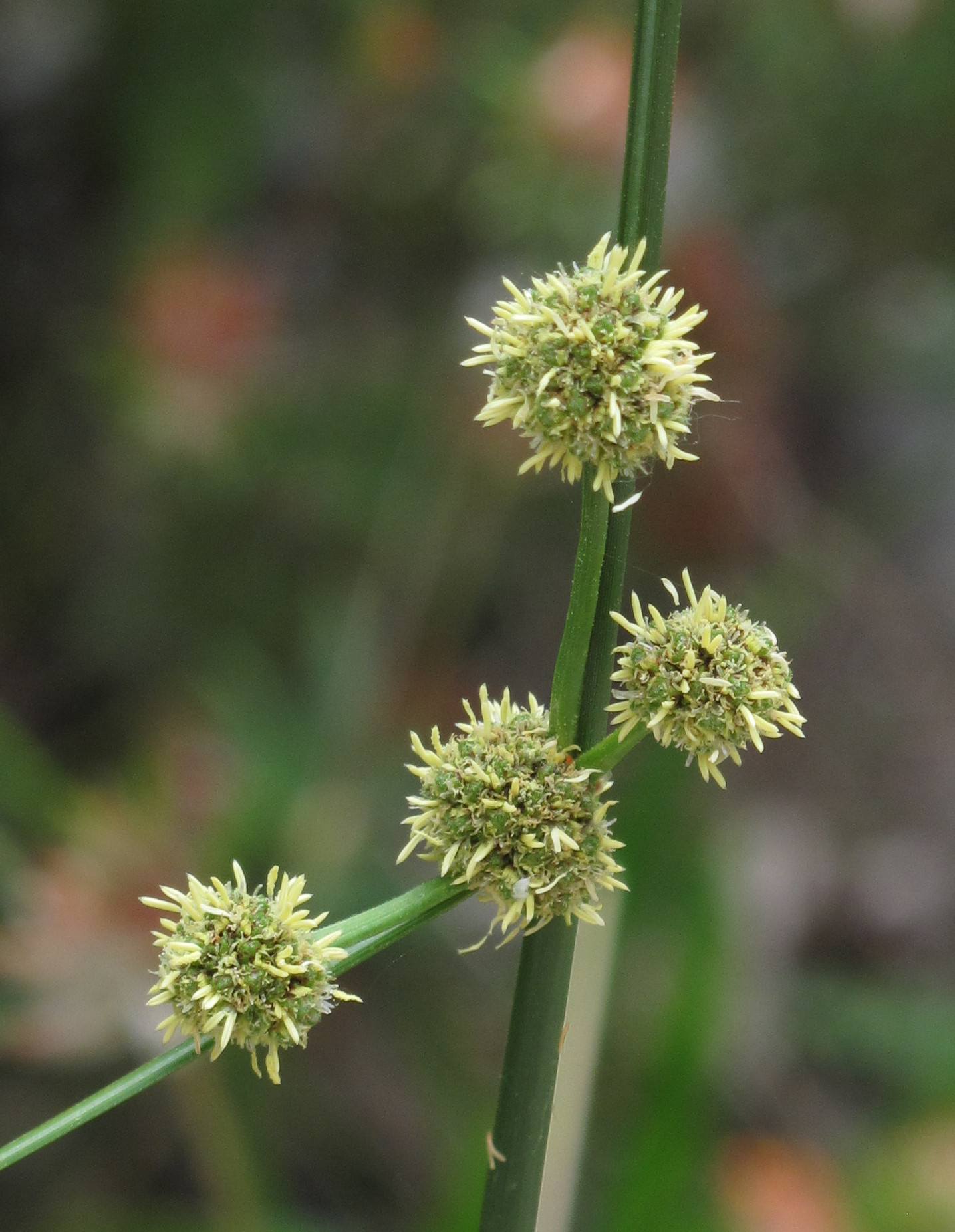

Scientific classification
- Kingdom: Plantae
- Clade: Tracheophytes
- Clade: Angiosperms
- Clade: Monocots
- Clade: Commelinids
- Order: Poales
- Family: Cyperaceae
- Genus: Scirpoides
- Species: S. holoschoenus

Binomial name
- Scirpoides holoschoenus (L.) Soják

Synonyms
- Holoschoenus vulgaris; Scirpus holoschoenus

= Scirpoides holoschoenus =

Species of plant

Scirpoides holoschoenus is a species of perennial sedge in the family Cyperaceae, commonly called the roundhead bulrush. It has a self-supporting growth form and simple, broad leaves. They are associated with freshwater habitat. Individuals can grow to 0.75 m.

== Sources ==
This article incorporates text from a free content work. Licensed under CC0 (license statement/permission). Text taken from Scirpus holoschoenus. Encyclopedia of Life.
