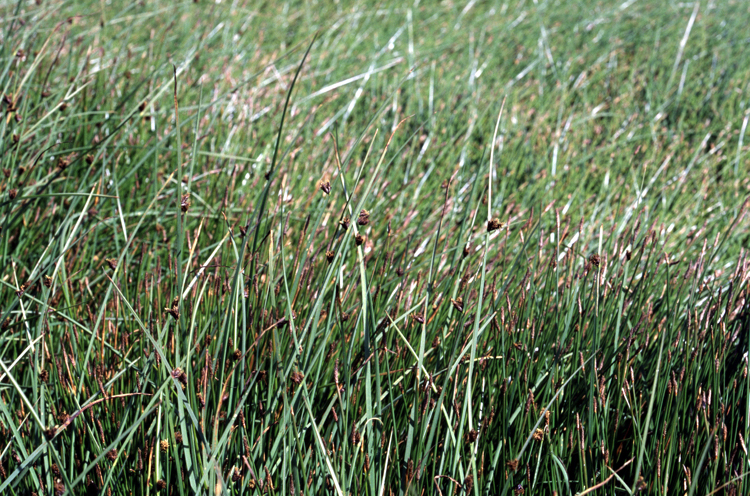

Scientific classification
- Kingdom: Plantae
- Clade: Tracheophytes
- Clade: Angiosperms
- Clade: Monocots
- Clade: Commelinids
- Order: Poales
- Family: Cyperaceae
- Genus: Schoenoplectus
- Species: S. americanus

Binomial name
- Schoenoplectus americanus (Pers.) Volkart ex Schinz & R. Keller

Synonyms
- Scirpus americanus Scirpus olneyi

= Schoenoplectus americanus =

Species of grass-like plant

Schoenoplectus americanus (syn. Scirpus americanus) is an American species of flowering plant in the sedge family known by the common names chairmaker's bulrush and Olney's three-square bulrush.

== Description ==
This perennial herb easily exceeds 2 metres (6 1/2 ft) in height. The stiff stems are sharply three-angled and usually very concave between the edges. Each plant has three or fewer leaves which are short and narrow. The inflorescence is a small head of several spikelets which may be brown to bright orange, red, purplish, or pale and translucent. They have hairy edges. The fruit is a brown achene. The plant reproduces sexually by seed and colonies spread via vegetative reproduction, sprouting from the rhizomes.

== Distribution and habitat ==
It is native to the Americas, where it is known from Alaska to Nova Scotia and all the way into southern South America; it is most common along the East and Gulf Coasts of the United States and in parts of the western states. It grows in many types of coastal and inland wetland habitat, as well as sagebrush, desert scrub, chaparral, and plains.

== Ecology ==
This plant, particularly the rhizomes, are a food source of muskrat, nutria, and other animals; it is strongly favored by the snow goose in its wintering grounds.

== Uses ==
Native American groups used this plant for many purposes, including food, basketry, and hatmaking. It is used for revegetation projects in salt marsh habitat in its native range. It is a model organism in the study of salt marsh ecology and its response to climate change (currently global warming).
