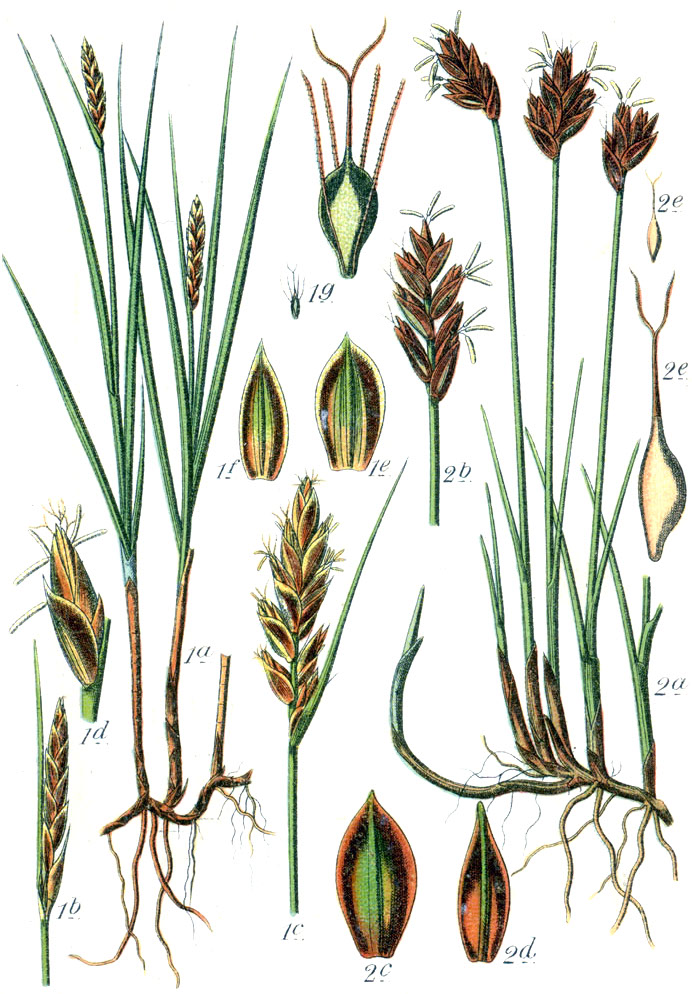
- Botanical illustration of Blysmus compressus and Blysmus rufus.

Scientific classification
- Kingdom: Plantae
- Clade: Embryophytes
- Clade: Tracheophytes
- Clade: Angiosperms
- Clade: Monocots
- Clade: Commelinids
- Order: Poales
- Family: Cyperaceae
- Genus: Blysmus; Panz. ex Schult.

Species
- See text

Synonyms
- Blysmopsis Oteng-Yeb.; Leptolepis Boeckeler; Nomochloa P.Beauv. ex T.Lestib.

= Blysmus =

Genus of plants

Blysmus is a genus of sedges of the family Cyperaceae, found in temperate regions across the Northern Hemisphere.

== Species ==
Four species are currently accepted.

- Blysmus compressus (L.) Panz. ex Link
- Blysmus mongolicola Kitag.
- Blysmus rufus (Huds.) Link
- Blysmus sinocompressus Tang & F.T.Wang
