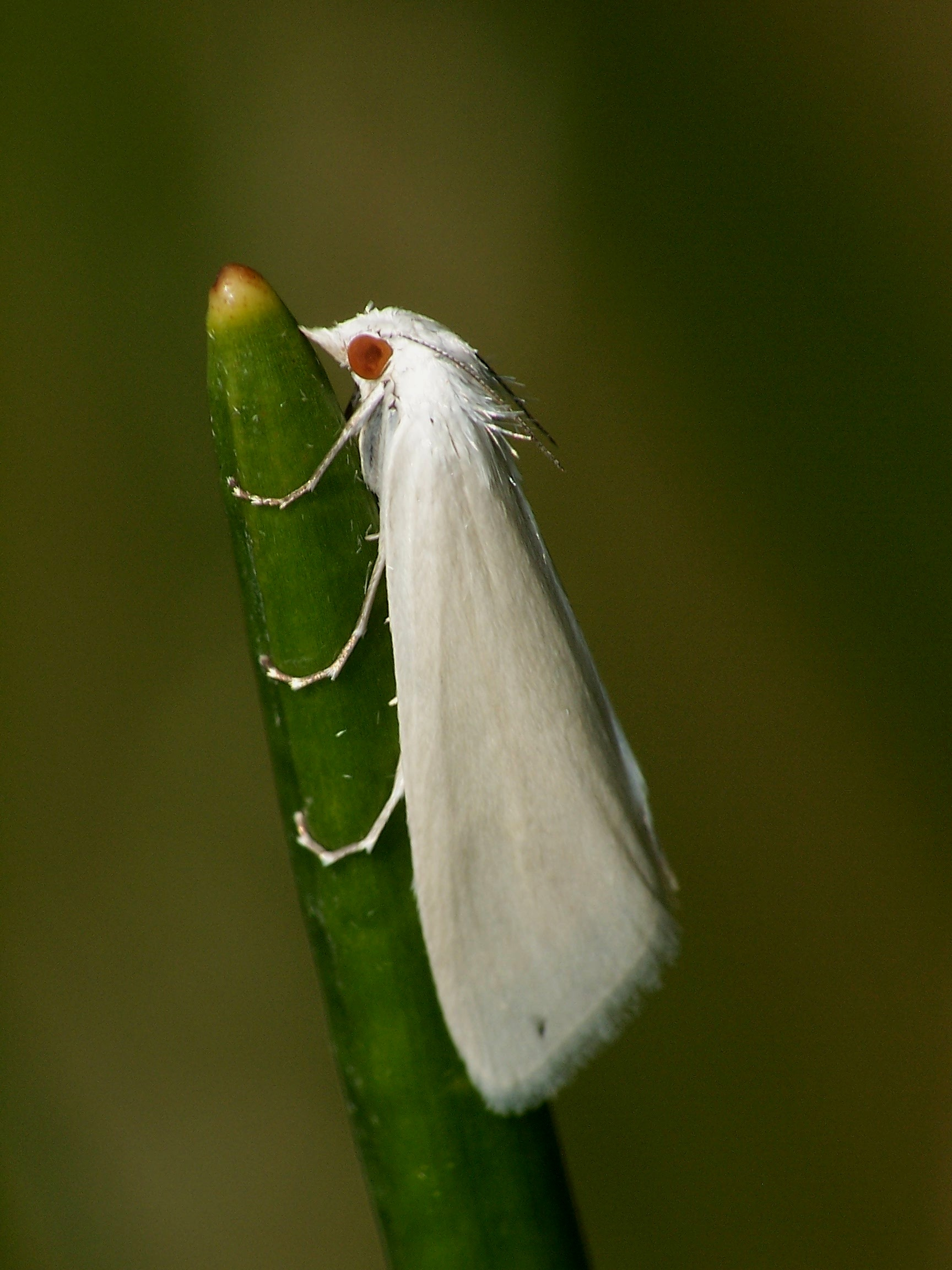

Scientific classification
- Domain: Eukaryota
- Kingdom: Animalia
- Phylum: Arthropoda
- Class: Insecta
- Order: Lepidoptera
- Family: Crambidae
- Genus: Scirpophaga
- Species: S. praelata

Binomial name
- Scirpophaga praelata (Scopoli, 1763)

Synonyms
- Phalaena praelata Scopoli, 1763; Bombyx alba Geyer in Hübner, 1828; Phalaena (Alucita) latidactyla Hübner, 1790; Scirpophaga albinella var. grisea Guenée, 1845; Scirpophaga cinerea Zeller, 1863; Scirpophaga limnochares Common, 1960; Tinea dubia Rossi, 1790; Tinea phantasmatella Hübner, 1796; Tinea phantasmella Treitschke, 1832; Thopeutis phantasmatalis Hübner, 1825

= Scirpophaga praelata =

Species of moth

Scirpophaga praelata is a species of moth of the family Crambidae. It is found in most of Europe (except Ireland, Great Britain, Portugal, the Benelux, Germany, Fennoscandia, Estonia and Latvia), Russia, Turkey, Iran, Syria, Lebanon, North Africa, Japan, Taiwan, China and Australia.

The wingspan is 28–32 mm.

The larvae feed on Scirpus species, including Scirpus lacustris, Scirpus validus, Scirpus mucronatus and Scirpus littoralis.
