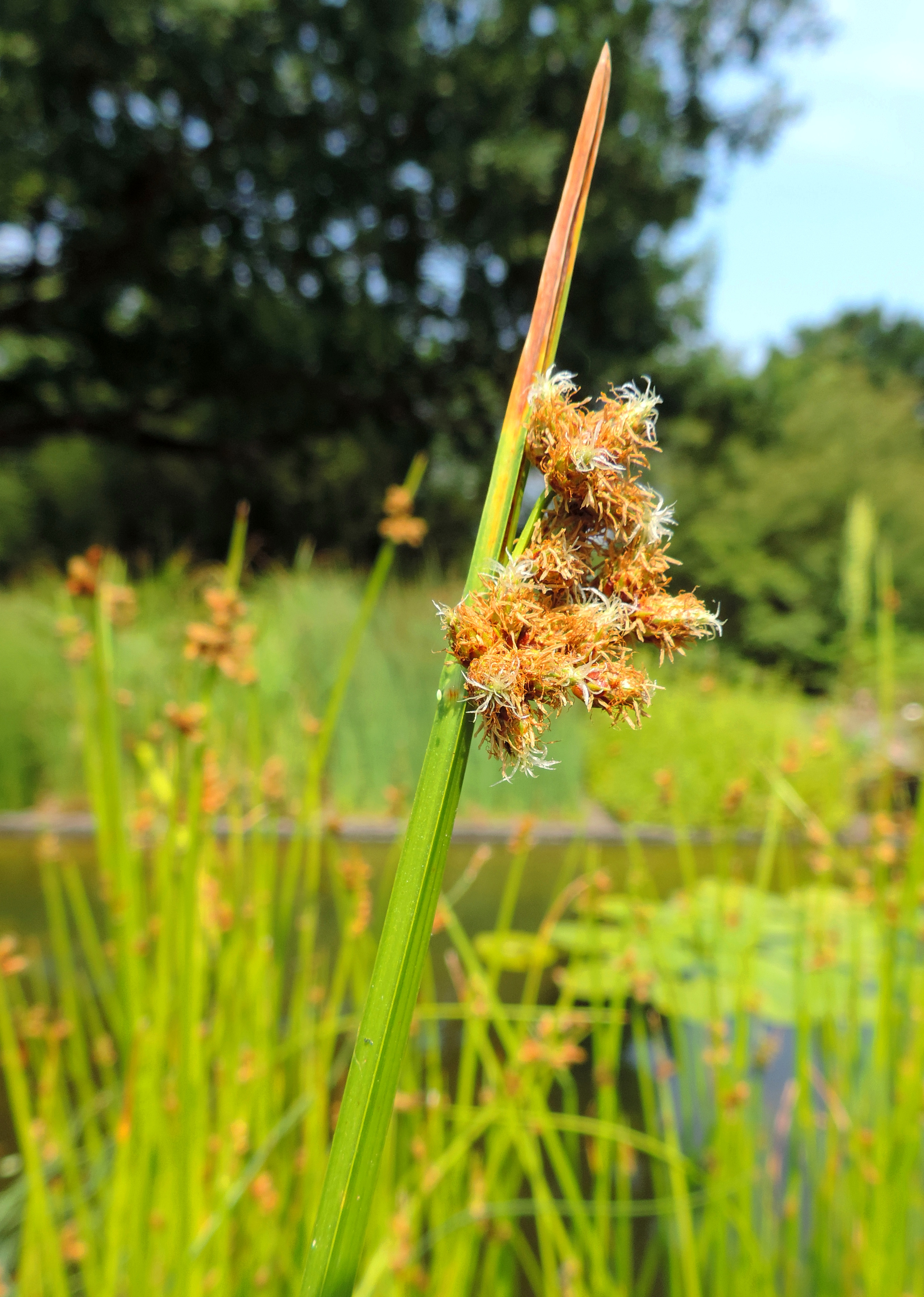

Conservation status
- Least Concern (IUCN 3.1)

Scientific classification
- Kingdom: Plantae
- Clade: Tracheophytes
- Clade: Angiosperms
- Clade: Monocots
- Clade: Commelinids
- Order: Poales
- Family: Cyperaceae
- Genus: Schoenoplectus
- Species: S. triqueter

Binomial name
- Schoenoplectus triqueter (L.) Palla
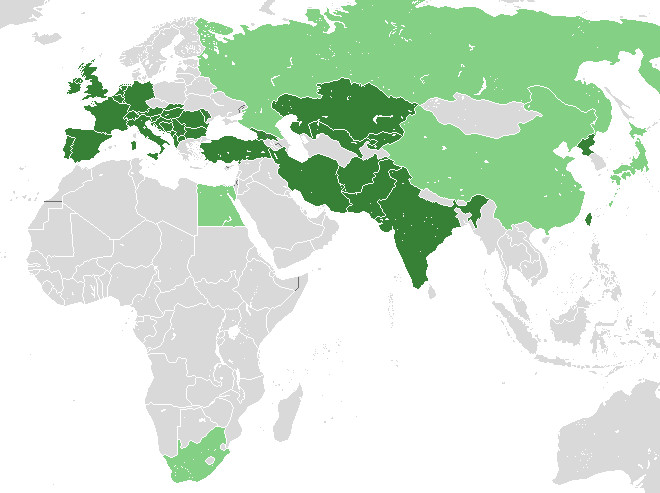
- Present Present in some parts Not present

Synonyms
- Scirpus triqueter L.

= Schoenoplectus triqueter =

Species of sedge

Schoenoplectus triqueter, commonly known as the triangular club-rush, is a species of sedge which lives in temperate Eurasian wetlands, on muddy shores and river margins. It is found across Eurasia, as well as in South Africa, and has been introduced to North America on the west coast. Because of its tolerance of salty habitats, it is considered a halophyte, but plants which were subjected to a high salinity level (10 parts per thousand) in an experiment were noticeably stunted.

== Description ==
Schoenoplectus triqueter is a medium-sized sedge, growing 50–150 centimetres (1.6–4.9 ft) tall, with long, thick (2–10 mm in diameter) rhizomes and thin stems (2–4 mm in diameter). The sedge flowers and fruits in summer; the fruit are small, brown, and bristly. The flowers are wind-pollinated.

S. triqueter spreads both asexually through rhizomes—underground stems which send up new shoots—and sexually through seeds; it spreads by seed far more in cultivation than in the wild. In fact, no seeds were found during surveys of the wild population around the Shannon River.

=== Effects of salinity ===
A 2005 study looked at the effects of varying levels of salinity on S. triqueter's growth habits. The plants subjected to a salinity level of 10 ppt had their growth noticeably stunted relative to the control sample. The plants at 2 ppt, however, were 21% taller with 67%-heavier rhizomes than the control sample. Another study, in Punjab, found that, in general, the length of the plants' roots consistently increased as the salinity of the soil was raised. Other modifications to the root structure, such as an increase in the area of the vascular bundles as the salinity increased. The study concluded that, of the three species it had looked at (S. triqueter, S. juncoides, and S. lacustris) S. triqueter was the most salt-tolerant, due to its root adapdations. The species is considered a halophyte.

== Distribution and conservation ==
S. triqueter inhabits wetlands, shores, and muddy river banks. The species was classified as "Least Concern" by the IUCN in 2013. In some regions, it is classified as endangered, and the species has been extirpated from the Czech Republic. S. triqueter is also known to be in decline in north-central Europe and in the British Isles. However, it grows prolifically enough in China that it is considered a pest in rice paddies.

=== British Isles ===
In the British Isles, although many populations have been lost due to construction projects and land reclamation, populations in Ireland around the River Shannon persist in some numbers. The species is classified as critically endangered by the Botanical Society of Britain and Ireland. It has been suggested that its distribution is restricted due to the plants' low tolerance of salinity. The main factors driving the species' decline are habitat loss, soil erosion, hybridisation with other related species, and the spread of Phragmites plants. The last known English population, on the River Tamar, died in 2012, but the species has been successfully re-introduced at ten sites.

=== Mainland Europe ===
In Portugal, the species is classified as vulnerable.

=== North America ===
In North America, S. triqueter has been introduced in and around the lower Columbia River tidal region, where it is known to produce fertile hybrids with S. tabernaemontani. It is found in southwestern Washington state and adjacent parts of Oregon.
