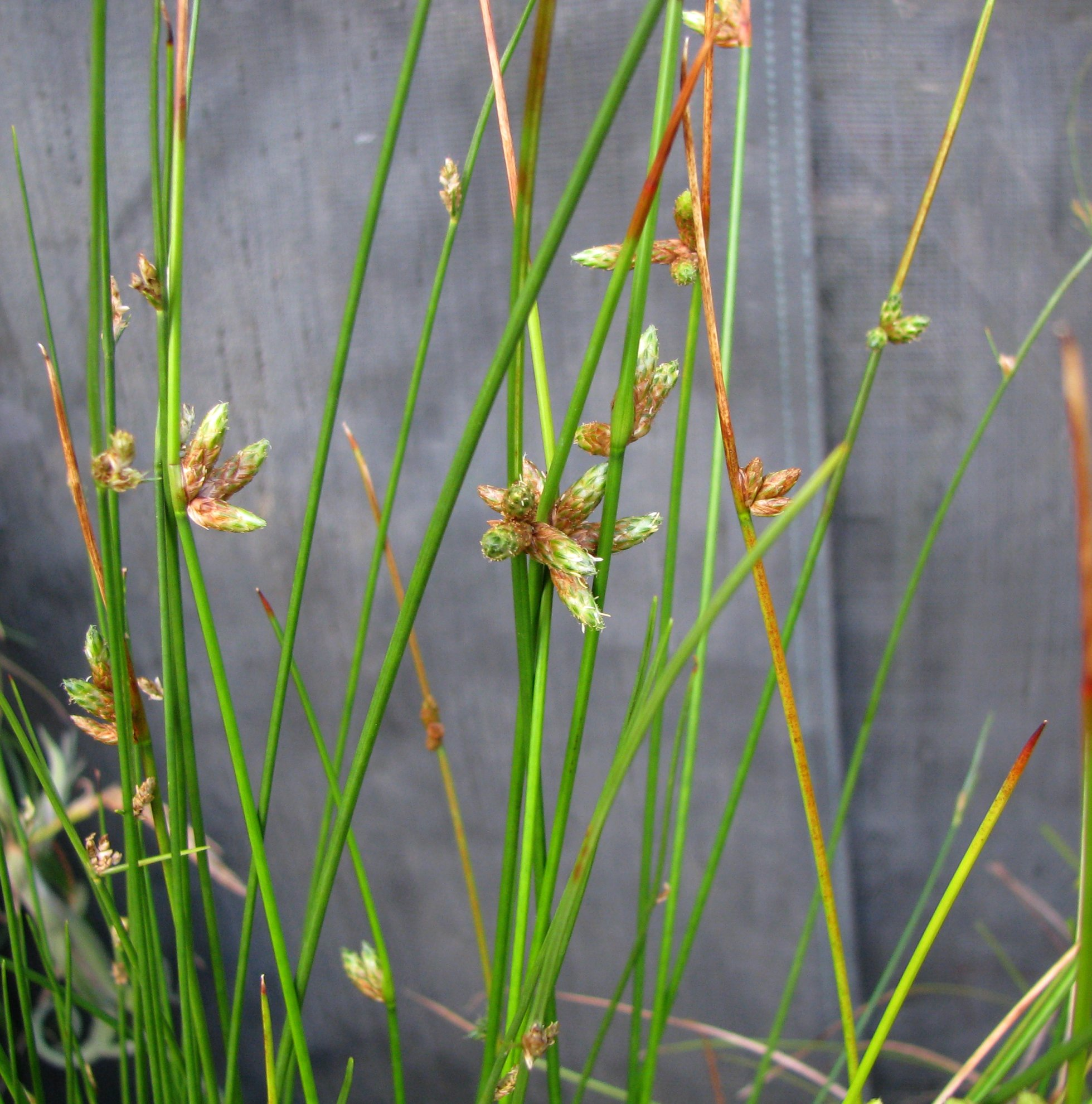

Conservation status
- Secure (NatureServe)

Scientific classification
- Kingdom: Plantae
- Clade: Tracheophytes
- Clade: Angiosperms
- Clade: Monocots
- Clade: Commelinids
- Order: Poales
- Family: Cyperaceae
- Genus: Schoenoplectiella
- Species: S. juncoides

Binomial name
- Schoenoplectiella juncoides (Roxb.) Lye

Synonyms
- 17 Synonyms: Hymenochaeta juncoides (Roxb.) Nakai (1952); Schoenoplectiella juncoides var. rockii (Kük.) Hayas. (2012); Schoenoplectus juncoides (Roxb.) Palla (1888); S. juncoides subsp. ohwianus (T.Koyama) Soják (1972); S. juncoides subsp. rockii (Kük.) Soják (1972); S. ohwianus (T.Koyama) Holub (1976); Scirpus donianus Spreng. (1827); S. junciformis Nees (1834); S. juncoides Roxb. (1820); S. juncoides var. ohwianus (T.Koyama) T.Koyama (1958); S. luzonensis J.Presl & C.Presl (1828); S. ohwianus T.Koyama (1956); S. quadrangulus D.Don (1825); S. rockii Kük. (1920); S. subquadrangularis Makino (1931); S. supinus var. elatior Boeckeler (1870); S. timorensis Kunth (1837)

= Schoenoplectiella juncoides =

Species of grass-like plant

Schoenoplectiella juncoides is a sedge (a member of the Cyperaceae family), native to east Asia and Oceania. It is a serious weed of rice paddies.

S. juncoides, also known as Kaluha or rock bulrush, belong to the Cyperaceae family. It is indigenous to Hawaiʻi but is also native to Madagascar and North America. Kaluha is not like the average flower species, as it does not grow bright, scented flowers. Instead, it grows tall leaves with spiky flowers annually. This species may improve this environment in ways such as preventing erosion and providing a habitat for some species. In other environments such as rice fields, it is considered invasive and could reduce crop yields.

This sedge was first described by William Roxburgh as Scirpus junc(e)oides in 1814, in 1888, Eduard Palla transferred it to the genus Schoenoplectus and the accepted name was Schoenoplectus juncoides for many years. In 2003, it was transferred to the new genus Schoenoplectiella by Kåre Arnstein Lye.

It was discovered in Asia, Africa, and the United States. S. juncoides is a species that is native to Hawaii and is usually found on high elevations near wetlands. It was originally discovered on Kaua'i and this species never colonized the other Islands of Hawaii.

The plant may grow up to 60 centimetres (24 in) high with leaves that are long and narrow. Although this species does have flowers, they don't resemble the average flower with intense colors or scents. Kaluha's flowers are small spikes with a brown or greenish color. The average flower grows singly, however, Kaluha grows in clumps. The fruiting body, an achene, is considered a dry fruit that does not open at maturity to release seeds. The achenes fall from the leaves and are carried to another location which helps with the colonization of the species.

Although this plant usually grows on high elevations, 180–1,300 m (590–4,270 ft), it thrives in wet or moist conditions. They are usually found near ponds, rivers, and swamps. The root system and structure of this species may prevent erosion by anchoring the soil in place which leads to the improvement of the water quality. Since this species is usually found near bodies of water, it slows the speed of runoff water which allows pollutants to be filtered before entering the main water source. Kaluha also provides a habitat for many species like birds, insects, and invertebrates by providing a shelter and source of food. In major rice fields, this species may become invasive. There are certain chemicals or pesticides that farmers use to prevent a plant from becoming invasive. However, farmers are also able to reduce the amount of vegetative sprouts that grow by flooding the field with water, which is also known as wet puddling. Although this could have negative impacts on the soil, it prevents the species from becoming invasive.

== Human uses ==
S. juncoides are used as a food source in some countries by using the seeds from the fruiting body to make bread or porridge. S. juncoides can also be used for wildlife restoration, since it prevents erosion, provides more habitat for wildlife, and improves water quality. Some cultures also use the leaves of Kaluha for crafts like weaving baskets, hats, or art.

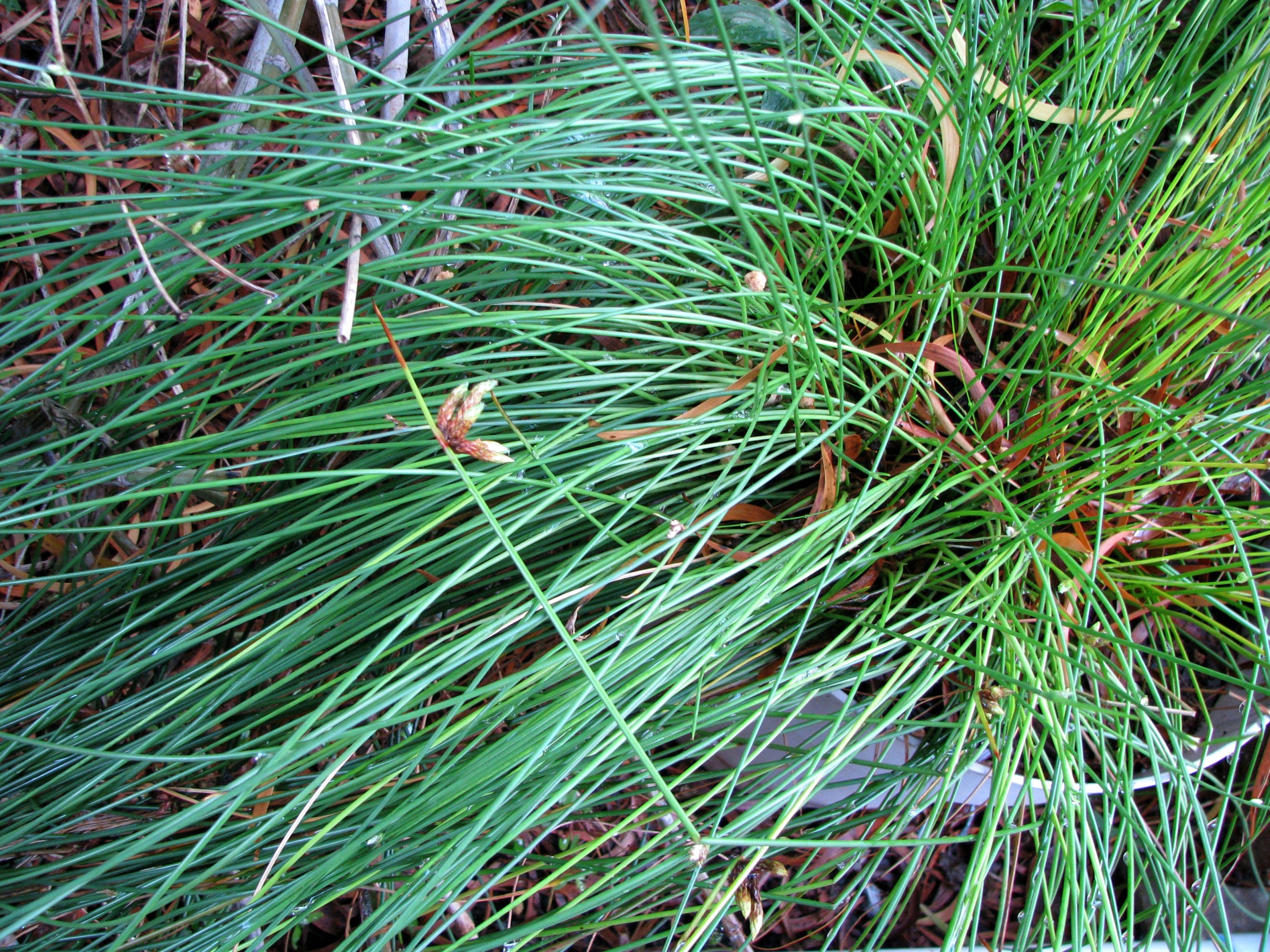

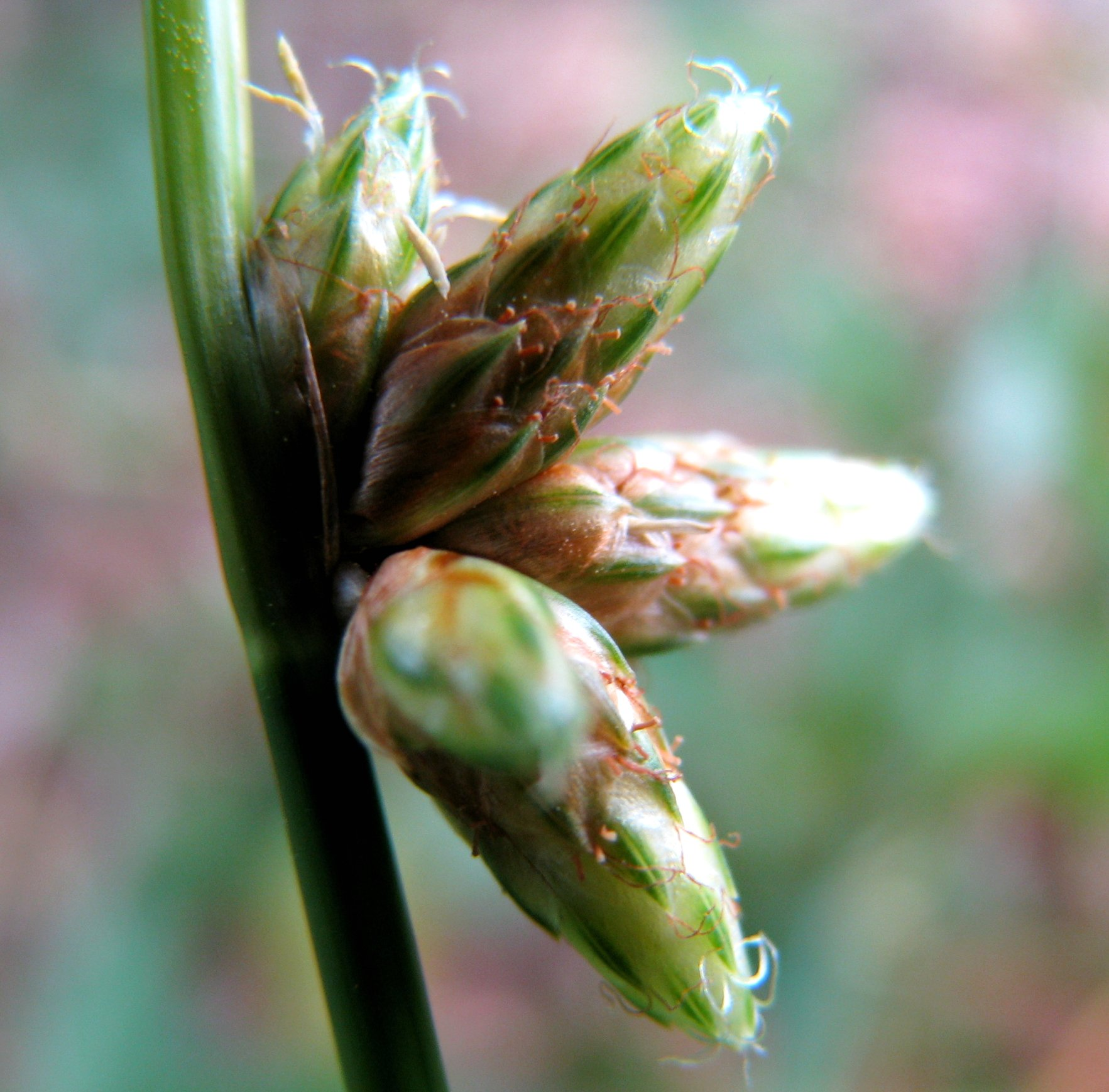

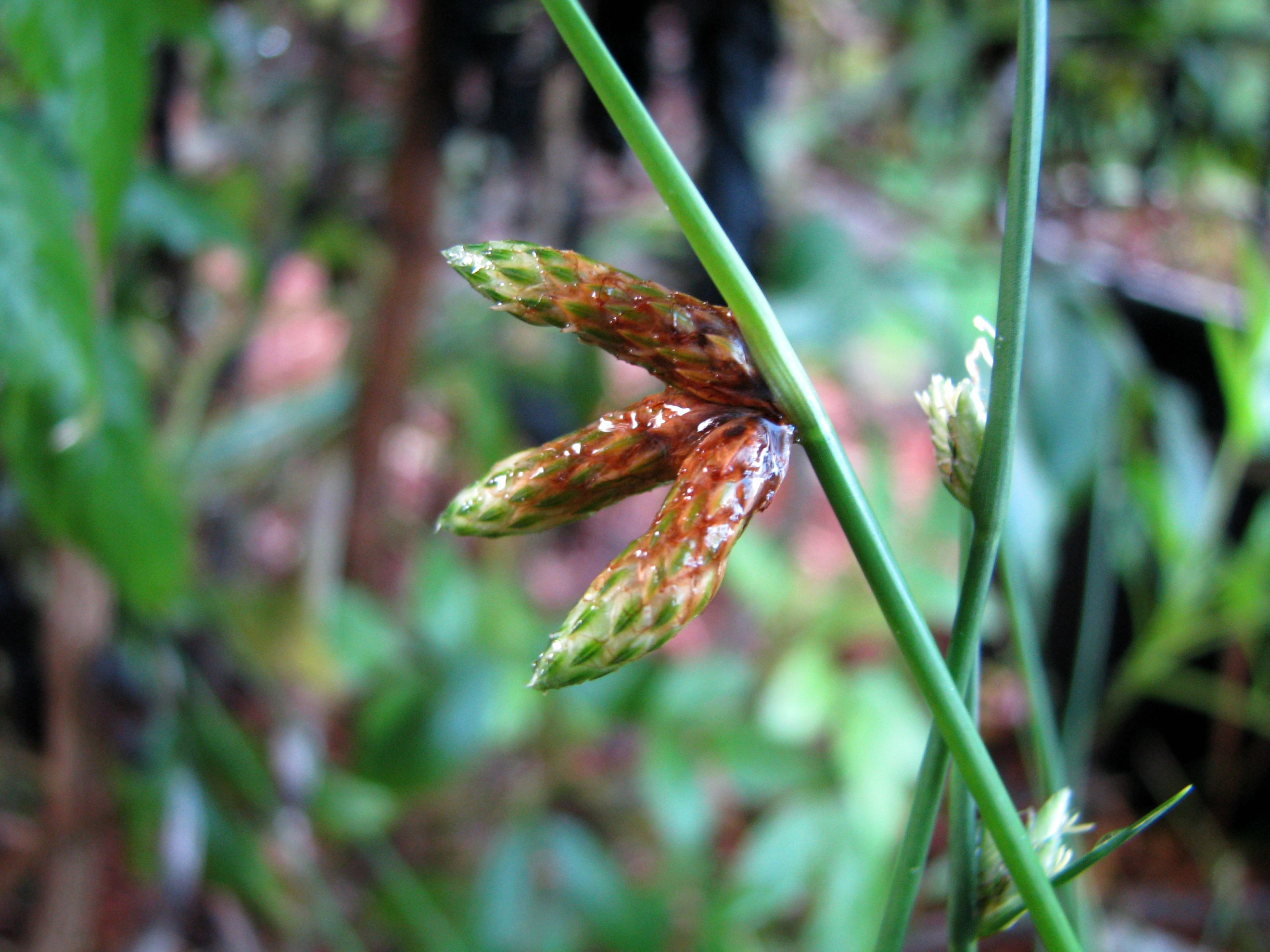
