= Cyperus longi-involucratus =

Scientific classification
- Kingdom: Plantae
- Clade: Tracheophytes
- Clade: Angiosperms
- Clade: Monocots
- Clade: Commelinids
- Order: Poales
- Family: Cyperaceae
- Genus: Cyperus
- Species: C. longi-involucratus

Binomial name
- Cyperus longi-involucratus Lye, 1983

Species of sedge

Cyperus longi-involucratus is a species of sedge that is native to parts of Tanzania.

== See also ==
- List of Cyperus species
