= Cyperus afrodunensis =

Conservation status
- Endangered (IUCN 3.1)

Scientific classification
- Kingdom: Plantae
- Clade: Tracheophytes
- Clade: Angiosperms
- Clade: Monocots
- Clade: Commelinids
- Order: Poales
- Family: Cyperaceae
- Genus: Cyperus
- Species: C. afrodunensis

Binomial name
- Cyperus afrodunensis Lye

Species of plant native to Africa

Cyperus afrodunensis is a species of sedge that is native to an area in southern Somalia and coastal parts of Kenya.

The species was first formally described by the botanist Kåre Arnstein Lye in 1983.

== See also ==
- List of Cyperus species
