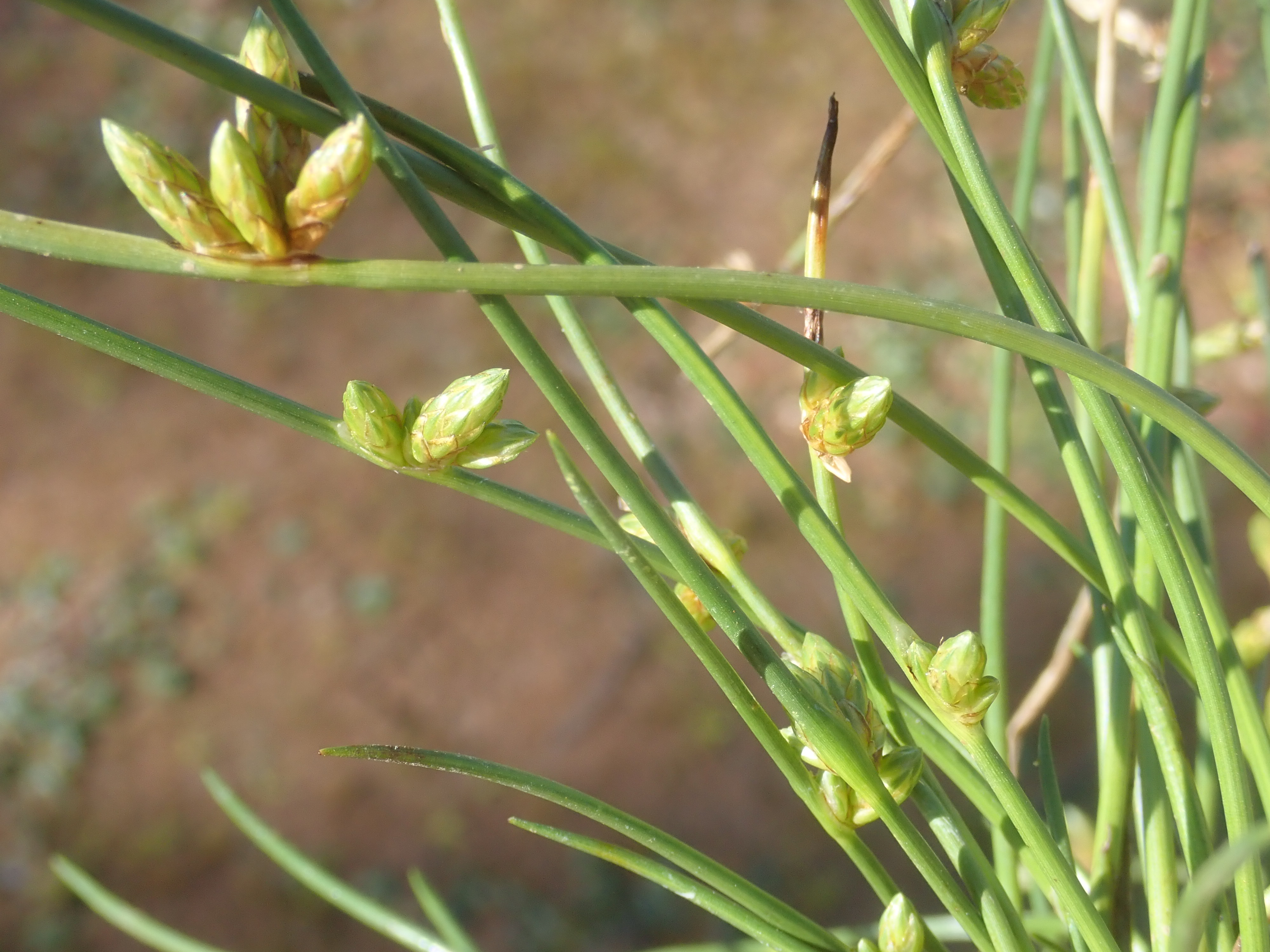
- Schoenoplectiella dissachantha

Scientific classification
- Kingdom: Plantae
- Clade: Tracheophytes
- Clade: Angiosperms
- Clade: Monocots
- Clade: Commelinids
- Order: Poales
- Family: Cyperaceae
- Genus: Schoenoplectiella; Lye

= Schoenoplectiella =

Genus of grass-like plants

Schoenoplectiella is a genus of flowering plants in the sedge family. It has a nearly-cosmopolitan distribution. The genus was first described in 2003 by Kaare Arnstein Lye, and the type species is Schoenoplectiella articulata. There are no synonyms.

== Species list ==
According to Plants of the World Online, there are 52 accepted species.

- Schoenoplectiella aberrans (Cherm.) Lye
- Schoenoplectiella articulata (L.) Lye
- Schoenoplectiella blakei (Hayas.) Hayas.
- Schoenoplectiella bucharica (Roshev.) Hayas.
- Schoenoplectiella chen-moui (Tang & F.T.Wang) Hayas.
- Schoenoplectiella chuana (Tang & F.T.Wang) Hayas.
- Schoenoplectiella clemensiae (Kük.) Hayas.
- Schoenoplectiella dissachantha (S.T.Blake) Lye
- Schoenoplectiella erecta (Poir.) Lye
- Schoenoplectiella fohaiensis (Tang & F.T.Wang) Hayas.
- Schoenoplectiella fuscorubens (T.Koyama) Hayas.
- Schoenoplectiella gemmifera (C.Sato, T.Maeda & Uchino) Hayas.
- Schoenoplectiella hallii (A.Gray) Lye
- Schoenoplectiella heterophylla (Schuyler) Lye
- Schoenoplectiella hondoensis (Ohwi) Hayas.
- Schoenoplectiella hooperae (J.Raynal) Lye
- Schoenoplectiella hotarui (Ohwi) J.Jung & H.K.Choi
- Schoenoplectiella humillima (Benth.) Shiels, Glon & Monfils
- Schoenoplectiella × igaensis (T.Koyama) Hayas.
- Schoenoplectiella × intermedia Hayas.
- Schoenoplectiella jingmenensis (Tang & F.T.Wang) Hayas.
- Schoenoplectiella juncea (Willd.) Lye
- Schoenoplectiella × juncohotarui (Yashiro) Hayas.
- Schoenoplectiella juncoides (Roxb.) Lye
- Schoenoplectiella kandawlayensis (T.Koyama) Hayas.
- Schoenoplectiella komarovii (Roshev.) J.Jung & H.K.Choi
- Schoenoplectiella laevis (S.T.Blake) Lye
- Schoenoplectiella lateriflora (J.F.Gmel.) Lye
- choenoplectiella leucantha (Boeckeler) Lye
- Schoenoplectiella lineolata (Franch. & Sav.) J.Jung & H.K.Choi
- Schoenoplectiella × magrathii M.Smith & P.M.McKenzie
- Schoenoplectiella melanosperma (C.A.Mey.) Danylyk, Olshanskyi & Zhygalova
- Schoenoplectiella microglumis (Lye) Lye
- Schoenoplectiella mucronata (L.) J.Jung & H.K.Choi
- Schoenoplectiella multiseta (Hayas. & C.Sato) Hayas.
- Schoenoplectiella naikiana (Wad.Khan) Hayas.
- Schoenoplectiella × oguraensis (T.Koyama) Hayas.
- Schoenoplectiella oligoseta (A.E.Kozhevn.) Hayas.
- Schoenoplectiella orthorhizomata (Kats.Arai & Miyam.) Hayas.
- Schoenoplectiella × osoreyamensis (M.Kikuchi) Hayas.
- Schoenoplectiella oxyjulos (S.S.Hooper) Lye
- Schoenoplectiella patentiglumis (Hayas.) Hayas.
- Schoenoplectiella perrieri (Cherm.) Lye
- Schoenoplectiella praelongata (Poir.) Lye
- Schoenoplectiella proxima (Steud.) Lye
- Schoenoplectiella purshiana (Fernald) Lye
- Schoenoplectiella rechingeri (Kukkonen) Hayas.
- Schoenoplectiella reducta (Cherm.) Lye
- Schoenoplectiella roylei (Nees) Lye
- Schoenoplectiella saximontana (Fernald) Lye
- Schoenoplectiella schoofii (Beetle) Hayas.
- Schoenoplectiella senegalensis (Steud.) Lye
- Schoenoplectiella smithii (A.Gray) Hayas.
- Schoenoplectiella subbisetosa (T.Koyama) Hayas.
- Schoenoplectiella supina (L.) Lye
- Schoenoplectiella trapezoidea (Koidz.) J.Jung & H.K.Choi
- Schoenoplectiella × uzenensis (Ohwi ex T.Koyama) Hayas.
- Schoenoplectiella vohemarensis (Cherm.) Lye
- Schoenoplectiella wallichii (Nees) Lye
- Schoenoplectiella × yashiroi J.Oda & Nagam.
