= Carex tenuior =

Scientific classification
- Kingdom: Plantae
- Clade: Tracheophytes
- Clade: Angiosperms
- Clade: Monocots
- Clade: Commelinids
- Order: Poales
- Family: Cyperaceae
- Genus: Carex
- Species: C. tenuior

Binomial name
- Carex tenuior T.Koyama & T.I.Chuang

Species of grass-like plant

Carex tenuior is a perennial sedge of the Cyperaceae family that is native to the Ryukyu Islands south of Japan.

== See also ==
- List of Carex species
