= Cyperus aureoalatus =

Scientific classification
- Kingdom: Plantae
- Clade: Tracheophytes
- Clade: Angiosperms
- Clade: Monocots
- Clade: Commelinids
- Order: Poales
- Family: Cyperaceae
- Genus: Cyperus
- Species: C. aureoalatus

Binomial name
- Cyperus aureoalatus Lye

Species of plant native to Africa

Cyperus aureoalatus is a species of sedge that has been found to occur in Somalia, Uganda and Ethiopia.

The species was first formally described by the botanist Kåre Arnstein Lye in 1995.

== See also ==
- List of Cyperus species
