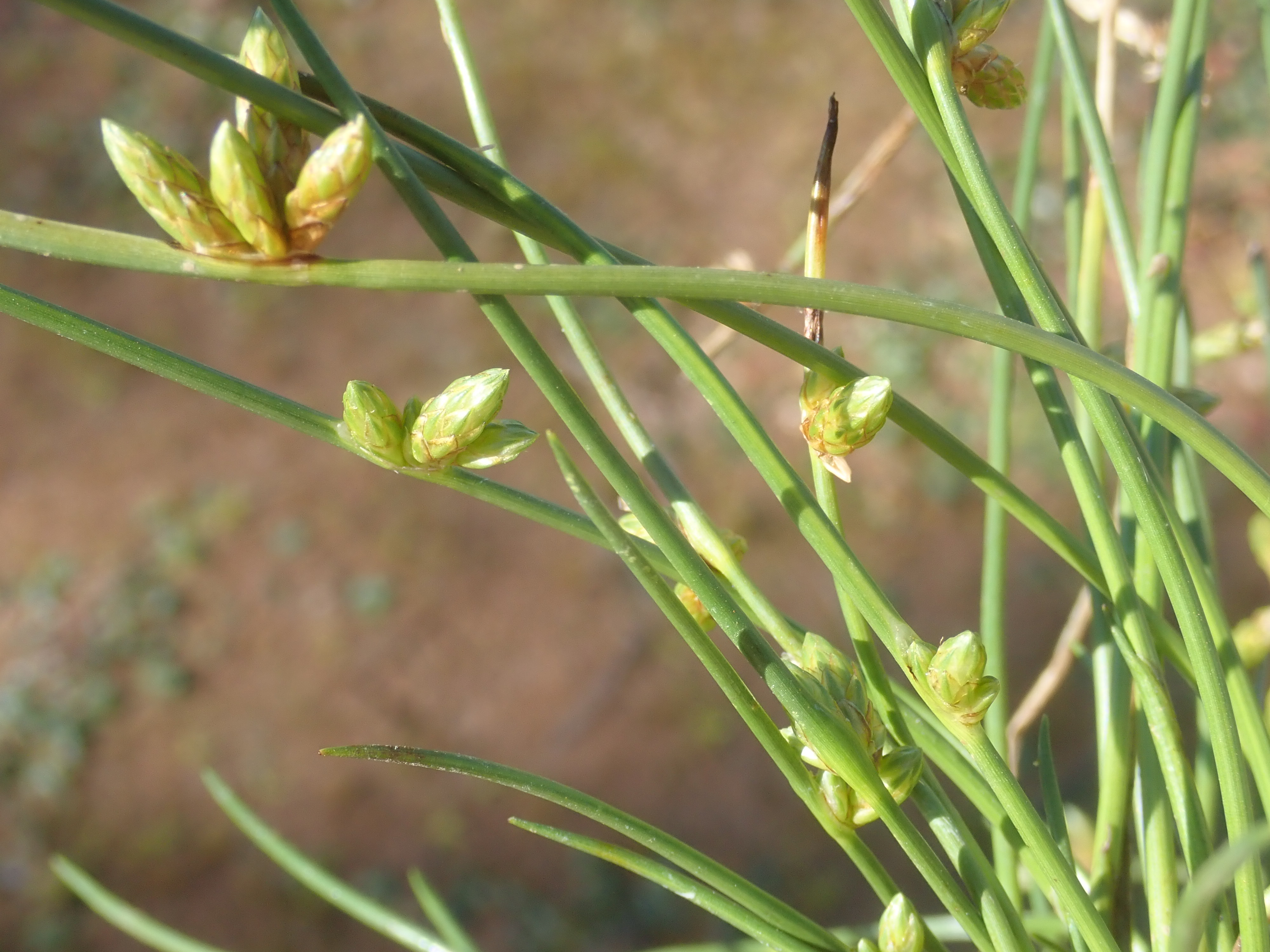

Scientific classification
- Kingdom: Plantae
- Clade: Tracheophytes
- Clade: Angiosperms
- Clade: Monocots
- Clade: Commelinids
- Order: Poales
- Family: Cyperaceae
- Genus: Schoenoplectiella
- Species: S. dissachantha

Binomial name
- Schoenoplectiella dissachantha (S.T.Blake) Lye

= Schoenoplectiella dissachantha =

Species of grass-like plant

Schoenoplectiella dissachantha is a sedge (member of the Cyperaceae family), native to all mainland states of Australia (and to the Northern Territory).

This sedge was first described by Stanley Thatcher Blake as Scirpus dissachanthus in 1946, but was transferred to the genus, Schoenoplectiella in 2003 by Kaare Arnstein Lye.
