= Carex chinoi =

Scientific classification
- Kingdom: Plantae
- Clade: Tracheophytes
- Clade: Angiosperms
- Clade: Monocots
- Clade: Commelinids
- Order: Poales
- Family: Cyperaceae
- Genus: Carex
- Species: C. chinoi

Binomial name
- Carex chinoi Ohwi ex. T.Koyama

Species of plant

Carex chinoi is a tussock-forming species of perennial sedge in the family Cyperaceae. It is native to parts of Japan.

It was first described in 1957 by Jisaburo Ohwi in an article by Tetsuo Koyama .

== See also ==
- List of Carex species
