= Cyperus afromontanus =

Conservation status
- Data Deficient (IUCN 3.1)

Scientific classification
- Kingdom: Plantae
- Clade: Tracheophytes
- Clade: Angiosperms
- Clade: Monocots
- Clade: Commelinids
- Order: Poales
- Family: Cyperaceae
- Genus: Cyperus
- Species: C. afromontanus

Binomial name
- Cyperus afromontanus Lye

Species of plant endemic to Uganda

Cyperus afromontanus is a species of sedge that is endemic to an area in Uganda. It is "a perennial or rhizomatous geophyte and grows primarily in the subtropical biome." The species was first formally described by the botanist Kåre Arnstein Lye in 1983.

== See also ==
- List of Cyperus species
