= Cyperus rheophyticus =

Scientific classification
- Kingdom: Plantae
- Clade: Tracheophytes
- Clade: Angiosperms
- Clade: Monocots
- Clade: Commelinids
- Order: Poales
- Family: Cyperaceae
- Genus: Cyperus
- Species: C. rheophyticus

Binomial name
- Cyperus rheophyticus Lye

Species of plant endemic to Cameroon

Cyperus rheophyticus is a species of sedge that is thought to be endemic to Cameroon.

The species was first formally described by the botanist Kåre Arnstein Lye in 2006.

== See also ==
- List of Cyperus species
