= Carex satakeana =

Scientific classification
- Kingdom: Plantae
- Clade: Tracheophytes
- Clade: Angiosperms
- Clade: Monocots
- Clade: Commelinids
- Order: Poales
- Family: Cyperaceae
- Genus: Carex
- Species: C. satakeana

Binomial name
- Carex satakeana T.Koyama

Species of grass-like plant

Carex satakeana is a perennial sedge of the Cyperaceae family that is native to Tibet.

The grass-like sedge has a sub-woody and short rhizome. The rigid, slender and erect culms have a smooth surface and are triangular in cross-section. The culms typically grow to a length of 5 to 30 cm (2.0 to 11.8 in) and are covered at the base by fibrous brown sheaths. The flat leaves have a pointed tip and tend to be shorter than the culms with linear blades that are 2 to 3 mm (0.079 to 0.118 in) wide.

== See also ==
- List of Carex species
