= Cyperus altochrysocephalus =

Scientific classification
- Kingdom: Plantae
- Clade: Tracheophytes
- Clade: Angiosperms
- Clade: Monocots
- Clade: Commelinids
- Order: Poales
- Family: Cyperaceae
- Genus: Cyperus
- Species: C. altochrysocephalus

Binomial name
- Cyperus altochrysocephalus Lye

Species of plant native to Africa

Cyperus altochrysocephalus is a species of sedge that is native to an area which includes parts of Angola and Zambia.

The species was first formally described by the botanist Kåre Arnstein Lye in 1988.

== See also ==
- List of Cyperus species
