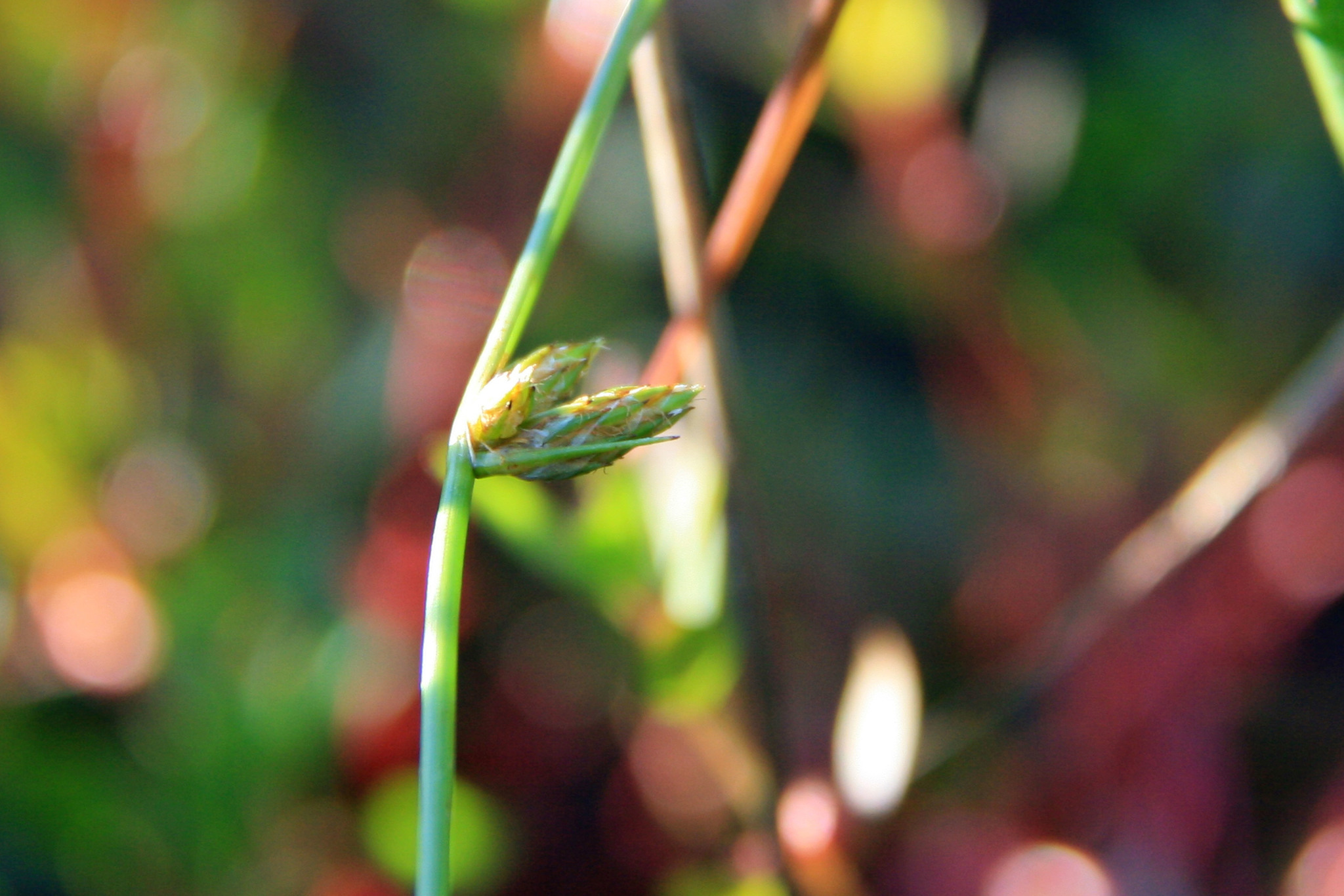

Conservation status
- Imperiled (NatureServe)

Scientific classification
- Kingdom: Plantae
- Clade: Tracheophytes
- Clade: Angiosperms
- Clade: Monocots
- Clade: Commelinids
- Order: Poales
- Family: Cyperaceae
- Genus: Schoenoplectiella
- Species: S. hallii

Binomial name
- Schoenoplectiella hallii (A.Gray) Lye

Synonyms
- Schoenoplectus hallii (A.Gray) S.G.Sm. Schoenoplectus supinus subsp. hallii (A.Gray) Soják; Scirpus hallii A.Gray; Scirpus supinus var. hallii (A.Gray) A.Gray; Scirpus uninodis var. hallii (A.Gray) Beetle

= Schoenoplectiella hallii =

Species of grass-like plant

Schoenoplectiella hallii is a species of flowering plant in the sedge family known by the common name Hall's bulrush. It is native to the United States, where it has a disjunct distribution, occurring in widely spaced locations throughout the Midwest and East. It is a rare plant.

This rhizomatous annual, or sometimes perennial, plant has stems which bend down or spread out instead of growing erect. They are up to 80 centimeters long, but often much shorter. The inflorescence contains a few spikelets which are up to 2 centimeters long by 2 to 3 millimeters wide. Some flowers may also be produced on short stems that barely emerge from the leaf sheaths later in the season.

This species grows in wet, sandy soils next to water bodies such as ponds and lakes. It is adapted to a habitat with fluctuating water levels. This fluctuation prevents many other types of plants from moving into the area and competing with the sedge.

Threats to this plant include anything that alters the hydrology of the habitat, for example, anything that prevents the fluctuating water levels and flooding that the plant requires. Other threats include loss of habitat to development or agriculture, livestock activity, off-road vehicle use, pollution, road maintenance, and habitat fragmentation.

== Taxonomy ==
This sedge was first described by Asa Gray in 1862 as Scirpus Hallii. Gray later (1867) described it as S. supinus var. Hallii. In 1995, the American botanist, Stanley Galen Smith, transferred it to the genus, Schoenoplectus, and Schoenoplectus hallii was the accepted name until it was transferred in 2003 to the genus, Schoenoplectiella, by Kåre Arnstein Lye.
