= Cyperus ossicaulis =

Scientific classification
- Kingdom: Plantae
- Clade: Tracheophytes
- Clade: Angiosperms
- Clade: Monocots
- Clade: Commelinids
- Order: Poales
- Family: Cyperaceae
- Genus: Cyperus
- Species: C. ossicaulis

Binomial name
- Cyperus ossicaulis Lye

Species of plant endemic to Somalia

Cyperus ossicaulis is a species of sedge that is endemic to an area in central Somalia.

The species was first formally described by the botanist Kåre Arnstein Lye in 1996.

== See also ==
- List of Cyperus species
