= Schoenoplectiella saximontana =

Scientific classification
- Kingdom: Plantae
- Clade: Tracheophytes
- Clade: Angiosperms
- Clade: Monocots
- Clade: Commelinids
- Order: Poales
- Family: Cyperaceae
- Genus: Schoenoplectiella
- Species: S. saximontana

Binomial name
- Schoenoplectiella saximontana (Fernald) Lye

Synonyms
- Schoenoplectus saximontanus (Fernald) J.Raynal; Schoenoplectus supinus subsp. saximontanus (Fernald) Soják; Scirpus bergsonii Schuyler; Scirpus saximontanus Fernald; Scirpus supinus var. saximontanus (Fernald) T.Koyama

Species of grass-like plant

Schoenoplectiella saximontana is a species of flowering plant in the sedge family known by the common name Rocky Mountain bulrush. It is native to North America, where it is known from several areas scattered throughout Canada, the United States, and Mexico. It grows in moist and wet habitat or shallow water, including disturbed places. It is an annual herb producing tufts of very thin, erect stems which reach about 30 centimeters in maximum height. The leaves sheath the stems and have short, narrow blades. The inflorescence is a cluster of several spikelets accompanied by a long, stiff, stemlike bract.
