= Cyperus flavoculmis =

Conservation status
- Critically Endangered (IUCN 3.1)

Scientific classification
- Kingdom: Plantae
- Clade: Tracheophytes
- Clade: Angiosperms
- Clade: Monocots
- Clade: Commelinids
- Order: Poales
- Family: Cyperaceae
- Genus: Cyperus
- Species: C. flavoculmis

Binomial name
- Cyperus flavoculmis Lye

Species of sedge endemic to Kenya

Cyperus flavoculmis is a species of sedge endemic to Kenya. It is a critically endangered species known from only one location, a salt marsh in the Machakos District.

== Taxonomy and history ==
Cyperus flavoculmis was described in 1983 by botanist Kåre Arnstein Lye, based on a holotype specimen collected by Lye himself in June of 1971. The description was published in the second issue of volume three of the Nordic Journal of Botany.

== Distribution and habitat ==
Cyperus flavoculmis is known only from its type locality, a salt marsh in the Machakos District situated alongside the Nairobi–Mombasa Road at 1,650 m (5,410 ft) above sea level, where it grows at the edges of seasonal pools.

== Description ==
Cyperus flavoculmis is a robust perennial sedge growing to approximately 140 cm (55 in) tall. Arising from a 3–8 mm (0.12–0.31 in) thick upright woody rhizome, the triangular culms are 90–120 cm (35–47 in) long and 3–7 mm (0.12–0.28 in) wide. The culms are mostly smooth and yellow in colour on at least the lower half. The basal leaves, each measuring approximately 40–60 cm (16–24 in) long and 6–10 cm (2.4–3.9 in) wide, are flat and linear with a pointed tip and a roughened texture along the margins and veins. The 3–12 cm (1.2–4.7 in) long leaf sheaths are green and yellow, becoming purple towards the base, with transparent margins. The inflorescence bears five or six leaf-like involucral bracts, each measuring up to 50 cm (20 in) long and 9 mm (0.35 in) wide. The inflorescence itself is a compound anthela growing to 15–20 cm (5.9–7.9 in) long with seven to eight primary branches. The spikelets occur in loose clusters of six to thirty on straight rachia. The glumes are obovate and reddish-brown in colour with a narrow transparent margin. The flower bears three stamens and a three-branched style.

== See also ==
- List of Cyperus species
