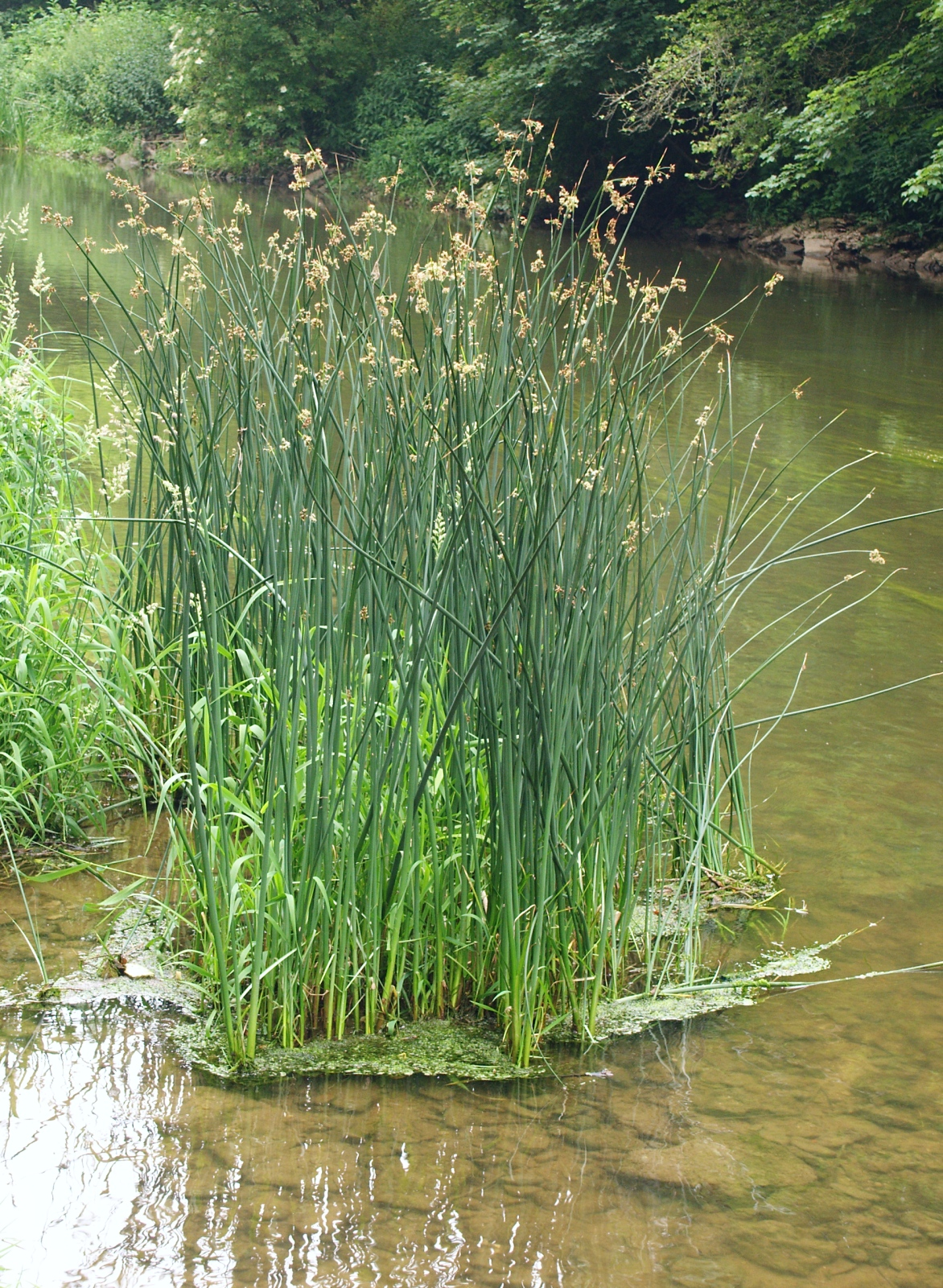

Conservation status
- Least Concern (IUCN 3.1)

Scientific classification
- Kingdom: Plantae
- Clade: Tracheophytes
- Clade: Angiosperms
- Clade: Monocots
- Clade: Commelinids
- Order: Poales
- Family: Cyperaceae
- Genus: Schoenoplectus
- Species: S. lacustris

Binomial name
- Schoenoplectus lacustris (L.) Palla

Synonyms
- Cyperus lacustris (L.) Missbach & E.H.L.Krause; Eleogiton lacustris (L.) Fourr.; Heleophylax lacustris (L.) Schinz & Thell.; Hymenochaeta lacustris (L.) Nakai; Schoenus lacustris (L.) Bernh.; Scirpus lacustris L.

= Schoenoplectus lacustris =

Species of grass-like plant

Schoenoplectus lacustris, the common club-rush, is a species of club-rush (genus Schoenoplectus) that grows in fresh water across Europe, much of Asia, and with a disjunct population in southern Africa.

== Description ==
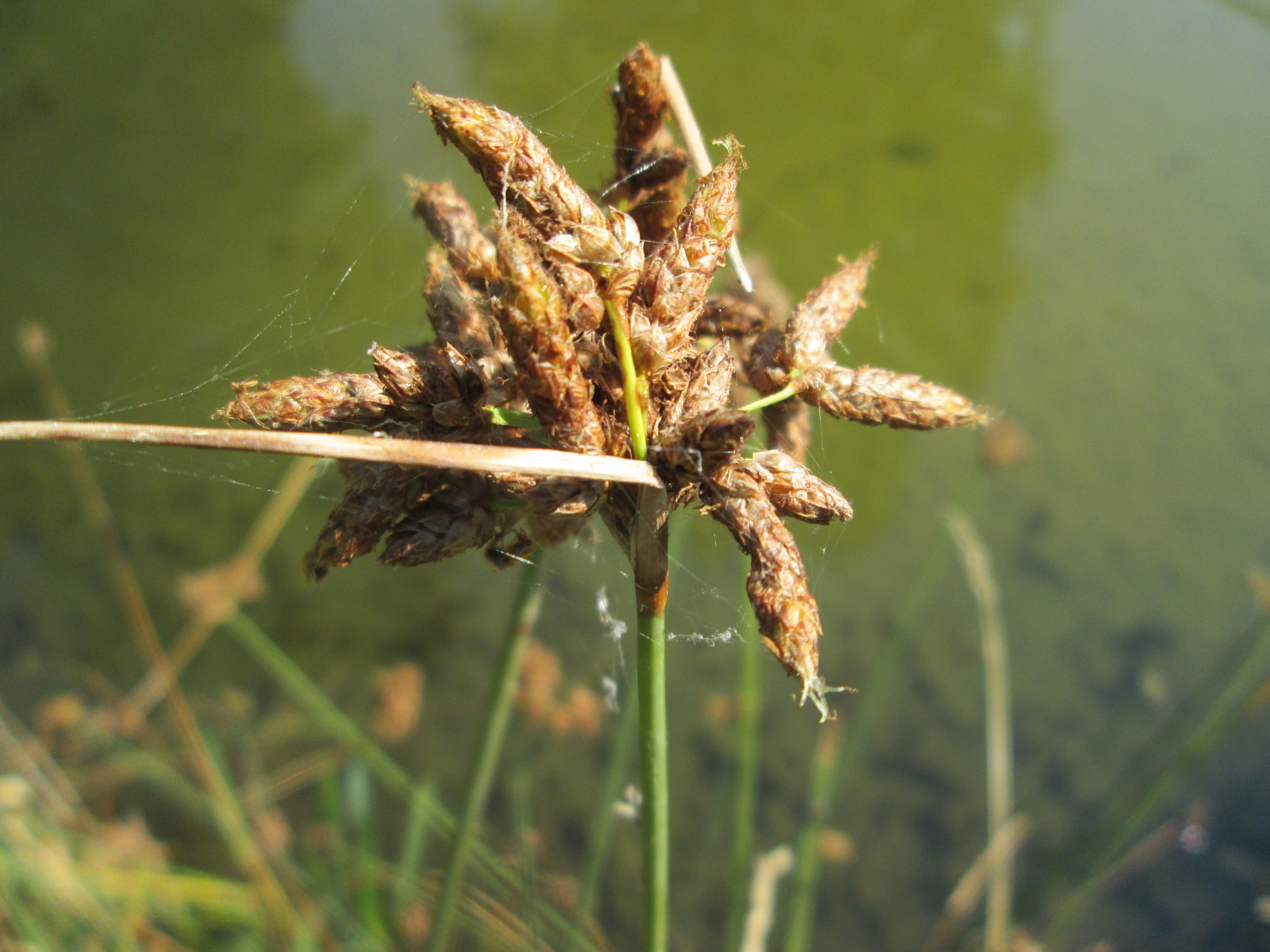
The young flowerhead can resemble a club, whence the English name of the plant

Schoenoplectus lacustris grows up to 3.5 metres (11 ft) tall, with mid to dark green (not glaucous) stems 5–15 mm (0.2–0.6 in) thick. Most of the leaves of S. lacustris are reduced to bladeless sheaths around the stem, but leaf blades up to 100 cm (40 in) long can be formed under water. The inflorescence appears at the top of the stem, and comprises 3–10 branches, each of which is up to 10 cm (4 in) long and may be again divided into shorter branches. The flowers are in the form of spikelets, each of which is 6–15 mm (0.2–0.6 in) long by 3–5 millimetres (0.1–0.2 in) wide. It typically grows in water 0.3–1.5 m deep, but can grow in water deeper than this.

The stems are round in cross-section, in contrast to the triquetrous (rounded-triangular) stems of other species in the genus, such as S. triqueter and S. pungens. The stems of S. tabernaemontani (grey club-rush) are also round, but S. tabernaemontani is a smaller plant, less than 1.5 m (5 ft) tall, with only two stigmas per flower, and has glaucous grey-green stems.

== Distribution ==
Schoenoplectus lacustris is widespread in Europe, albeit rare in the far north, and extends eastwards into Asia as far as Mongolia. It is also found in a number of Mediterranean sites in North Africa, and has been introduced to Bangladesh and Haiti.

== Taxonomy ==
The species was first described by Carl Linnaeus as Scirpus lacustris in his 1753 Species Plantarum. It became part of the genus Schoenoplectus when Eduard Palla raised this from the rank of subgenus to the rank of genus in 1888. Two subspecies are recognised; the autonymic subspecies (S. lacustris subsp. lacustris) is found throughout the range of the species, and a second, S. lacustris subsp. hippolyti is restricted to an area reaching from the Caucasus to the mountains of Central Asia. It can hybridise with S. tabernaemontani, the hybrid being known as Schoenoplectus × flevensis; this hybrid is known from Great Britain, the Netherlands, Germany, and the Baltic States.
