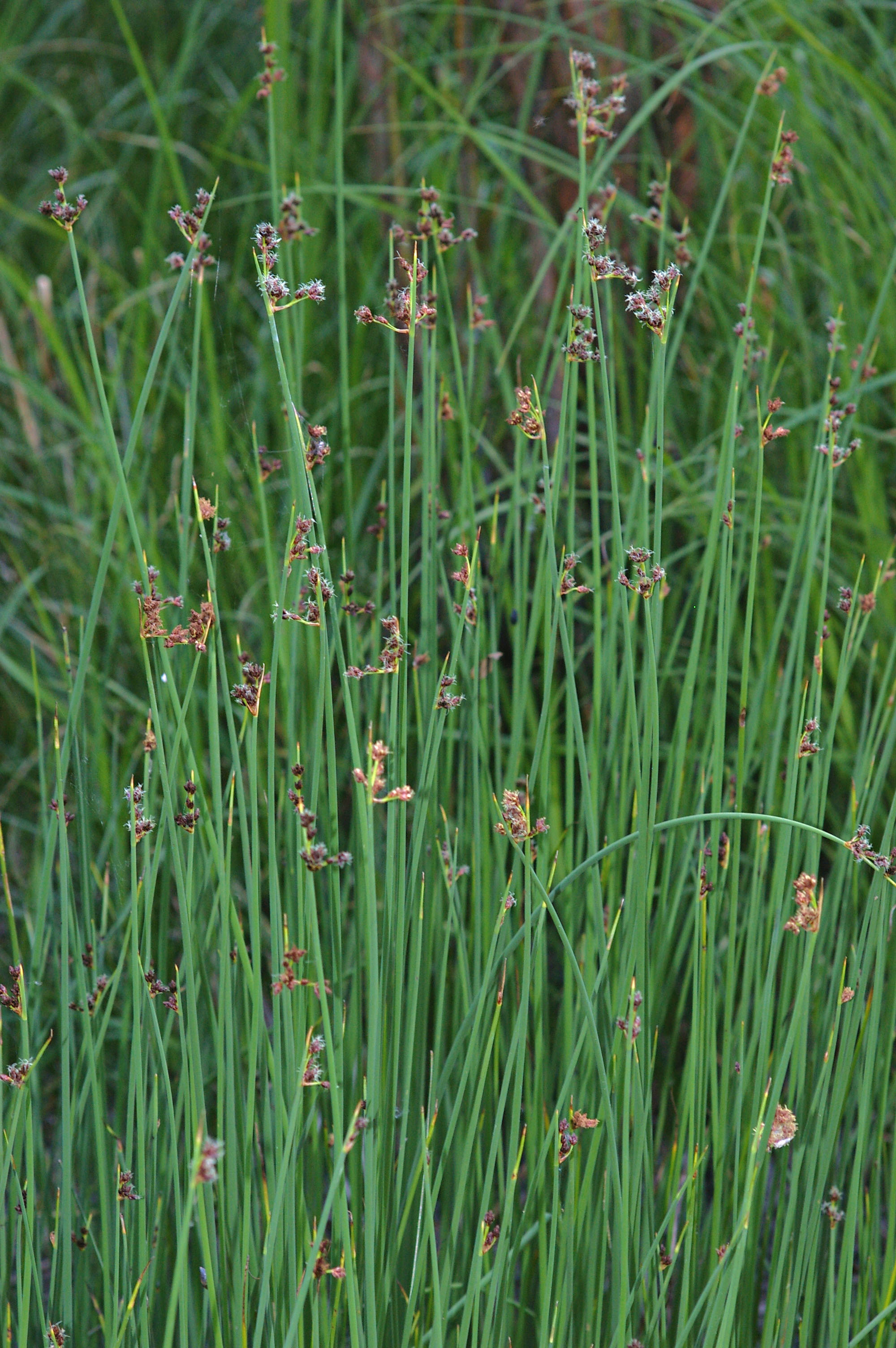
- Grey club-rush in flower in Lower Saxony, Germany

Scientific classification
- Kingdom: Plantae
- Clade: Tracheophytes
- Clade: Angiosperms
- Clade: Monocots
- Clade: Commelinids
- Order: Poales
- Family: Cyperaceae
- Genus: Schoenoplectus
- Species: S. tabernaemontani

Binomial name
- Schoenoplectus tabernaemontani (C.C.Gmel.) Palla

Synonyms
- List: Scirpus tabernaemontani C.C.Gmel. (basionym); Cyperus tabernaemontani (C.C.Gmel.) Missbach & E.H.L.Krause; Eleogiton tabernaemontani (C.C.Gmel.) Fourr.; Heleogiton tabernaemontani (C.C.Gmel.) Peterm.; Heleophylax tabernaemontani (C.C.Gmel.) Schinz & Thell.; Hymenochaeta tabernaemontani (C.C.Gmel.) Nakai; Heleogiton glaucum Rchb.; Schoenoplectus validus (Vahl) Á.Löve & D.Löve; Scirpus lacustris subsp. tabernaemontani (C.C.Gmel.) Syme; Scirpus siculus Lojac.; Scirpus uliginosus Kar. & Kir.; Scirpus validus Vahl; Scirpus welwitschii K.Richt.

= Schoenoplectus tabernaemontani =

Species of grass-like plant

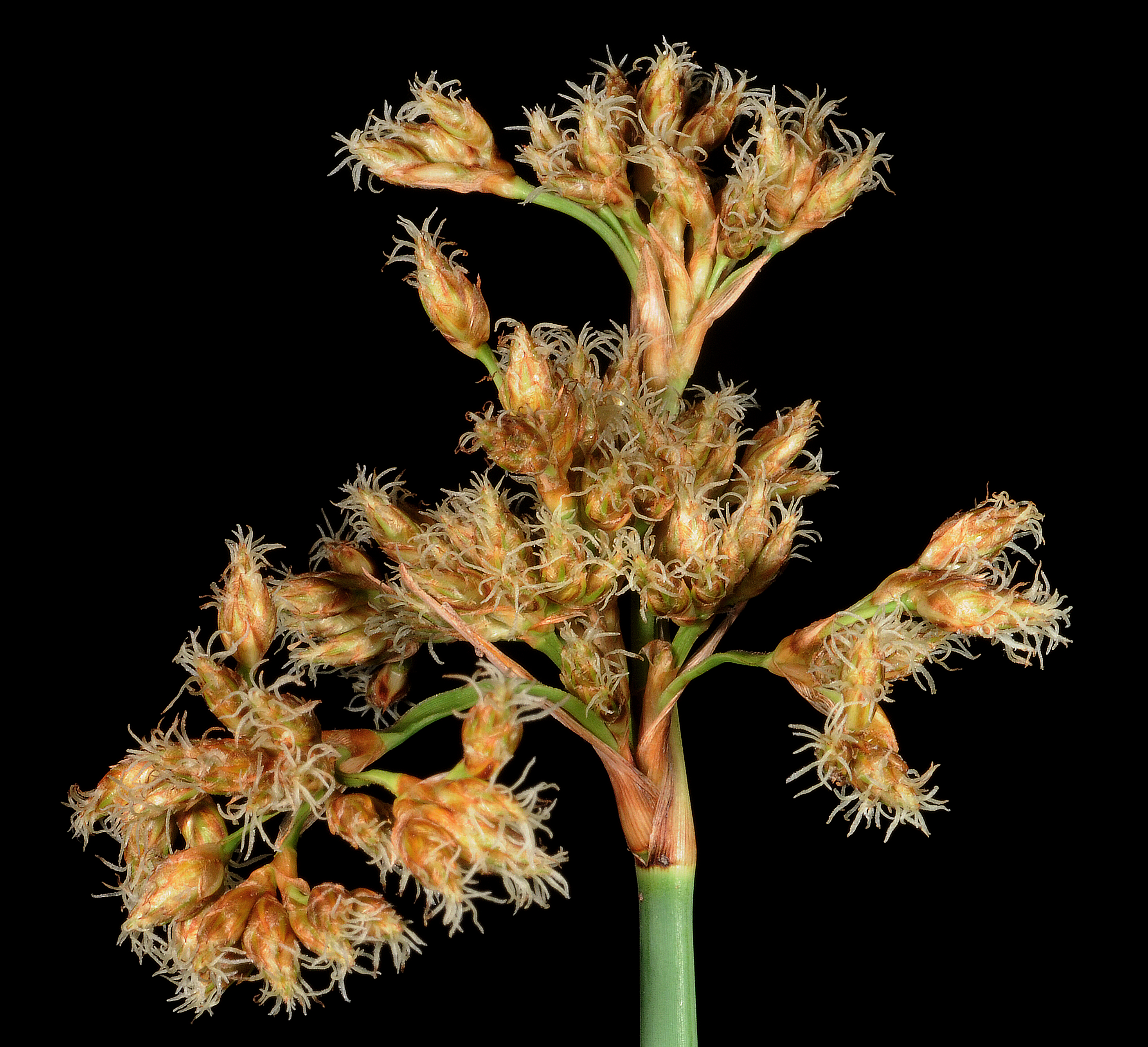
Schoenoplectus tabernaemontani

Schoenoplectus tabernaemontani is a species of flowering plant in the sedge family known by the common names grey club-rush, softstem bulrush, and great bulrush.

== Distribution ==
It has a cosmopolitan distribution, occurring in every country in Europe except for Iceland, all of temperate Asia except for Mongolia, every state in the United States (including Hawaii), every province and territory in Canada except Nunavut, and in most of Australasia; only in Africa and South America is it less widespread, though still present in several countries in each. It grows in wet habitats, usually in shallow water; it is most abundant in brackish and tidal estuarine water, but also occurs widely in fresh water.

== Description ==
Schoenoplectus tabernaemontani is quite variable in appearance, thus explaining the long list of synonyms that have been created over the years. It is a perennial herb producing dense stands of many narrow erect stems reaching 1–1.5 m (3–5 ft), rarely to 3 m (10 ft), in height. It grows from a long rhizome system. The leaves are mostly basal, usually underwater, and have wide sheaths around the stems. The inflorescence is a panicle of spikelets on thin stems 2–6 cm long which spread, arch, or droop. The spikelets variably brown. There is usually a long, stiff bract alongside each spikelet or cluster of spikelets. Flowering is in early to mid summer (June to July in Britain), and fruiting in late summer to early autumn (August to September in Britain).

It is closely related to Schoenoplectus lacustris (common club-rush), being distinguished from it by its smaller size (up to 1.5 m, as opposed to 3 m), slenderer, glaucous stems, and in the flowers having just two, rather than three, stigmas. Both share stems circular in cross-section, unlike the triangular stems of Schoenoplectus triqueter (triangular club-rush).

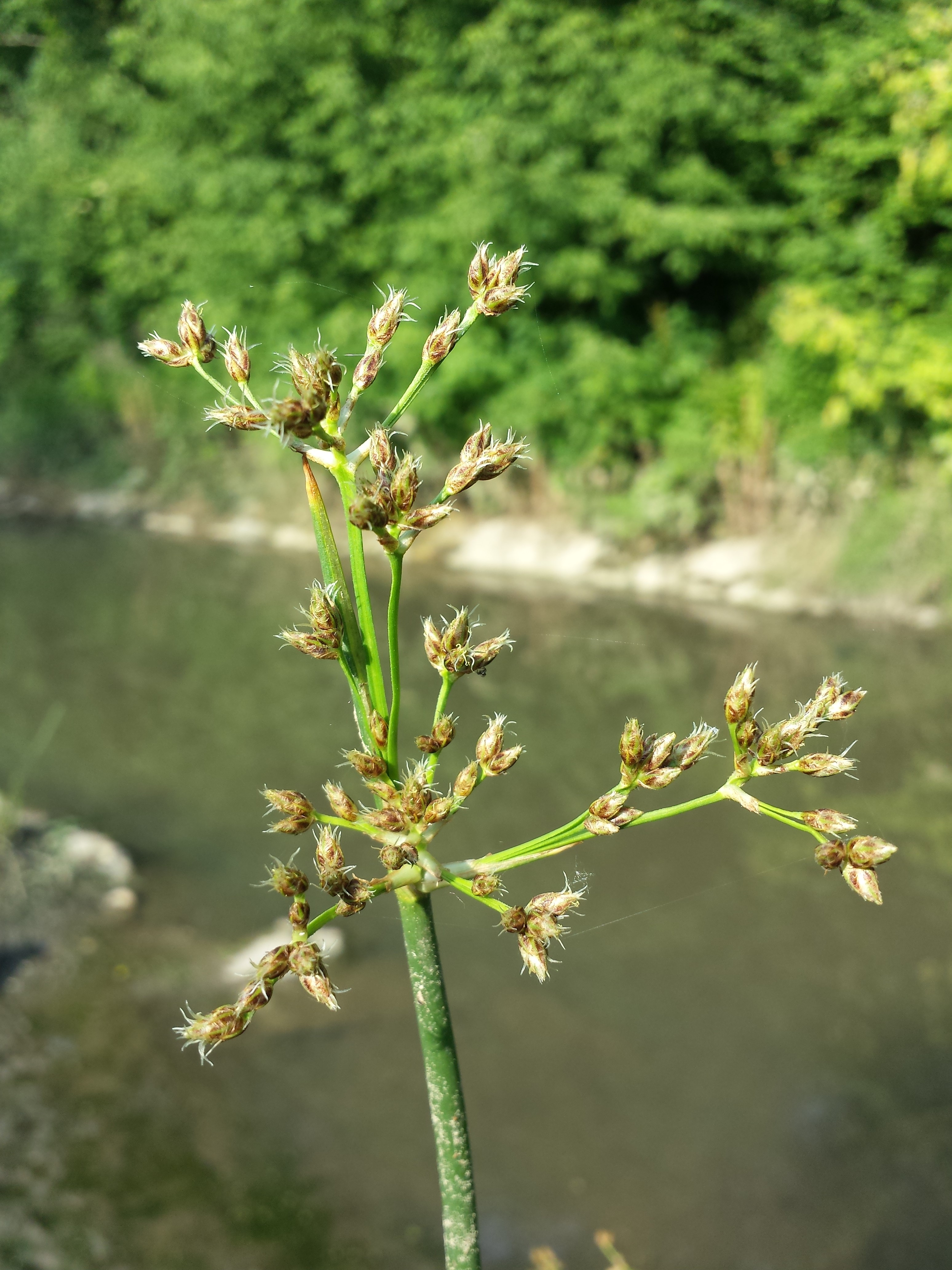
Inflorescence. Vienna, Austria.

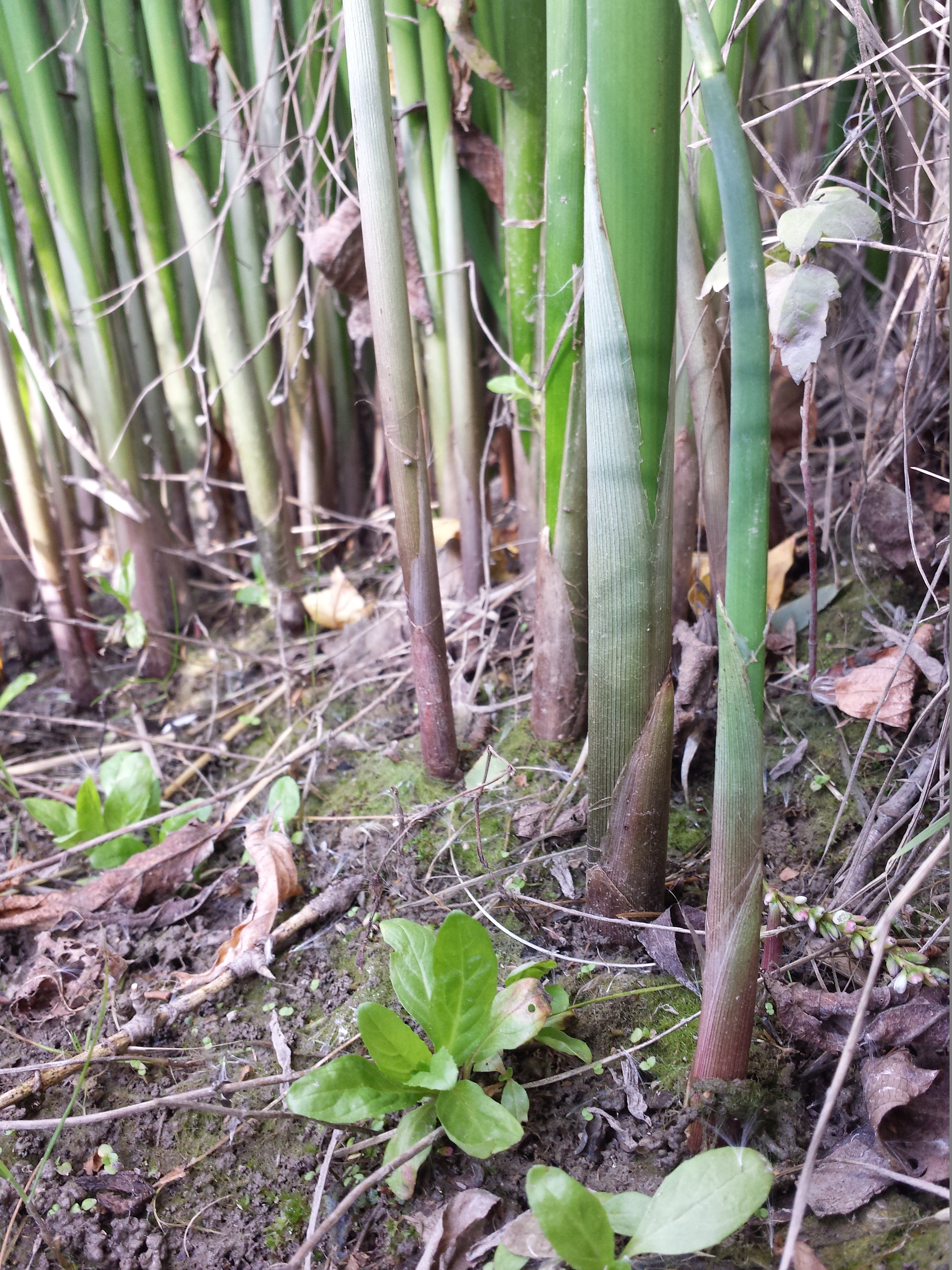
Stem bases showing the sheath-like leaves; usually underwater but exposed here by drought. Vienna, Austria.

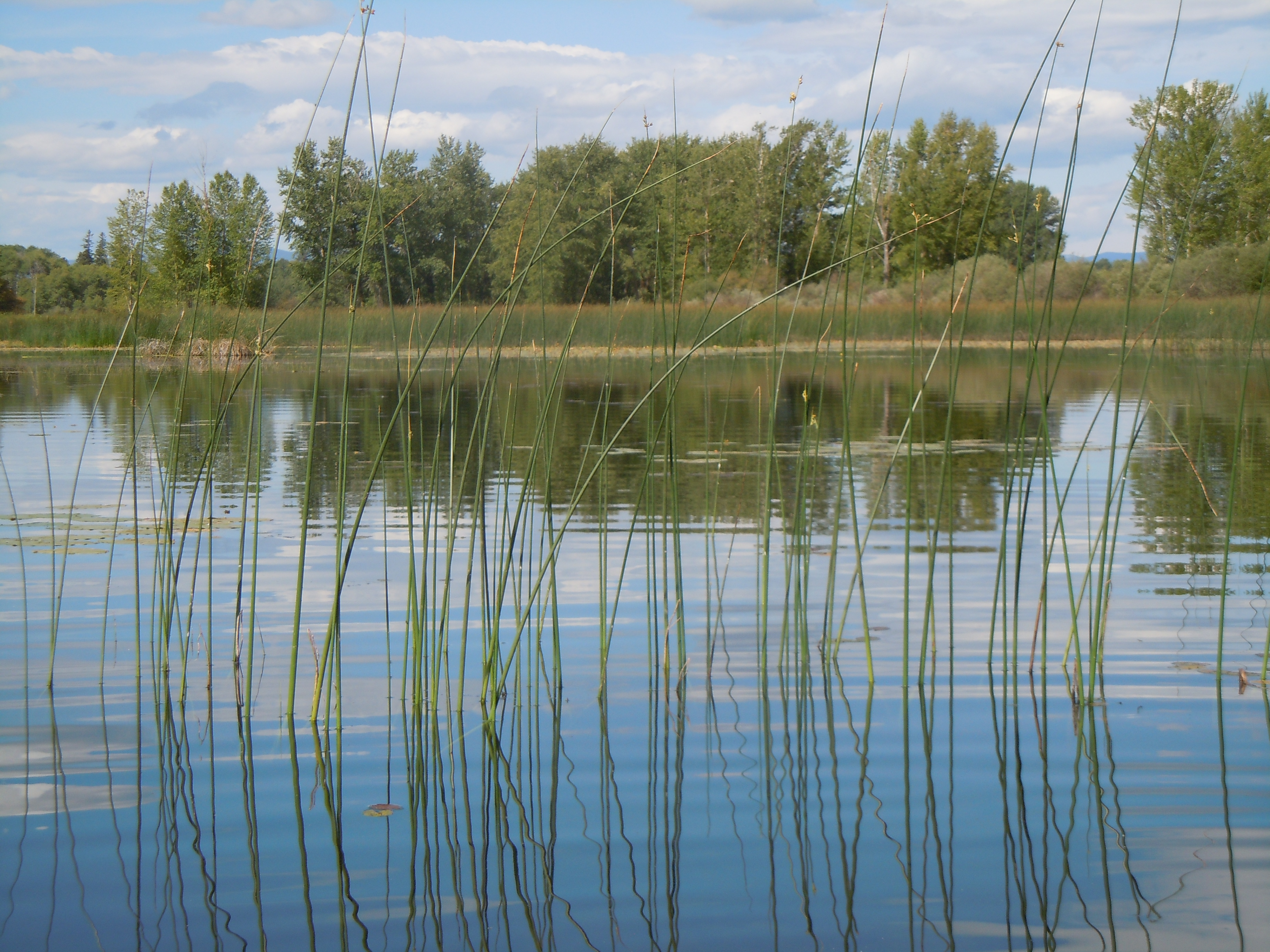
Typical habitat in water. Montana, USA.

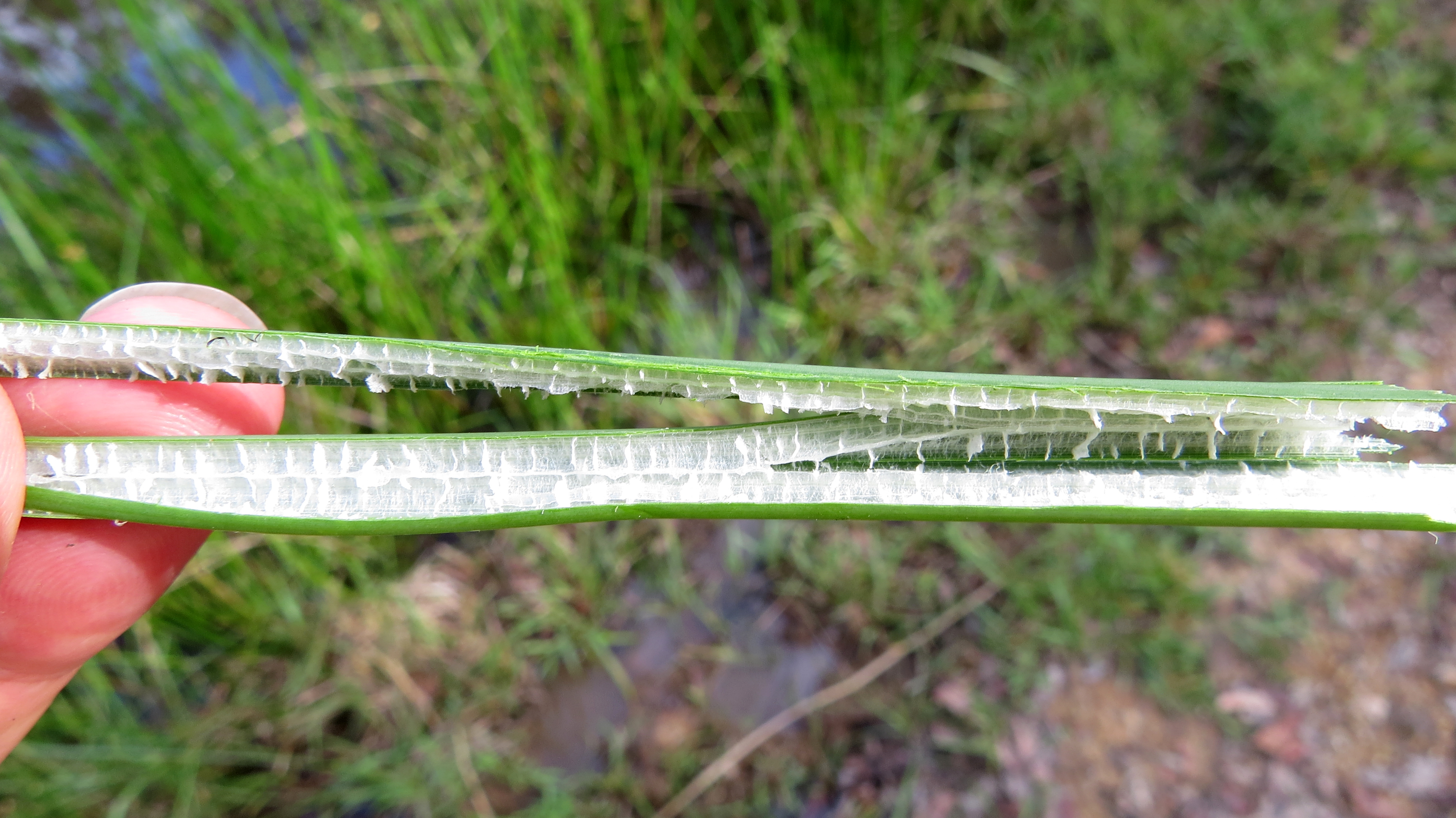
The stem is filled with chambered pith. New South Wales, Australia.

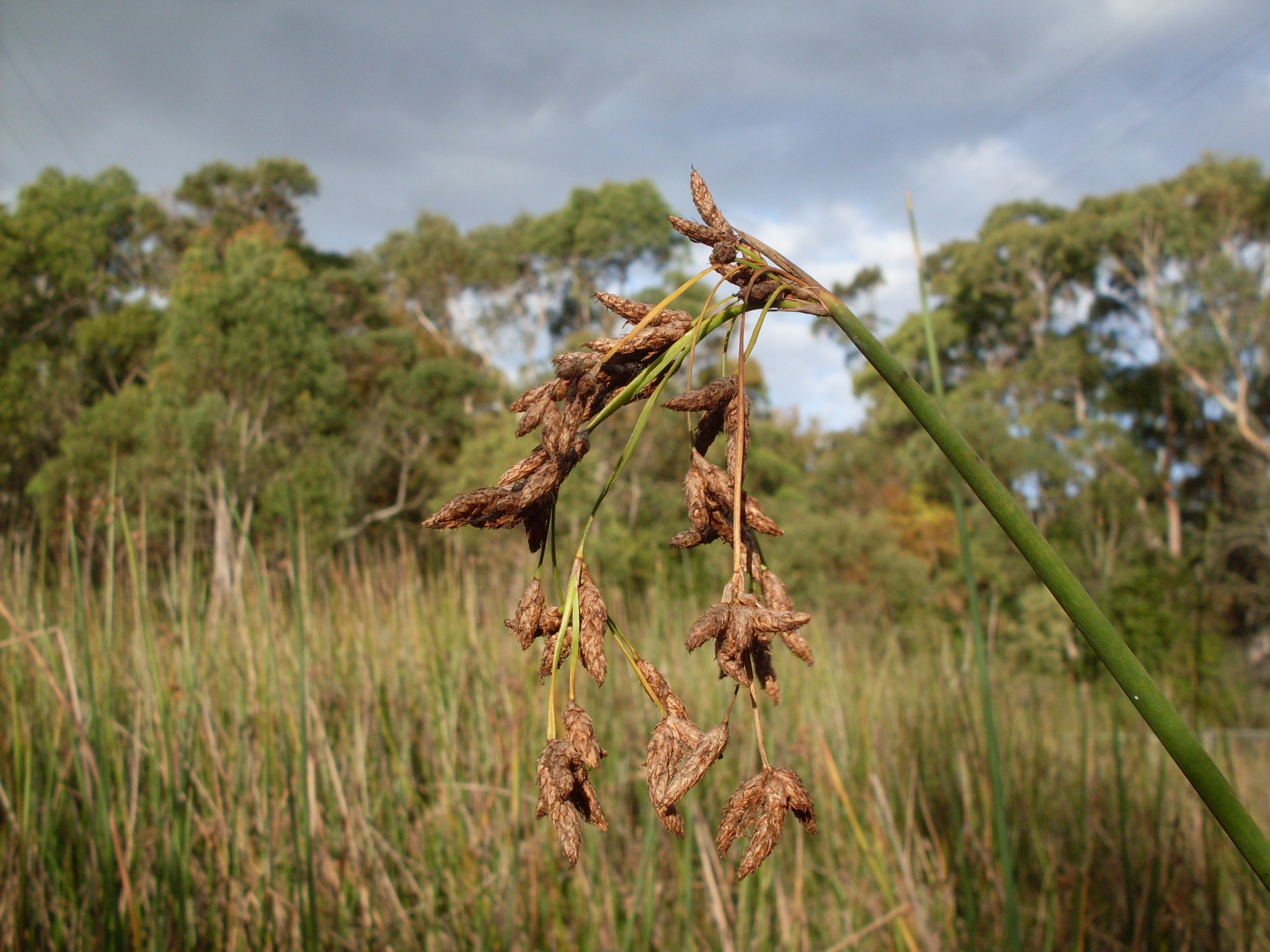
Mature seedheads. New South Wales, Australia.

== Uses ==
The new shoots and young roots may be eaten raw or cooked. The older roots can be made into flour.

In Hawaii, where it is known as ‘aka‘akai, kaluhā, or nānaku, its stems are made into floor mats. In New Zealand, known as kāpūngāwhā, it is a source of weaving fabric.

A cultivar with bright horizontal white or yellowish stripes, S. tabernaemontani 'Zebrinus', is sold as an ornamental plant for water gardens and landscaping. Solid white and yellow cultivars are also available.
