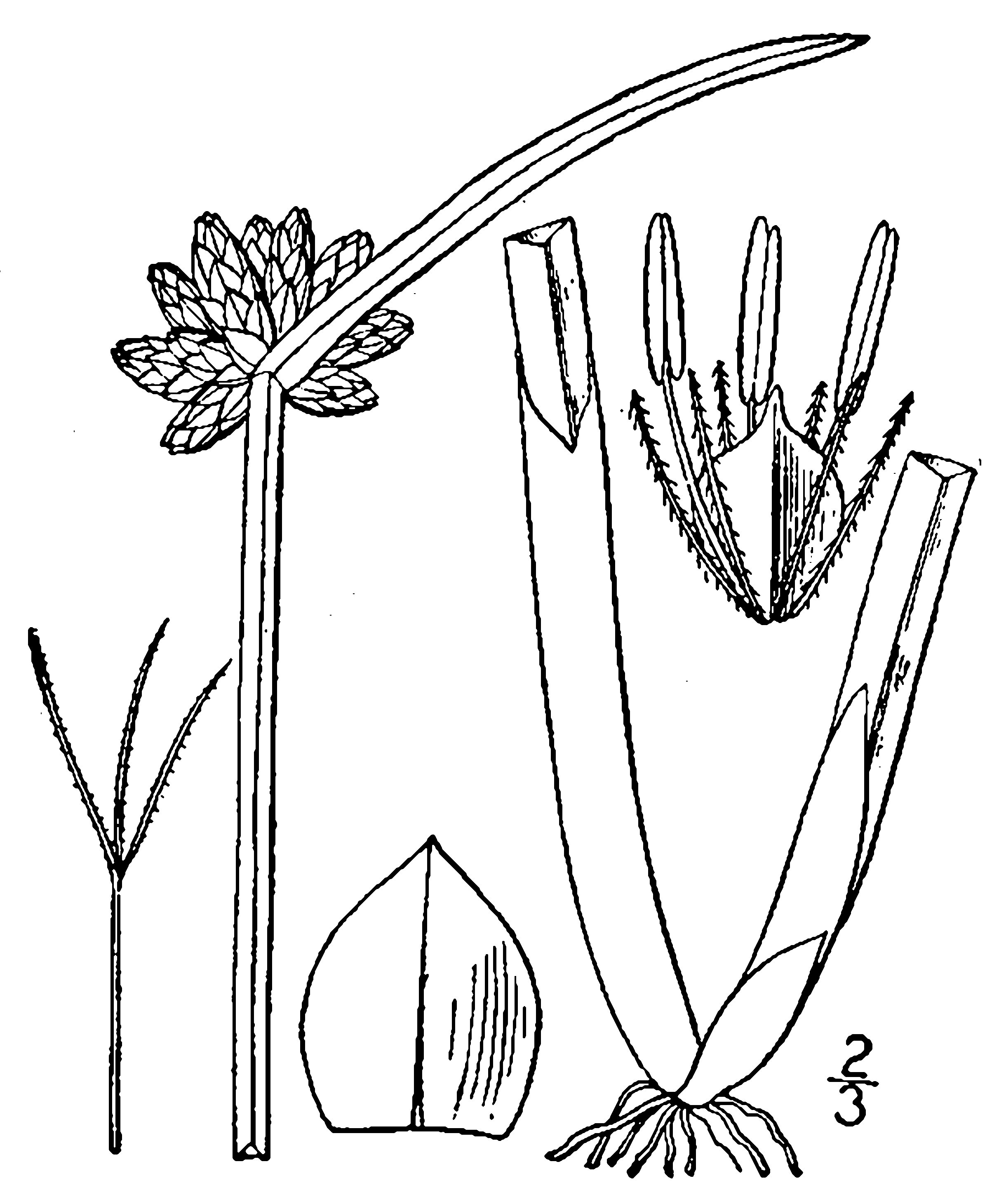

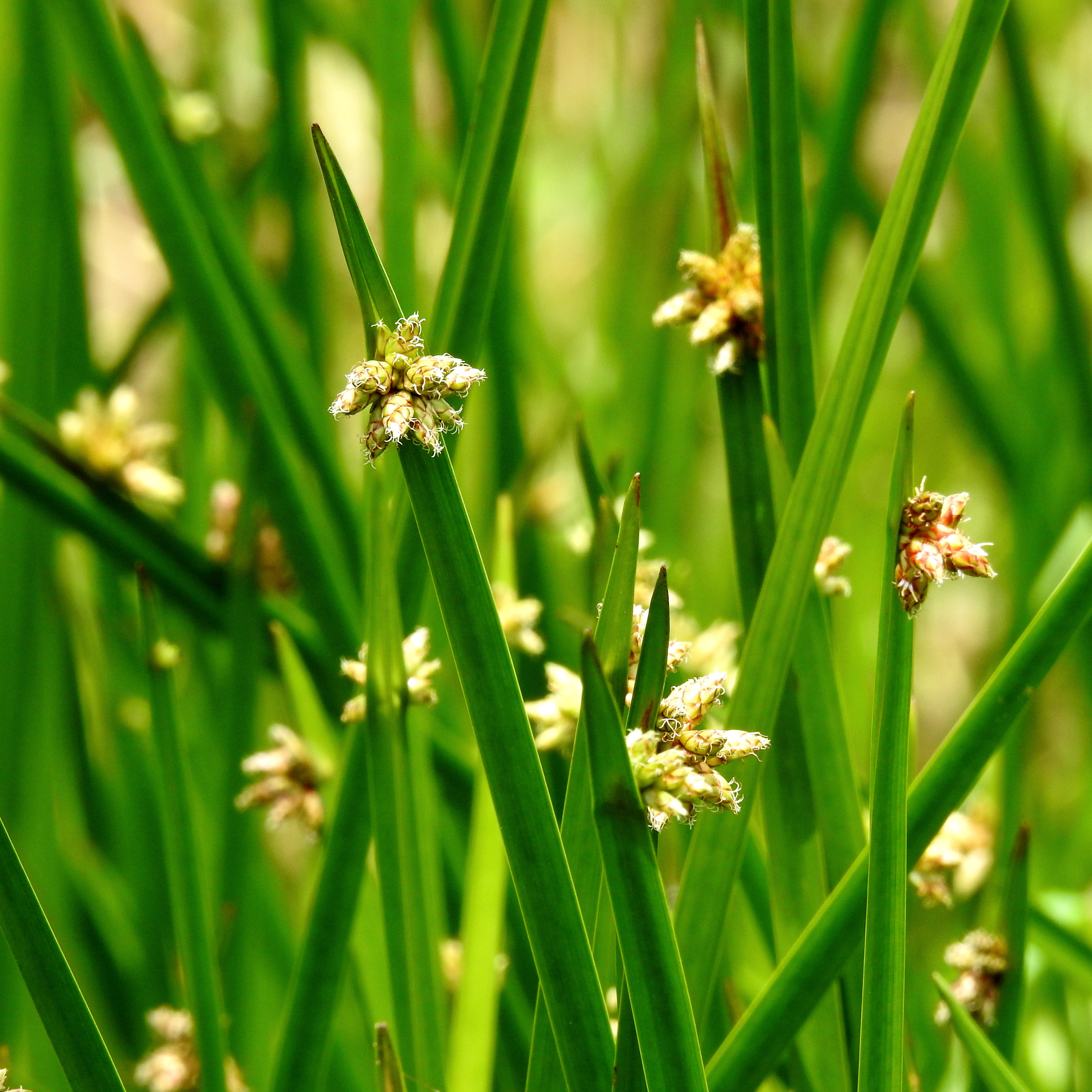
- Walini, Schoenoplectiella mucronata from Puncak, Bogor Regency, West Java

Scientific classification
- Kingdom: Plantae
- Clade: Tracheophytes
- Clade: Angiosperms
- Clade: Monocots
- Clade: Commelinids
- Order: Poales
- Family: Cyperaceae
- Genus: Schoenoplectiella
- Species: S. mucronata

Binomial name
- Schoenoplectiella mucronata (L.) J.Jung & H.K.Choi

Synonyms
- Scirpus mucronatus L.; Schoenoplectus mucronatus (L.) Palla ex A.Kern.

= Schoenoplectiella mucronata =

Species of grass-like plant

Schoenoplectiella mucronata is a species of flowering plant in the sedge family known by the common names bog bulrush, rough-seed bulrush, and ricefield bulrush.

== Distribution ==
It is native to Eurasia, Africa and Australia.

== Habitat and description ==
It grows in moist and wet terrestrial habitat, and in shallow water. It is a perennial herb growing from a short, hard rhizome. The erect, three-angled stems grow in dense clumps and can reach a metre tall. The leaves take the form of sheaths wrapped around the base of stem, but they generally do not have blades. The inflorescence is a headlike cluster of cone-shaped spikelets accompanied by an angled, stiff bract which may look like a continuation of the stem.

It is a weed of rice fields in California.

== Taxonomy ==
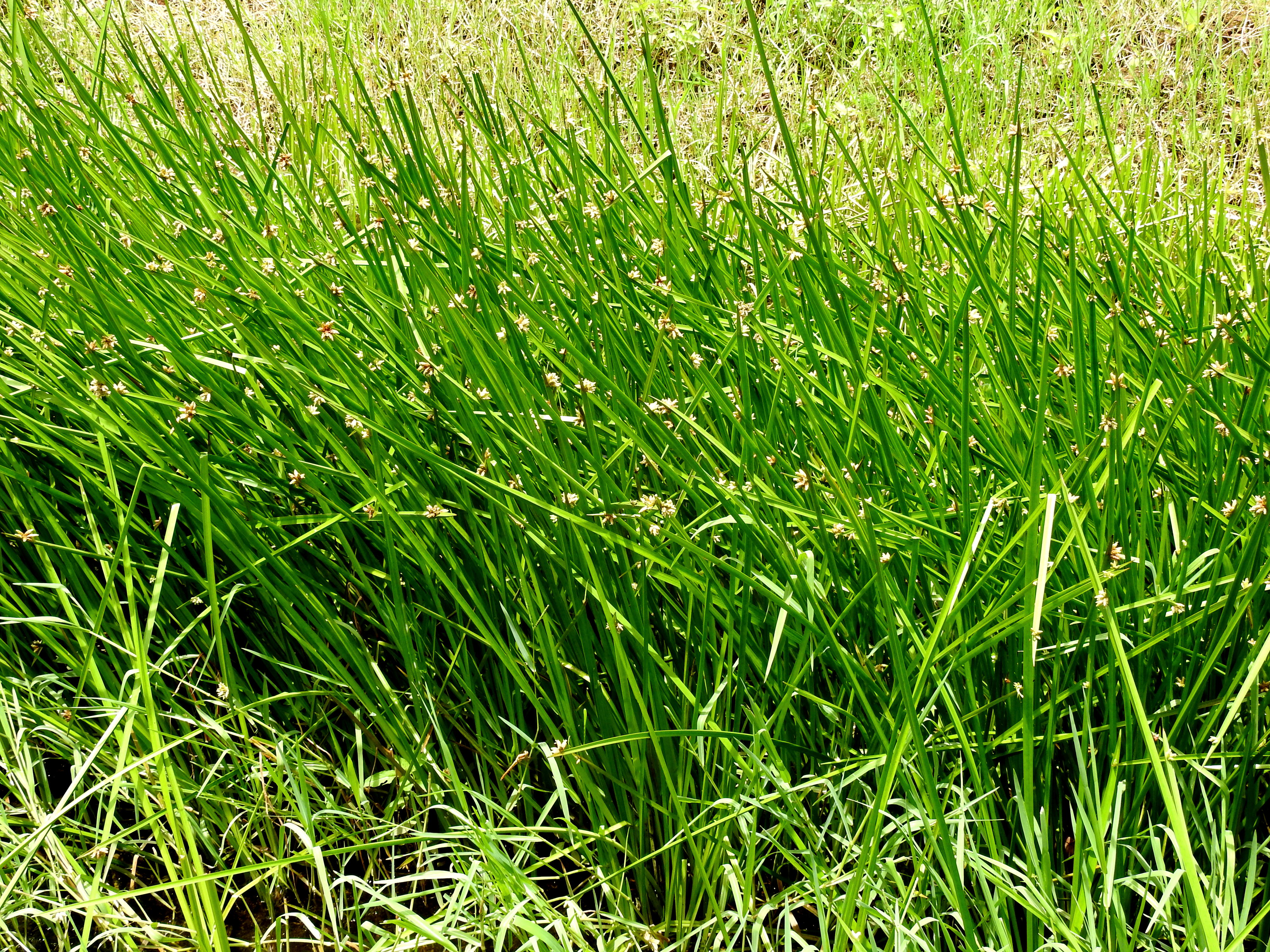
Forming a dense thickets along ditches

As of July 2020, Plants of the World Online lists 35 taxonomic synonyms of Schoenoplectiella mucronata, and the Council of Heads of Australasian Herbaria lists two. It was first described as Scirpus mucronatus in 1753 by Carl Linnaeus. In 1889 Eduard Palla transferred it to the genus, Schoenoplectus, and Schoenoplectus mucronatus was the accepted name until 2010 when it was transferred to the genus, Schoenoplectiella by Jongduk Jung and Hong-Kuen Choi.
