= Anton Hartinger =

Austrian artist (1806–1890)

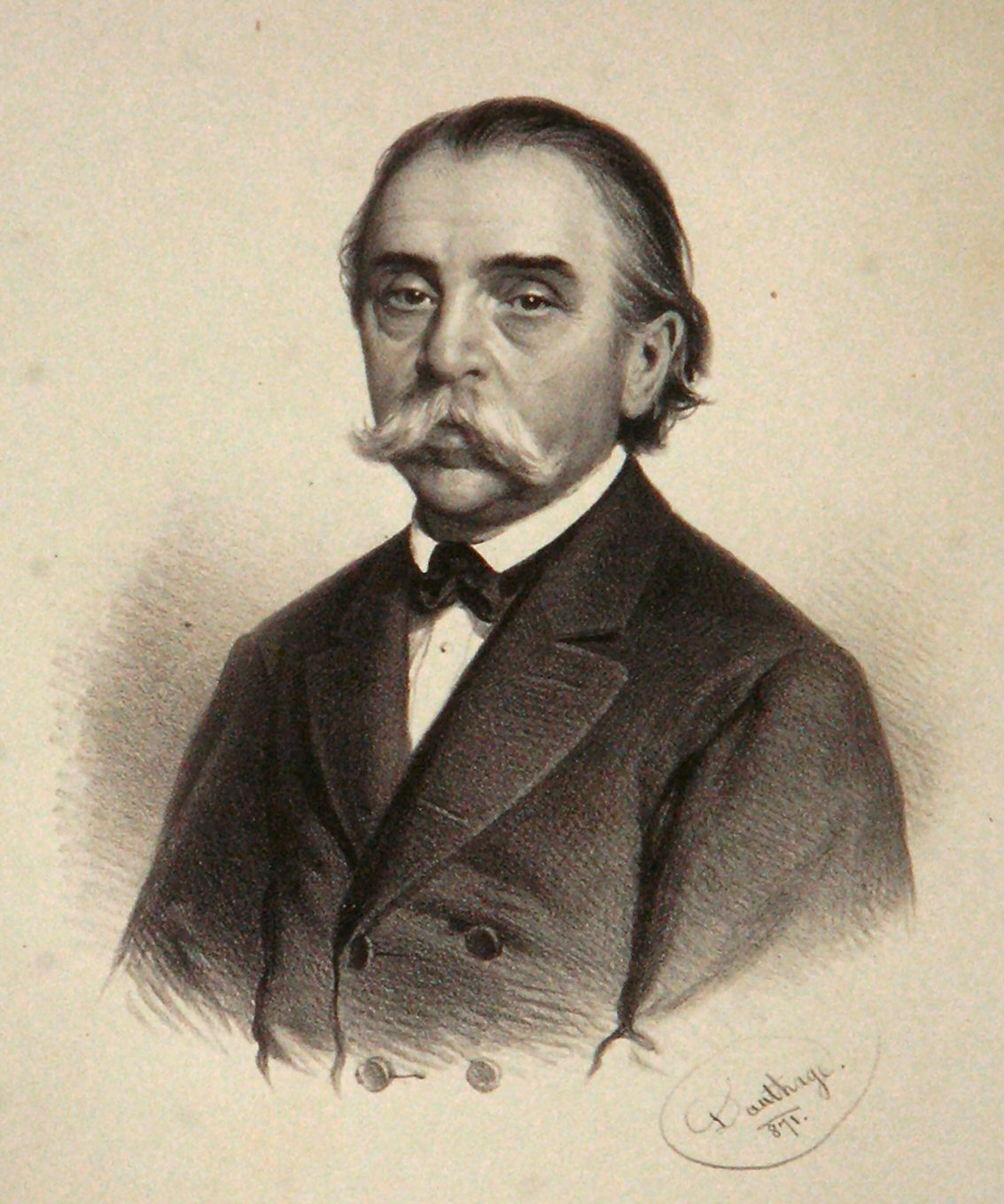
Anton Hartinger; lithograph by Adolf Dauthage (1871)

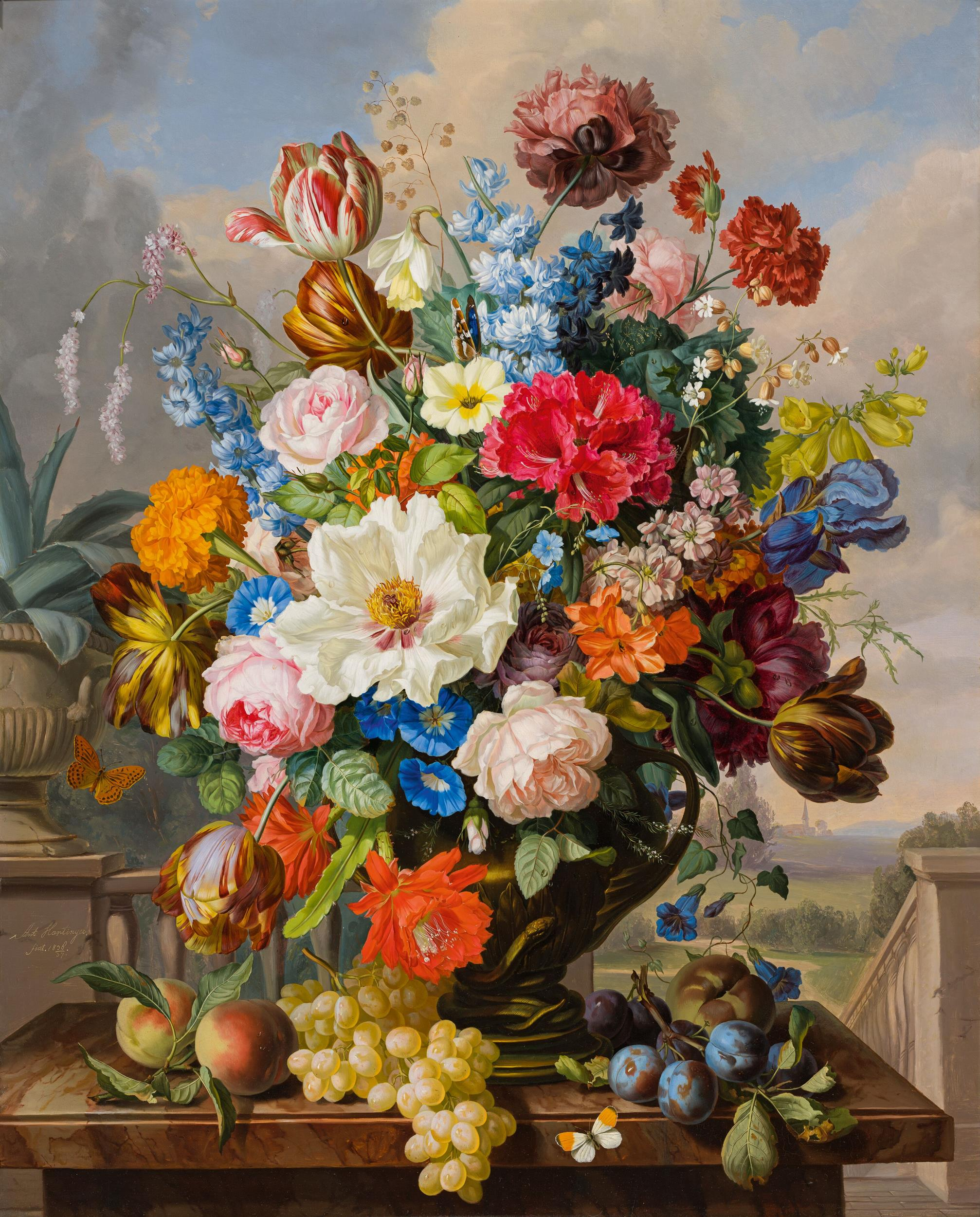
ANTON HARTINGER Flowers with fruits - main work 1836

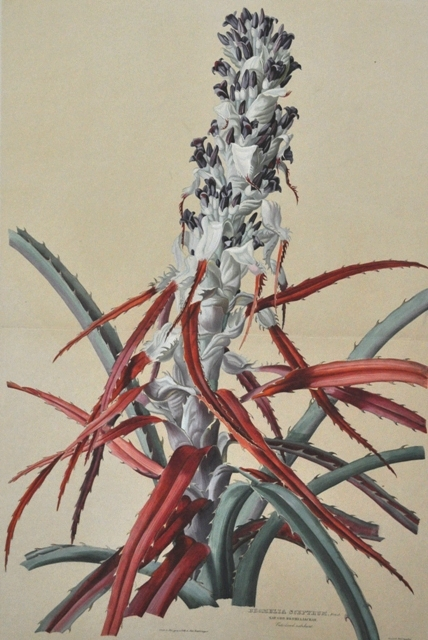
Bromelia sceptrum, from Paradisus Vindobonensis

Anton Hartinger (13 June 1806 – 24 January 1890) was an Austrian artist who specialized in still life paintings of fruit and flowers.

Hartinger was born in Vienna. He was a member of the Academy of Fine Arts Vienna from 1843 to 1851 and a pioneer in the field of chromolithography. In his still lifes he often combined traditional with more exotic flowers, reflecting the great upsurge in plant collecting, cultivation and botanical illustration taking place within the artist's lifetime. He died in Vienna.

== Botanical illustration ==
=== Endlicher's Paradisus Vindobonensis ===
This book contains Hartinger's hand painted prints of rare and ornamental plants. Investors had to be sought to obtain the funds necessary to produce and publish this work. The 20 installments took from 1844 to 1860 to publish. Very few complete copies are known to exist, however the Vienna Library and the British Library have complete sets of this book.
