= Eduard Palla =

Austrian botanist and mycologist (1864–1922)

- Born: 3 September 1864; Kroměříž, Austrian Empire (now the Czech Republic)
- Died: 7 March 1922 (aged 57); Graz, Austria
- Occupation: Austrian botanist

Eduard Palla (3 September 1864 – 7 March 1922) was an Austrian botanist and mycologist of Moravian descent. As a botanist he specialized in research of Cyperaceae (sedges), of which he was the taxonomic authority of many species.

From 1883 to 1887 he studied natural sciences at the University of Vienna, receiving his doctorate with a dissertation on the anatomy and systematics of Cyperaceae. Following graduation he worked as an assistant to Gottlieb Haberlandt at the University of Graz, where in 1891 he obtained his habilitation in botany. In 1900–01 he conducted investigations of sedges and tropical fungi on Java and Sumatra of the Dutch East Indies. In 1909 he became an associate professor at Graz, followed by a full professorship in 1913.

== Selected works ==
- Atlas der Alpenflora (with Karl Wilhelm von Dalla Torre and Anton Hartinger), II, new edition, 1897 – Atlas of Alpine flora.
- Ueber die gattung Phyllactinia, 1899 – On the genus Phyllactinia.
- Zur kenntniss der Pilobolus-arten, 1900 - On research of Pilobolus.
- Die Gattungen der mitteleuropäischen Scirpoideen, 1900 – The genera of mid-European Scirpoideae.
- Cyperaceae 1906.
- Neue Cyperaceen, 1909 – New Cyperaceae.
