= Tetsuo Michael Koyama =

Japanese botanist (born 1933)

Tetsuo Michael Koyama (1933 – 2024) was a Japanese botanist and collector. Throughout his career, he was active in Japan, Brazil, Venezuela, Argentina and the United States.

This botanist is denoted by the author abbreviation T.Koyama when citing a botanical name.
