= Kåre Arnstein Lye =

Norwegian botanist (1940–2021)

Kåre Arnstein Lye (9 March 1940 – 24 March 2021) was a Norwegian botanist and field biologist.

This botanist is denoted by the author abbreviation Lye when citing a botanical name.

Lye was born in Bryne in south western Norway and studied at the University of Oslo. In 1968 he was employed as a scientific assistant at the former Agricultural University of Norway in the Department of Botany. In 1973 he was appointed to the Norwegian College of Agriculture (later the Norwegian University of Life Sciences) and became a professor in 1994 and remained there until his retirement in 2010.

He was regarded as an authority on sedges and revised flora releases in tropical countries, often in Africa. Most of his published works were for the families Cyperaceae, Rosaceae, Asteraceae, Juncaceae and Poaceae.
