= List of Isolepis species =

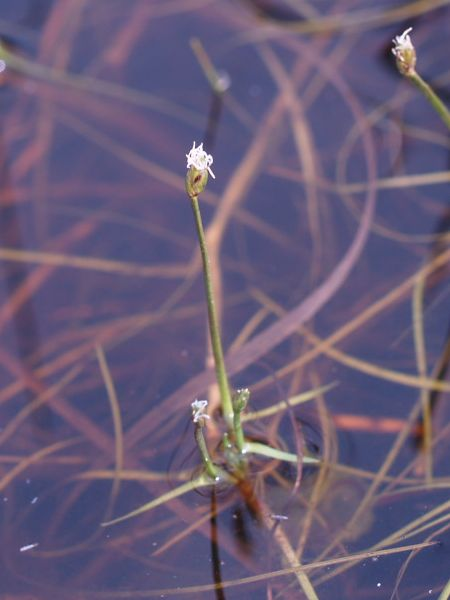
Isolepis fluitans

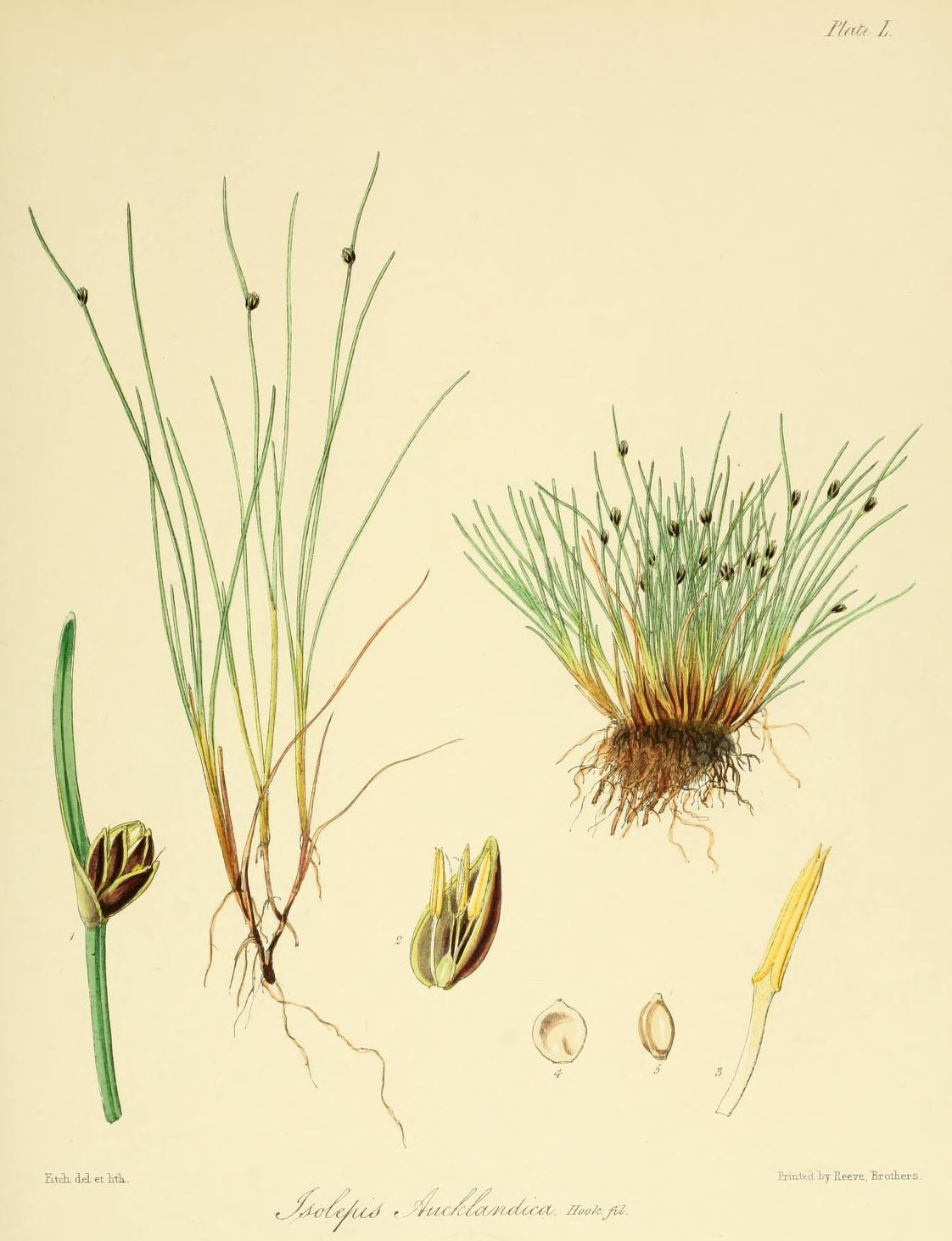
Isolepis aucklandica

List of Isolepis species — a cosmopolitan genus of flowering plants in the sedge family, Cyperaceae.

== Species ==
According to Plants of the World Online the genus Isolepis contains 70 recognized species, they include:

- Isolepis alpina Hook.f.
- Isolepis angelica B.L.Burtt
- Isolepis antarctica (L.) Roem. & Schult.
- Isolepis aucklandica Hook.f.
- Isolepis australiensis (Maiden & Betche) K.L.Wilson
- Isolepis basilaris Hook.f.
- Isolepis beccarii (Boeckeler) Goetgh. & D.A.Simpson
- Isolepis bicolor Carmich.
- Isolepis brevicaulis (Levyns) J.Raynal
- Isolepis bulbifera (Boeckeler) Muasya
- Isolepis caligenis (V.J.Cook) Soják
- Isolepis carinata Hook. & Arn. ex Torr.
- Isolepis cernua (Vahl) Roem. & Schult.
- Isolepis congrua Nees
- Isolepis costata Hochst. ex A.Rich.
- Isolepis crassiuscula Hook.f.
- Isolepis cyperoides R.Br.
- Isolepis diabolica (Steud.) Schrad.
- Isolepis digitata Nees ex Schrad.
- Isolepis distigmatosa (C.B.Clarke) Edgar
- Isolepis expallescens Kunth
- Isolepis fluitans (L.) R.Br.
- Isolepis gaudichaudiana Kunth
- Isolepis graminoides (R.W.Haines & Lye) Lye
- Isolepis habra (Edgar) Soják
- Isolepis humbertii (Cherm.) J.Raynal
- Isolepis hystrix (Thunb.) Nees
- Isolepis inconspicua (Levyns) J.Raynal
- Isolepis inundata R.Br.
- Isolepis karroica (C.B.Clarke) J.Raynal
- Isolepis keniaensis Lye
- Isolepis kilimanjarica R.W.Haines & Lye
- Isolepis leptostachya Kunth
- Isolepis levynsiana Muasya & D.A.Simpson
- Isolepis limbata W.M.Curtis
- Isolepis ludwigii (Steud.) Kunth
- Isolepis marginata (Thunb.) A.Dietr.
- Isolepis montivaga (S.T.Blake) K.L.Wilson
- Isolepis moseleyana (Boeckeler) Muasya
- Isolepis multicaulis Schltdl.
- Isolepis namaquana Muasya & J.Viljoen
- Isolepis natans (Thunb.) A.Dietr.
- Isolepis nigricans Kunth
- Isolepis oldfieldiana (S.T.Blake) K.L.Wilson
- Isolepis omissa J.Raynal
- Isolepis pellocolea B.L.Burtt
- Isolepis pottsii (V.J.Cook) Soják
- Isolepis praetextata (Edgar) Soják
- Isolepis producta (C.B.Clarke) K.L.Wilson
- Isolepis prolifera (Rottb.) R.Br.
- Isolepis pseudosetacea (Daveau) Gand.
- Isolepis pusilla Kunth
- Isolepis ranko (Steud.) Vegetti
- Isolepis reticularis Colenso
- Isolepis rubicunda Kunth
- Isolepis ruwenzoriensis R.W.Haines & Lye
- Isolepis sepulcralis Steud.
- Isolepis setacea (L.) R.Br.
- Isolepis sororia Kunth
- Isolepis stellata (C.B.Clarke) K.L.Wilson
- Isolepis striata (Nees) Kunth
- Isolepis subtilissima Boeckeler
- Isolepis sulcata (Thouars) Carmich.
- Isolepis tasmanica (S.T.Blake) K.L.Wilson
- Isolepis tenuissima (Nees) Kunth
- Isolepis trachysperma Nees
- Isolepis varians Steud.
- Isolepis venustula Kunth
- Isolepis victoriensis (N.A.Wakef.) K.L.Wilson
- Isolepis wakefieldiana (S.T.Blake) K.L.Wilson
