= French Creek =

French Creek may refer to:

== Communities ==
=== Canada ===
- French Creek, Alberta
- French Creek (British Columbia)

=== United States ===
- French Creek, former name of Frenchtown, El Dorado County, California
- French Creek Township, Allamakee County, Iowa
- French Creek, New York
- French Creek Township, Pennsylvania (disambiguation)
- French Creek, West Virginia
- Upper French Creek, Wisconsin

== Bodies of water ==
=== United States ===
- French Creek (Upper Iowa River tributary), Iowa
- French Creek (Lake Itasca), Clearwater County, Minnesota
- Frenchs Creek, North Carolina
- French Creek (Black River), a stream in Lorain County, Ohio
- French Creek (Allegheny River tributary), Pennsylvania & New York
- French Creek (Schuylkill River tributary), Pennsylvania
- French Creek (Cheyenne River), South Dakota
- French Creek (Snohomish River), a stream in Washington
- French Creek (Buckhannon River), West Virginia

=== Worldwide ===
- French Creek (British Columbia), British Columbia, Canada
- French Creek (Malta), one of several inlets opening off Grand Harbour, Malta

== Other ==
- French Creek Council, Boy Scout council in Ohio and Pennsylvania
- French Creek Farm, in Pennsylvania
- French Creek Presbyterian Church, in West Virginia
- French Creek State Park, in Pennsylvania
- French Creek Wildlife Area, in Wisconsin
- West Virginia State Wildlife Center, previously known as French Creek Game Farm, in West Virginia

== See also ==
- French Pete Creek, a tributary of the South Fork McKenzie River in Lane County, Oregon
- Frenchman Creek (disambiguation)
