= Isolepis platycarpa =

Scientific classification
- Kingdom: Plantae
- Clade: Tracheophytes
- Clade: Angiosperms
- Clade: Monocots
- Clade: Commelinids
- Order: Poales
- Family: Cyperaceae
- Genus: Isolepis
- Species: I. platycarpa

Binomial name
- Isolepis platycarpa Jiří Soják (1980)

Species of grass-like plant

Isolepis platycarpa is a small, tufted sedge species endemic to native to Australia. It belongs to the Cyperaceae family and is most commonly found coastally in Victoria and Tasmania. This rare plant is most commonly referred to as the flat-fruit club-rush.

== Description ==
Isolepis platycarpa is a short, tufted plant reaching 20 cm (7.9 in) in height. It’s semi-erect stems are long and thread-like, showing a green colour arising from a brown base. Its leaves are very small (1.5 cm (0.59 in)) and have a blade shape.

Its flowering months are in Australian summer (September to March) in which it produces spikelets as well as nuts as its fruit. 1-2 spikelets about 2–5 mm (0.079–0.197 in) long occur at the ends of the inflorescent stems, protruding from the stem at about a 45° angle. The spikelet itself has an off-white colour with a reddish tinge. Beneath the spikelets, lower bracts are spirally arranged. These bracts appear brown and have a rounded tips. The nuts are small (0.5–0.8 mm (0.020–0.031 in)) and rounded with a distinct obovate shape, appearing either dark brown or black. These nuts are commonly dispersed by animals or abiotic mechanisms such as rain and high winds. I. platycarpa can be distinguished from its relative Isolepis cernua by its nuts. The nuts of I. cernua are smaller, rounder in shape, darker in colour, and with more visible and extensive veins.

== Habitat and distribution ==
Isolepis platycarpa occurs in much of the coastal regions of southeast Australia and ventures quite far inland. It is particularly abundant in Victoria but spreads across borders into New South Wales and South Australia. It is also commonly found in Tasmania, predominantly in the east and south-east, as well as occasionally being observed in the very southern tip of Western Australia below Perth. It is a widespread and versatile plant but generally requires moist growing conditions and partial to full shade. As such, Isolepis platycarpa is often found in swamp scrubs but is also found in moist soils in non-wetland areas.

Commonly co-occurring species include Schoenus nitens, Isolepis cernua, and Centrolepis strigose. These species are most commonly found together in moist herbfields and marginal wetlands.

== Conservation ==
Isolepis platycarpa is considered a rare native nationally and has a “significant” conservation status within the Yarra Ranges in Victoria.
