= Pennsylvania Route 965 =

State highway in Pennsylvania, US

Pennsylvania Route 965

Route information
- Maintained by PennDOT
- Length: 11.552 mi (18.591 km)

Major junctions
- West end: US 62 in Jackson Township
- East end: US 62 in Frenchcreek Township

Location
- Country: United States
- State: Pennsylvania
- Counties: Mercer, Venango

Highway system
- Pennsylvania State Route System; Interstate; US; State; Scenic; Legislative
← PA 964	→ PA 966

Pennsylvania Route 965 (PA 965) is an 11.6-mile-long (18.7 km) state highway located in Mercer County and Venango County, Pennsylvania. The route terminates at each end at U.S. Route 62 (US 62). In the west, it begins in Jackson Township, before traveling through rural areas to its end in Frenchcreek Township.

== Route description ==
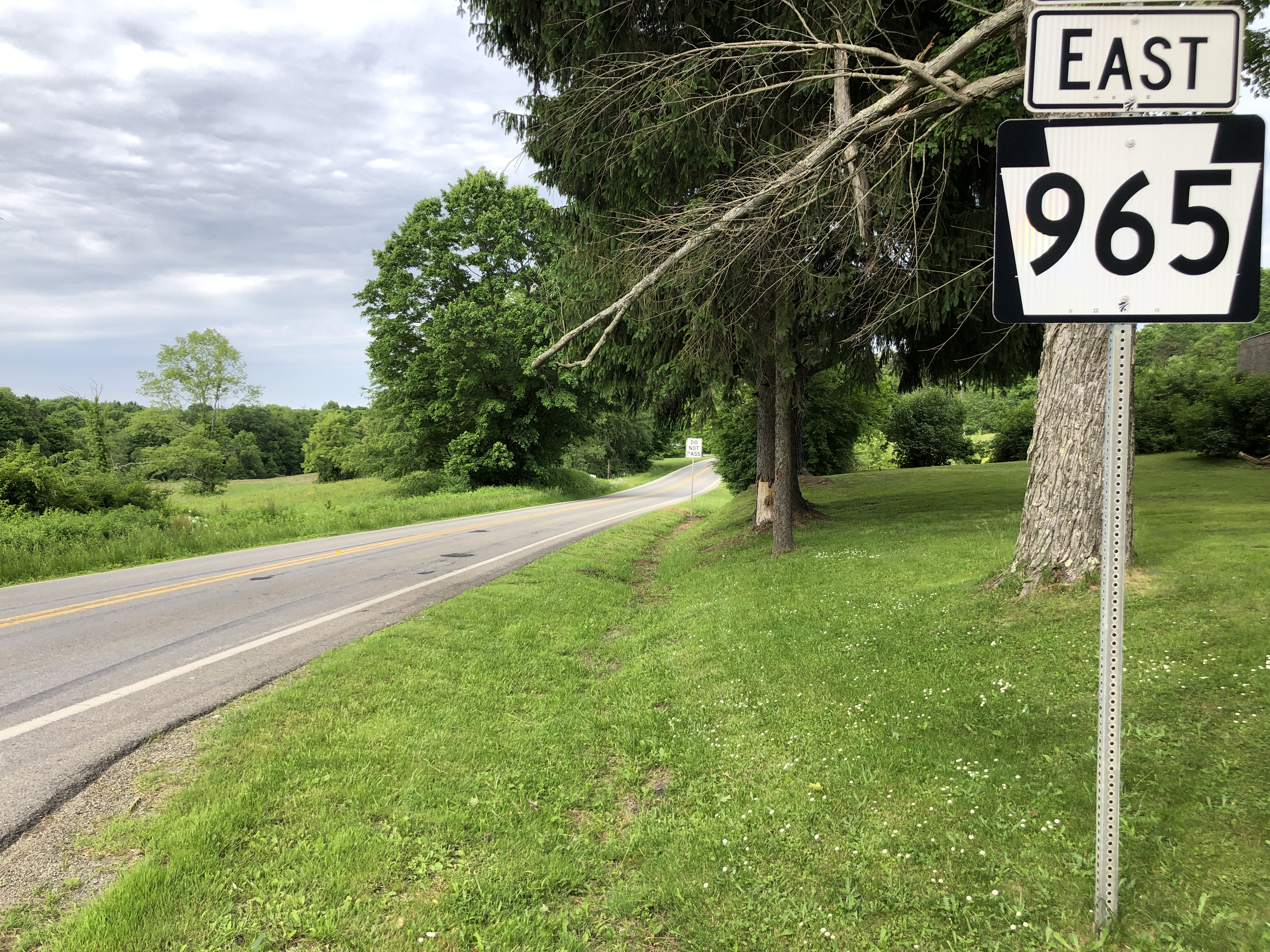
PA 965 eastbound in Worth Township

PA 965 begins at an intersection with US 62 in the community of Nesbits Corners in Jackson Township, Mercer County, heading east-northeast on two-lane undivided Henderson Road. The road passes through a mix of farms and woods with some homes before passing through open agricultural areas and crossing into Worth Township. The route becomes Jackson Center Polk Road and runs through wooded areas with some fields and residences, crossing PA 173 in Perrine Corners. Past this intersection, PA 965 heads northeast through more rural areas and passes through Henderson. PA 965 enters Mineral Township in Venango County and heads through forested areas with some homes, passing through the community of Mount Pleasant. The road continues northeast through more woodland with some farmland and residences. Farther northeast, PA 965 crosses the Sandy Creek into Frenchcreek Township and ends at another intersection with US 62 in Waterloo Bridge.

== Major intersections ==
County	Location	mi	km	Destinations	Notes
Mercer	Jackson Township	0.000	0.000	US 62 (Franklin Road) – Mercer, Stoneboro, Sandy Lake	Western terminus
Mercer	Worth Township	2.945	4.740	PA 173 (Sandy Lake-Grove City Road) – Sandy Lake, Grove City	
Venango	Frenchcreek Township	11.552	18.591	US 62 (Mercer Road) – Polk, Franklin	Eastern terminus
1.000 mi = 1.609 km; 1.000 km = 0.621 mi
