= Frenchman Creek =

Frenchman Creek, Frenchman's Creek, or Frenchmans Creek may refer to:

- Frenchman Creek (Missouri), a stream in Missouri
- Frenchman's Creek, one of seven creeks on the Helford River, Cornwall.
- Frenchman Creek (Republican River), a stream in Colorado and Nebraska
- Frenchmans Creek (California), a river in the United States of America
- Frenchmans Creek (New South Wales), a river in Australia
- Frenchman Creek (Montana), a river in Saskatchewan, Canada, and Montana, United States. In Canada, it is known as "Frenchman River".
- Battle of Frenchman's Creek, battle in the War of 1812
- Frenchman's Creek (novel), 1942 historical novel by Daphne du Maurier
  - Frenchman's Creek (film), 1944 film adaptation of the novel
