= McCullough Creek =

McCullough Creek may refer to:

- McCullough Creek (British Columbia), a tributary of the Goldstream River
- McCullough Creek (Florida), a stream in Polk County
