= Worth Township, Pennsylvania =

Worth Township is the name of some places in the U.S. state of Pennsylvania:

- Worth Township, Butler County, Pennsylvania
- Worth Township, Centre County, Pennsylvania
- Worth Township, Mercer County, Pennsylvania
