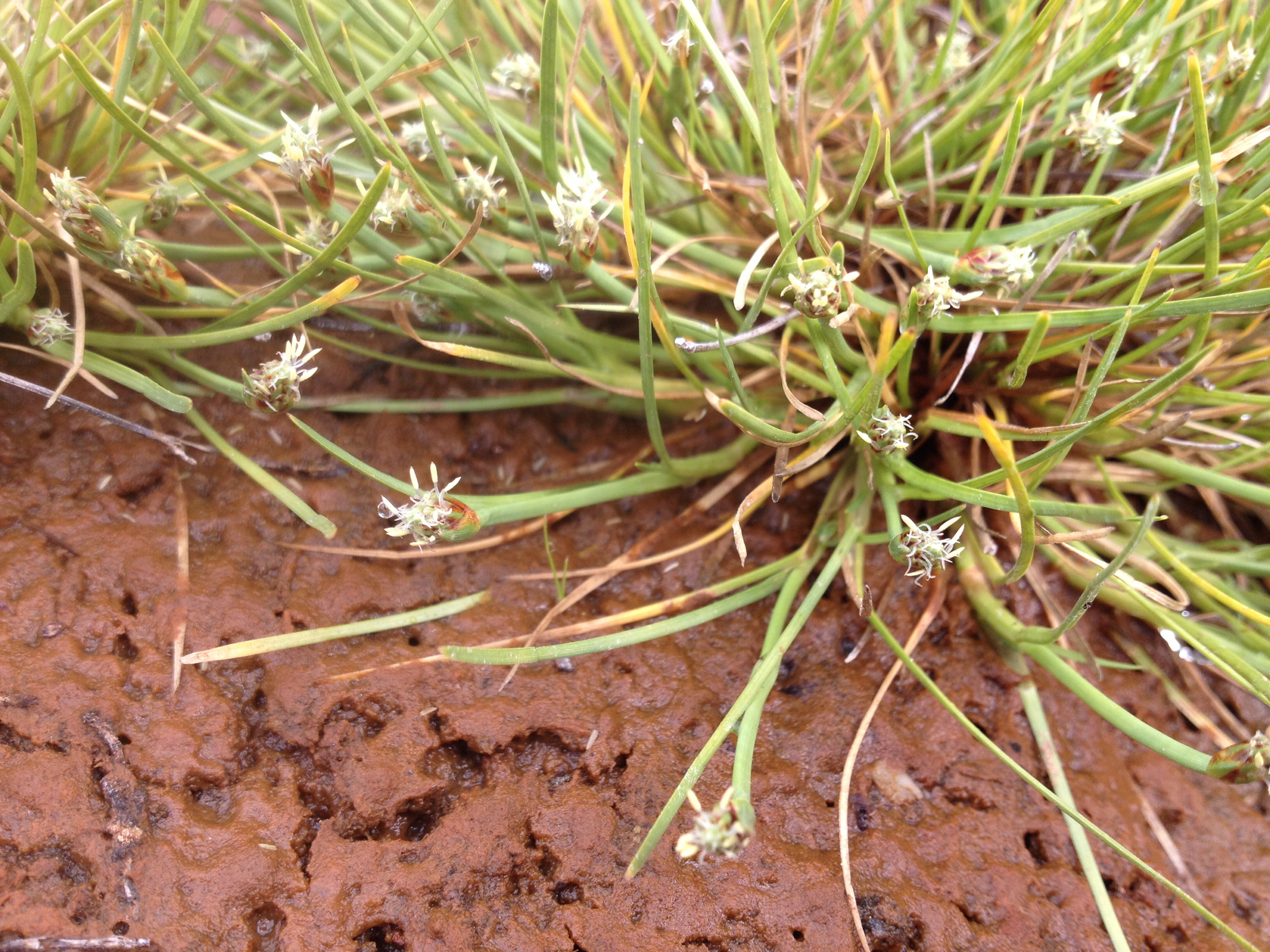

Scientific classification
- Kingdom: Plantae
- Clade: Tracheophytes
- Clade: Angiosperms
- Clade: Monocots
- Clade: Commelinids
- Order: Poales
- Family: Cyperaceae
- Genus: Isolepis
- Species: I. crassiuscula

Binomial name
- Isolepis crassiuscula Hook. f.

Synonyms
- Scirpus crassiusculus (Hook.f.) Benth.

= Isolepis crassiuscula =

Species of grass-like plant

Isolepis crassiuscula is a species of flowering plant in the sedge family. It is native to Australasia and Japan. It was first described by the botanist Joseph Dalton Hooker in 1859.
