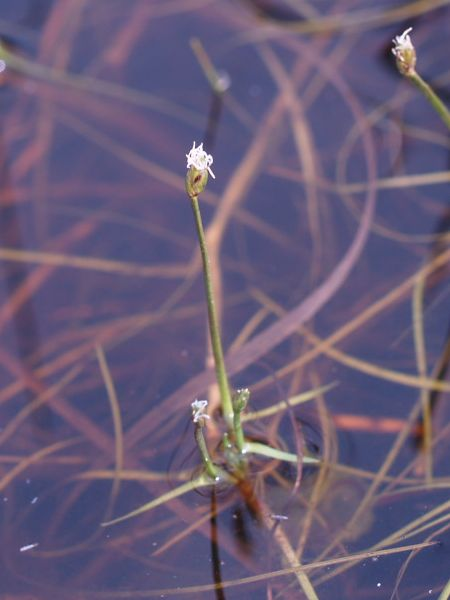

Scientific classification
- Kingdom: Plantae
- Clade: Tracheophytes
- Clade: Angiosperms
- Clade: Monocots
- Clade: Commelinids
- Order: Poales
- Family: Cyperaceae
- Genus: Isolepis
- Species: I. fluitans

Binomial name
- Isolepis fluitans (L.) R.Br.

Synonyms
- Scirpus fluitans L.; Eleogiton fluitans (L.) Link

= Isolepis fluitans =

Species of grass-like plant

Isolepis fluitans (syn. Scirpus fluitans), the floating scirpus, is a species of flowering plant in the sedge family. It is native to Africa, Australasia, Europe, and the Pacific islands. It was first described by Carl Linnaeus in 1753, and later transferred to Isolepis by the botanist Robert Brown in 1810.

The species epithet fluitans is Latin for floating.

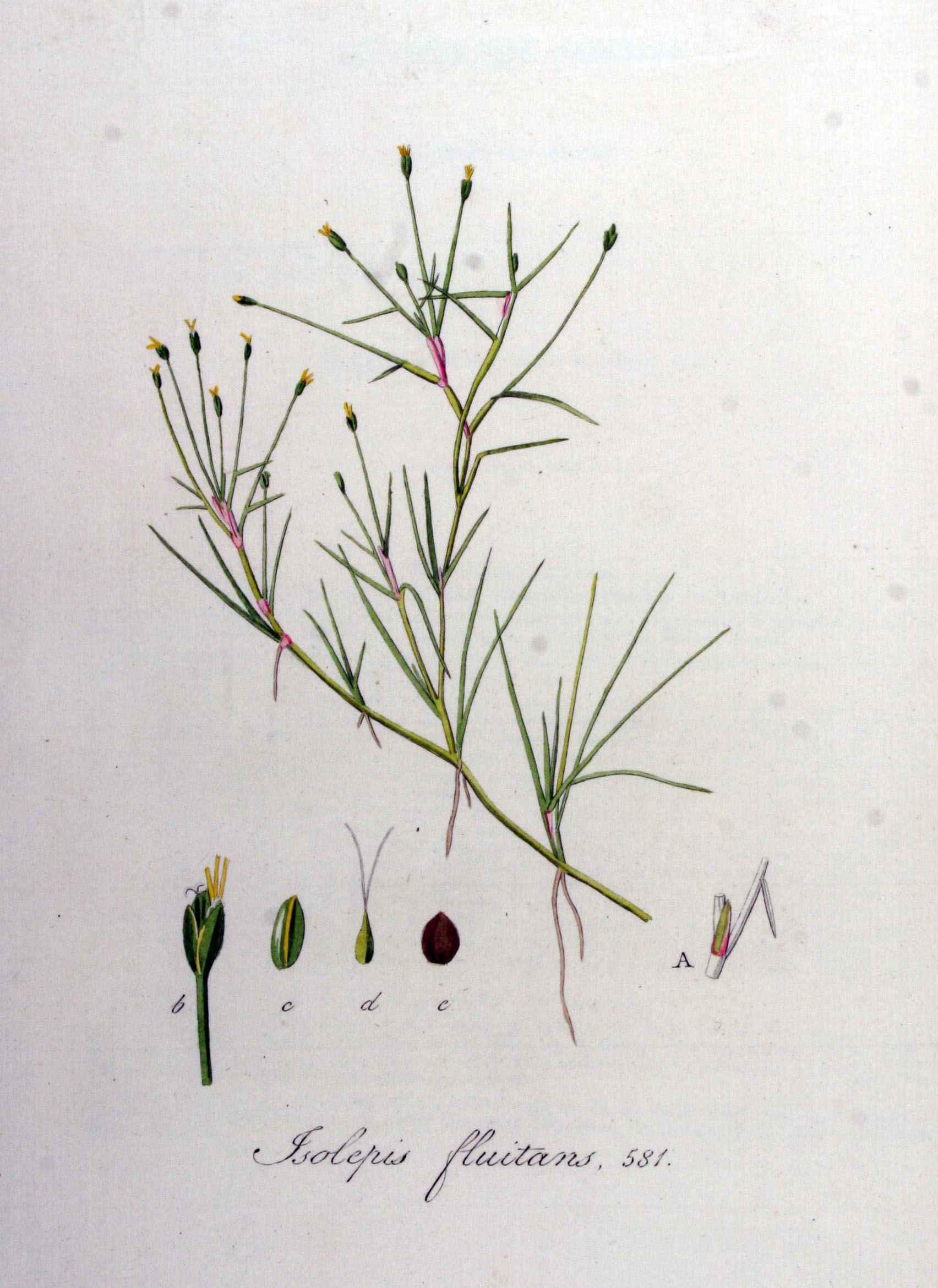
An illustration of an Isolepis fluitans
