= Carnes Creek =

Creek in British Columbia, Canada

Coordinates: 51.2927°N 118.1846°W

Carnes Creek is a creek located in the Big Bend Country region of British Columbia. The flows into the Columbia River from the east. It was discovered no later than 1865. The creek has been mined and has produced $200,000 in gold.
