= Mineral Township, Pennsylvania =

Township in Pennsylvania, US

Coordinates: 41°18′00″N 79°57′59″W

Mineral Township, Venango County, Pennsylvania
- Township
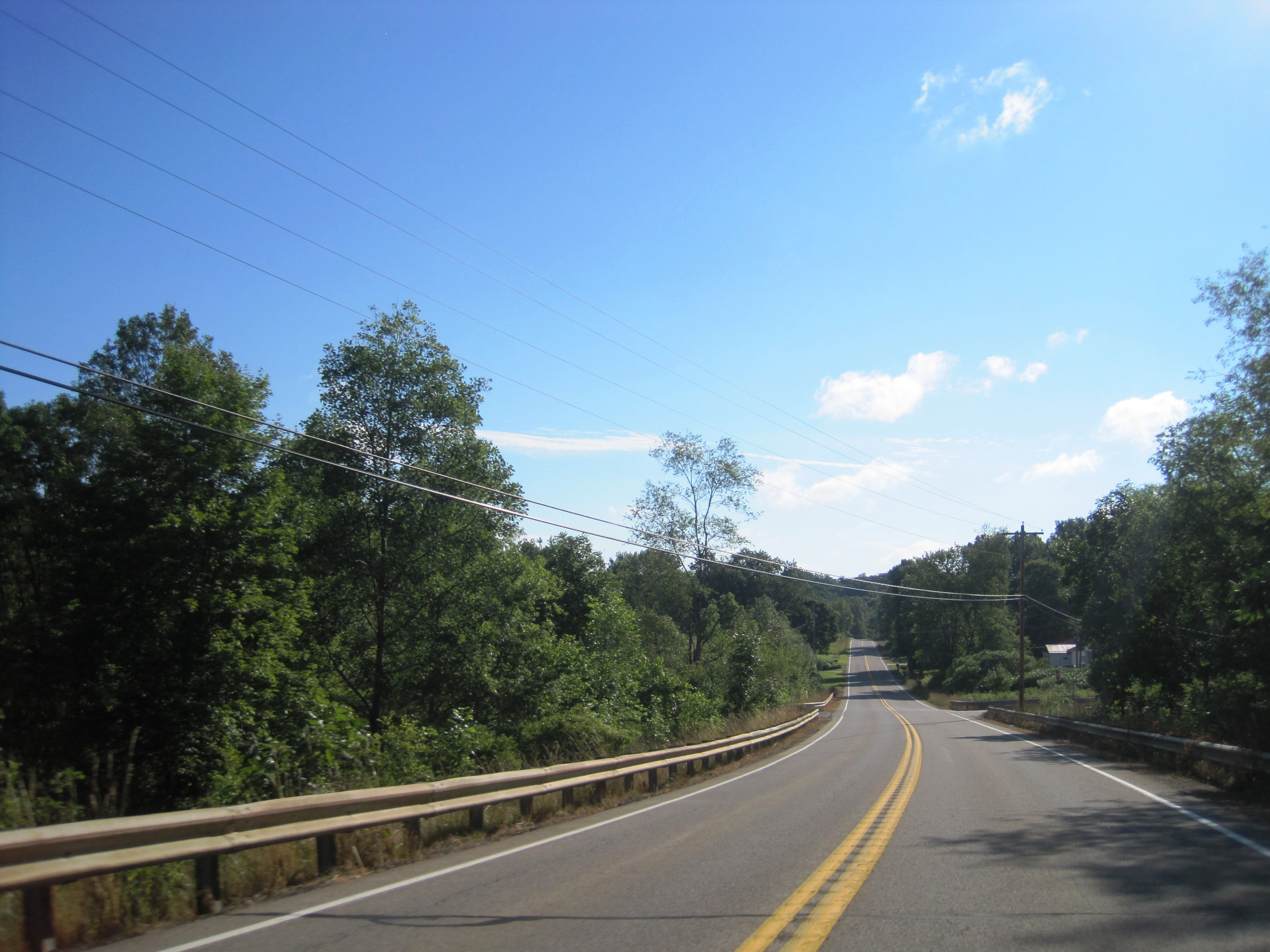
- PA 965 eastbound in Mineral Township

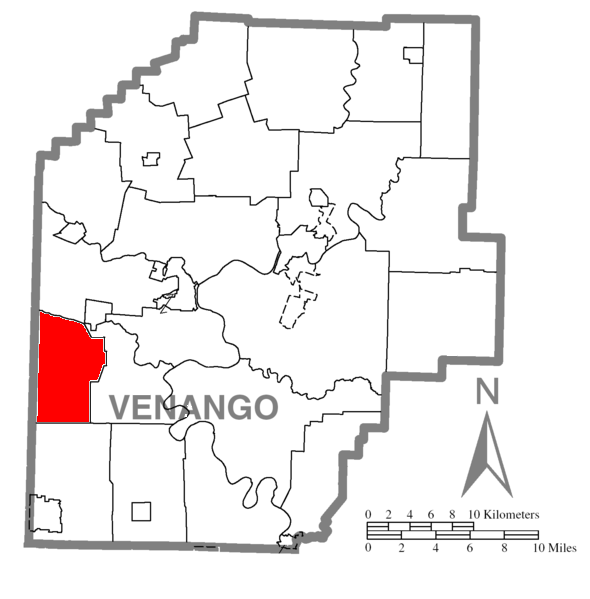
- Map of Venango County, Pennsylvania highlighting Mineral Township

- Map of Venango County, Pennsylvania
- Country: United States
- State: Pennsylvania
- County: Venango
- Settled: 1797
- Incorporated: 1870

Government
  - Type: Board of Supervisors

Area
  - Total: 22.27 sq mi (57.69 km^{2})
  - Land: 22.27 sq mi (57.69 km^{2})
  - Water: 0 sq mi (0.00 km^{2})

Population (2020)
  - Total: 496 ▼
  - Estimate (2024): 483
  - Density: 23/sq mi (9/km^{2})
- Time zone: UTC-5 (Eastern (EST))
  - Summer (DST): UTC-4 (EDT)
- Area code: 814
- FIPS code: 42-121-50048

Mineral Township is a township in Venango County, Pennsylvania, United States. The population was 496 at the 2020 census, a decrease from 538 in the 2010 census, which was, in turn, a gain over the 533 residents tabulated in 2000.

== Geography ==
According to the United States Census Bureau, the township has a total area of 22.5 square miles (58.3 km^{2}), all land.

== Demographics ==
Historical population
Census	Pop.	Note	%±
2000	533		—
2010	538		0.9%
2020	496		−7.8%
2024 (est.)	483		−2.6%
U.S. Decennial Census

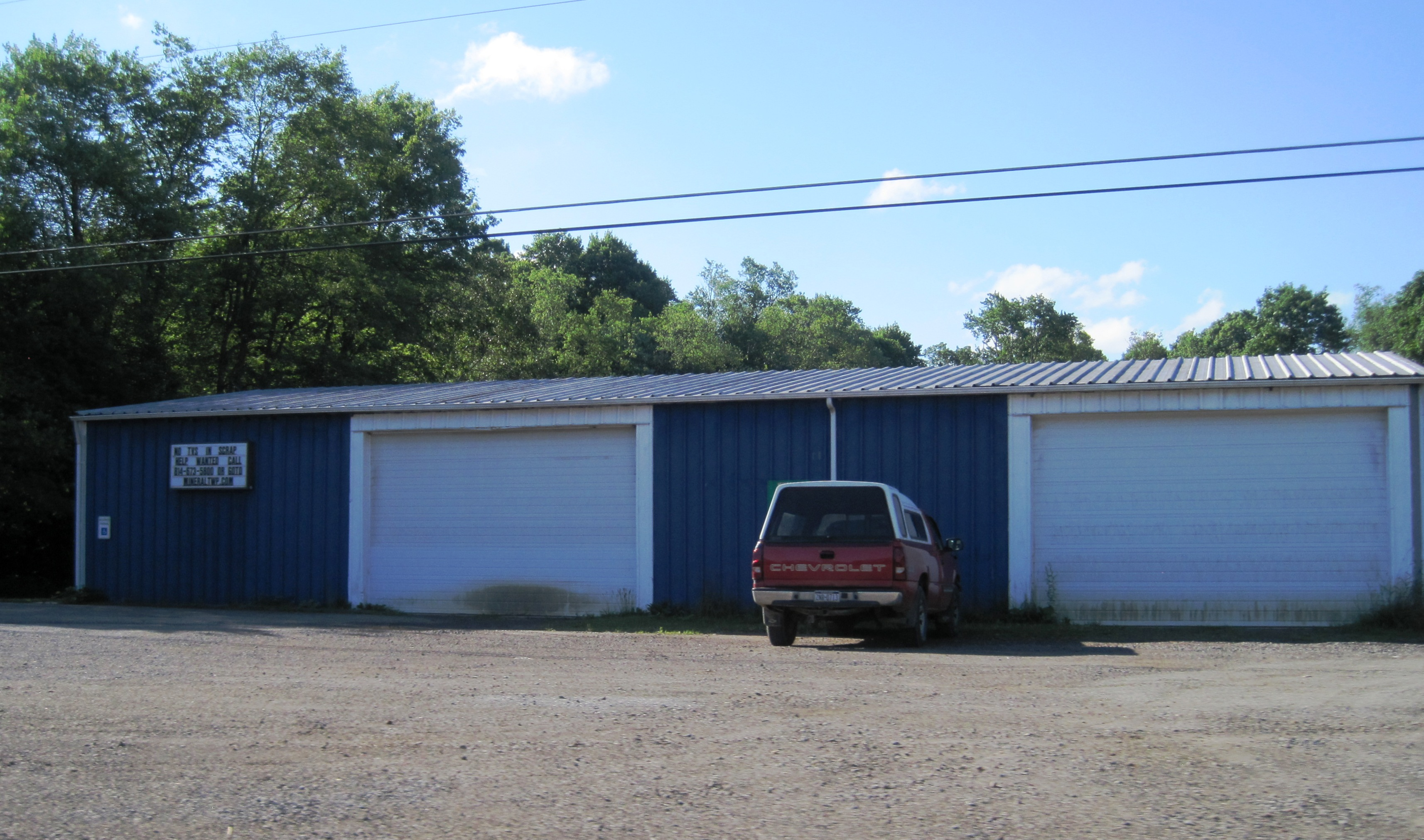
Mineral Town Hall

As of the census of 2000, there were 533 people, 208 households, and 174 families residing in the township. The population density was 23.7 people per square mile (9.1/km^{2}). There were 274 housing units at an average density of 12.2/sq mi (4.7/km^{2}). The racial makeup of the township was 98.31% White, 0.19% Native American, 0.75% Asian, and 0.75% from two or more races.

There were 208 households, out of which 30.3% had children under the age of 18 living with them, 73.1% were married couples living together, 5.8% had a female householder with no husband present, and 16.3% were non-families. 13.5% of all households were made up of individuals, and 7.2% had someone living alone who was 65 years of age or older. The average household size was 2.56 and the average family size was 2.80.

In the township the population was spread out, with 20.8% under the age of 18, 5.1% from 18 to 24, 30.8% from 25 to 44, 29.5% from 45 to 64, and 13.9% who were 65 years of age or older. The median age was 41 years. For every 100 females, there were 106.6 males. For every 100 females age 18 and over, there were 106.9 males.

The median income for a household in the township was $37,500, and the median income for a family was $39,773. Males had a median income of $31,731 versus $29,375 for females. The per capita income for the township was $15,945. About 6.1% of families and 7.7% of the population were below the poverty line, including 11.8% of those under age 18 and 2.9% of those age 65 or over.
