= French Creek Township, Pennsylvania =

French Creek Township, Pennsylvania, can refer to two townships in Pennsylvania

- French Creek Township, Mercer County, Pennsylvania
- Frenchcreek Township, Pennsylvania
