= Big Bend Country =

Section of Columbia River, British Columbia, Canada

Coordinates: 52.1075°N 118.5022°W

In the Canadian province of British Columbia, Big Bend Country is the region around the northernmost section of the Columbia River, which changes from a northwestward course along the Rocky Mountain Trench to curve around the northern end of the Selkirk Mountains to head southwest between that range and the Monashee Mountains, which lie to the west. The area is part of the larger Columbia Country, which includes the Columbia Valley and upper Arrow Lakes of eastern British Columbia. The 2,300 square miles (6,000 km^{2}) north of the railway line, and enclosed by the river, roughly defines the Big Bend. However, in earlier eras, the descriptive was more narrowly understood.

== History ==
=== Explorers ===
Familiar with the river for navigation, the Big Bend is a traditional territory of the Secwepemc (Shuswap) people, but is also claimed by the Ktunaxa. The Blackfoot raided and at times occupied the area.

David Thompson of the Hudson's Bay Company, and later the North West Company, was the first European to travel the upper reaches of the Columbia. In 1811, he landed at the confluence of the Canoe River at what became known as Boat Encampment, near the most northerly point of the bend. This site became a long-established fur trading cache and campsite on the annual York Factory Express. David Douglas visited in 1827. Paul Kane made oil sketches depicting the area in the late 1840s.

In 1864, Governor Frederick Seymour commissioned George Turner to find a suitable route for a road from the coast to the Kootenays. Descending the Columbia from Boat Encampment, his party profitably panned gold while prospecting on the river bars. Scattered groups were panning the tributaries.

In 1865, the government dispatched Walter Moberly to explore from Kamloops to the Canadian Rockies, a partly successful venture. He was the first gold commissioner in the Big Bend area. The next year, he laid out the French Creek settlement site, and developed trails from La Porte, the head of navigation, to the mining creeks.

=== Prospecting & mining ===
The Big Bend Gold Rush of 1866 was insignificant compared to other discoveries. In 1869, 37 miners remained at French Creek, and none on the other creeks. Little mining activity occurred 1871–1885. With the arrival of the railway, mining resumed on Carnes, French, McCullough, and Gaffney (Smith) creeks, and the Goldstream. In 1888, heavy snow damaged the Carnes equipment, forcing abandonment. The Revelstoke miners' association, formed in 1890, failed to achieve its lobbying goals. That decade, an operation on McCullough proved to be an investment scam. The French Creek Hydraulic Co. received 20 tons of equipment in 1897, but collapsed the following year. Since 1900, little mining development has occurred.

=== Logging ===
Established in 1941, Hamber Provincial Park initially included virtually all the eastern part of the enclosed area. However, the federal government merely wanted a narrow road reserve along 18.6 miles (30 km) of the developing highway. Over the years, many timber licences had been issued, but accessibility beyond the railway line prevented logging. The province asked the federal government to buy up these licences. Unsuccessful, the province created a massive park to attract federal acquisition, and the transfer of highway maintenance obligations. The gesture was ignored. Eventually, the park was reopened for logging. When parts were submerged by the reservoir of the Mica Dam, there was insufficient time to clear extensive areas of forest.

=== Transportation ===
==== Steamboats ====
SS Forty-Nine provided a Marcus (WA)–La Porte service during 1866, but this dwindled, ceasing in 1871. In the absence of such services, pack trains supplied miners until 1897. SS Lytton operated Revelstoke–La Porte during 1897. In 1901, the Revelstoke Navigation Co. was formed to operate north of Revelstoke. SS Revelstoke ran Revelstoke–La Porte twice weekly 1902–1915 while river depths permitted. After the 1915 fire that destroyed the vessel, all steamer service to Big Bend ceased.

==== Railways ====
During the westward advance of the Canadian Pacific Railway (CP) transcontinental during the early 1880s, the alternatives of crossing the Selkirks or following the Big Bend were examined. Since the immediate capital costs were similar, the additional operating costs expected from the increased mileage eliminated the latter. During 1902–1907, Walter Moberly pressed CP to bypass the gradient problems of Kicking Horse Pass and Rogers Pass by rerouting via the Big Bend to Howse Pass and Red Deer. The existing route could remain for lighter traffic or be abandoned. However, the loss of benefits developed with communities along the existing route, and the cost of route realignments for even shorter schemes, far outweighed the cost of reducing the existing deficiencies.

Moberly believed the significant employee fatalities in the March 1910 Rogers Pass avalanche, might prompt CP to reconsider the Big Bend route. However, when CP surveyed the area that summer, potential timber and minerals development appeared the motive. Little mentioned was the Canadian Northern Railway (CNoR) proposal announced that April to build a branch line from Tête Jaune south to Big Bend, forking to Revelstoke and Golden. In July, CP proposed to duplicate that route. Construction was expected to start in the spring. By 1912, it was evident that CP would not be building in the immediate future. CP typically pursued policies that blocked a competitor's advance, and only built marginal lines after the strategy failed. The CNoR westward advance would not reach the Tête Jaune locality until late 1914. Lacking the capital resources, CNoR could ill afford to compete with CP on a minor branch route.

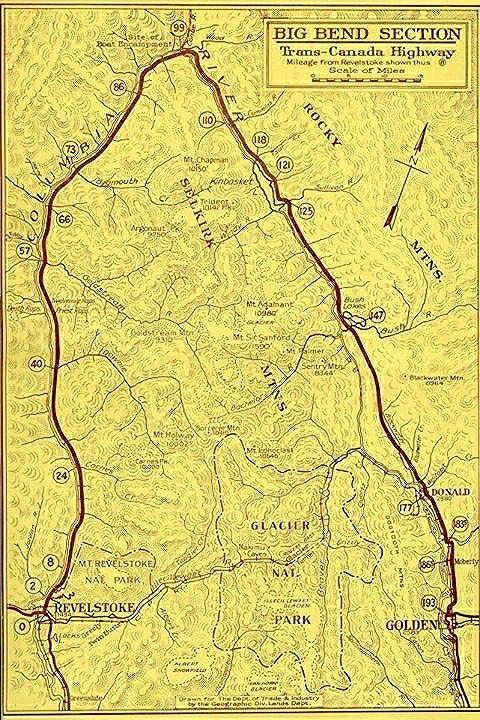
Big Bend Highway, 1940.

==== Trails & roads ====
Miners wore trails into and within the Big Bend. The government built rough pack trails between diggings. After 1866, nature reclaimed most trails. In 1884, a 43-mile (69 km) wagon road connected Shuswap Lake with Big Eddy. As was their custom, CP obliterated much of this road on constructing the railway. In 1922, this link was rebuilt as part of the Okanagan–Revelstoke highway.

By 1891, a rough trail north to Eight Mile Falls existed. George LaForme operated pack trains to Big Bend during 1889–1905, and provided a free public ferry at the mouth of McCullough Creek. A short wagon road was under construction in 1900, but by 1928 had only covered the 26 miles (42 km) to Carnes Creek. In 1927 the Golden–Lake Louise road opened, leaving only the Revelstoke–Golden gap. CP carried motorists' vehicles as freight on flatcars between these points.

A Selkirks route rejected because of snowfall and avalanches, the Big Bend Highway construction spanned 1929–1940. A proposal to upgrade to Trans-Canada Highway standards a decade later, determined that the Selkirks option would be cheaper, and not conflict with the Columbia River hydro-electric potential. The successor highway through Rogers Pass opened in 1962.

All that remains of the former highway on the eastern side is a forestry services road, comprising about half the original length, and on the western side is Highway 23 to the apex, near Mica Creek, the only sizable settlement. However, this route was moved to higher ground to accommodate the reservoirs of the Mica and Revelstoke dams.
