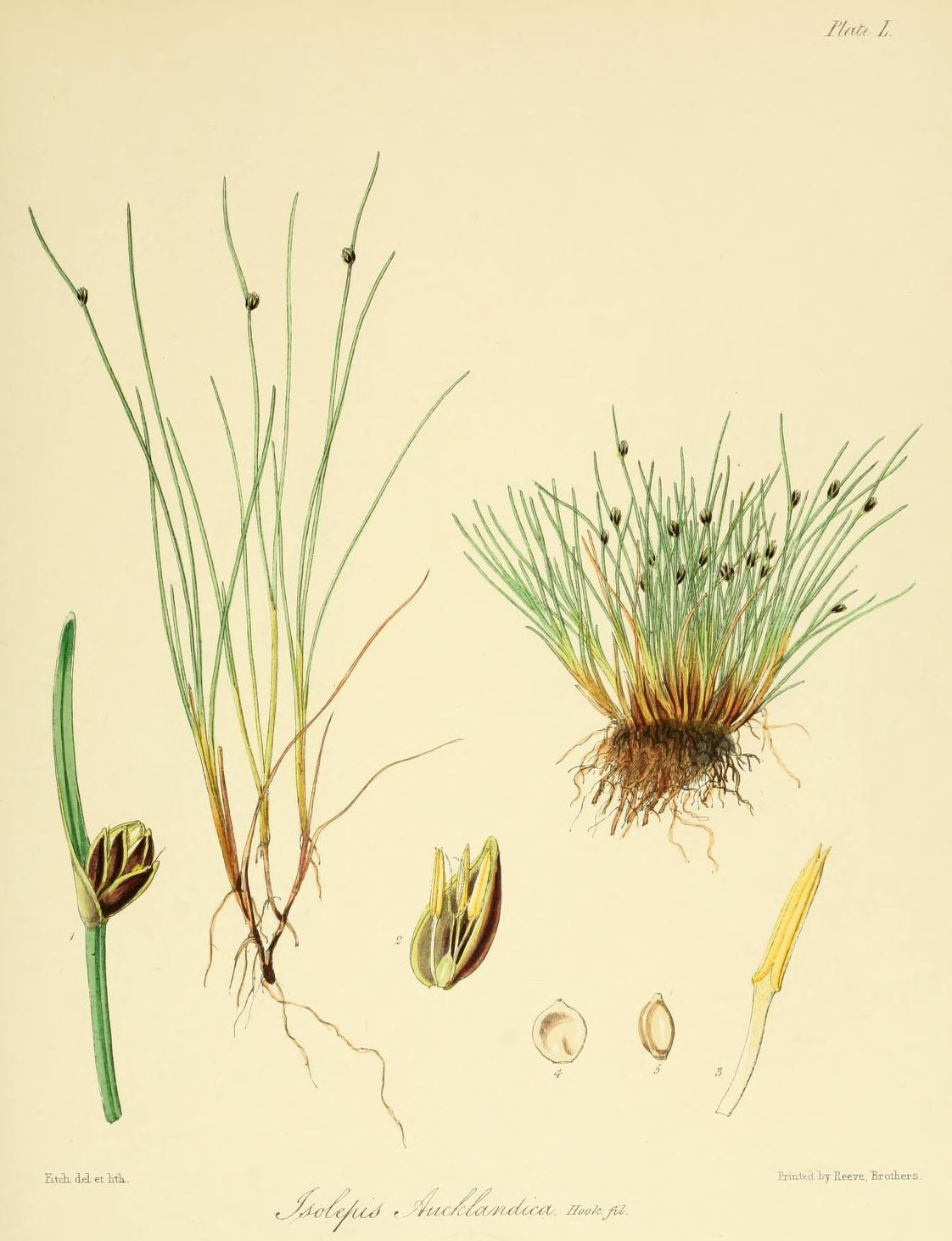
- Plate L

Scientific classification
- Kingdom: Plantae
- Clade: Tracheophytes
- Clade: Angiosperms
- Clade: Monocots
- Clade: Commelinids
- Order: Poales
- Family: Cyperaceae
- Genus: Isolepis
- Species: I. aucklandica

Binomial name
- Isolepis aucklandica Hook.f

Synonyms
- Isolepis subcucullata Berggr. Scirpus aucklandicus (Hook.f.) Boeckeler; Scirpus muscosus Kirk; Scirpus subcucullatus (Berggr.) Berggr.

= Isolepis aucklandica =

Species of grass-like plant

Isolepis aucklandica is a species of flowering plant in the Cyperaceae family. It is native to New Zealand, Australia, Argentina, Peru, Colombia, Ecuador, Macquarie Island, the French Southern Territories of Saint Paul and Amsterdam Islands, and New Guinea.

== Description ==
It is a creeping, bright green, leafy, rhizomatous sedge which forms large patches of turf. The culms (10.0–80.0 by about 0.5 mm) are a bright green above, but red-brown towards the base. There are up to 6 leaves per culm, and the leaves are usually longer than the culms. The sheaths are often streaked with red, and sometimes entirely a dark red-purple. The inflorescence consists of 1–2 narrow-oblong spikelets (1.0–4.0 by 0.5–2 mm) which are partly hidden by the base of the subtending bract which is up to 5 times length of spikelet. There are three stamens and three style-branches . The shining nut is 1–2 mm long by about 0.5 mm wide, triangular in cross-section with rounded angles, almost white to yellowish, or grey- to red-brown, and it tapers towards its black tip.

It flowers from October to December and fruits from November to May.

== Habitat ==
It is found on the coast and up to 1300 m altitude, in boggy ground in forests and wetlands and seepages.

== Distribution ==
Within Australia, it is found in Tasmania, Victoria and New South Wales.

== Conservation status ==
This species was classified as "Not Threatened" in 2012 under the New Zealand Threat Classification System, and the same in 2018.
