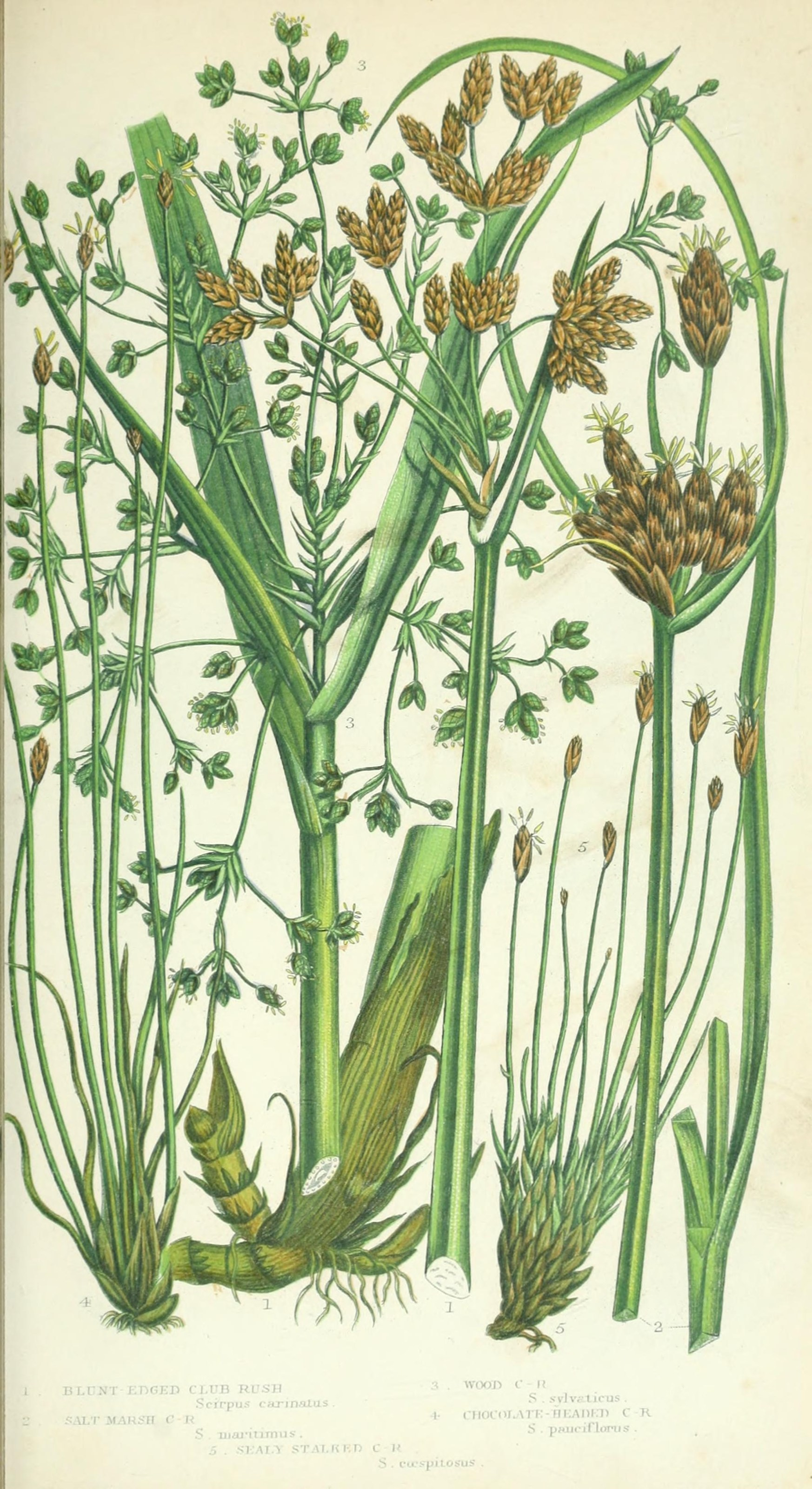
- Figure 1 depicts Isolepis carinata

Scientific classification
- Kingdom: Plantae
- Clade: Tracheophytes
- Clade: Angiosperms
- Clade: Monocots
- Clade: Commelinids
- Order: Poales
- Family: Cyperaceae
- Genus: Isolepis
- Species: I. carinata

Binomial name
- Isolepis carinata Hook. & Arn. ex Torr.

= Isolepis carinata =

Species of grass-like plant

Isolepis carinata (syn. Scirpus koilolepis) is a species of flowering plant in the sedge family known by the common name keeled bulrush. It is native to North America, where it is mostly distributed around the southeastern United States; it can also be found on the California coast. It grows in many types of moist and wet habitat, including disturbed, cultivated, and landscaped areas. It is an annual herb producing clumps of slender, erect stems up to 25 centimeters tall. The inflorescence is a solitary spikelet just a few millimeters long, or a cluster of up to three spikelets. These are accompanied by a stiff bract which looks like an extension of the stem growing past the spikelets.
