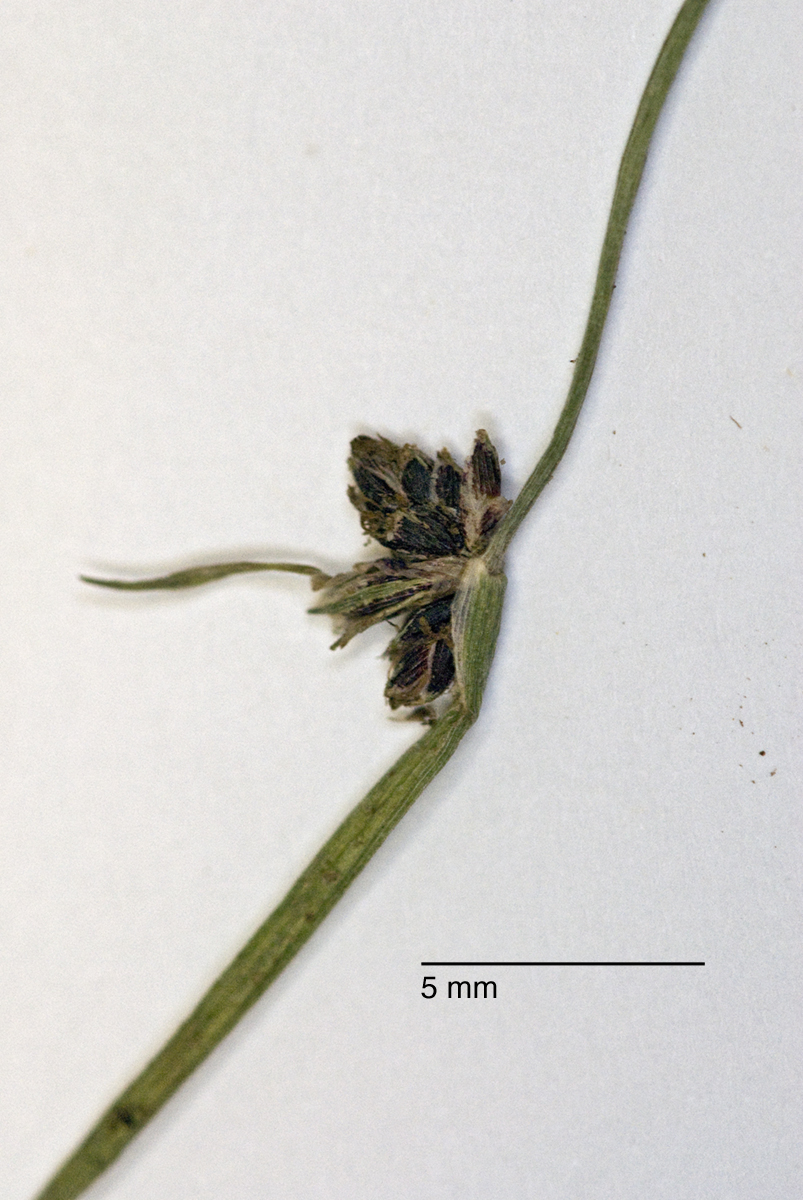

Scientific classification
- Kingdom: Plantae
- Clade: Tracheophytes
- Clade: Angiosperms
- Clade: Monocots
- Clade: Commelinids
- Order: Poales
- Family: Cyperaceae
- Genus: Isolepis
- Species: I. habra

Binomial name
- Isolepis habra (Edgar) Soják

Synonyms
- Scirpus habrus Edgar

= Isolepis habra =

Species of grass-like plant

Isolepis habra is a species of flowering plant in the sedge family. A small, tufted perennial plant growing to 30 cm tall, seen in south eastern Australia and New Zealand.
