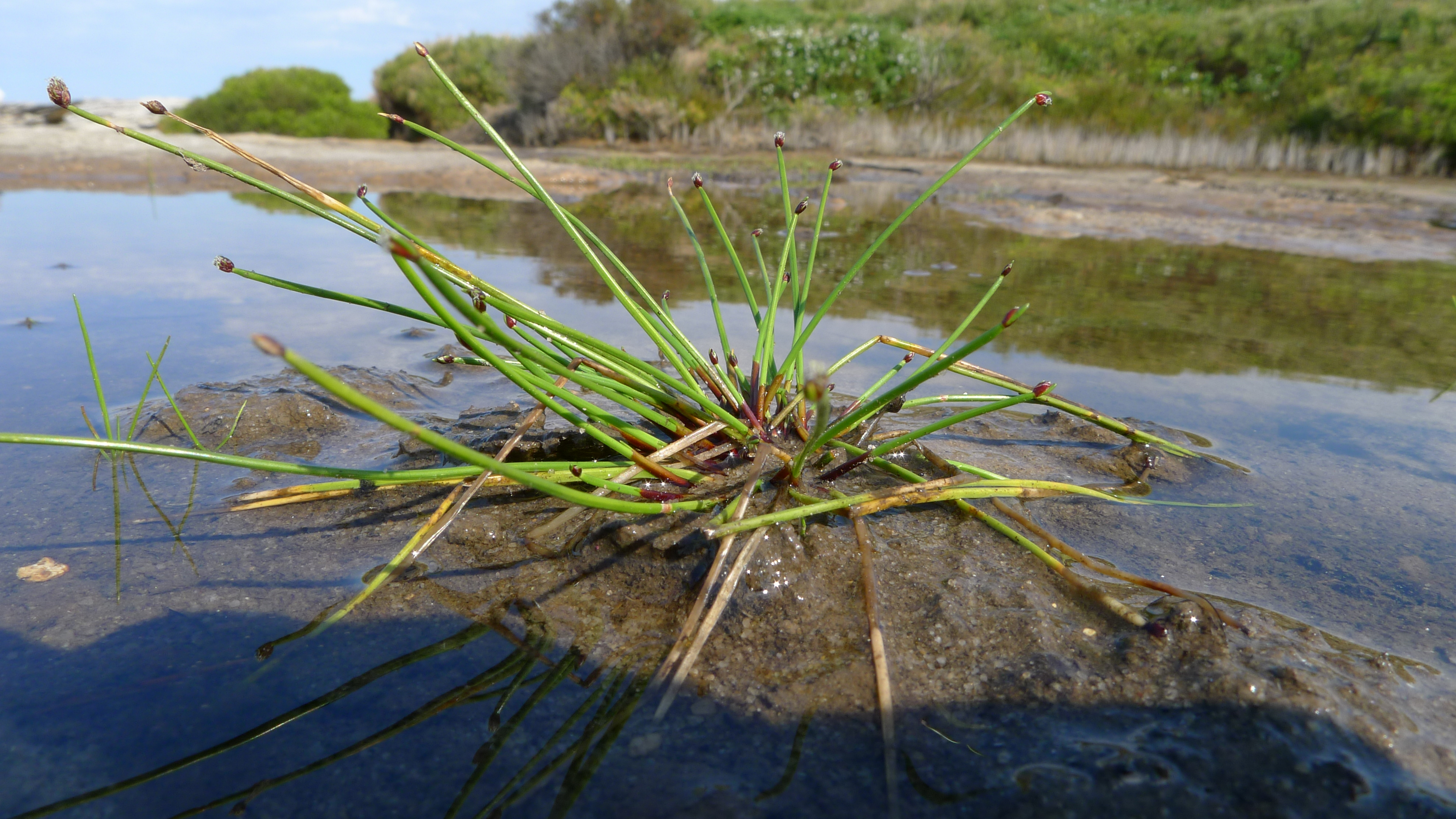

Scientific classification
- Kingdom: Plantae
- Clade: Tracheophytes
- Clade: Angiosperms
- Clade: Monocots
- Clade: Commelinids
- Order: Poales
- Family: Cyperaceae
- Genus: Isolepis
- Species: I. producta

Binomial name
- Isolepis producta (C.B.Clarke) K.L.Wilson

Synonyms
- Scirpus productus C.B.Clarke

= Isolepis producta =

Species of grass-like plant

Isolepis producta is a species of flowering plant in the sedge family. A small aquatic plant seen in southern Australia. The habitat is lagoons, lakes and streams.
