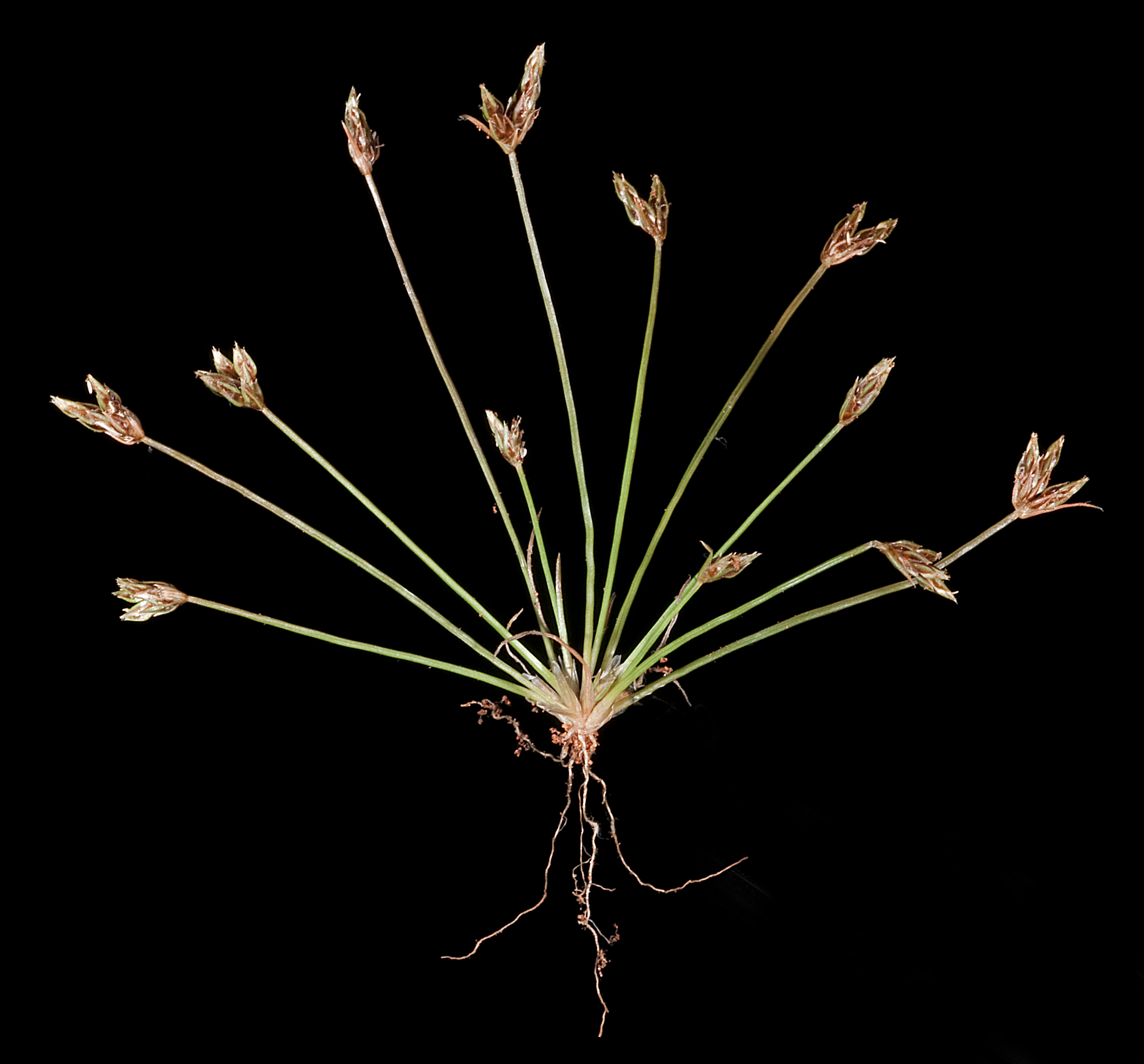

Scientific classification
- Kingdom: Plantae
- Clade: Tracheophytes
- Clade: Angiosperms
- Clade: Monocots
- Clade: Commelinids
- Order: Poales
- Family: Cyperaceae
- Genus: Isolepis
- Species: I. congrua

Binomial name
- Isolepis congrua Nees

Synonyms
- Scirpus congruus (Nees) S.T.Blake; Scirpus kochii Maiden & Betche

= Isolepis congrua =

Slender Club-sedge

Species of grass-like plant

Isolepis congrua, the slender club-sedge, is a species of flowering plant in the sedge family. A small, tufted annual plant growing to 20 cm tall, often seen in the Australian Outback.
