= French Creek Wildlife Area =

State Wildlife Area in Wisconsin

- French Creek State Wildlife Area
- IUCN category V (protected landscape/seascape)
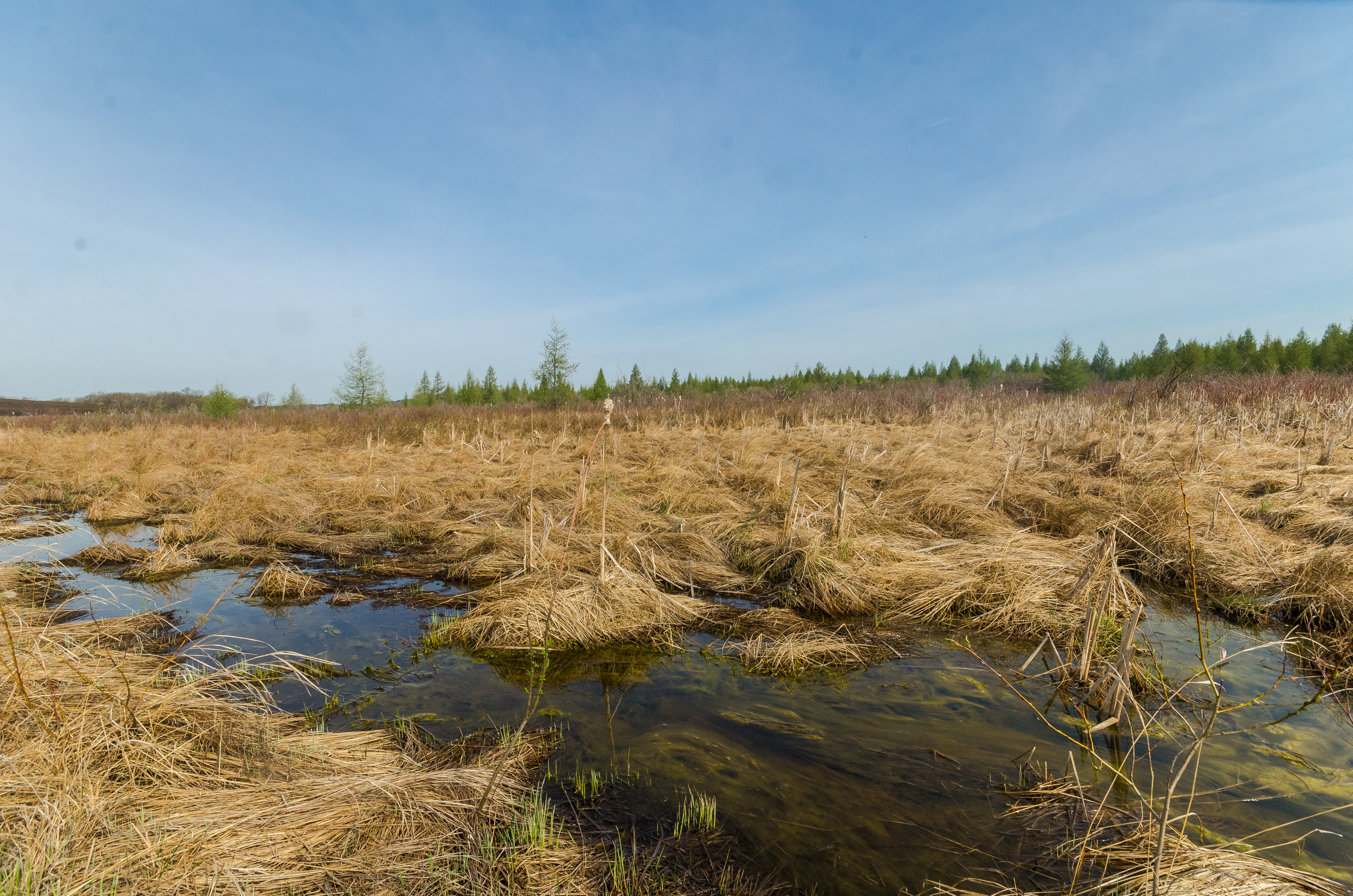

- Location within Wisconsin Location within the United States
- Location: Columbia County and Marquette County, Wisconsin
- Nearest city: Portage, WI
- Coordinates: 43°37′16″N 89°24′2″W
- Area: 3,506 acres (14.19 km^{2})
- Established: 1947
- Governing body: Wisconsin Department of Natural Resources

The French Creek Wildlife Area is a 3,506 acres (1,419 ha) tract of protected land located in Columbia County and Marquette County, Wisconsin, managed by the Wisconsin Department of Natural Resources (WDNR). Land to be used for the wildlife area was first acquired in 1947 to provide for increased production of wildfowl and hunting opportunities. Prior to 1947, the area was used for the cultivation of wire grass which is used for the creation of grass rugs and mats.

== French Creek ==
The French Creek Wildlife Area is trisected into three different areas; the all-encompassing French Creek Wildlife Area, the French Creek North Natural Area, and the French Creek Fen Natural Area. The French Creek North Natural Area is a 1,439 acres (582 ha) exclave of the wildlife area consisting of mostly wetland and some shallow open water sections. The French Creek Fen Natural Area, however, is found within the defined borders of the French Creek Wildlife Area, and has an area of 219 acres (89 ha).

There are 14 different types of cover in the wildlife area, including agriculture, aspen, central hardwood, developed, forested wetland, grassland, marsh, oak woodland, shrub wetland, tamarack, upland conifer, upland shrub, water, and the most common, sedge meadows.

Cover type acreage
Cover type	Acres	Percentage cover
Agriculture	51	1%
Aspen	50	1%
Central hardwood	10	<1%
Developed	4	<1%
Forested wetland	36	1%
Grassland	545	16%
Marsh	490	14%
Oak woodland	490	14%
Sedge meadows	850	24%
Shrub wetland	650	19%
Tamarack	140	4%
Upland conifer	25	<1%
Upland shrub	15	<1%
Water	150	4%
Total acreage	3,506	100%

== Flora and fauna ==
The most prominent species of trees that can be found in the wildlife area are oak and tamarack, in addition to various other hardwood trees native to the region. The wildlife area is otherwise dominated by sedges, a grass-like plant.

A popular activity in the wildlife area is hunting, with there being a sizable population of deer, turkey, and other wildfowl in the area. There is currently a pheasant restocking program in the wildlife area, which furthers the agenda of turning the area into a sustainable hunting preserve.

== See also ==
- Wildlife management
