= Locks Creek =

Coordinates: 37.516884°N 122.433308°W

Locks Creek is a 1.9-mile-long (3.1 km) stream in San Mateo County, California. It is the largest tributary of Frenchmans Creek, a larger stream.

== See also ==
- List of watercourses in the San Francisco Bay Area
