= Frenchmans Creek (California) =

River in California, United States

Coordinates: 37.480496°N 122.45081°W

Frenchmans Creek is a 4.4-mile-long (7.1 km) stream in San Mateo County, California. Locks Creek is its largest tributary.

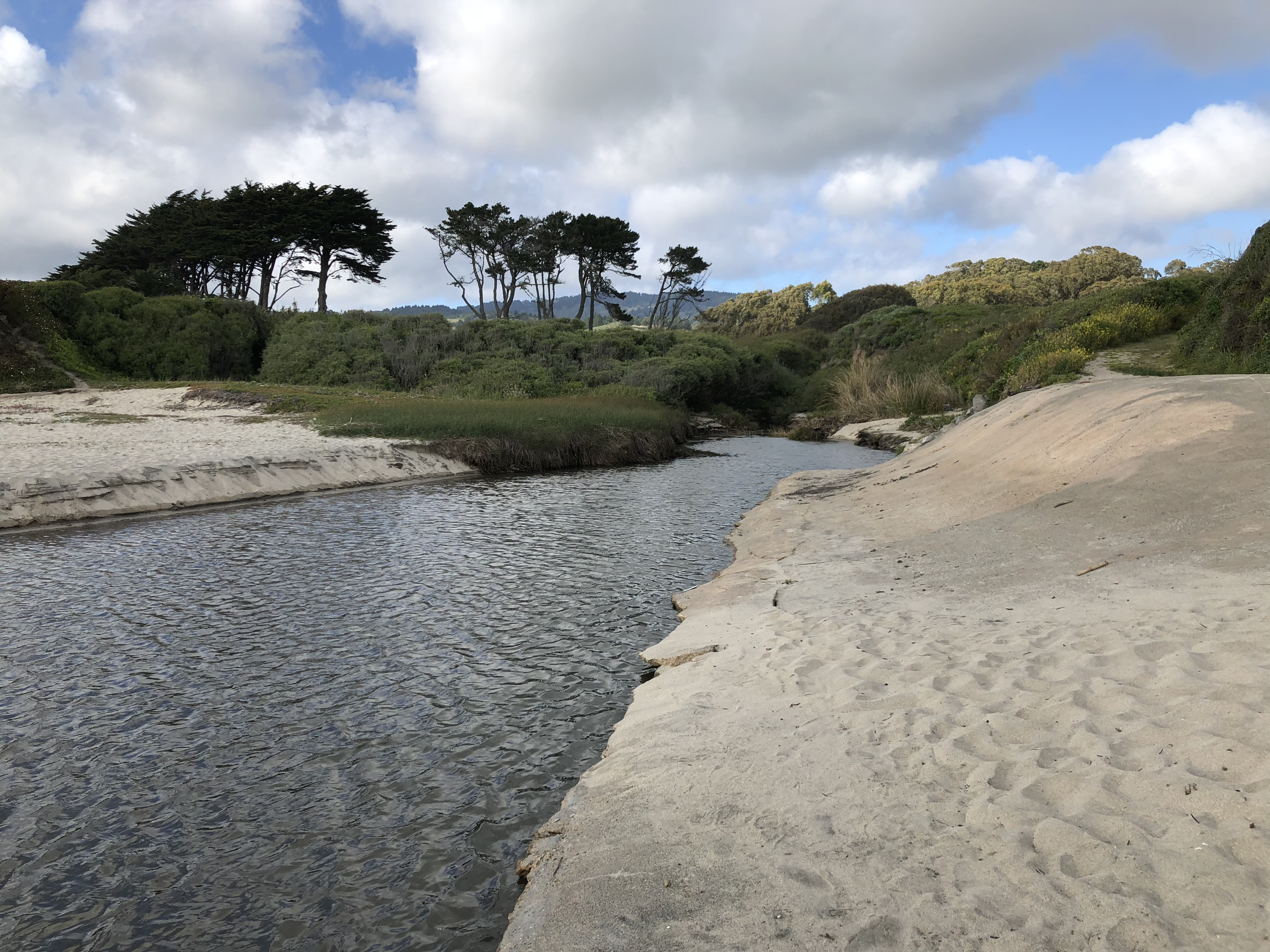
Frenchmans Creek at Half Moon Bay State Beach

== See also ==
- List of watercourses in the San Francisco Bay Area
