= Frenchmans Creek (New South Wales) =

Coordinates: 31°04′S 152°47′E

Location
- Country: Australia

Physical characteristics
- Mouth
  - location: confluence with the Darling River
- Length: 7.51 km (4.67 mi)

Frenchmans Creek is a short tributary of the Darling River in west New South Wales, measuring 7.51 km (5 mi) from its source south of Pooncarie, New South Wales at an elevation of 54.4 m (178 ft) to its confluence into the Darling River at an elevation of 48 metres (157 ft).

== See also ==
- List of rivers of Australia
