= French Creek Presbyterian Church =

Historic church in West Virginia, United States

- U.S. National Register of Historic Places
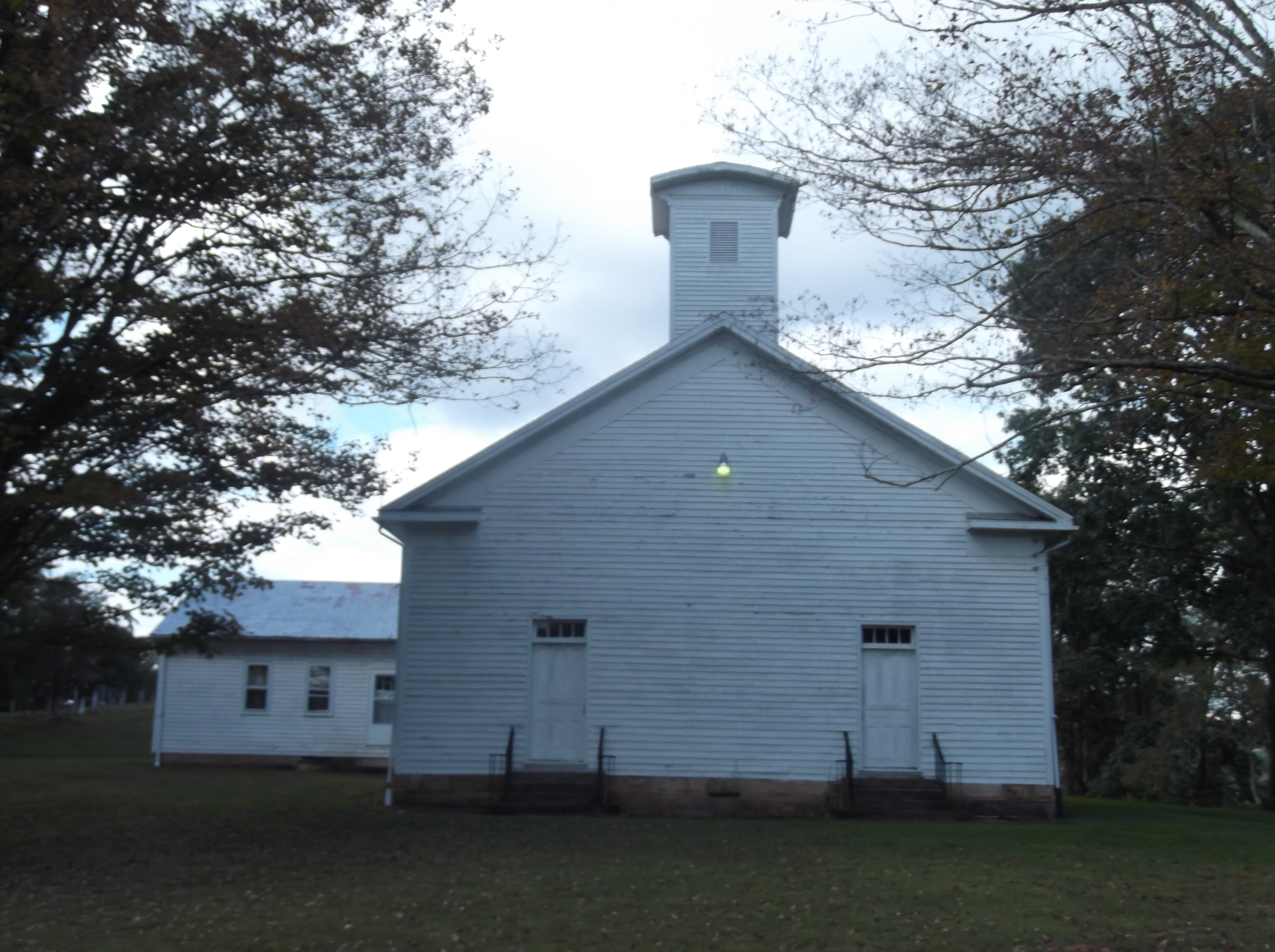

- Location within West Virginia Location within the United States
- Location: Rte. 2, French Creek, West Virginia
- Coordinates: 38°53′6″N 80°18′7″W
- Area: 0.5 acres (0.20 ha)
- Built: 1866
- Architect: Bunten, Lieut. Warson
- NRHP reference No.: 74002020
- Added to NRHP: December 24, 1974

French Creek Presbyterian Church is a historic Presbyterian church located in French Creek, Upshur County, West Virginia. It was built in 1866 by settlers from New England, and is a simple rectangular frame building with a white weatherboard exterior. It measures 50 feet by 40 feet and has a gable roof topped by a belfry.

It was listed on the National Register of Historic Places in 1974.
