= McCullough Creek (Florida) =

Creek in Florida, United States

Coordinates: 27.732806°N 81.824871°W

McCullough Creek is a stream in Polk County, Florida, in the United States.

McCullough Creek was probably either named for a leader in the Seminole Wars or for a pioneer family who lived there.

== See also ==
- List of rivers of Florida
