= McCulloch Creek (British Columbia) =

Coordinates: 51°39′01″N 118°30′08″W

McCullough Creek is a creek located in the Big Bend Country region of British Columbia. The creek is a northern tributary of the Goldstream River. It was discovered in 1864 and mined for gold. The creek has produced over $750,000 in gold.
