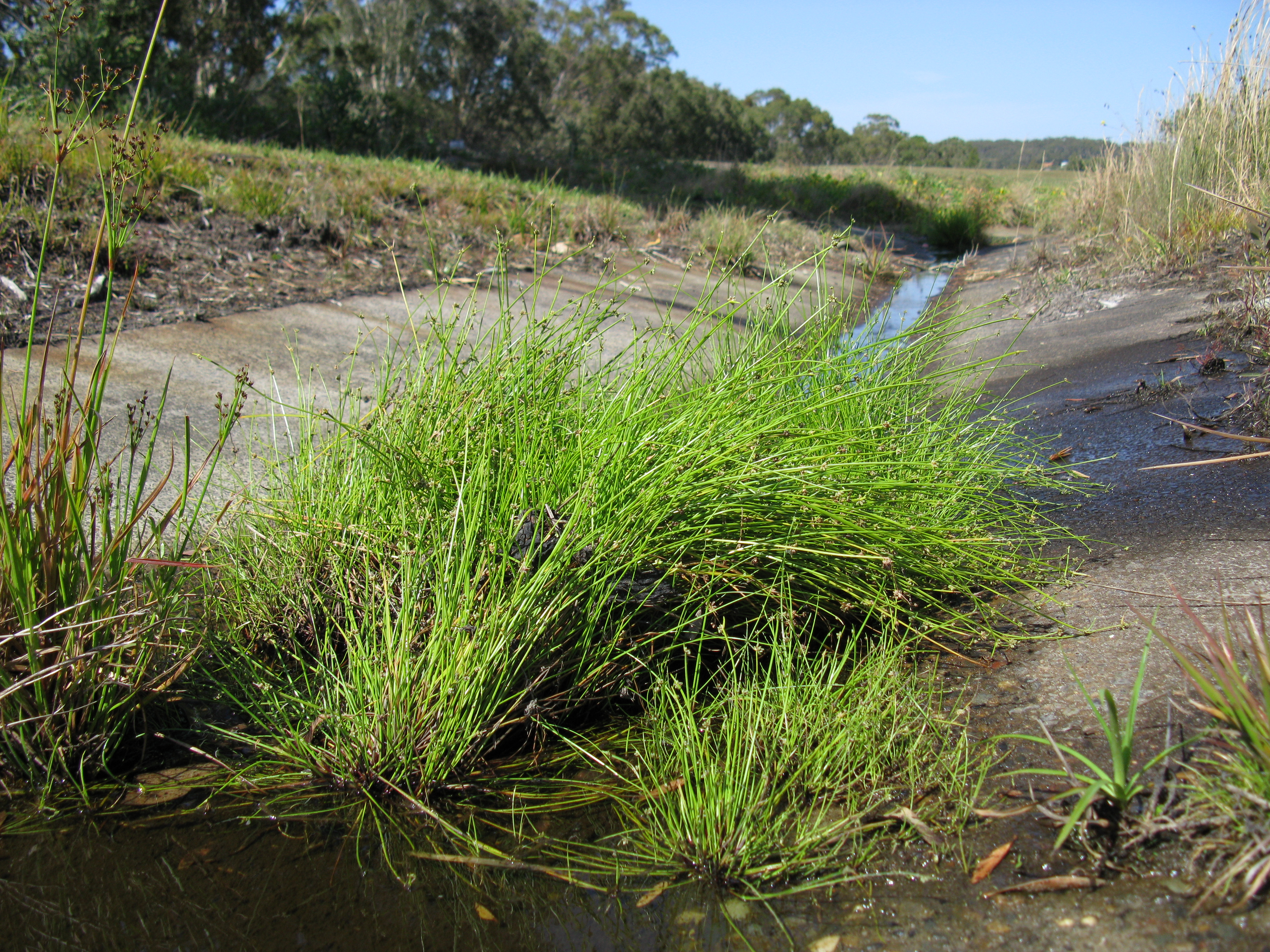

Scientific classification
- Kingdom: Plantae
- Clade: Tracheophytes
- Clade: Angiosperms
- Clade: Monocots
- Clade: Commelinids
- Order: Poales
- Family: Cyperaceae
- Genus: Isolepis
- Species: I. inundata

Binomial name
- Isolepis inundata R.Br.

= Isolepis inundata =

Species of plant

Isolepis inundata is a species of sedge native to Papua New Guinea, Australia and New Zealand. Common names include swamp club-rush. It was first described by prolific botanist Robert Brown in 1810.
