= French Creek (British Columbia) =

Watercourse in British Columbia, Canada

Coordinates: 51°38′58″N 118°28′42″W

French Creek is a creek located in the Big Bend Country region of British Columbia. The creek is a northern tributary of the Goldstream River which flows into the Columbia River from the east, a little over 50 miles north of Revelstoke. This creek has been mined and has produced about $800,000 in gold. French Creek has been mined by Europeans and Chinese. There is evidence that part of French Creek has changed course over the years due to rock slides and other blockages. The empty former creek bed still parallels the present-day creek in some areas.
