= Frenchman Creek (Missouri) =

Stream in the American state of Missouri

Coordinates: 38.0261640°N 90.1109476°W

Frenchman Creek is a stream in Ste. Genevieve County in the U.S. state of Missouri. It is a tributary of the Mississippi River.

A variant name was "Sugar Creek". A large share of the first settlers being of French descent accounts for the present name.

== See also ==
- List of rivers of Missouri
