= French Creek (Lake Itasca) =

Stream in Clearwater County, Minnesota, U.S.

Coordinates: 47°13′37″N 95°12′25″W

French Creek is a stream in Clearwater County, Minnesota, in the United States. It flows into Lake Itasca.

French Creek was named for George H. French, a government surveyor.

== See also ==
- List of rivers of Minnesota
