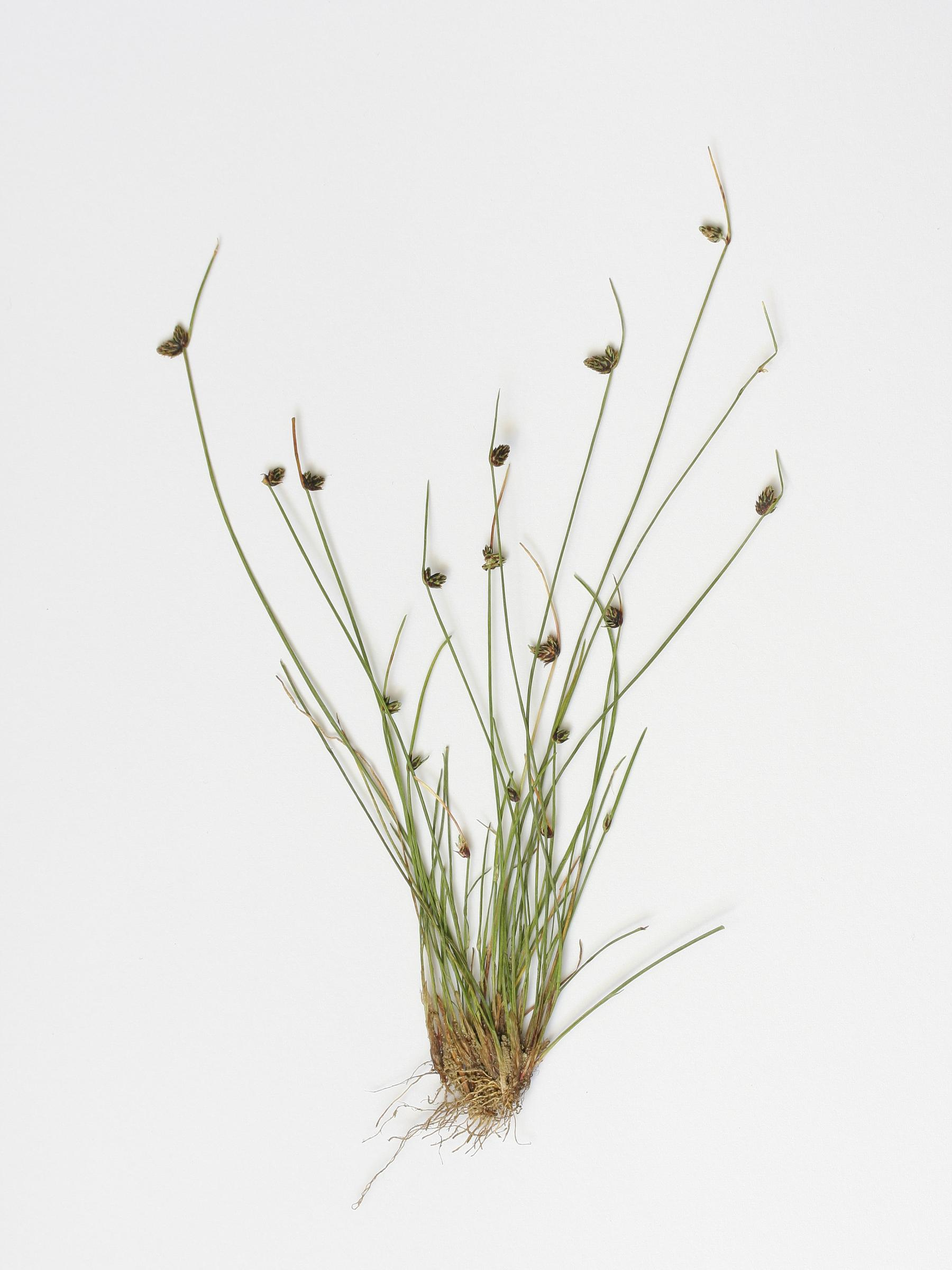

Scientific classification
- Kingdom: Plantae
- Clade: Tracheophytes
- Clade: Angiosperms
- Clade: Monocots
- Clade: Commelinids
- Order: Poales
- Family: Cyperaceae
- Genus: Isolepis
- Species: I. setacea

Binomial name
- Isolepis setacea (L.) R.Br.

Synonyms
- Scirpus setaceus L.

= Isolepis setacea =

Species of grass-like plant

Isolepis setacea (syn. Scirpus setaceus) is a species of flowering plant in the sedge family known by the common names bristle club-rush and bristleleaf bulrush. It is native to Eurasia and Africa, and possibly Australasia. It can be found in other places, including some areas in North America, where it is an introduced species. It grows in many types of moist and wet habitat, often in coastal regions, and sometimes inland. It is a perennial herb which forms mats of very thin, grooved, erect or arching stems up to about 20 centimeters tall. The leaves sheath the stem bases and have short, flat, thick blades. The inflorescence is a solitary spikelet just a few millimeters long, or a cluster of up to three spikelets. These are accompanied by a stiff bract extending past the flowers.
