= Worth Township, Mercer County, Pennsylvania =

Township in Pennsylvania, US

Coordinates: 41°16′0″N 80°2′59″W

- Township
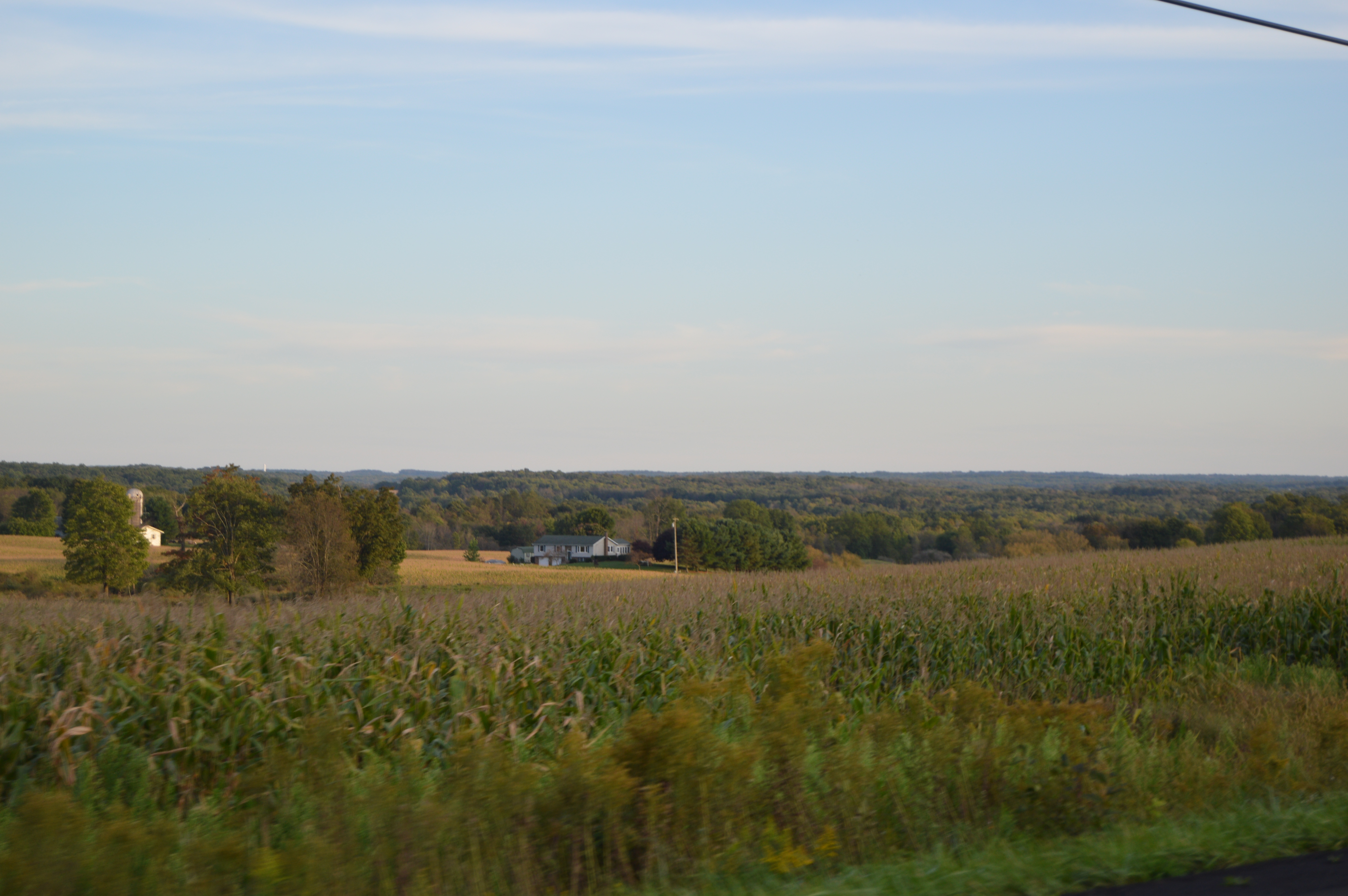
- Farmland northwest of Millbrook

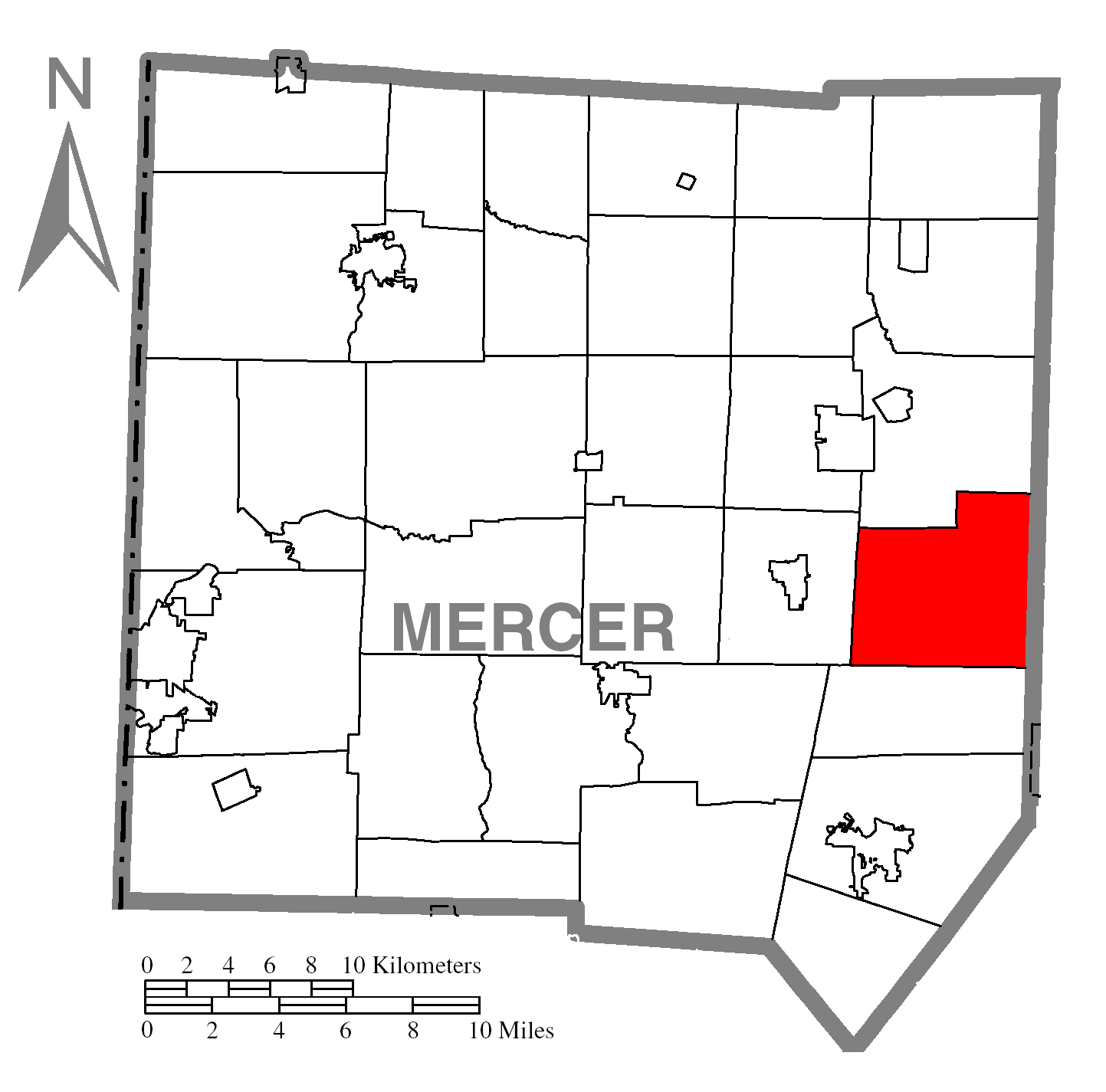
- Location of Worth Township in Mercer County

- Location of Mercer County in Pennsylvania
- Country: United States
- State: Pennsylvania
- County: Mercer County

Area
  - Total: 24.85 sq mi (64.37 km^{2})
  - Land: 24.68 sq mi (63.92 km^{2})
  - Water: 0.17 sq mi (0.45 km^{2})

Population (2020)
  - Total: 825
  - Estimate (2022): 811
  - Density: 36.5/sq mi (14.08/km^{2})
- Time zone: UTC-4 (EST)
  - Summer (DST): UTC-5 (EDT)
- Area codes: 724, 814
- FIPS code: 42-085-86552

Historical population
Census	Pop.	Note	%±
2000	830		—
2010	899		8.3%
2020	824		−8.3%
2022 (est.)	811		−1.6%
U.S. Decennial Census

Worth Township is a township in Mercer County, Pennsylvania, United States. The population was 824 at the 2020 census, a decrease from 899 in 2010.

== Geography ==
According to the United States Census Bureau, the township has a total area of 25.0 square miles (64.8 km^{2}), of which 24.8 square miles (64.2 km^{2}) is land and 0.2 square mile (0.6 km^{2}) (0.96%) is water.

== Demographics ==
As of the census of 2000, there were 830 people, 319 households, and 238 families residing in the township. The population density was 33.5 inhabitants per square mile (12.9/km^{2}). There were 329 housing units at an average density of 13.3/sq mi (5.1/km^{2}). The racial makeup of the township was 99.28% White, 0.12% Asian, 0.24% Pacific Islander, and 0.36% from two or more races. Hispanic or Latino of any race were 0.24% of the population.

There were 319 households, out of which 34.8% had children under the age of 18 living with them, 65.5% were married couples living together, 5.6% had a female householder with no husband present, and 25.1% were non-families. 20.7% of all households were made up of individuals, and 9.7% had someone living alone who was 65 years of age or older. The average household size was 2.60 and the average family size was 3.04.

In the township the population was spread out, with 25.2% under the age of 18, 5.7% from 18 to 24, 29.2% from 25 to 44, 24.1% from 45 to 64, and 15.9% who were 65 years of age or older. The median age was 40 years. For every 100 females there were 100.0 males. For every 100 females age 18 and over, there were 106.3 males.

The median income for a household in the township was $41,328, and the median income for a family was $46,719. Males had a median income of $30,573 versus $21,818 for females. The per capita income for the township was $18,434. About 5.3% of families and 8.4% of the population were below the poverty line, including 13.6% of those under age 18 and 4.2% of those age 65 or over.
