= Frenchcreek Township, Pennsylvania =

Township in Pennsylvania, US

Coordinates: 41°25′00″N 79°57′59″W

Frenchcreek Township, Venango County, Pennsylvania
- Township
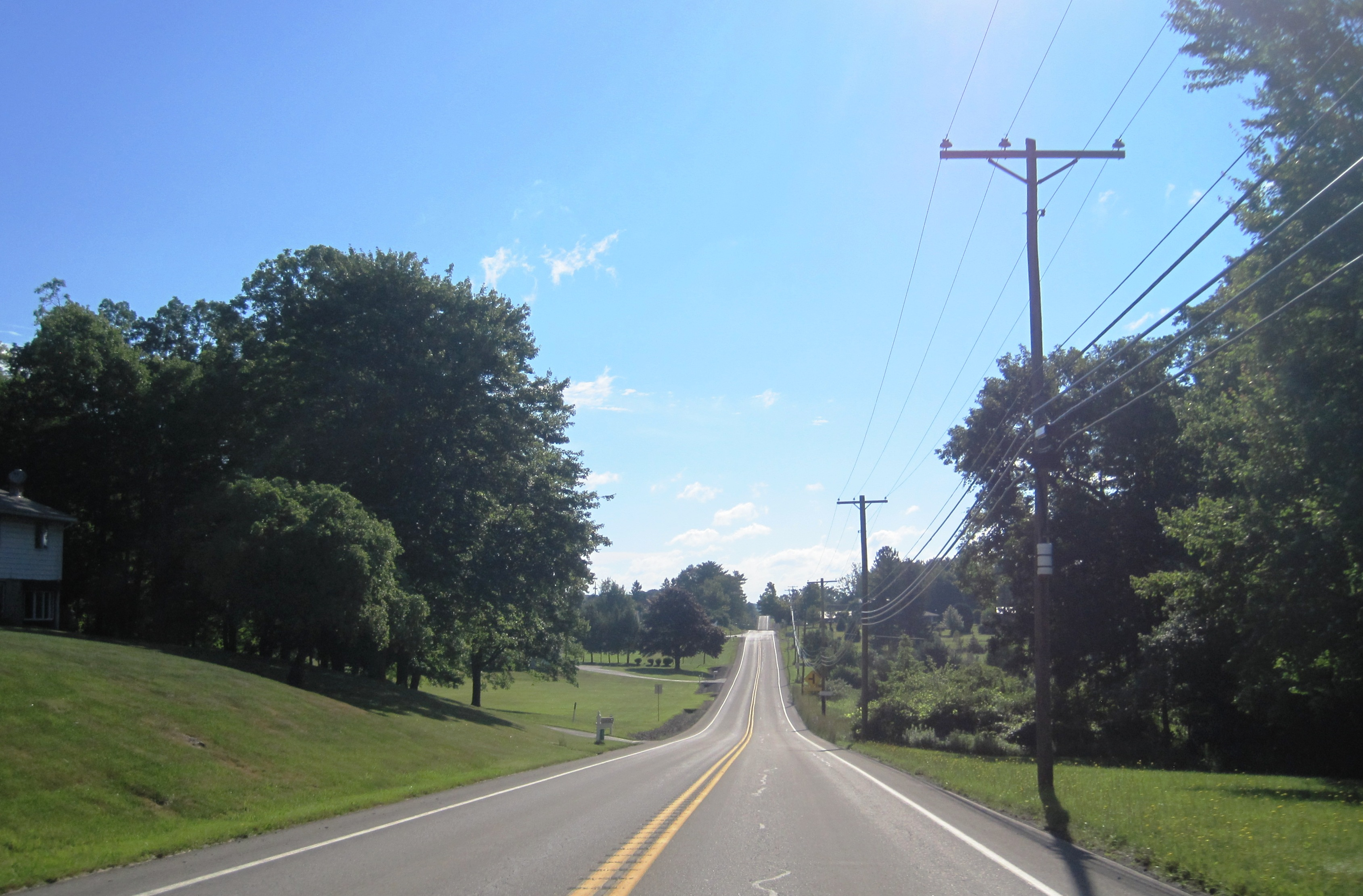
- US 62 northbound in Frenchcreek Township

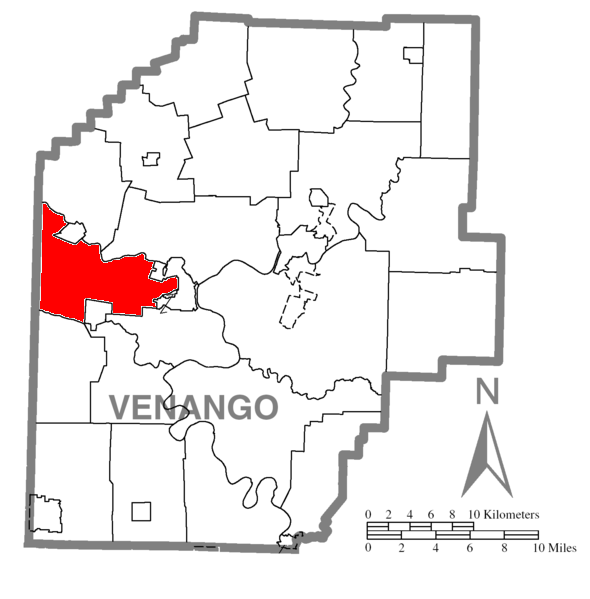
- Map of Venango County, Pennsylvania highlighting Frenchcreek Township

- Map of Venango County, Pennsylvania
- Country: United States
- State: Pennsylvania
- County: Venango
- Settled: 1796
- Incorporated: 1806

Government
  - Type: Board of Supervisors

Area
  - Total: 29.34 sq mi (76.00 km^{2})
  - Land: 29.14 sq mi (75.46 km^{2})
  - Water: 0.21 sq mi (0.54 km^{2})

Population (2020)
  - Total: 1,424 ▼
  - Estimate (2024): 1,389
  - Density: 50.6/sq mi (19.52/km^{2})
- Time zone: UTC-5 (Eastern (EST))
  - Summer (DST): UTC-4 (EDT)
- Area code: 814
- FIPS code: 42-121-27832
- Website: https://frenchcreektwp.org/

Frenchcreek Township is a township in Venango County, Pennsylvania, United States. The population was 1,424 at the 2020 census, a decrease from 1,542 in 2010, which represented, in turn, a decline from the figure of 1,605 as of 2000.

== Geography ==
According to the United States Census Bureau, the township has a total area of 29.5 square miles (76 km^{2}), of which 29.3 square miles (76 km^{2}) is land and 0.2 square miles (0.52 km^{2}) (0.68%) is water.

== Demographics ==
Historical population
Census	Pop.	Note	%±
2000	1,605		—
2010	1,542		−3.9%
2020	1,424		−7.7%
2024 (est.)	1,389		−2.5%
U.S. Decennial Census

As of the census of 2000, there were 1,605 people, 662 households, and 473 families residing in the township. The population density was 54.7 inhabitants per square mile (21.1/km^{2}). There were 788 housing units at an average density of 26.9 per square mile (10.4/km^{2}). The racial makeup of the township was 98.32% White, 0.37% African American, 0.25% Native American, 0.06% Asian, and 1.00% from two or more races. Hispanic or Latino of any race were 0.12% of the population.

There were 662 households, out of which 30.1% had children under the age of 18 living with them, 61.8% were married couples living together, 6.6% had a female householder with no husband present, and 28.4% were non-families. 24.3% of all households were made up of individuals, and 9.1% had someone living alone who was 65 years of age or older. The average household size was 2.42 and the average family size was 2.89.

In the township the population was spread out, with 24.0% under the age of 18, 5.2% from 18 to 24, 27.7% from 25 to 44, 29.8% from 45 to 64, and 13.4% who were 65 years of age or older. The median age was 42 years. For every 100 females, there were 96.0 males. For every 100 females age 18 and over, there were 94.6 males.

The median income for a household in the township was $38,813, and the median income for a family was $46,771. Males had a median income of $35,000 versus $21,852 for females. The per capita income for the township was $17,620. About 5.9% of families and 7.4% of the population were below the poverty line, including 9.1% of those under age 18 and 4.9% of those age 65 or over.
