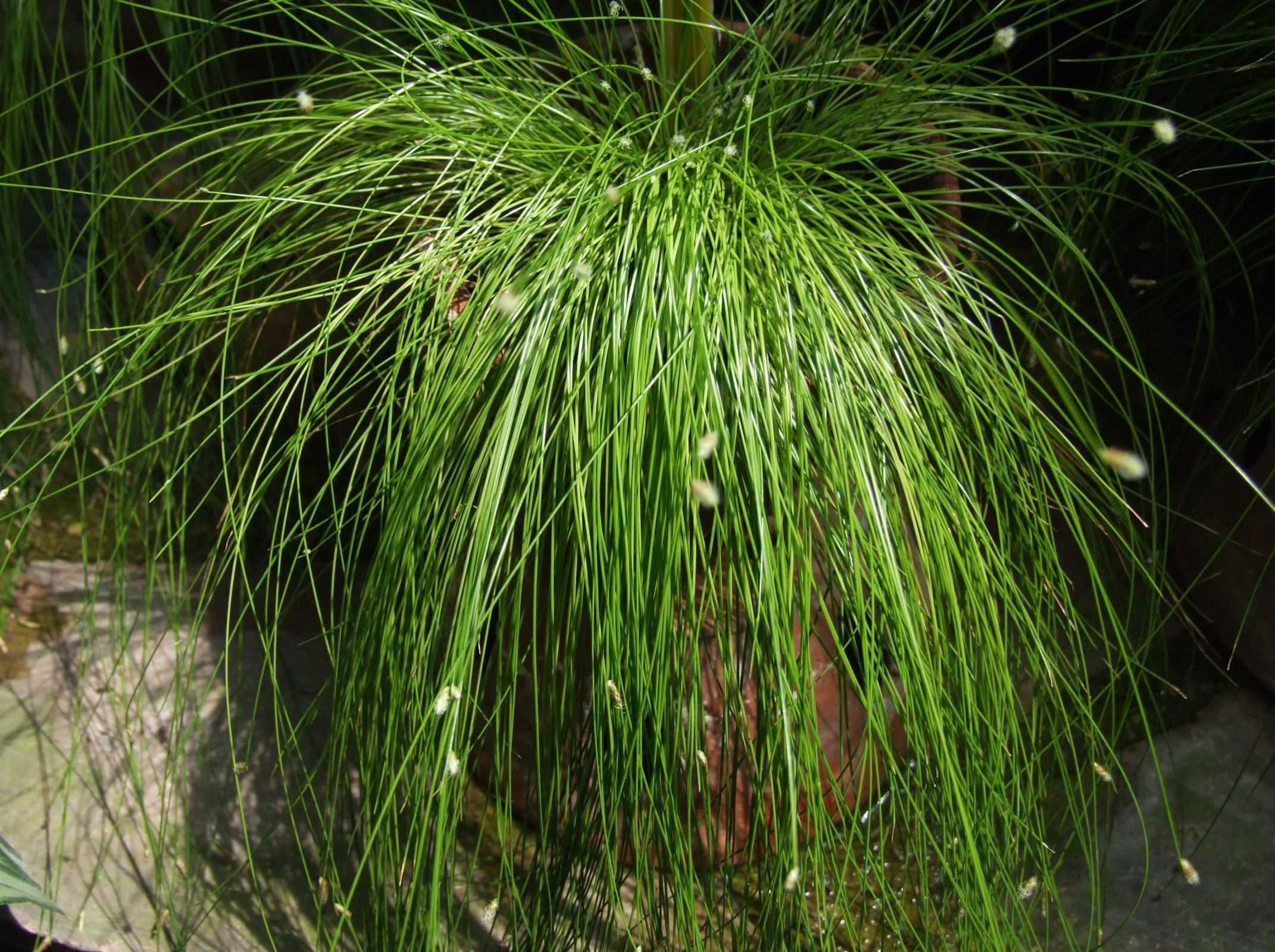

Conservation status
- Least Concern (IUCN 3.1)

Scientific classification
- Kingdom: Plantae
- Clade: Tracheophytes
- Clade: Angiosperms
- Clade: Monocots
- Clade: Commelinids
- Order: Poales
- Family: Cyperaceae
- Genus: Isolepis
- Species: I. cernua

Binomial name
- Isolepis cernua (Vahl) Roem. & Schult.

= Isolepis cernua =

Species of grass-like plant

Isolepis cernua (basionym Scirpus cernuus) is a species of flowering plant in the sedge family known by the common names low bulrush, slender club-rush, tufted clubrush, and fiberoptic grass. It is widespread, being native to many regions of the world, including parts of Australasia, Eurasia, Africa, and North and South America.

I. cernua is a small sedge that can be common in boggy ground and around ponds in both freshwater wetlands and salt marshes, as well as among dune slacks and other brackish environments.
