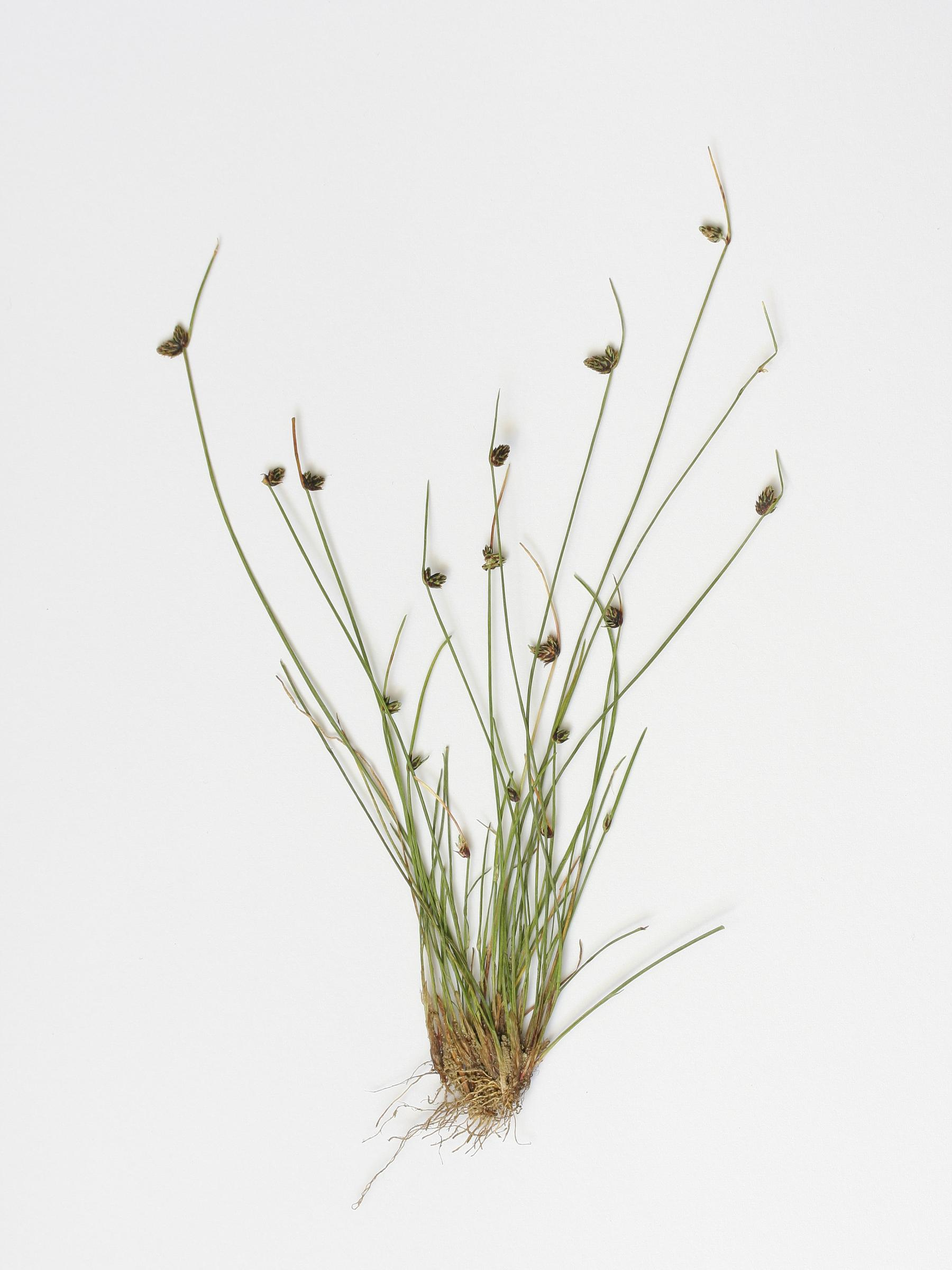
- Isolepis setacea

Scientific classification
- Kingdom: Plantae
- Clade: Tracheophytes
- Clade: Angiosperms
- Clade: Monocots
- Clade: Commelinids
- Order: Poales
- Family: Cyperaceae
- Genus: Isolepis; R.Br.

Type species
- Isolepis setacea L.

Diversity
- c. 70 species

Synonyms
- Eleogiton Link; Scirpidiella Rauschert

= Isolepis =

Genus of grass-like plants

Isolepis is a genus of flowering plants in the sedge family, containing around 70 species. Isolepis is cosmopolitan, and often found in cool tropical and temperate climates in Africa and Australasia.

Isolepis was first described by prolific botanist Robert Brown in 1810. In 1870, the botanist Boeckeler disbanded the genus putting most of the names under a different genus, Scirpus. By the early 20th century Isolepis ceased to exist with other botanists following on from Boeckler's work. It was not until the late 20th century that Isolepis was reinstated as a distinct genus due to embryological research.

== See also ==
- List of Isolepis species
