= Thomsons Lake =

Lake in Perth, Western Australia

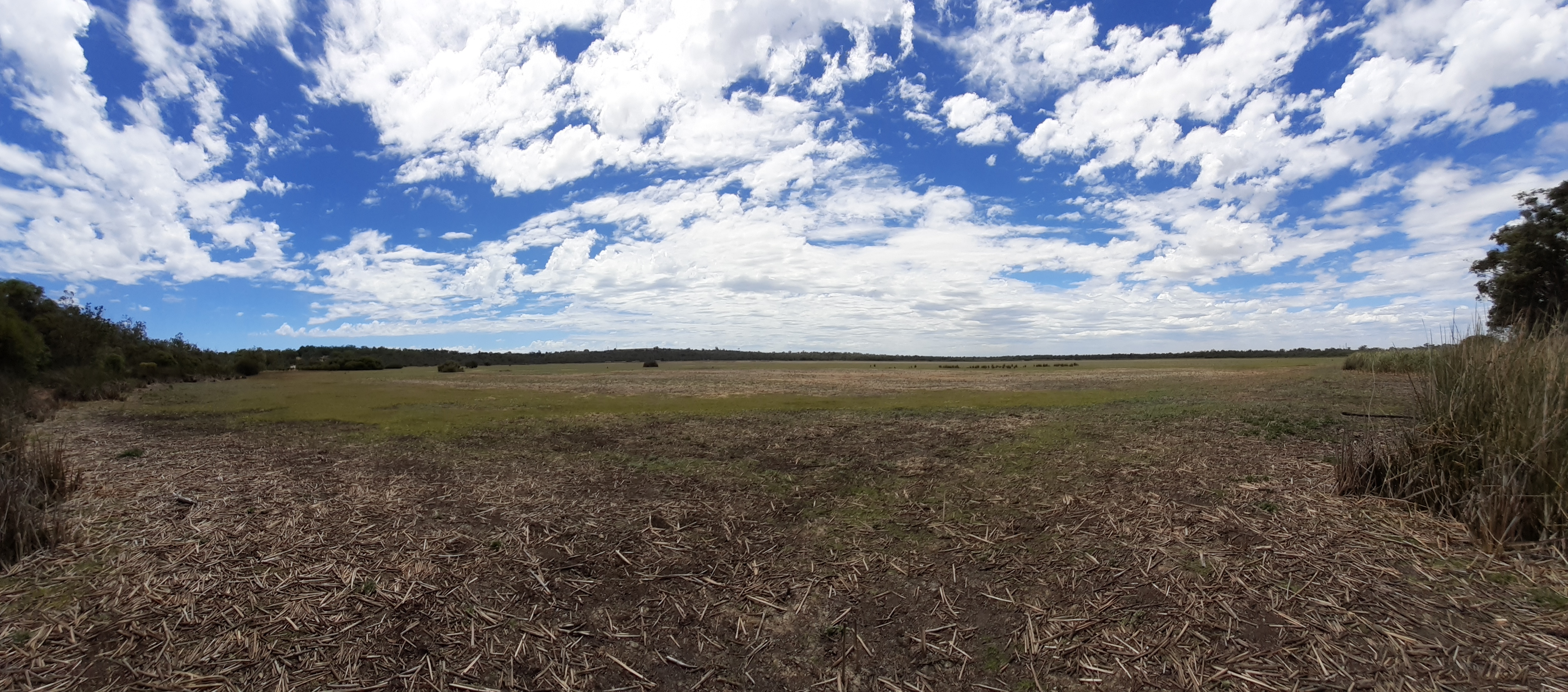
- Thomsons Lake panorama, January 2021

- Location within Perth
- Interactive map of Thomsons Lake
- Location: Perth, Western Australia
- Coordinates: 32°09′00″S 115°49′45″E
- Type: Brackish seasonal groundwater
- Primary outflows: groundwater; evaporation
- Basin countries: Australia
- Designation: Thomsons Lake Nature Reserve; Forrestdale and Thomsons Lakes Ramsar Site
- Max. length: 1.6 km (0.99 mi)
- Max. width: 1.3 km (0.81 mi)
- Surface area: 5.38 km^{2} (2.08 sq mi)
- Surface elevation: 12 m (39 ft)

Thomsons Lake Nature Reserve is a lake nature reserve around Thomsons Lake (Nyungar: Jilbup) in the City of Cockburn, Western Australia, approximately 25 kilometres (16 mi) south of the central business district of Perth, the state capital, and on the southern fringes of the Perth metropolitan area. It is in the suburb of Beeliar, 7 kilometres (4.3 mi) south-west of Jandakot Airport. It is a still largely natural wetland, with adjoining native vegetation, surrounded by land developed for housing and agriculture, that regularly supports large numbers of shorebirds and other waterbirds.

== Protection ==
The lake is listed on the Register of the National Estate. With the similar Forrestdale Lake 10 kilometres (6.2 mi) to the east, it forms the Forrestdale and Thomsons Lakes Ramsar Site, designated under the Ramsar Convention on 7 June 1990 and recognising it as a wetland of international importance. The lake and its surrounds are registered as Nature Reserve 15556, vested in the Conservation Commission of Western Australia and managed by the Department of Conservation and Land Management. The reserve is also part of the Beeliar Regional Park.

== Description ==
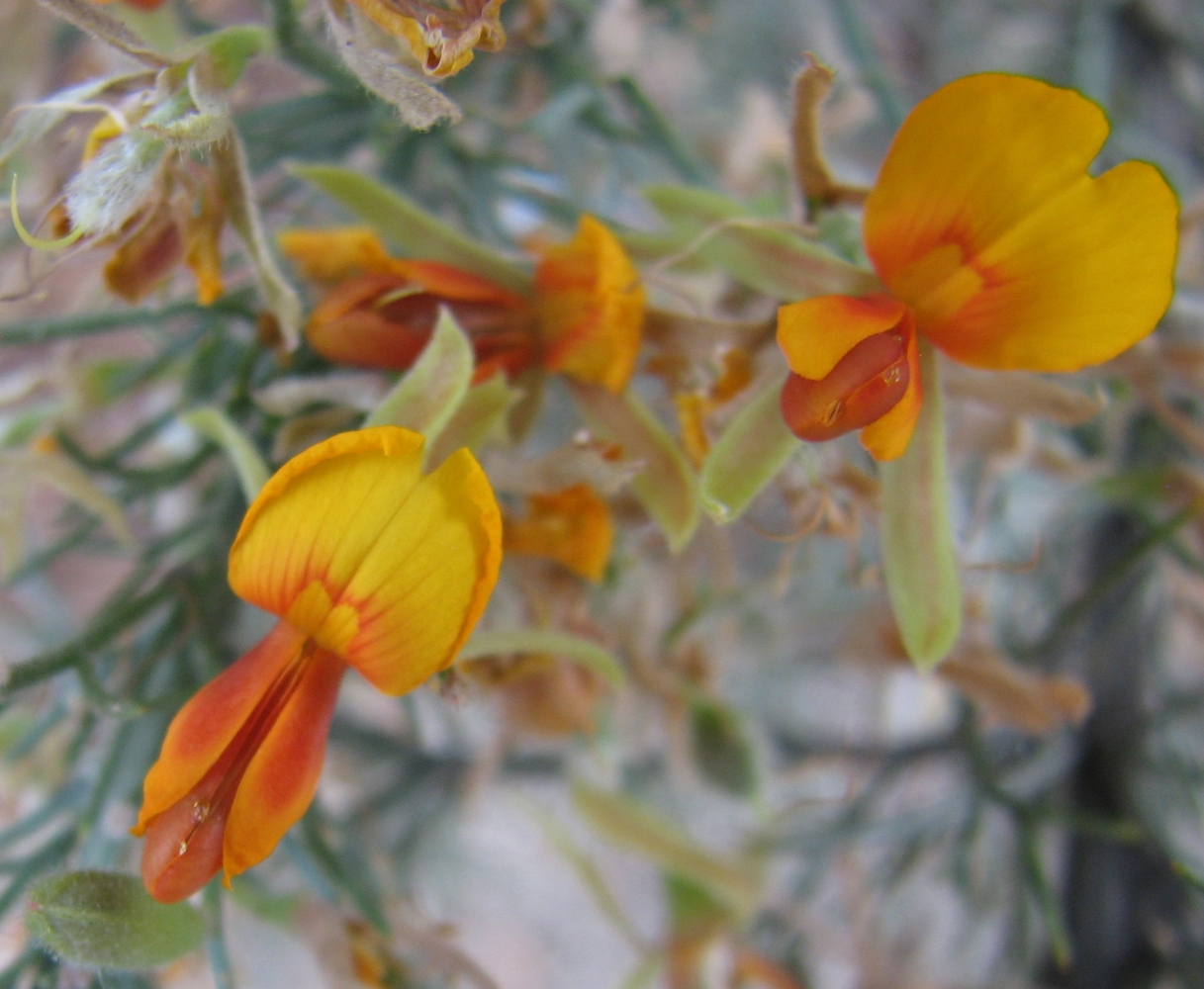
Grey stinkwood

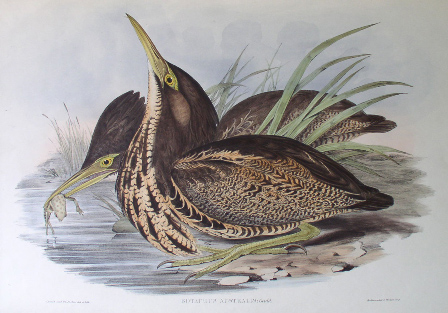
Australasian bittern

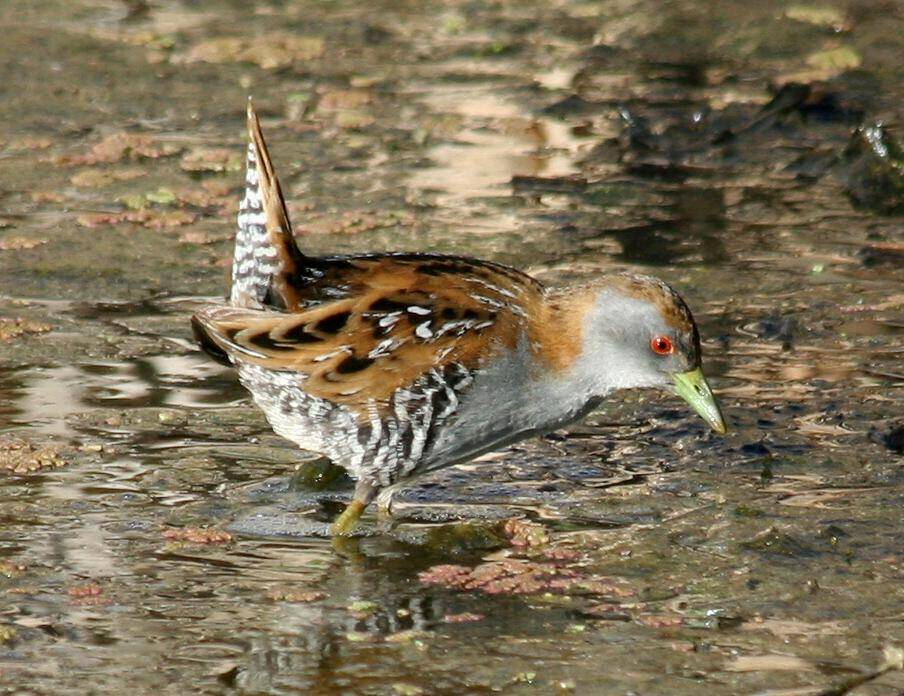
Baillon's crake

Thomsons Lake Nature Reserve, including the lake and adjacent woodland, has an area of 538 hectares (1,330 acres). The lake is a shallow, brackish, seasonal lake with a large area of open water when full. It has extensive fringing sedgeland typical of the Swan Coastal Plain, and is a major breeding site, migration stop-over and semi-permanent drought refuge area for waterbirds. It usually dries out during the summer, though occasionally retaining some water through the year. It is fenced to exclude feral predators. It is mainly used for birdwatching, nature walks, and general recreation by surrounding residents. Within the reserve there is a network of fire-breaks and management access tracks used for bushwalking, while horse riding is only allowed on a perimeter track outside the vermin-proof fence.

=== Geology and hydrology ===
The lake occupies a depression between two dune systems – the Bassendean System to the east, and the younger Spearwood System to the west. These dunes are the result of the accumulation and subsequent distribution of beach sands along successive shorelines from a series of marine incursions combined with the prevailing westerly winds. Palaeobotanical studies show that the lake sediments are 30–40,000 years old, making them the oldest found in Western Australia. The lake lies on the Jandakot Groundwater Mound - a region of elevated groundwater beneath the Swan Coastal Plain.

=== Flora and fauna ===
Water milfoil grows abundantly in the lake. The fringing zone around the edge is characterised by the introduced bulrush Typha orientalis and the sedge Baumea articulata. When water levels drop, the club-rush Bolboschoenus caldwellii becomes established on the exposed mudflats within the fringing zone, while behind it is a belt of Baumea juncea and Baumea articulata with emergent native broom and shrubs of orange wattle. Behind these is a belt of the trees flooded gum and stout paperbark, and the shrub grey stinkwood. On higher ground these are replaced by open forest or woodland dominated by jarrah, firewood banksia and candlestick banksia. Some 476 vascular plants (including 133 introduced weeds) from 81 families have been recorded in the reserve.

The lake is one of the last refuges for the endangered Australasian bittern on the Swan Coastal Plain; it is the only wetland in the Perth metropolitan area where the marsh harrier still breeds, and one of few known breeding sites for Baillon's crake. It regularly supports more than 1% of the national population of four shorebirds: red-capped plover (with up to 1,000 counted), black-winged stilt (3,000), red-necked avocet (3,000), and curlew sandpiper (2,500). The lake often holds more than 10,000 waterbirds, with the highest number counted over 20,000. The most numerous are Australian shelduck (with up to 1,600 counted), Pacific black duck (4,500), grey teal (6,000), Australasian shoveler (2,000), and Eurasian coot (7,000). The reserve contains a population of western grey kangaroos. The long-necked tortoise is present. Six frog species and up to 80 aquatic invertebrate taxa have been recorded.

== See also ==
- List of lakes of Australia § Western Australia
