= Forrestdale Lake =

Lake south of Perth, Western Australia

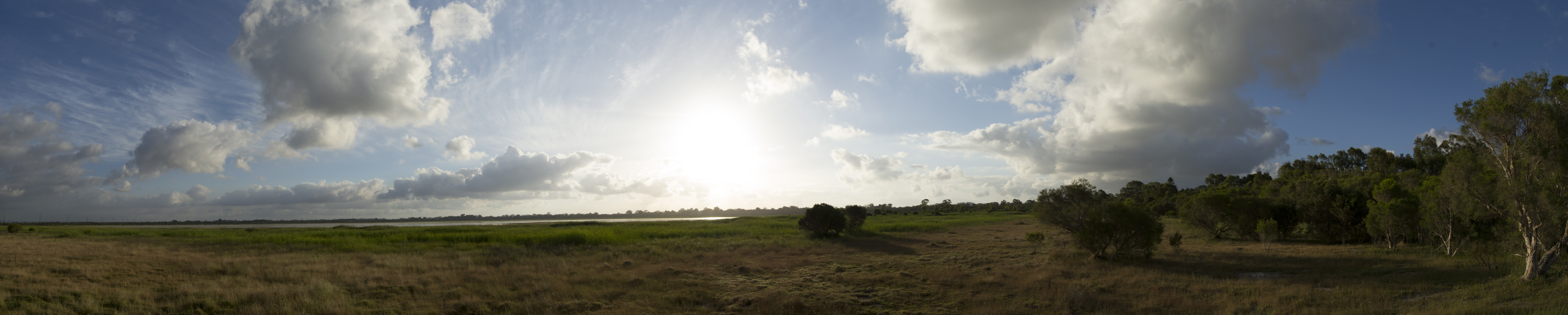

- Location within Perth
- Interactive map of Forrestdale Lake
- Location: Perth, Western Australia
- Coordinates: 32°09′30″S 115°56′16″E
- Type: Brackish seasonal groundwater
- Primary outflows: groundwater; evaporation
- Basin countries: Australia
- Designation: Forrestdale Lake Nature Reserve; Forrestdale and Thomsons Lakes Ramsar Site
- Max. length: 1.6 km (0.99 mi)
- Max. width: 1.3 km (0.81 mi)
- Surface area: 2.45 km^{2} (0.95 sq mi)
- Surface elevation: 22 m (72 ft)

Forrestdale Lake Nature Reserve is a lake nature reserve around Forrestdale Lake in the City of Armadale, Western Australia, approximately 25 kilometres (16 mi) south of the central business district of Perth, the state capital, and on the southern fringes of the Perth metropolitan area. It lies immediately south of the suburb of Forrestdale, and 8 kilometres (5.0 mi) south-east of Jandakot Airport. It is a still largely natural wetland, with some adjoining native vegetation, surrounded by land developed for housing and agriculture, that regularly supports large numbers of shorebirds and other waterbirds.

== History and recognition ==
=== Traditional usage ===
Before European settlement the lake was used by Aboriginal people as an important site for turtle hunting, with campsites occupied for long periods. It is associated with the Waugal, a powerful and important water serpent in Noongar mythology that created rivers and lakes, and maintains the flow of waters to its resting places.

=== European settlement ===
The first non-Aboriginal settlement occurred in 1885, when William and Alfred Skeet were granted a "Special Occupation" license for 40 hectares (100 acres) adjoining the lake, as well as licences to cut and sell timber. Farming around the lake began in 1893; much of the land was cleared, crops were trialled along with dairy and poultry farming. By 1898, the area around the lake had been set aside for a township with recommendations made for its subdivision. The Jandakot region started producing vegetables, apiary products and dairy produce for the Fremantle markets.

From the 1920s agriculture gave way to sheep and cattle grazing, which continued through the next 50 years. During the 1940s the west side of the lake was heavily grazed by livestock, particularly during the drier summers, when the lake's fringing vegetation served as supplementary fodder. As a result, the land on the west side of the lake lacks native understorey plants and is infested with introduced plants such as arum lilies.

The lake was gazetted as an A-class Nature Reserve in 1957 for the protection of flora and fauna, as well as for recreation, particularly sailing. The population in the Forrestdale area increased rapidly in the late 1960s as the townsite blocks to the north-west of the lake were taken up. Since then the population has gradually increased to about 1350.

=== Protection ===
Originally Lake Jandakot, it was renamed Forrestdale in 1973. It was listed on the Commonwealth Register of the National Estate in March 1978. With the similar Thomsons Lake 10 kilometres (6.2 mi) to the west, it forms the Forrestdale and Thomsons Lakes Ramsar Site, designated under the Ramsar Convention on 7 June 1990 and recognising it as a wetland of international importance. In 1998 the purpose of the reserve was changed to simply "Conservation of Flora and Fauna". It is registered as Nature Reserve 24781, vested in the Conservation Commission of Western Australia and managed by the Department of Conservation and Land Management. It is mainly used for birdwatching, nature walks, horse riding and general recreation by surrounding residents.

== Description ==
Forrestdale Lake is a shallow, brackish, seasonal lake with a large area 220 to 245 hectares (540 to 610 acres) of open water when full. It has extensive fringing sedgeland typical of the Swan Coastal Plain, and is a major breeding site, migration stop-over and semi-permanent drought refuge area for waterbirds. It usually dries out by mid-summer. The area to the north-east is suburban with houses only 50 metres (160 ft) from the lake. Land to the west has been developed for agriculture or housing to about 100 metres (330 ft) from the shoreline. There is a large area of natural open woodland on the eastern side.

=== Geology and hydrology ===
The lake lies on the eastern edge of the gently undulating Bassendean Dune System, which is formed mainly of leached grey-white siliceous sands. It is a deflation basin bordered by low sand ridges up to 5 metres (16 ft) high. On the north-eastern edge of the lake there is a rocky sandstone outcrop. The lake bed sediments are up to 2 metres (6 ft 7 in) thick and include clay, silt, peat, diatomite, marl and freshwater limestone.

It also lies on the eastern margin of the Jandakot Mound, a region of elevated water table beneath the Swan Coastal Plain, where the mound intersects the Perth Groundwater Area. Water levels in the lake were much higher in the 1970s and 80s, and have been declining steadily since 1992. Groundwater levels have also decreased since records began in 1996 and are about 1.5 to 2.5 metres (4 ft 11 in to 8 ft 2 in) below the levels of the 1970s and 1980s. The lake is now drying out earlier than in previous wetter years.

=== Flora and fauna ===
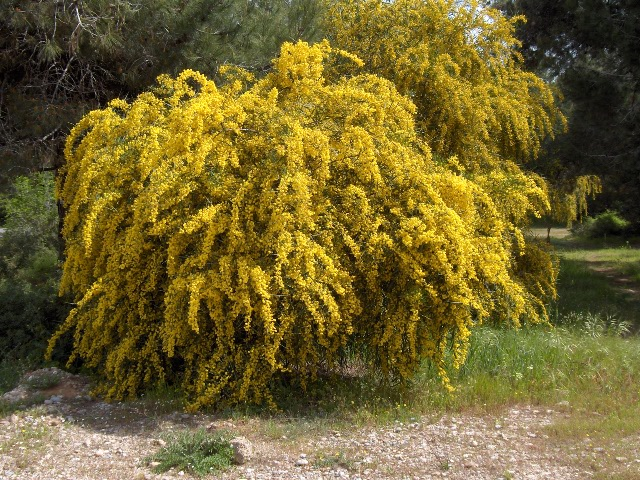
Orange wattle Acacia saligna

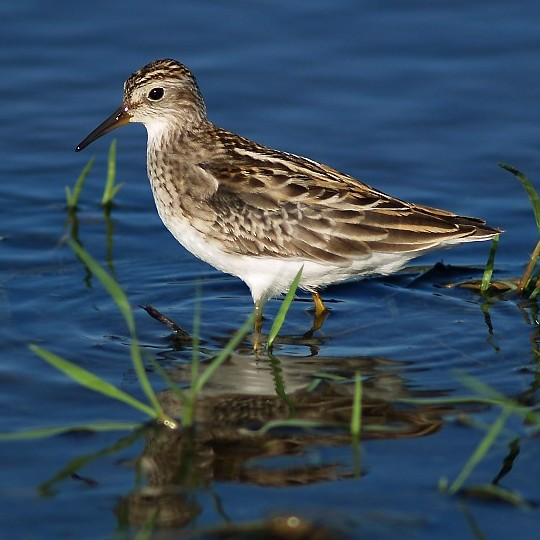
Long-toed stint

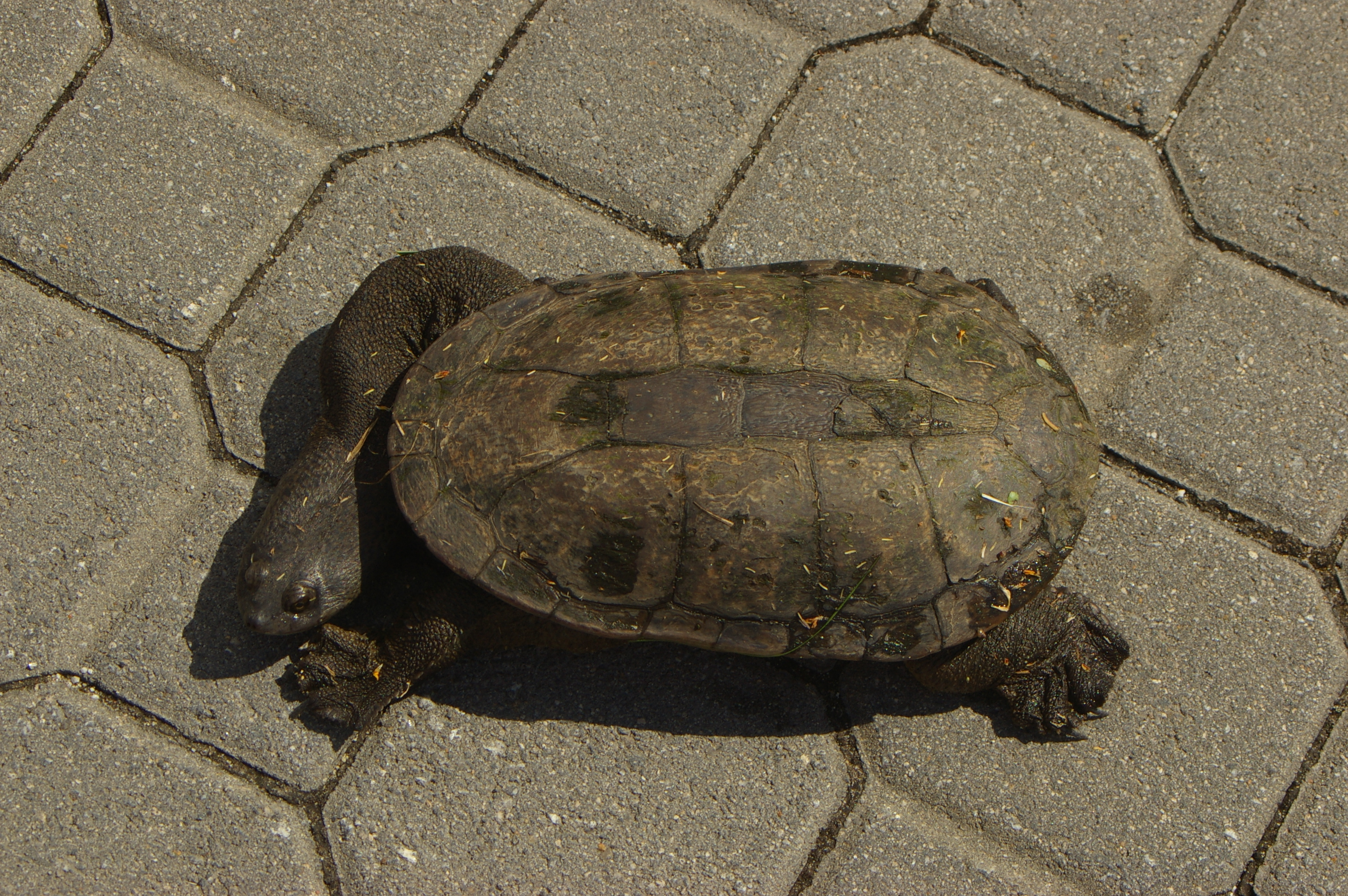
South-western snake-necked turtle

There is often a dense mat of fennel pondweed, stoneworts, and ditch grasses in the water of the lake. Surrounding the open water is an almost continuous belt of the introduced bulrush Typha orientalis, behind which various sedges, rushes and reeds grow. Beyond these is a belt of trees, mainly paperbarks and swamp banksia backed by orange wattle and flooded gum. The higher sandy ground on the eastern side supports open woodland dominated by candlestick banksia. Some 351 vascular plants from 77 families have been recorded from the nature reserve, of which 99 are introduced weeds. Twenty-six species of algae have also been recorded.

More than 20,000 waterbirds have been recorded on Forrestdale Lake. It regularly supports more than 1% of the national population of five shorebirds: red-capped plover (with up to 1,300 recorded at any one time), black-winged stilt (3,840), red-necked avocet (1,113), long-toed stint (up to 80), and curlew sandpiper (2,000). In some years it supports more than 10,000 ducks, including Australian shelduck (up to 1,650 counted), Pacific black duck (5,500), grey teal (9,000), Australasian shoveler (2,000), and hardhead (1,053). The lake is one of the few sites in Western Australia where little ringed plover and little stint have been recorded more than once, and it is the only location in the state where white-rumped sandpiper has been recorded.

As well as the uncommon skink Lerista lineata, Forrestdale Lake supports six frog species and at least 62 aquatic invertebrate taxa. The oblong turtle is present. The critically endangered Australian native bee, Neopasiphae simplicior, is thought to occur only as a single population within the bushland of the Forrestdale Lake Nature Reserve adjacent to the lake and the Armadale Golf Course.

== Conservation ==
=== Threats ===
The use of pesticides to control chironomids (non-biting midges) is a potential threat to aquatic invertebrate and bird life; in 1984 about 220 shorebirds were killed at the lake as a result of such spraying. Increased groundwater abstraction may exacerbate already declining water levels. The area of bulrushes in the fringing vegetation has increased and threatens its ecological character by changing its floristics, reducing the amount of open water, and reducing the area of mudflat available to migratory shorebirds. Disturbance of waterbirds by humans and dogs may occur, especially in late summer and autumn when the lake is drying out. Increasing urbanisation of the catchment may change the water balance or increase the already high nutrient level.

== See also ==
- List of lakes of Australia § Western Australia
