= Forrestdale and Thomsons Lakes Ramsar Site =

Two nature reserves in Perth, Western Australia

- Interactive map of Forrestdale and Thomsons Lakes Ramsar Site
- Location: Perth, Western Australia
- Coordinates: 32°09′S 115°49′E

Ramsar Wetland
- Official name: Forrestdale and Thomsons Lakes
- Designated: 7 June 1990
- Reference no.: 481

The Forrestdale and Thomsons Lakes Ramsar Site comprises two separate nature reserves, totalling 754 ha (1,860 acres) in area, protecting two shallow fresh to brackish, seasonal lakes in a suburban and agricultural landscape in south-western Western Australia. It lies in the Swan Coastal Plain bioregion and is used mainly for birdwatching and walking. The site is recognised as being of international importance under the Ramsar Convention on Wetlands, under which it was designated Ramsar Site 481 on 7 June 1990.

== Description ==
Forrestdale Lake and Thomsons Lake lie 10 km (6.2 mi) apart within the southern Perth metropolitan area. They are similar in size and shape, being oval, about 1.6 km (0.99 mi) long by 1.3 km (0.81 mi) wide, with large central areas of open water when full and with shorelines vegetated with concentric fringes of the introduced bulrush Typha orientalis, sedges, paperbarks and other plants tolerant of seasonal waterlogging. Both lakes usually dry out in summer, though Thomsons lake may occasionally retain water throughout the year. Both reserves contain areas of native woodland. They are the best remaining examples of brackish, seasonal lakes with extensive fringing sedgeland typical of the Swan Coastal Plain. Regionally they form a major breeding, migration stop-over and semi-permanent drought refuge area for shorebirds and other waterbirds.

Ramsar criteria satisfied by the site are that it:

- contains a representative, rare, or unique example of a natural or near-natural wetland type found within the appropriate biogeographic region;
- supports populations of a plant and/or animal species important for maintaining the biological diversity of a particular biogeographic region;
- regularly supports 20,000 or more waterbirds; and
- regularly supports 1% of the individuals in a population of one species or subspecies of waterbird.

== Conservation ==
Conservation management of the site focuses on:

- maintenance of water quality since nutrient levels in the lakes are fairly high, and water levels may be affected by groundwater extraction for domestic and agricultural purposes, or increased drainage discharge from nearby urban areas;
- preventing the spread of Typha orientalis throughout the lakes;
- the need to control chironomid numbers because of their nuisance factor to nearby residents; and
- mitigating further deterioration of wetland and woodland vegetation resulting from over-use by visitors.
