= Scirpus glaucus =

Scirpus glaucus can refer to the following plant species:

- Scirpus glaucus Lam., a synonym of Bolboschoenus glaucus (Lam.) S.G.Sm.
- Scirpus glaucus Torr., a synonym of Eleocharis erythropoda Steud.
- Scirpus glaucus Nees & Meyen ex Kunth, a synonym of Rhodoscirpus asper (J.Presl & C.Presl) Lév.-Bourret, Donadío & J.R.Starr var. asper
- Scirpus glaucus Sm., a synonym of Schoenoplectus tabernaemontani (C.C.Gmel.) Palla
