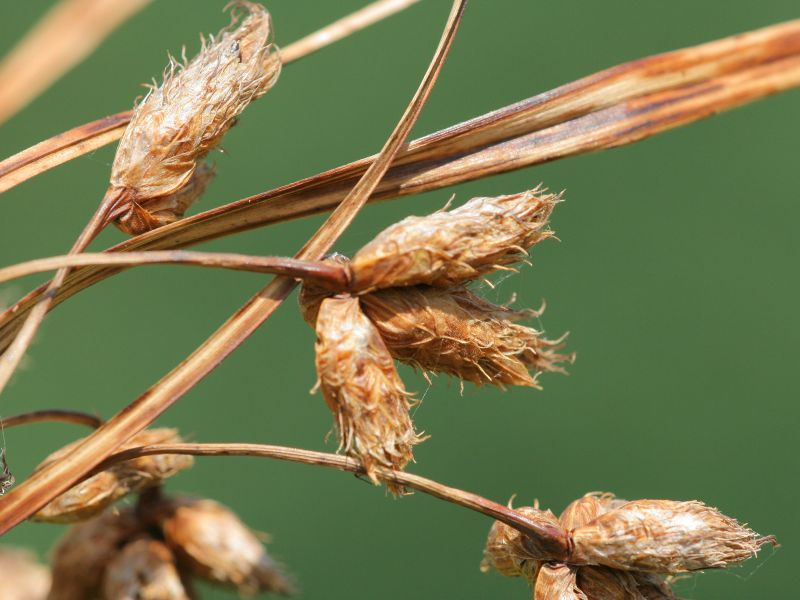

Scientific classification
- Kingdom: Plantae
- Clade: Tracheophytes
- Clade: Angiosperms
- Clade: Monocots
- Clade: Commelinids
- Order: Poales
- Family: Cyperaceae
- Genus: Bolboschoenus
- Species: B. yagara

Binomial name
- Bolboschoenus yagara (Ohwi) Y.C.Yang & M.Zhan

Synonyms
- Scirpus yagara Ohwi

= Bolboschoenus yagara =

Species of flowering plant in the sedge family

Bolboschoenus yagara is a species of flowering plant in the sedge family Cyperaceae. It is a perennial clonal herb, 0.8 to 1.3 meters (2 ft 7 in to 4 ft 3 in) tall, and develops underground rhizomes that terminate in spherical or ellipsoid tubers that are up to 3–4 centimeters (1.2–1.6 in) in diameter. It is able to propagate asexually through the tubers, as well as sexually by seeds.

== Classification ==
Bolboschoenus yagara is predominantly found in China and East Asia, with a fossilized specimen dated from the Late Pliocene period discovered in Shanxi, China. Populations that were previously believed to be Bolboschoenus maritimus have been identified in Central Europe since 1996, with additional populations reported in Poland in 2006. The classification of Bolboschoenus yagara as a distinct species from Bolboschoenus maritimus was based on the morphology of the inflorescence, glumes, spikelets, and achenes. Bolboschoenus yagara has compound, or, rarely, head-like inflorescence with three to eight branches with two or three spikelets each. It has trifid styles, rufescent glumes, strong perianth branches that remain attached to mature achenes, and the achenes are nearly equilaterally trigonous. Bolboschoenus maritimus's inflorescences are head-like and have one to two branches. While its glumes are similar in color to Bolboschoenus yagara, almost all individuals of Bolboschoenus maritimus have bifid styles and digynous achenes.

It is possible that species that could not be clearly identified as either Bolboschoenus yagara or Bolboschoenus maritimus was in fact a B. yagara x B. maritimus hybrid.

== Habitat ==
Bolboschoenus yagara is found in wetlands, swamps, and other wet habitats. Unlike B. maritimus, Bolboschoenus yagara is a glycophyte. In experiments comparing the species to three other Bolboschoenus species (Bolboschoenus maritimus, Bolboschoenus laticarpus, and Bolboschoenus planiculmis), Bolboschoenus yagara was found to be the most sensitive to changes in nutrient supply and salt concentration, where increased concentrations caused a decrease in biomass, shoot number, fertility. In the dormant tuber stage, it is able to survive long-term high water levels. Bolboschoenus yagara is able to survive in both mesotrophic and eutrophic conditions.

It is found in littoral habitats on mineral-poor grounds; in Europe its populations are concentrated in several pond basins in Central Europe, with limited frequency in other regions. As a result of this limited range, it is at risk in Europe because of intensive fish pond management. The range of Bolboschoenus yagara overlaps with that of Bolboschoenus planiculmis.

Like Bolboschoenus planiculmis, Bolboschoenus yagara is an important part of the migratory habitat for the Siberian crane. In the Momoge National Nature Reserve in Jilin, an important stopover area for long-term refueling, along the East Asian–Australasian Flyway, Bolboschoenus yagara and other species of Bolboschoenus, in tandem with Phragmites communis, was the preferred plant community type for the cranes.

== Uses ==
Bolboschoenus yagara tubers, known as jing sanleng (Mandarin: 荊三稜), are used in traditional Chinese medicine to treat a number of ailments such as hyperemesis gravidarum, amenorrhea, and inflammatory-related conditions. Previous studies have identified a number of metabolites from the tubers of Bolboschoenus yagara that are theorized to have anti-inflammatory, anti-oxidant, and other properties, although these claims are speculative and their effectiveness has not been demonstrated in humans.
