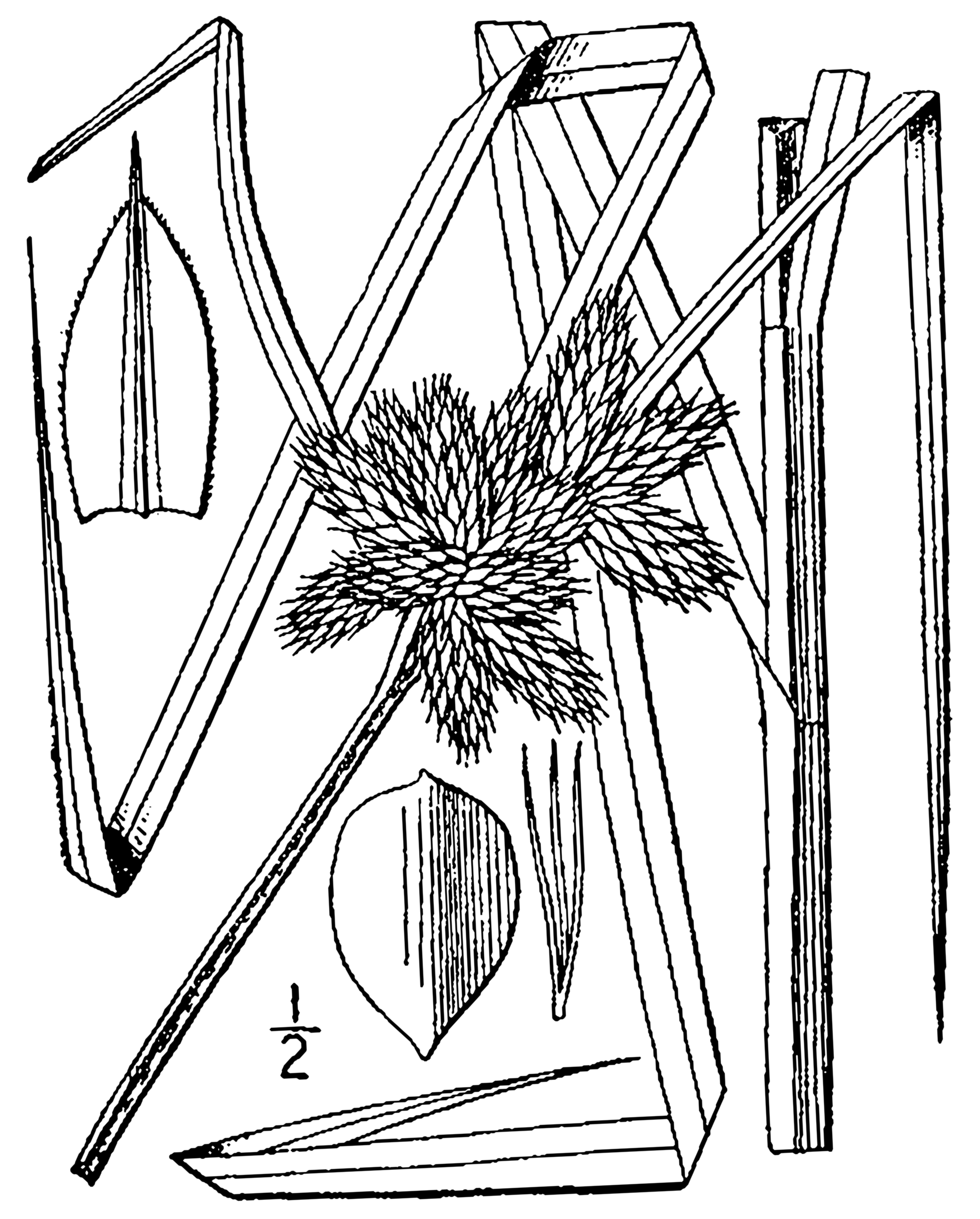
- Bolboschoeunus robustus

Scientific classification
- Kingdom: Plantae
- Clade: Tracheophytes
- Clade: Angiosperms
- Clade: Monocots
- Clade: Commelinids
- Order: Poales
- Family: Cyperaceae
- Genus: Bolboschoenus
- Species: B. robustus

Binomial name
- Bolboschoenus robustus (Pursh) Soják

Synonyms
- Schoenoplectus robustus (Pursh) M.T.Strong; Scirpus robustus Pursh (basionym); Scirpus maritimus var. macrostachyus Michx. ^{List sources :}

= Bolboschoenus robustus =

Saltmarsh bulrush

Species of flowering plant in the sedge family

Bolboschoenus robustus is a species of flowering plant in the sedge family. It is known by many common names: saltmarsh bulrush, alkali bulrush, sturdy bulrush, seacoast bulrush, stout bulrush, three-cornered sedge or leafy three-cornered sedge, and seaside club-rush.

== Distribution ==
B. robustus is native to North America, where it can be found along the eastern and southern coasts from Nova Scotia south to Florida and along the Gulf coastline to Tabasco. It is also known in California, Bermuda, the Bahamas and northern South America. It is most often a coastal species, occurring in wet habitat such as marshes in brackish and saltwater.

== Description ==
It is a perennial herb growing from a rhizome system with associated tubers. The erect stems are three-angled, the angles rough with short hairs. They reach well over a meter in maximum height. The leaves sheath the stem and have long, flat or v-shaped blades. The inflorescence bears one or more clusters of many spikelets as well as long, leaflike bracts.

It often occurs alongside, resembles, and hybridizes with its close relative Bolboschoenus maritimus.

This plant is an important food source for waterfowl on the Gulf Coast of the United States. The seeds are food for birds and other animals, such as muskrats. Native American tribes such as the Pomo and the Kawaiisu have traditionally used the plants for basketry, and some peoples eat the tubers as well.
