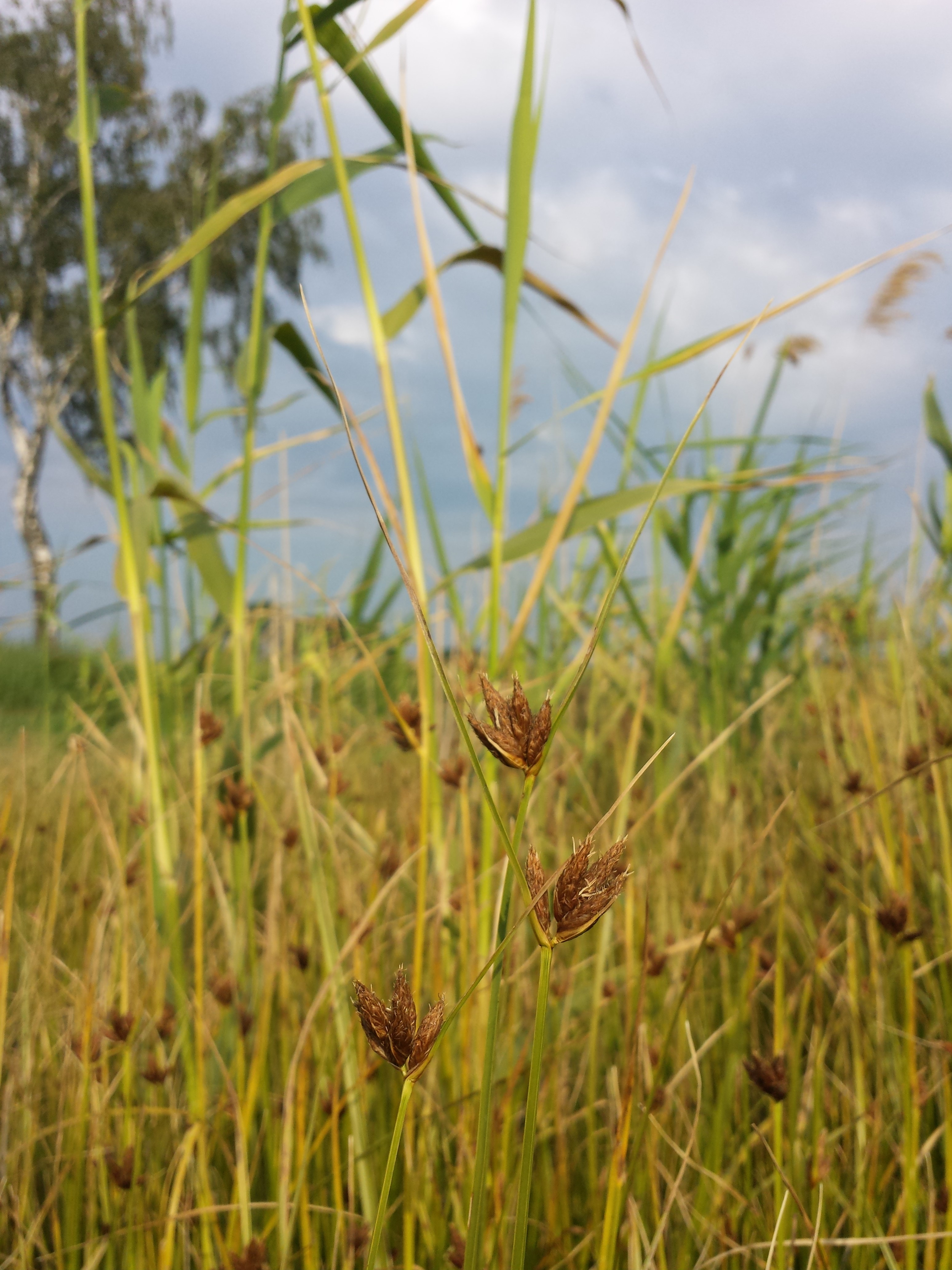

Scientific classification
- Kingdom: Plantae
- Clade: Tracheophytes
- Clade: Angiosperms
- Clade: Monocots
- Clade: Commelinids
- Order: Poales
- Family: Cyperaceae
- Genus: Bolboschoenus
- Species: B. planiculmis

Binomial name
- Bolboschoenus planiculmis T.V.Egorova, 1967

Synonyms
- Scirpus planiculmis F.Schmidt; Scirpus maritimus var. distigmaticus Scirpus koshewnikowii Litv. Scirpus biconcavus Ohwi; Bolboschoenus koshewnikowii (Litv.) A.E.Kozhevn.

= Bolboschoenus planiculmis =

Flat-stem clubrush

Species of flowering plant in the sedge family

Bolboschoenus planiculmis is a species of flowering plant in the sedge family Cyperaceae. It sprouts from tubers or seeds from April to May and flowers between May and July, with the aboveground biomass dying back in October. It is distributed in estuaries across and throughout East Asia, Central Asia, and Central Europe with small populations reported in Western European countries such as the Netherlands. B. planiculmis can be identified by its bifid styles as opposed to the trifid styles which are found on all other Bolboschoenus species in Europe.

== Ecology ==
Bolboschoenus planiculmis is a perennial clonal plant with a height of 20–100 centimeters (8–40 in) that reproduces both sexually through seeds and asexually through vegetative propagation. As the fruits of B. planiculmis are floatable, it has been suggested that spreading after floods is a possible means of distribution.

Bolboschoenus planiculmis is a key wetland plant in many areas. Although it is a glycophyte, B. planiculmis was found to be more salt-tolerant than other freshwater species, as is consistent with its propagation in saline habitats, alkaline water, and mineral-rich substrates. It has also shown adaptability to agricultural management, i.e. in pastures or arable land on the sites of former saline habitats. Like many Bolboschoenus species, it is commonly distributed in saline wetlands and occupies a wide variety of habitats in both coastal and inland salt marshes; it adapts easily and well to both temporarily flood terrestrial areas as well as long-term dry periods in the form of dormant underground tubers. However, as it is usually smaller than other Bolboschoenus species, i.e. Bolboschoenus laticarpus and Bolboschoenus yagara, they are suppressed by high water levels and are only found rarely in streams or ponds. The adaptability of B. planiculmis to so many climes has caused it to become a nuance species in the Czech Republic, particularly in maize fields.

In Songnen Plain of northeastern China, its root tubers are a food source for the endangered Siberian crane. In South Korea along the Nakdong River Estuary, B. planiculmis tubers are a major food for swan geese and other migratory waterfowl. The estuary is located in the middle of the East Asian–Australasian Flyway where more than 170,000 birds of 157 species are monitored. B. planiculmis beds in the Nakdong estuary are major overwintering habitat for these birds. However, B. planiculmis is declining in East Asia due to the degradation of estuarine marshes as a result of embankments, land reclamation, and increased flooding from monsoons due to climate change. B. planiculmis is significantly affected by tidal restrictions from embankments as it grows in low elevation, and is affected by the accumulation of water in tide-restricted marshes with poor drainage during monsoon season, causing increased water depth and duration of flooding.

An et al. (2021) found in observational trials that the optimum water depth for B. planiculmis growth and reproduction was 11.2–36.1 cm (4.4–14.2 in).
