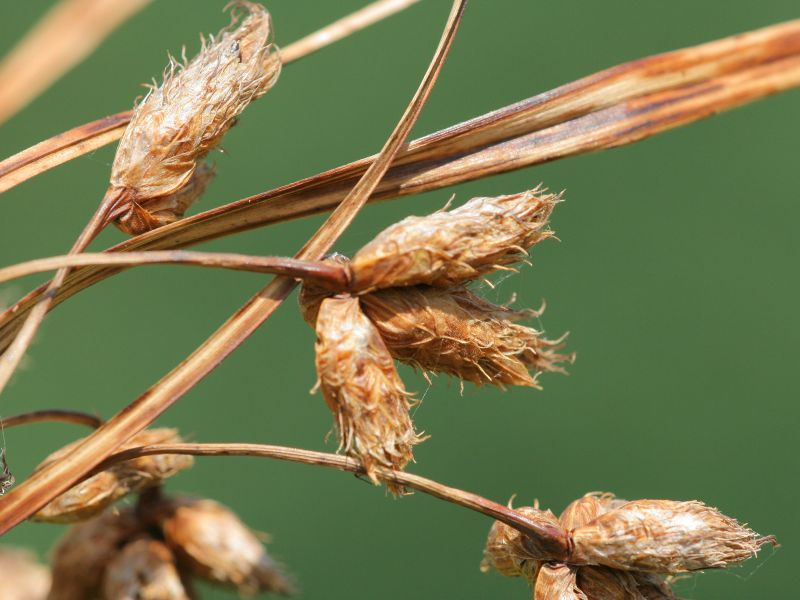
- B. yagara infructescences

Scientific classification
- Kingdom: Plantae
- Clade: Tracheophytes
- Clade: Angiosperms
- Clade: Monocots
- Clade: Commelinids
- Order: Poales
- Family: Cyperaceae
- Genus: Bolboschoenus (Asch.) Palla in Hallier & Brand

Type species
- Bolboschoenus maritimus

Synonyms
- Reigera Opiz; Scirpocyperus Ség.; Scirpus sect. Bolboschoenus Asch. (basionym)

= Bolboschoenus =

Genus of flowering plants in the sedge family

Bolboschoenus is a genus of plants in the sedge family, of nearly cosmopolitan distribution. Epipaleolithic and Neolithic peoples used ground root tubers of these plants to make the first breads.

Accepted species

- Bolboschoenus caldwellii (V.J.Cook) Soják – Australia, New Zealand
- Bolboschoenus capensis (Burm.f.) Holub – Cape Province of South Africa
- Bolboschoenus fluviatilis (Torr.) Soják – Australia, New Zealand, New Caledonia, Canada, United States, northeastern Mexico
- Bolboschoenus glaucus (Lam.) S.G.Sm. – southern Europe, Africa, Middle East, Central Asia, India, Mongolia
- Bolboschoenus grandispicus (Steud.) Lewej. & Lobin – coastal dunes in Senegal
- Bolboschoenus laticarpus Marhold, Hroudová, Ducháček & Zákr – central Europe from Britain and France to Ukraine; Algeria, Turkey
- Bolboschoenus maritimus (L.) Palla in W.D.J.Koch – widespread across much of temperate and subtropical Europe, Africa, Asia, North America, South America and various islands
- Bolboschoenus medianus (V.J.Cook) Soják – Australia, New Zealand
- Bolboschoenus nobilis (Ridl.) Goetgh. & D.A.Simpson – Angola, Namibia
- Bolboschoenus novae-angliae (Britton) S.G.Sm. – northeastern United States from Maine south along the seacoast to Georgia
- Bolboschoenus planiculmis (F.Schmidt) T.V.Egorova – much of Europe and Asia from Spain to Japan and south to New Guinea
- Bolboschoenus robustus (Pursh) Soják – eastern United States; California, Bermuda, Bahamas, east coast of Mexico (from Tamaulipas to Tabasco), New Brunswick, northern South America
- Bolboschoenus schmidii (Raymond) Holub – Iran, Central Asia
- Bolboschoenus stagnicola (Raymond) Soják. – Pakistan
- Bolboschoenus yagara (Ohwi) Y.C.Yang & M.Zhan – northern Eurasia from Germany and Sweden to Japan and Kamchatka, including Russia, Siberia, China
