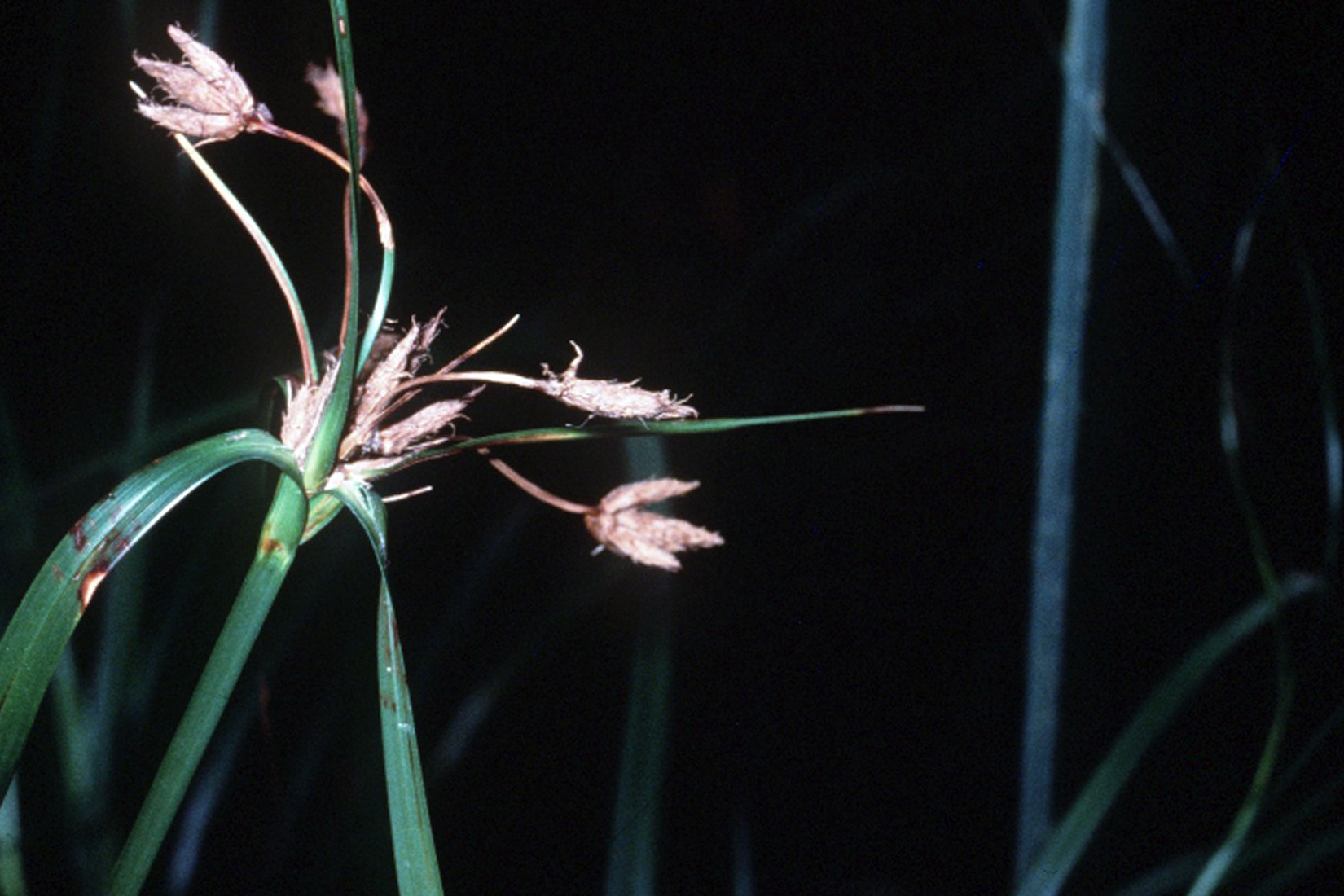

Scientific classification
- Kingdom: Plantae
- Clade: Tracheophytes
- Clade: Angiosperms
- Clade: Monocots
- Clade: Commelinids
- Order: Poales
- Family: Cyperaceae
- Genus: Bolboschoenus
- Species: B. fluviatilis

Binomial name
- Bolboschoenus fluviatilis (Torr.) A. Gray

Synonyms
- Scirpus fluviatilis; Schoenoplectus fluviatilis

= Bolboschoenus fluviatilis =

River bulrush

Species of flowering plant in the sedge family

Bolboschoenus fluviatilis, the river bulrush, is a species of flowering plant in the sedge family, Cyperaceae. Its range includes Australia, New Zealand, New Caledonia, Canada, the United States, and northeastern Mexico. B. fluviatilis and its fruits are important as food sources for waterfowl such as geese, ducks, bitterns, and swans. It also provides cover and nesting sites for these and other species of birds, as well as small mammals. Like other Bolboschoenus species, B. fluviatilis has strong tubers and rhizomes which help to stabilize intertidal habitats by preventing erosion.

== Habitat ==
River bulrush can be found in fresh water or brackish water marshes, and in the quiet waters of streams and lakes. It has been shown to propagate and flourish in a wide variety of water depths, but produces the most biomass in shallowly flooded conditions. B. fluviatilis, and other bulrush species, are threatened by pollution, habitat destruction, and competition from invasive plant species such as Typha angustifolia and Phragmites australis in the Hudson Valley.
