= Bolboschoenus medianus =

Conservation status
- Priority One — Poorly Known Taxa (DEC)

Scientific classification
- Kingdom: Plantae
- Clade: Tracheophytes
- Clade: Angiosperms
- Clade: Monocots
- Clade: Commelinids
- Order: Poales
- Family: Cyperaceae
- Genus: Bolboschoenus
- Species: B. medianus

Binomial name
- Bolboschoenus medianus (V.J.Cook) Soják

Species of flowering plant in the sedge family

Bolboschoenus medianus is a flowering plant in the sedge family, Cyperaceae, that is native to Western Australia.

The grass-like plant is rhizomatous and perennial producing red-brown flowers.

It found in and along lakes and creeks along coastal areas in a couple of isolated areas in the Peel and South West regions where it grows in muddy soils.
