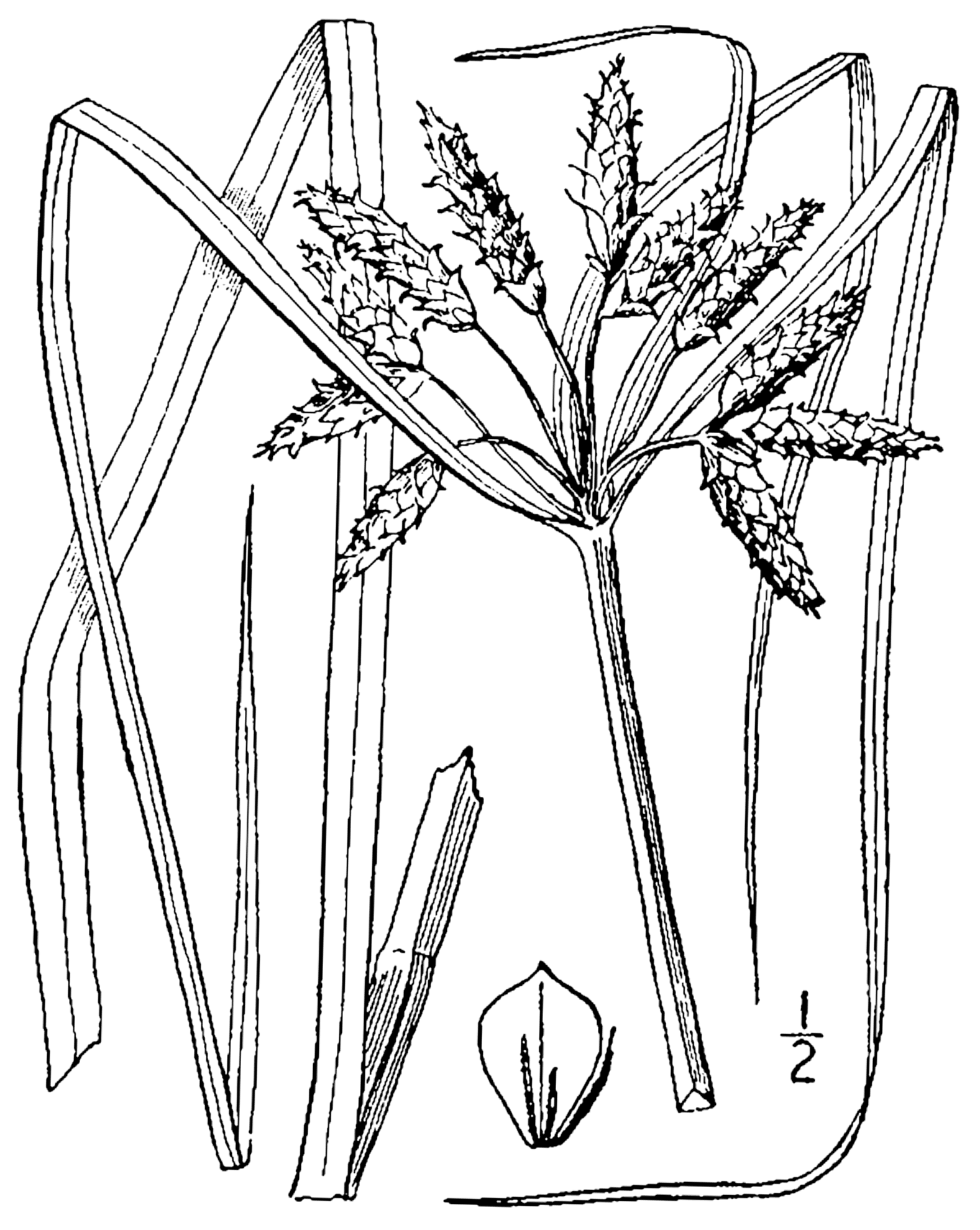

Conservation status
- Data Deficient (IUCN 3.1)

- Vulnerable (NatureServe)

Scientific classification
- Kingdom: Plantae
- Clade: Embryophytes
- Clade: Tracheophytes
- Clade: Spermatophytes
- Clade: Angiosperms
- Clade: Monocots
- Clade: Commelinids
- Order: Poales
- Family: Cyperaceae
- Genus: Bolboschoenus
- Species: B. novae-angliae

Binomial name
- Bolboschoenus novae-angliae (Britton) S.G.Sm.

Synonyms
- Schoenoplectus novae-angliae (Britton) M.T.Strong; Scirpus campestris var. novae-angliae (Britton) Fernald; Scirpus cylindricus Britton; Scirpus maritimus var. cylindricus Torr.; Scirpus novae-angliae Britton; Scirpus robustus var. novae-angliae (Britton) Beetle

= Bolboschoenus novae-angliae =

New England bulrush

Species of flowering plant in the sedge family

Bolboschoenus novae-angliae, common names New England bulrush and Salt marsh bulrush, is a plant species found along the Atlantic seacoast of the United States from Alabama to Maine (although there are no records of the plant from South Carolina, and reports from Alabama, Georgia, and North Carolina remain unconfirmed). It grows in brackish and salt-water marshes and estuaries along the coast.

Bolboschoenus novae-angliae is a perennial herb up to 150 cm (80 inches) tall, spreading by means of underground rhizomes. Culms are triangular in cross-section. Flowers and fruits are borne in spikelets at the tip of the culm. Achenes are variable in shape, sometimes compressed, sometimes trigonous, the two shapes sometimes present on the same plant.

It is listed as a special concern species in Connecticut.
