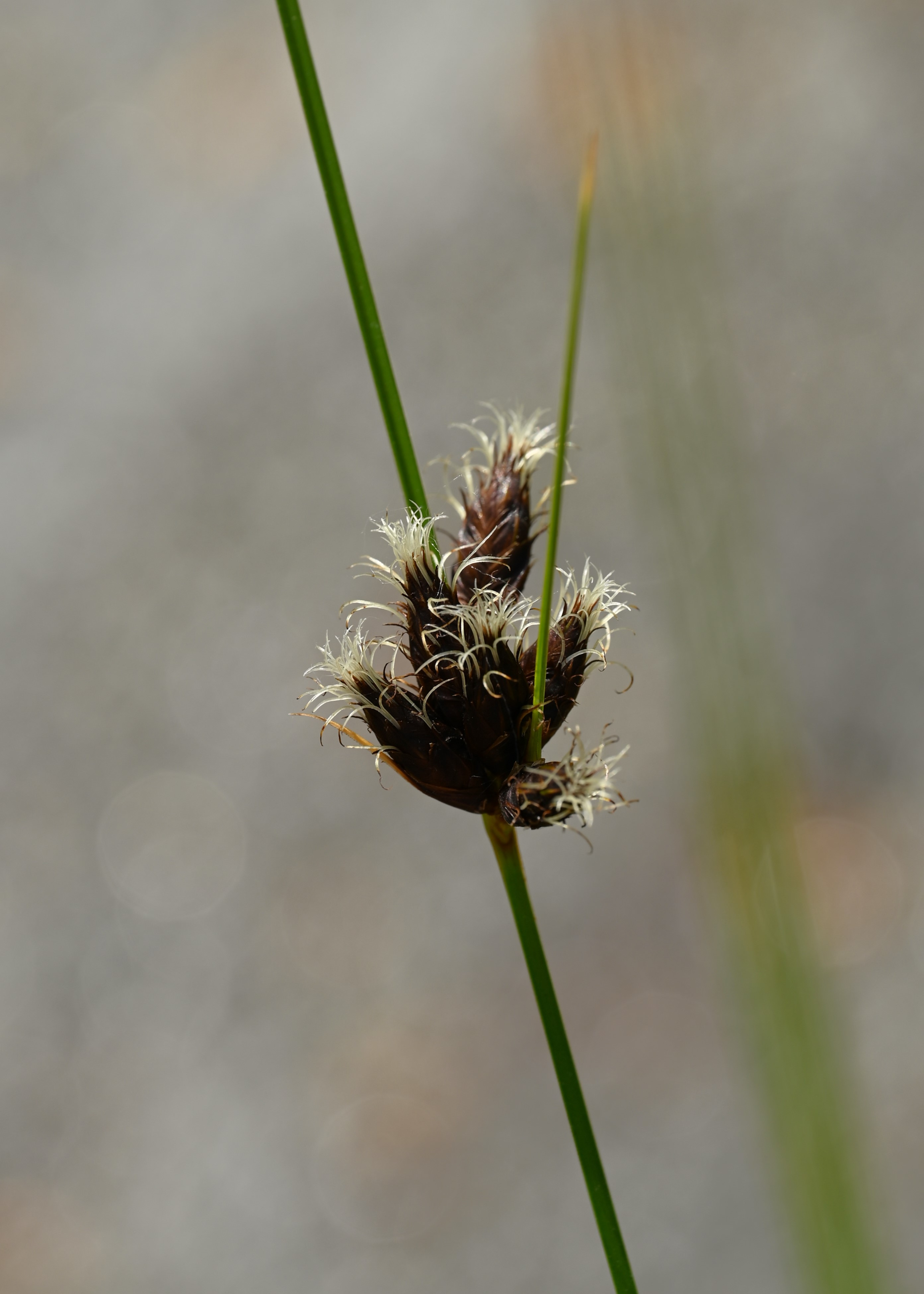
- In the Jardín Botánico Dunas del Odiel

Conservation status
- Least Concern (IUCN 3.1)

Scientific classification
- Kingdom: Plantae
- Clade: Tracheophytes
- Clade: Angiosperms
- Clade: Monocots
- Clade: Commelinids
- Order: Poales
- Family: Cyperaceae
- Genus: Bolboschoenus
- Species: B. glaucus

Binomial name
- Bolboschoenus glaucus (Lam.) S.G.Sm.

Synonyms
- List: Bolboschoenus macrostachys (Willd.) Grossh.; Bolboschoenus maritimus var. macrostachys (Willd.) T.V.Egorova; Bolboschoenus maritimus subsp. macrostachys (Willd.) Soják; Bolboschoenus maritimus subsp. tuberosus (Desf.) T.Koyama; Bolboschoenus tuberosus (Desf.) Hadac; Reigera maritimus var. tuberosus (Desf.) Opiz; Scirpus glaucus Lam.; Scirpus macrostachys Willd.; Scirpus maritimus var. glaucus (Lam.) Nees; Scirpus maritimus var. macrostachys (Willd.) Dumort.; Scirpus maritimus f. macrostachys (Willd.) Nilsson; Scirpus maritimus var. tuberosus (Desf.) Schrad.; Scirpus tuberosus Desf.

= Bolboschoenus glaucus =

Species of plant

Bolboschoenus glaucus, the tuberous bulrush, is a widespread species of flowering plant in the family Cyperaceae. It is native to most of Africa, Madagascar, southern Europe, the Black and Caspian Sea regions, Western and Central Asia, Mongolia, Pakistan, and India, and it has been introduced to the United States and central Europe. A facultative wetland species, it has been assessed as Least Concern. Its nutlets and tubers are edible, and its charred remains appear in large quantities in Near Eastern archaeological sites from the Late Epipalaeolithic to the Pre-Pottery Neolithic.
