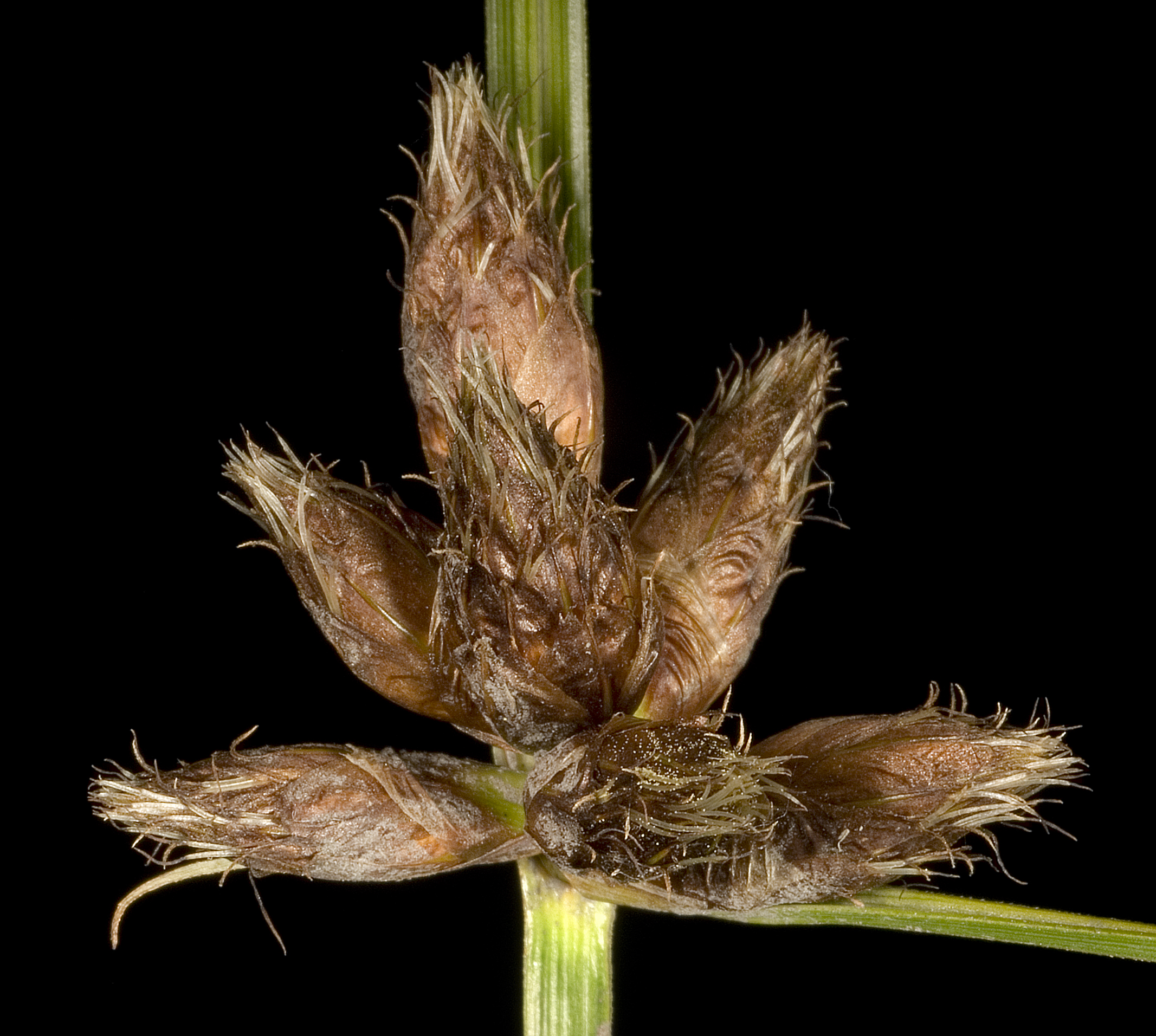

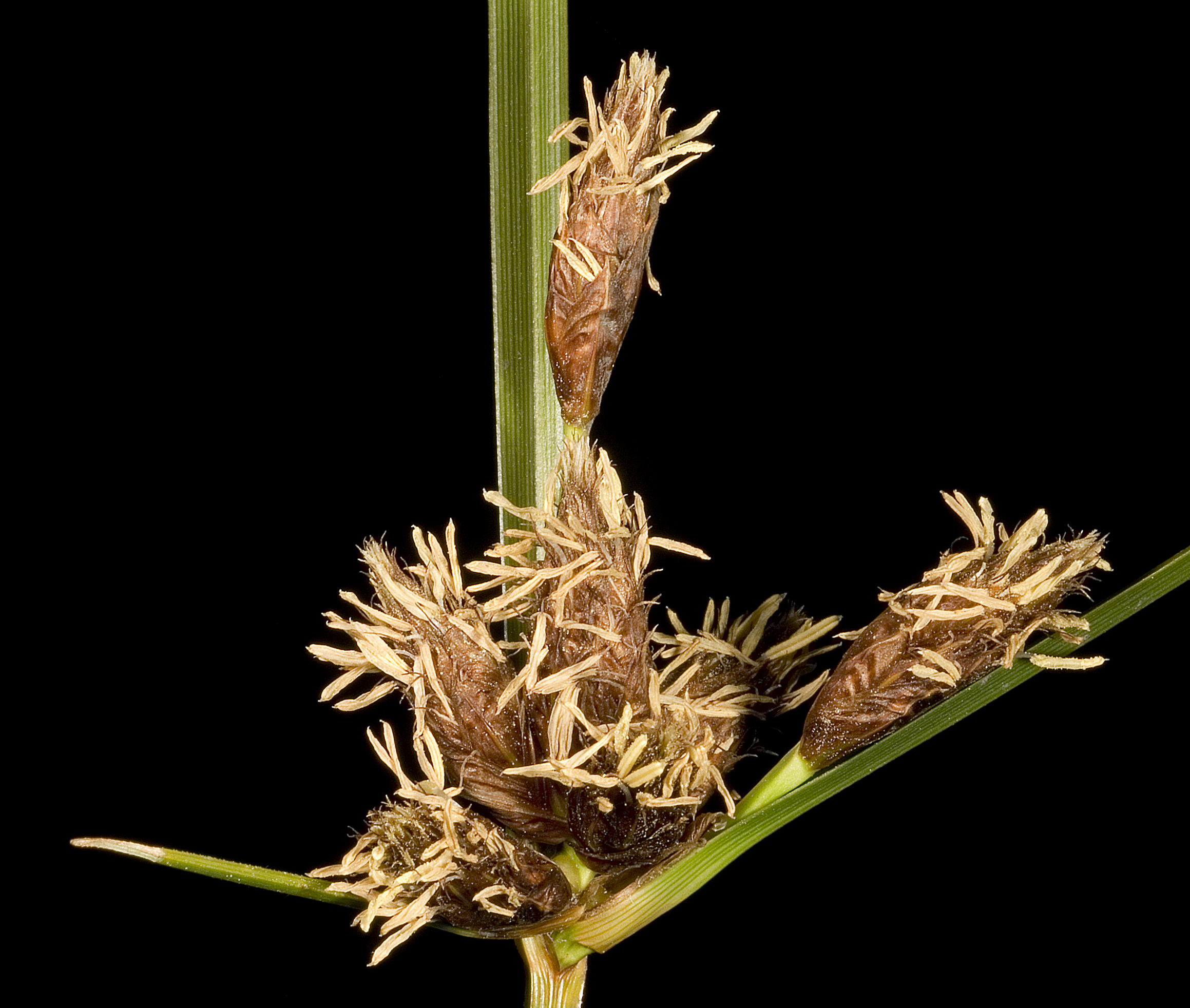

Scientific classification
- Kingdom: Plantae
- Clade: Tracheophytes
- Clade: Angiosperms
- Clade: Monocots
- Clade: Commelinids
- Order: Poales
- Family: Cyperaceae
- Genus: Bolboschoenus
- Species: B. caldwellii

Binomial name
- Bolboschoenus caldwellii (V.J.Cook) Soják

= Bolboschoenus caldwellii =

Species of flowering plant in the sedge family

Bolboschoenus caldwellii, commonly known as marsh club rush, is a flowering plant in the sedge family, Cyperaceae, that is native to Australia and New Zealand.

The robust grass-like plant is rhizomatous and perennial. It typically grows to a height of 0.3 to 1.2 metres (1.0 to 3.9 ft). It blooms between August and March producing yellow-brown flowers.

It's found in drains and swamps and on the margins of brackish lakes and creeks along coastal areas in Western Australia in the Mid West, Wheatbelt, Peel, South West, Great Southern and Goldfields-Esperance regions where it grows in muddy-silty to clay-sandy soils.
