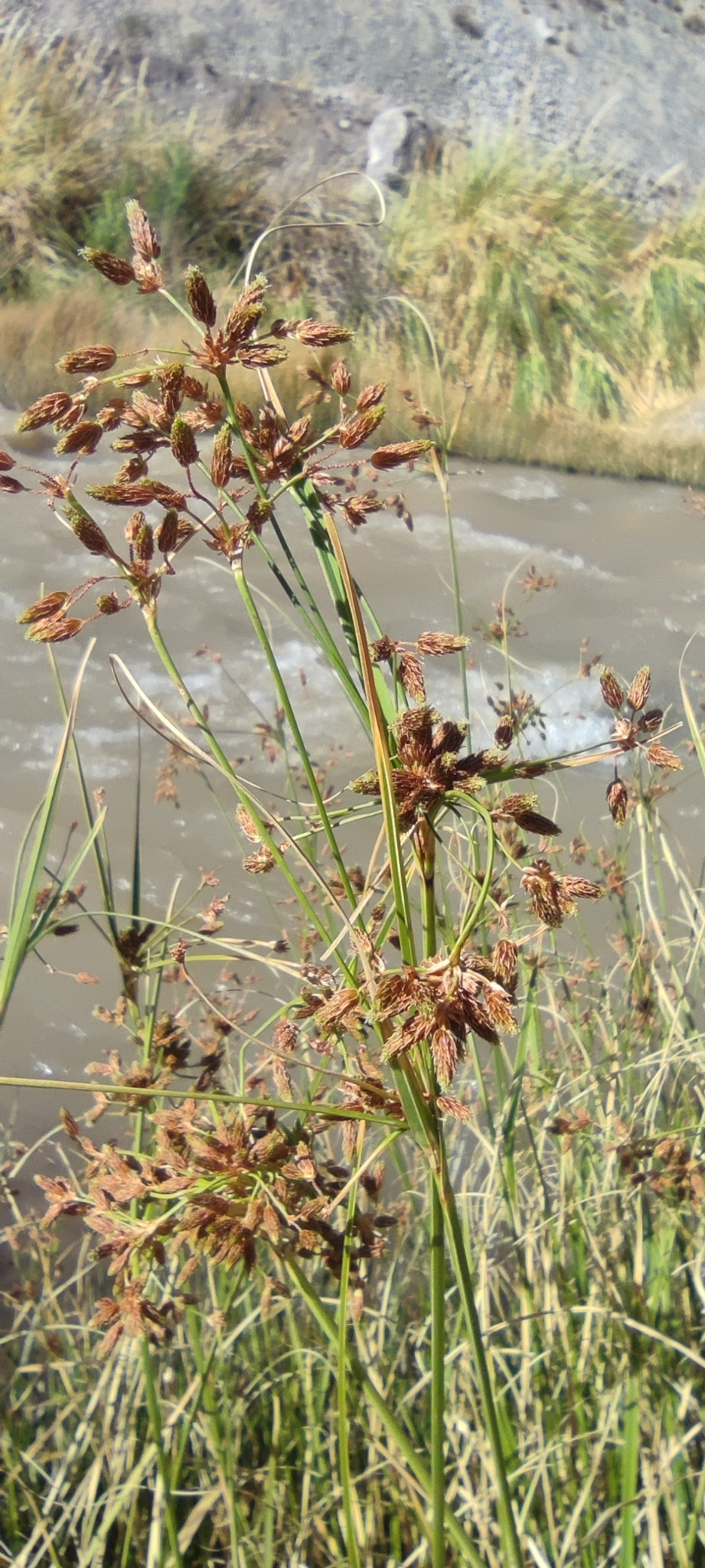
- R. asper in Vicuña, Chile

Scientific classification
- Kingdom: Plantae
- Clade: Tracheophytes
- Clade: Angiosperms
- Clade: Monocots
- Clade: Commelinids
- Order: Poales
- Family: Cyperaceae
- Genus: Rhodoscirpus; Léveillé-Bourret, Donadío & J.R.Starr
- Species: R. asper

Binomial name
- Rhodoscirpus asper (J.Presl & C.Presl) Lév.-Bourret, Donadío & J.R.Starr

= Rhodoscirpus =

Genus of plants

Rhodoscirpus is a monotypic genus of flowering plants belonging to the family Cyperaceae. The only species is Rhodoscirpus asper. It was reclassified from the previous Scirpus asper. It is a South American species native to Peru, Bolivia, north and central Chile and Argentina.
