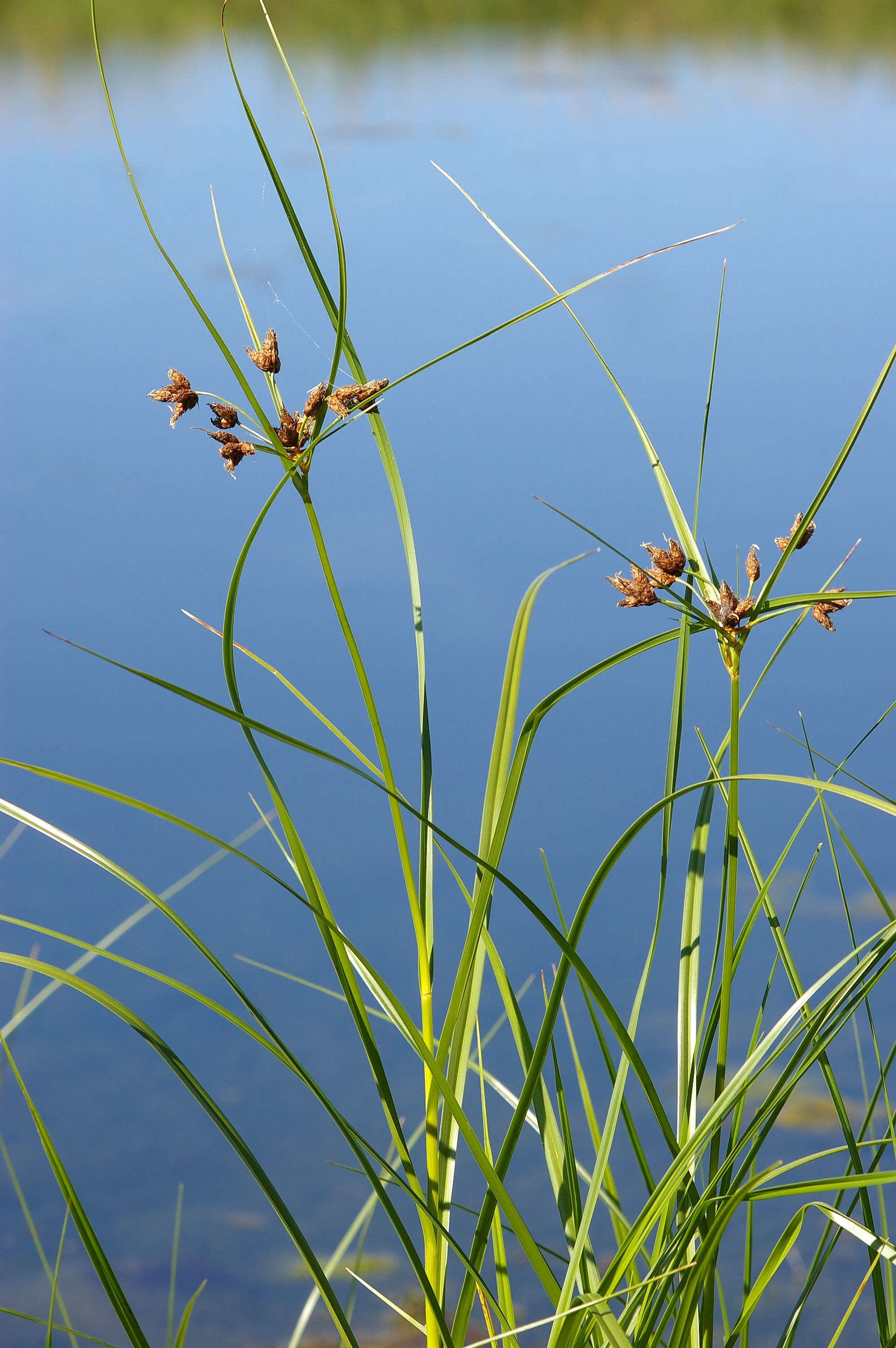

Scientific classification
- Kingdom: Plantae
- Clade: Tracheophytes
- Clade: Angiosperms
- Clade: Monocots
- Clade: Commelinids
- Order: Poales
- Family: Cyperaceae
- Genus: Bolboschoenus
- Species: B. maritimus

Binomial name
- Bolboschoenus maritimus (L.) Palla

Synonyms
- List: Scirpus maritimus L.; Reigera maritima (L.) Opiz; Schoenoplectus maritimus (L.) Lye; Scirpus macrostachyos Lam.; Scirpus compactus Hoffm.; Scirpus aegyptiacus Poir. in J.B.A.M.de Lamarck; Scirpus riparius Pers.; Scirpus tridentatus Roxb.; Scirpus vulgaris Mazziari; Scirpus decumanus Willd. ex Kunth; Scirpus lucidus Less. ex Kunth; Scirpus swampianus Bosc ex Kunth; Scirpus salinus Schmidt ex Steud.; Schoenus macrostachyus Noë ex Rchb; Scirpus megastachyus Steud.; Scirpus squarrosulus Steud.; Scirpus strobiliferus Steud.; Scirpocyperus septentrionalis Montandon; Scirpus auronitens Nees & Ehrenb. ex Boeckeler; Scirpus laciniatus Nees & Ehrenb. ex Boeckeler; Scirpus hyalinolepis Steud. ex Jard; Scirpus polyopsis Bubani; Bolboschoenus compactus (Hoffm.) Drobow; plus many infraspecific names

= Bolboschoenus maritimus =

Sea clubrush

Species of flowering plant in the sedge family

Bolboschoenus maritimus is a species of flowering plant from family Cyperaceae. Common names for this species include sea clubrush, cosmopolitan bulrush, alkali bulrush, saltmarsh bulrush, and bayonet grass. It is found in seaside wetland habitats over much of the world. It is widespread across much of temperate and subtropical Africa, Asia, Europe, North America, South America and various islands.

== Habitat ==
As a halophyte, B. maritimus is usually found in saline habitats, including the northern coast of the North and Baltic Sea, Scandinavia, and in coastal western and southern Europe, as well as inland in northern Poland, Pannonia, and as far east as the Ural Mountains. B. maritimus often dominates in areas with saline, muddy substrates that are rich in minerals with substantial water level fluctuations that typically flood in spring and early summer. However these habitats have grown in economic importance and are used intensively for livestock grazing, which has led to the disappearance of B. maritimus from its historical range, exacerbated by land reclamation, invasive species, and conversion to arable land.
