= Drought refuge =

Concept in Ecology

A drought refuge is a site that provides permanent fresh water or moist conditions for plants and animals, acting as a refuge habitat when surrounding areas are affected by drought and allowing ecosystems and core species populations to survive until the drought breaks. Drought refuges are important for conserving ecosystems in places where the effects of climatic variability are exacerbated by human activities.

== Description ==
Reliable drought refuges are characterised by the ability to retain sufficient water throughout the drought, having water quality good enough to maintain the life of the ecosystem that are not subject to physical disturbance and that have access to surrounding habitat, so that refugees can recolonise the main habitat when the drought ends.

For fish and aquatic invertebrates a drought refuge may be an isolated permanent pool in a stream that ceases to flow and mostly dries up during a period of drought. Permanent wetlands may serve as non-breeding drought refuges for a range of waterbirds that nest at ephemeral lakes when these are inundated.

The NSW Government defines drought refuges as:

A depression area that is instream or across the floodplain that retains water for a significant period of time relative to the surrounding landscape and provides vital habitat for native water-dependent biota during dry spells, drought and low flow. Examples of aquatic drought refuge include wetlands, waterholes, pools.

For some species the refuge is their only water source and is necessary for survival. For birds and invertebrate taxa, the drought refuge is not only necessary for survival but contributes to their reproductive success. Some organisms are able to adapt to the environment when there is a drought, but adapting traits that will be beneficial for survival in a prolonged drought is extremely difficult to accomplish.

== Terms refuge and drought ==
The term refugium (plural: refugia) was originally used by evolutionary biologists for refuges that protected entire species from disturbance events of large temporal and spatial scales, such as glaciation or the long-term effects of climate change. A disturbance involves a temporary removal of biomass resulting in change in physical environment. Smaller-scale ecologists now use this term synonymously with the simpler term refuge, to define places that protect populations of plants or animals from smaller-scale disturbances, such as fire, flood, storm, or human impacts. Refugia are the habitats or environmental factors that give spatial and temporal resistance and resilience to biotic communities impacted by disturbance. Here negative effects of disturbance are lower than surrounding areas or times. Refugia buffer species long-term, where as, a refuge buffers species short-term.

There are other uses of the term refuge, such as for a wildlife reserve or a place free from predators (predation refuge). A refuge is a place or situation that provides safety or shelter. Here, species are minimally affected by changing climate conditions.

Lack of precipitation causes drying of aquatic ecosystems and leads to a natural disturbance called a drought. In order for organisms to survive a drought, the disturbance must be minimal or there must be a drought refuge available.

== Effects of drought ==
The severity of a disturbance is measured by its intensity, duration, and recovery time. Intensity and duration influence the strength of a disturbance and the likelihood of the survival of organisms within an area. Recovery time influences the level of recovery abundance and composition in a disturbed habitat until next stimulus forces species to seek shelter. Disturbances, such as drought, influence spatial and temporal patterns of refuge use, as well as the role of refuges in community dynamics. Variability in patterns of disturbance affect refuge use patterns and community structure. Decreased time between disturbances increases refuge usage until a certain frequency is reached and the usage declines as a result of the weakening resilience and resistance of a species. Refuge degradation increases mortality for sensitive species during larger disturbance times.

Droughts decrease surface area and volume, while increasing physical and chemical water quality extremes, such as, temperature levels, oxygen concentration and water levels. This links with interactions that structure the communities of different species and affects mortality, birth and migration rates. During a drought, species must seek refuge or have adaptations that provide refuge.

Hydrological extremes, such as flood and drought, modify habitats. Droughts lead to not only the loss of habitats, but also to isolated habitat patches created by the separation of populations which together form a meta population. Increased density of organisms is another result of droughts. Increased organism density leads to resource limitations, movement limitations, increased competition, and increased predation pressure. Droughts also cause changes in food resources and water quality.

== Function and importance of drought refuges ==
Drought refuges protect plant and animal populations from extreme weather events as climate trends evolve . They serve as places that support populations of plants and animals not able to live elsewhere in a landscape during disturbance events, whether those events are seasonal and relatively predictable, or otherwise. A habitat's ability to act as a refuge depends on the disturbance. The ability of a refuge to retain water becomes essential for the maintenance of most populations. Refuges of sufficient size and duration maintain populations, sustain biodiversity and may harbour relict populations. They are of particular importance during increasing aridification when few other suitable habitats remain. Biota depend heavily on seasonal refuges. Refuges increase survival rate and recovery time of populations experiencing an environmental disturbance. Refugial effectiveness is the ability of a refuge to fulfill habitat-related criteria. Knowledge of refuges in mediterranean and semi-arid streams and rivers has increased during the last decade.

The disturbance process and the recolonization process are two ecological processes which are associated with how refuges function. The disturbance process makes locations into refuges and the recolonization process restocks the wider landscape once a disturbance has passed. Recolonization is driven by resistance, local survival in drought refuges, or resilience, high local mortality with individuals moving back to streams when conditions improve.

The processes of disturbance, refuge formation, refuge function and recolonization occur at varying temporal and spatial scales. The spatial distribution of refuges influences the usage and recolonization. Spatial factors alone have a small contribution. Refuges vary with morphological and physicochemical factors as well; contribution is shared. Refuges can be small or large and can be used for short or long periods of time.

Refugia are relative depending on species adaptations, spatial and temporal scale, and disturbance regime. Many relative influences are unclear as each situation is different. Drought refuges are important for sustaining biodiversity over larger spatial scales.

Perennial waters are the most important drought refuge. As refuges, they require the least investment by stream invertebrates and have the greatest biodiversity. Perennial surface water is crucial to the survival of macroinvertebrate and fish. Differences in longitudinal pattern affect the location and function of perennial water refuges.

Refuge occupancy is predictable based on species' traits, but not all suitable refuges within a system are occupied. Refuge community structure is mostly constant because the response to a disturbance carries across a species; the same species takes advantage of the same type of refuge. Refugia play a central role in the structuring of communities. Most non-perennial stream taxa appear to have more than one potential refuge from drought. The primary determinant of which drought refuges a species uses in a landscape are its intrinsic traits.

There are specific regions (refuges) to which individuals move during a drought, and within these regions there are specific characteristics of sites used as refuges by different species. A species may use more than one type of refuge during its life cycle. A variation in refuge use is caused by topography, individual species susceptibility and response to disturbance. Patterns of refuge use are influenced by disturbance type, species type, patch size, potential occupants and location. These patterns are poorly understood.

Drought refuges form habitat mosaics which are prone to increased fragmentation by flow regulation. Some mosaics are more vulnerable to water abstraction than others. The drying of pools results in a patchy mosaic of pools in a dry channel which vary in suitability for different species and life stages. Different species favor different sized pools in different locations with different physicochemical properties. Refuges with low abundance of species require less effort to be adequate than diverse refuges. The size of a pool influences the set of species, total number of organisms, and assembly structure because of physicochemical factors. Species richness and abundance are related to pool morphology. Shade, location, and soil composition are all contributing factors. Heavily shaded pools have colder water, where as lightly shaded pools have increased levels of primary productivity. Large refuges have increased abundance and enrichment and are likely to persist through long disturbances.

While used infrequently and often containing only few individuals during normal years, range edges may episodically serve as refuges from extreme weather events or conditions such as drought. During these extreme conditions, survival probability, reproductive success or both is higher at the edge than in the core of its range.

Refuge use is influenced by habitat characteristics, such as hydraulic exchange and sediment type, active migration or passive habitat use and species morphology, behaviour and physiology. A decline in refuge use is due to decreased effectiveness of mortality reduction and reduced time provided for community recovery which leads to reduced time between disturbances.

Movement into and out of refuge creates predictable fluxes of biomass and nutrients. This is important in food webs and the ecosystem. A dense amount of nutrients in one location during a disturbance means increased competition and predation. Rates of mortality, birth, migration, and interactions among components of the biota that have retreated to refugia are affected by the nature of the refuge. The spatial extent, the rate of drying, and the ambient physical and chemical conditions are all contributors.

Drought refuges for algae are wide- spread because most med-river taxa can survive desiccation and show little specificity for refuges, provided drying occurs slowly. They include dry biofilm on stones and wood, dry leaf packs and perennial pools. Refuges for macrophytes and zooplankton typically comprise egg and seed banks in med-rivers and are resilient to prolonged drying.

== Importance of Refuge Connectivity ==
Drought leads to a shift in refuge spacing and connections at different spatial and temporal scales. Droughts disrupt hydrological connectivity and impact resident species through loss of water and flow from drying, habitat reduction, and reconfiguration. Delivery of water is restricted to areas within a stream network. Habitat patches engineered by members of community serve as refuges that are crucial for other members. Trails and ponds dug by certain species, like alligators, allow for dispersal into refuges. Hydraulic exchange provides movement of water, nutrients, and organisms into a refuge. Populations of sessile organisms, like flora and fauna in perennial water refuges, cannot persist indefinitely without hydrological connections among refuges. Mobile organisms, like fish, will move into a refugia if there are no barriers, like physical obstructions (ex: dams, isolated pools), biotic factors (ex: predation, competition), and physicochemical factors (ex: low dissolved oxygen levels).

During smaller scale, shorter term disturbances, populations within refuges are not necessarily cut off from those in other refuges or those in other undisturbed landscapes, and so genetic exchange can still occur, or will occur during parts of the life cycle not constrained by the disturbance. Under those circumstances, the survival of a species is unlikely to depend upon a single refuge. Recovery processes need to restore connectivity, so that migration can occur from refuges to new patches of habitat. Perennially flowing streams may act as drought refuges for neighboring streams, even if they are not hydro logically connected to them. Refugees must be connected hydrologically at the appropriate times. For insects, refuges on one stream may support recolonization on adjacent streams that are not hydro logically connected, which may also necessitate conservation planning across catchment boundaries.

The drought from 1996 until 2009 had a great impact on the Murray-Darling Basin, in Northern Australia (Murphy and Timbal 2007; Umenhofer et al. 2009). When this drought occurred, it dried the wetlands and water storages (the drought refuge). For many species of birds and fish, the refuge is the only freshwater available. The body of water serves as food and shelter; therefore, it must be conserved. Drought refuges are likely to sustain biodiversity over larger spatial scales such as groups of streams or whole drainage networks. Chester, E. T. and Robson, B. J. (2011), Drought refuges, spatial scale and recolonization by invertebrates in non-perennial streams. Freshwater Biology, 56: 2094–2104.

== Different Types of Drought Refuge ==
A species may use more than one type of refuge during its life cycle. Refugia can be physical characteristics of organisms like short-term behavior or a long-term evolutionary adaptation. Animals and plants have mechanisms to increase resistance (survival) and resilience (recovery) to physical disturbance. They develop adaptations like morphology, physiology, behavior. Physical organism adaptations include an ability to aestivate, mouth orientation that allows for breathing oxygen at the water surface, body armor, and venomous spines. Mobile species' coping methods include refuge-seeking behavior; they seek habitat patches that relieve physiological stress and reduce mortality. Reliance on dispersal improves resilience to climate change in the short term, but over longer timescales, it will not protect macro invertebrate biodiversity from landscape-scale refuge degradation.

The hyporheic zone, a region along streambeds where groundwater mixes with surface water, is an important refuge for immobile organisms, like algae. The hyporheic zone protects from freezing, high temperature, and pollution. It reduces displacement, with its relatively stable, slow flow. In a hyporheic zone, free water is retained, and invertebrates remain submerged. The hyporheic zone has been shown to contribute colonists when surface flows recommence.

Perennial waters, whether pools, seeps or flowing sections of streams, have repeatedly been shown to be the major refuges. Perennially flowing stream sections and perennial pools act as drought refuges for a wider area of the landscape than the stream on which they are located. Refuges of a size sufficient to maintain whole populations, such as perennially flowing reaches, are likely to be most important and may, during aridification, become refugia containing relictual populations. Perennial pools and perennially flowing water generally harbor the greatest diversity of macro invertebrate taxa because they require the least investment by the invertebrates.

== Threats and conservation ==
Because drought refuges may provide the only sites allowing populations to persist during droughts, they are highly vulnerable to factors that affect water quality such as water pollution and sedimentation from anthropogenic runoff. Consequently, in areas subject to intermittent drought, habitat conservation requires the identification and protection of drought refuges.

Drought is specific to certain regions and climatic zones. Climate change in many med-regions may prolong dry periods and threaten refuges. The capacity for perennial refuges to support biodiversity may be severely compromised due to increasing water temperatures, reducing the quality of refuges by exceeding the thermal tolerance of invertebrates or by causing anoxia in stream pools and existing environmental degradation of many perennial water-ways.

Droughts have the ability to reduce agriculture products and be the cause loss of crops and lives. Hence, reserving the refuge is of extreme importance in more ways than one. In order to conserve the drought refuge for these species, action needs to be taken that will effect short term and long term impacts that the drought have on the species that dwell on it for survival. In California, efforts to conserve the drought refuge there, include reserving water when possible. Water conservation is done in order to migrating bird populations (National Wildlife Refuge; March, 1, 2016). The National wildlife refuge also takes part in mowing, disking, spraying and controlled burns. These measures are taken in an effort to stop non-native vegetation from growing; this type of vegetation typically out grows the native when in drought. Thus, allowing for native vegetation to survive during drought, leading to the dependent species to forage on the available vegetation. The clean water act was passed in order to protect the American waters from pollution. Although the act does not protect all waters, it protects many bodies of water. When drought refuges are polluted, they become an even greater danger for the dwelling species. The clean water act is just one step in cleaning waters, and saving drought refuges "(The Clean Water Rule; National Wildlife Organization)."

Continuous threats to the drought refuge conservation include; sedimentation, waterhole pumping, and the lack of the structure of the water, it is not near any other bodies of water. These of course, lead to situations where there is an extreme decrease in water availability. As water availability decreases, it increases the chances for dependent species to die out.

Groundwater aquifers support drought refuges for water-dependent ecosystems.Pollution and over-extraction of groundwater are both problematic because it lowers its ability to support groundwater-supplied drought refuges. Over-extraction lowers the water table and degrades water-dependent ecosystems. Over-extraction often occurs in areas with surface water scarcity and frequent drought; where groundwater refuges and refugia are most important. Man-made disturbances can mimic the effects of drought, like water withdrawal, and dams. Man-made channel modifications threaten the hyporheic zone as a refuge.

Groundwater salinization compromises buffering properties. Vegetation clearance, along with irrigation, causes serious issues. Irrigation increases the water table and mobilizes salts, and vegetation clearance allows it to come in contact with water habitats and vegetation. This stresses species not adapted to high salinity. High levels of salinity reduces water uptake in plants, by causing stomatal closure, reducing photosynthesis. Forests undergo decline in areas of high salinity and shallow groundwater depths because these conditions make them more susceptible to droughts. Forests undergo decline in areas of high salinity and shallow groundwater depths making them more susceptible to droughts.

There needs to be an increased focus on conservation efforts. Knowledge of refuge functions is critical for understanding their role in conservation of biodiversity, especially climatically sensitive species. Especially in regions where climate change is increasing the frequency and duration of dry periods. To best conserve species facing extreme weather events, it is necessary to identify conditions ‘pushing’ species, and, more importantly, to identify the refuge sites to which individuals move. Perennially flowing streams and perennial pools may be crucially important for sustaining biodiversity within a mosaic of stream habitats with drier flow regimes. The primary emphasis of drought refuge protection should be on protecting perennial surface waters and range edges within that landscape. Conservation approaches for river systems will need to focus on identifying and conserving refuges together with maintaining refuge connectivity, reducing the impacts of other disturbances on these systems, and sustaining predictable seasonal flow patterns.

Releases from hydroelectricity reservoirs could be used to lower river water temperatures or replenish reaches of formerly perennial flow, thereby creating refuges for river biota. Also, focusing on maintaining groundwater quality is more beneficial than focusing on surface water resources. Re-vegetation can reduce water pollution in ground and surface water, benefitting biodiversity. There is increasing evidence that habitats created by humans, such as canals, ditches, and farm ponds can support freshwater biodiversity and, therefore, have potential to provide refuges. They can prevent larger organisms, like fish, from becoming stranded as water levels decrease. While the preservation of refuges is crucial to provide recolonization sources, it is not sufficient if colonists cannot get from the refuge to habitat patches suitable for colonization.

Conversely, where management of pest species is necessary, controlling them in their drought refuges during droughts may be more cost-effective than broad-scale control at other times. One example of this is controlling rabbits in arid and semi-arid regions of Australia.

== See also ==
- Refuge (ecology)
