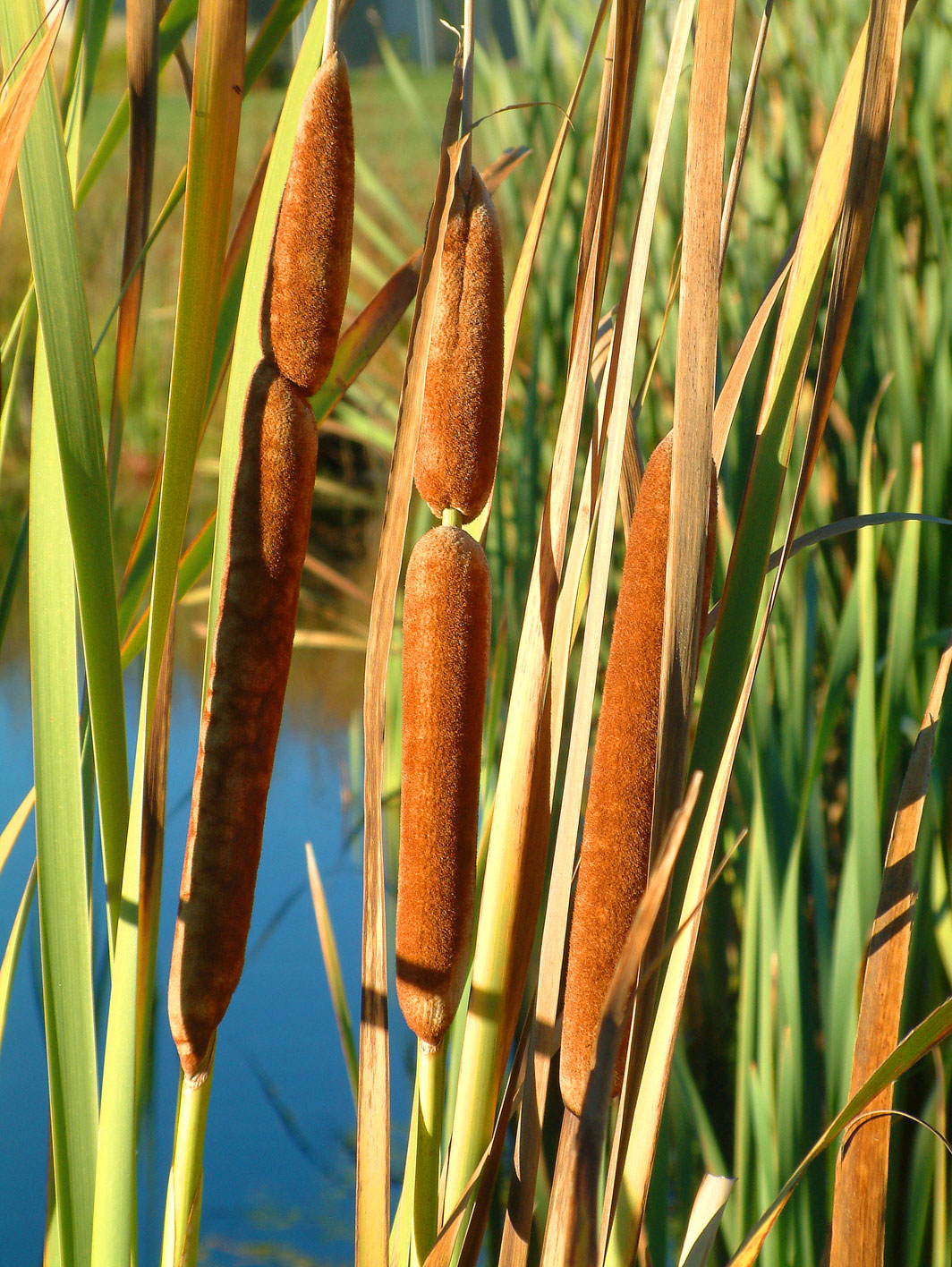
- Leaves and flower spikes of Typha orientalis

Conservation status
- Least Concern (IUCN 3.1)

Scientific classification
- Kingdom: Plantae
- Clade: Tracheophytes
- Clade: Angiosperms
- Clade: Monocots
- Clade: Commelinids
- Order: Poales
- Family: Typhaceae
- Genus: Typha
- Species: T. orientalis

Binomial name
- Typha orientalis C.Presl

Synonyms
- Typha japonica Miq.; Typha latifolia var. orientalis (C. Presl) Rohrb.; Typha muelleri Rohrb.; Typha orientalis var. brunnea Skvortsov in Baranov & Skvortsov; Typha shuttleworthii subsp. orientalis (C. Presl) Graebn.; Typha shuttleworthii var. orientalis (C. Presl) Rohrb.

= Typha orientalis =

Species of flowering plant

Typha orientalis, commonly known as bulrush, cumbungi, or raupō, (Note: Māori pronunciation: [ˈɾauˌpɔː].) is a perennial herbaceous plant in the genus Typha. It is native to Australia, New Zealand, Malaysia, Indonesia, Japan, Korea, Mongolia, Myanmar, Philippines, China and the Russian Far East (Sakhalin and Primorye).

T. orientalis is a wetland plant that grows on the edges of ponds, lakes, salt marshes, and slow flowing rivers and streams.

== Description ==
Typha orientalis is a perennial herb which grows up to 3 m (9.8 ft) in height and has a rhizome of up to 40 mm (1.6 in) in diameter. The long, sausage-like flower spikes are between 300–500 mm (12–20 in) in length.

== Taxonomy ==
The species was first described by Carl Borivoj Presl in the Epimeliae Botanicae in 1851.

== Etymology ==
The species epithet orientalis refers to the species being found in East Asia. The plant's Māori name, raupō, is a word used in different Polynesian languages to describe bulrushes.

== Distribution ==
The species is found across East Asia, Southeast Asia, Australia and New Zealand. The plant was introduced to the Chatham Islands of New Zealand by Māori.

== Uses ==
Known as raupō in New Zealand, the plant was quite useful to Māori. The rhizomes were cooked and eaten, while the pollen was collected and baked into cakes known as pungapunga. The leaves were used for roofs and walls and occasionally for canoe sails, as well as a material for making kites. Many of the first shelters constructed for European settlers in the 19th century were made from raupō.

== Gallery ==
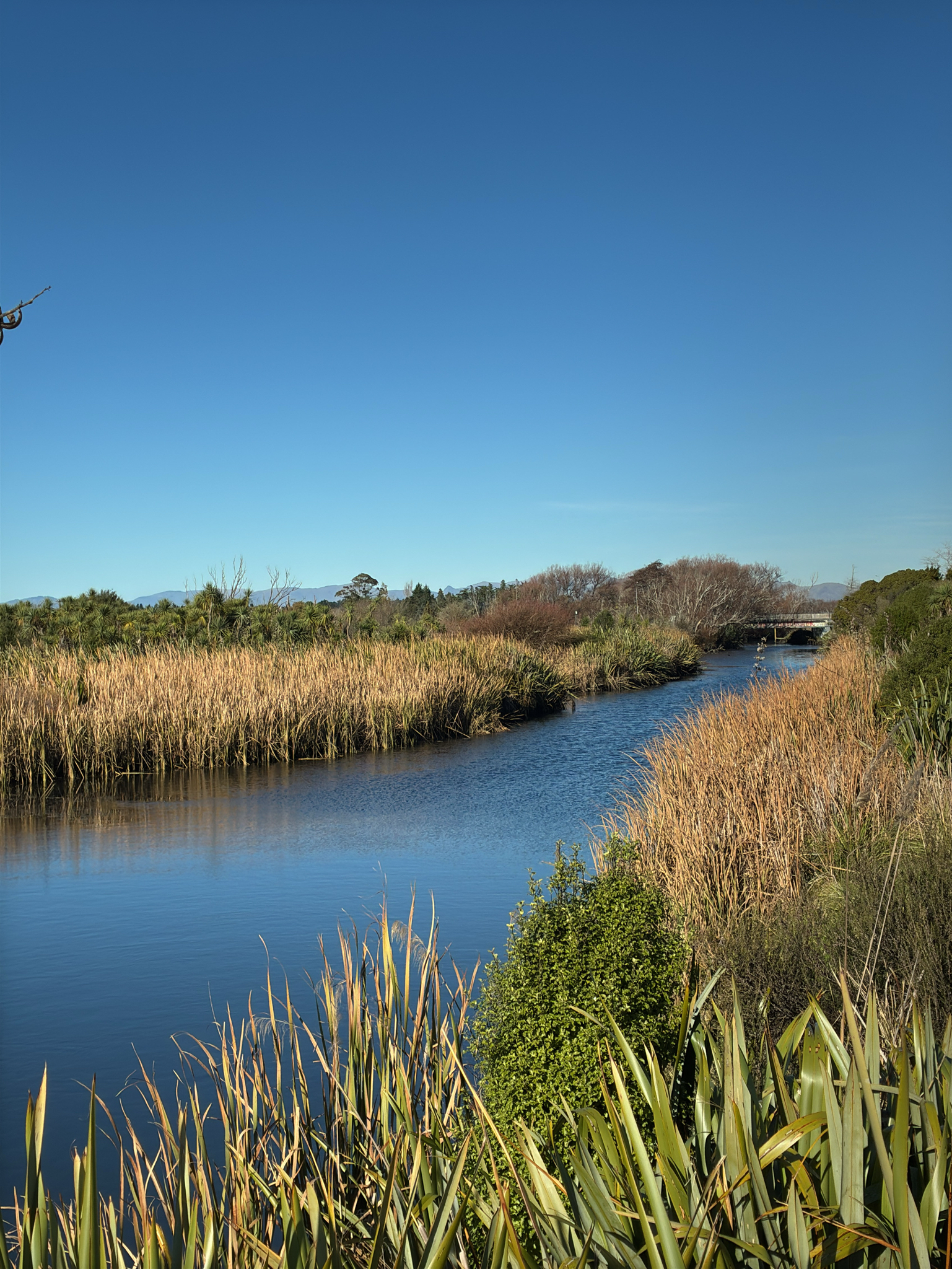
Typha orientalis typically grows in wetlands, such as in the Brooklands Lagoon along the Styx River in Christchurch, New Zealand

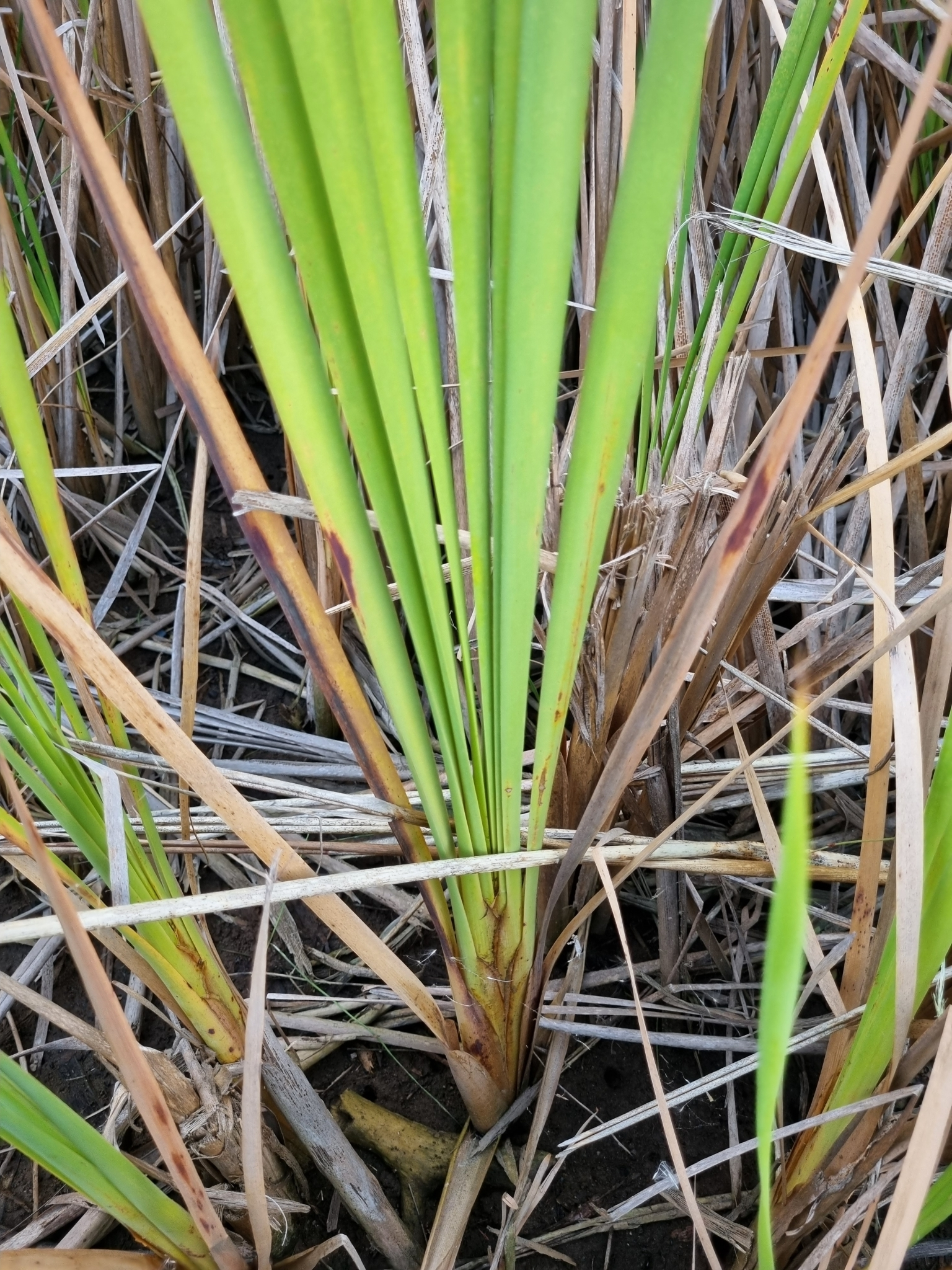
Leaves of Typha orientalis

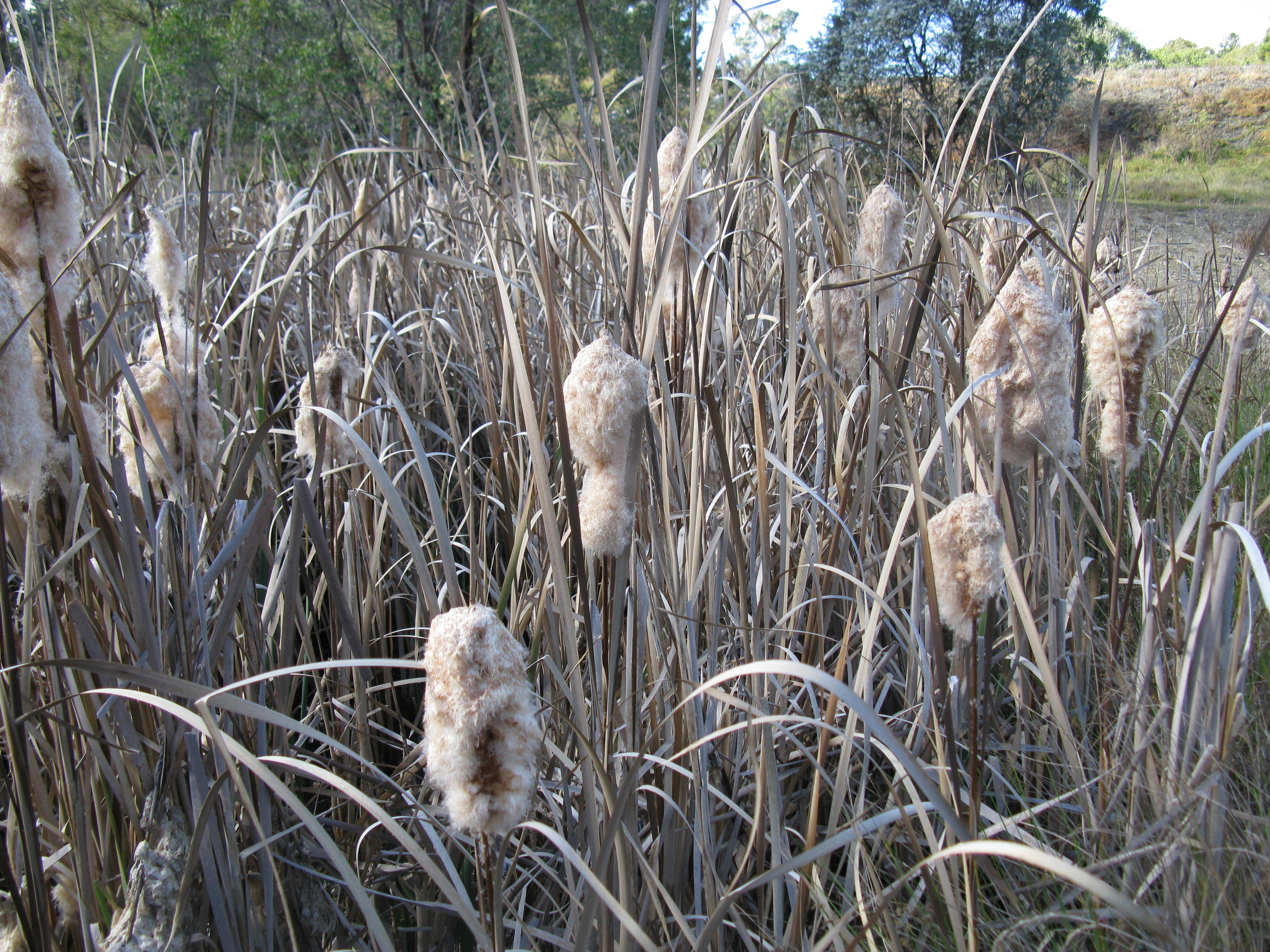
Flower head after bursting open to disperse seeds

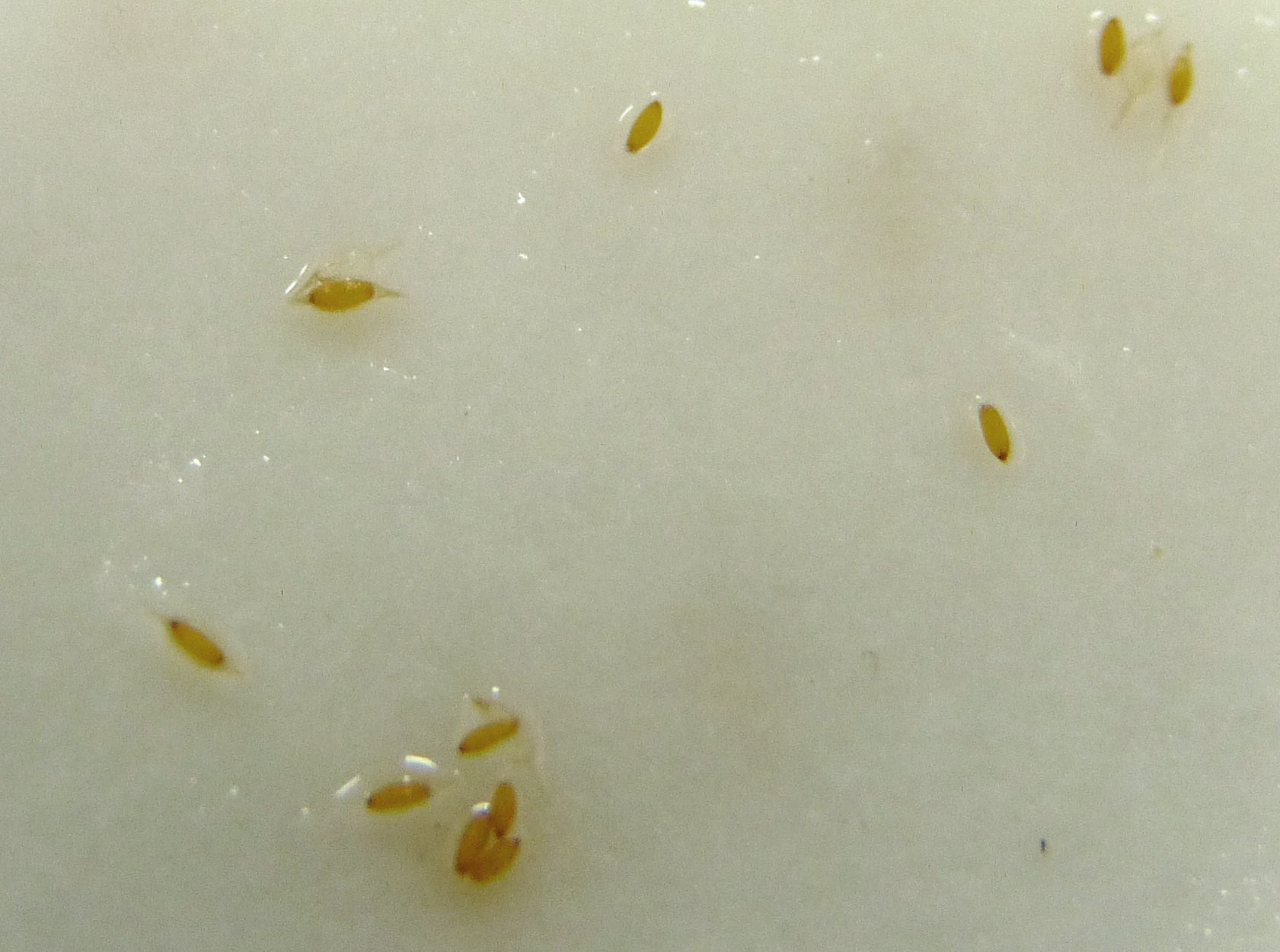
Seeds

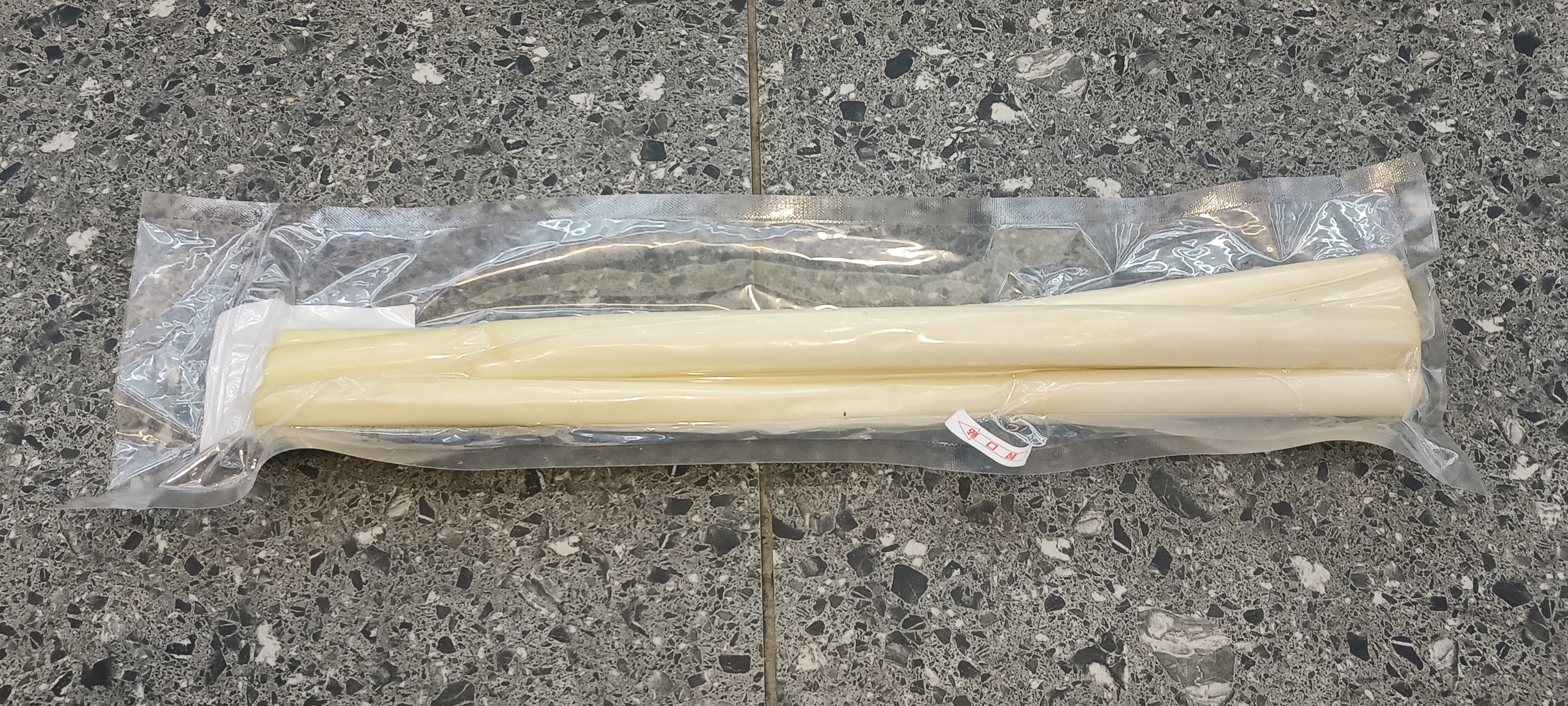
Pickled Typha orientalis rhizome sold in China
