= Wungong, Western Australia =

Wungong
- Suburb
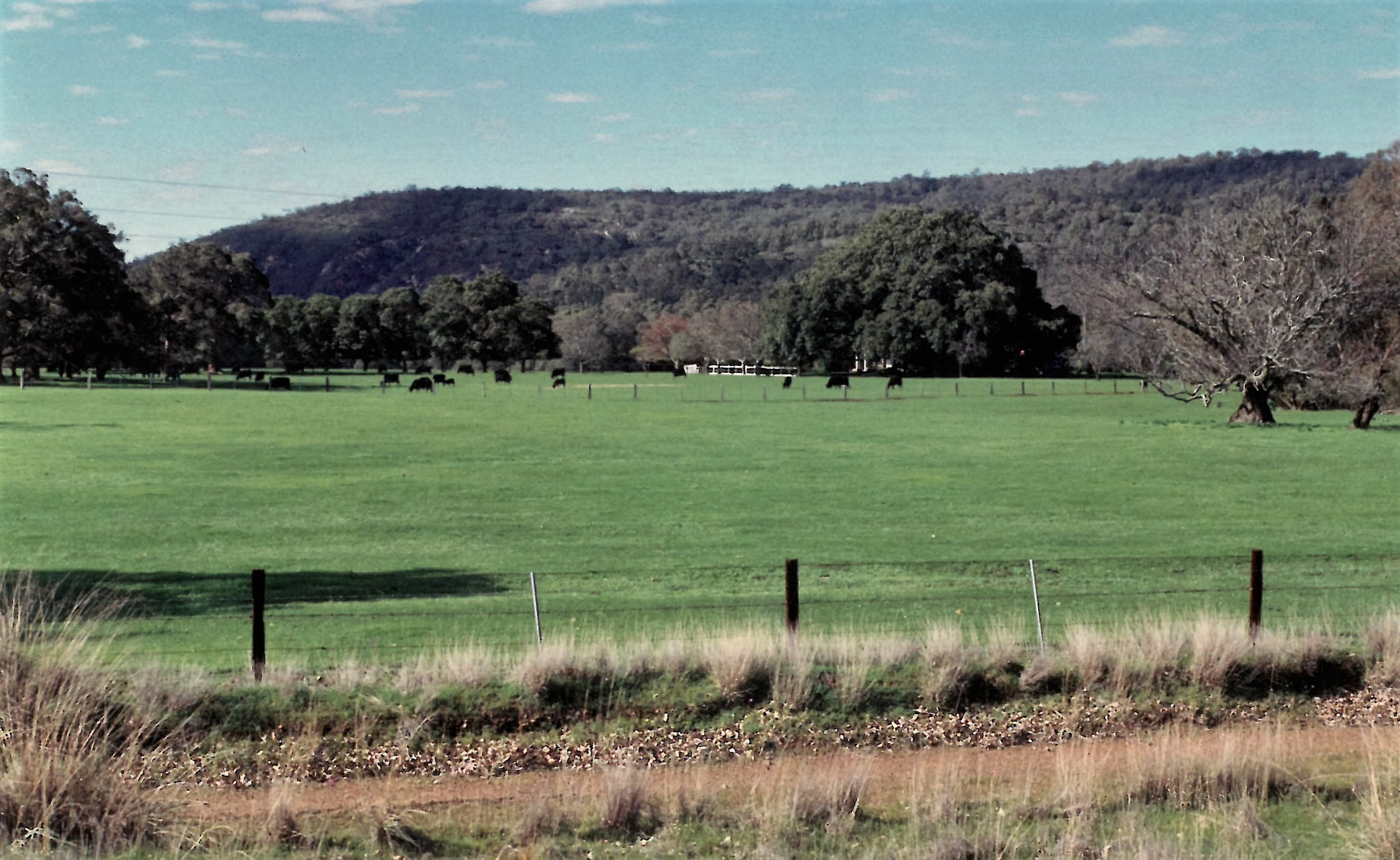
- View over Wongong Farm, from the railway, prior to subdivision. (1994)
- Interactive map of Wungong
- Coordinates: 32.182°S 116.012°E
- Country: Australia
- State: Western Australia
- City: Perth
- LGA: City of Armadale
- Location: 32 km (20 mi) from Perth; 4 km (2.5 mi) S of Armadale

Government
  - State electorate: Armadale
  - Federal division: Burt Canning

Area
  - Total: 4.3 km^{2} (1.7 sq mi)

Population
  - Total: 370 (SAL 2021)
- Postcode: 6112
Suburbs around Wungong
Brookdale	Armadale	Mount Richon
Hilbert	Wungong	Bedfordale
Darling Downs	Byford	Bedfordale

Wungong (older spelling Wongong), pronounced /wuːŋɡɒŋ/ is a semi-rural south-eastern suburb of Perth, Western Australia, located midway between Armadale and Byford and located in the local government area of the City of Armadale.

== History ==
=== Colonial period ===
The first survey in this area was by Alfred Hillman in January 1835. Hillman named the perennial stream that flows through the district the ‘Marshall River’ after Captain Marshall MacDermott who was a prominent figure in the Swan River Colony during its earliest years, but this name did not gain hold.

The earliest documented use of the suburb's name is in J W Gregory's survey of Canning Location 22 dated April 1844 which maps the course of the 'Woongan River' for the first kilometre west of the hills and shows the land selected by G & J Armstrong which they developed into what became known as 'Wongong' farm. The name, Aboriginal in origin, is said to mean "embracing" in the Nyungar language and derives from the manner in which the north and south branches of Wungong Brook clasp the parcel of land that was the centre of the Armstrong's farm. In the early years of the Colony maps identified the watercourse as the 'Woongan' River or Brook (the latter becoming the more prevalent), but within the span of a few decades the most consistent spelling for the farm became 'Wongong' and this variant was also applied to the railway stop established there when the South Western Railway was constructed in late 1892. The railways continued to use this name until 1949. In 1909, a new variant of the name was introduced when the Crown offered land near the railway for sale as lots in the 'Wungong Townsite'; however, this variant did not receive wider use after 1949, when it was applied to the railway stop. The new spelling would have been further reinforced when in 1957 the northern section of Rowley Road was renamed 'Wungong Road'. It has been claimed that the Government's introduction of Wungong (with a 'u') was intended to more clearly distinguish this district from Wongan Hills. But, despite the efforts of the government, many residents clung to the old spelling.

=== Wider settlement and consolidation ===
Until around 1900, settlement in the district was more or less limited to Wongong farm, an adjoining property owned by Claude Marsh, Edward Gibbs's smallholding in the hills named 'Cooliabbera' and Walter Butcher's property at Upper Wongong (situated in wide section of the gorge where the Admiral Road reserve crosses). Nearby settlement included the Saw's property south of Armadale and properties in the Byford (then Beenyup) area.

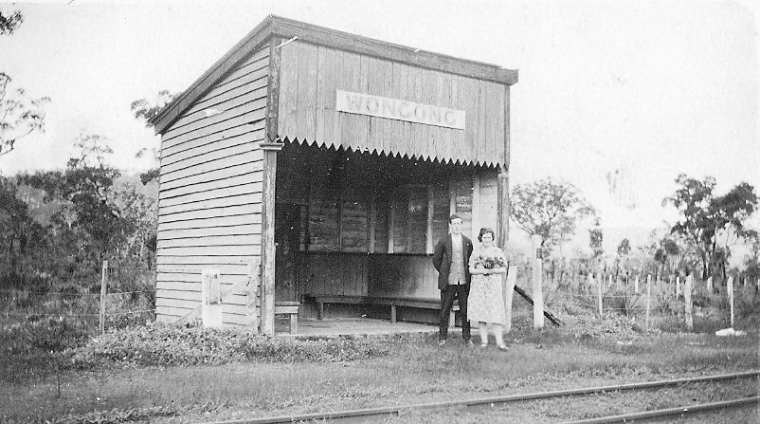
Wongong railway station, circa 1935 (State Library of Western Australia, B3524139_9)

The South Western Railway was constructed through Wongong in late 1892, and a stop was created at the northern boundary of Wongong farm from where milk was picked up and children from the farm boarded to travel to the school in Armadale. In 1910 the stop was moved to higher ground 600 metres northwards because in frosty conditions it was difficult to get the south-bound train moving uphill. The stop existed until 1969, and comprised a siding (removed 1954), weatherboard shelter, and stock pens. Its removal probably coincided with the creation of a cutting to eliminate the gradient.

In the 1890s, the sale of a vast tract of undeveloped land owned by Samuel Hamersley (also owner, for a time, of Wongong farm) and its subsequent subdivision by an Eastern States speculator named Goss opened up the area with a patchwork of small rural lots averaging some 60 acres (24 ha) apiece. Provision was made for a township, and the Wungong townsite was gazetted on 12 March 1909; although it was not subsequently developed. By this time, many of these properties had been taken up by settlers, a number of whom had migrated from the United Kingdom.

Opening of the Wongong hall, 1913 (Birtwistle Local Studies Library)

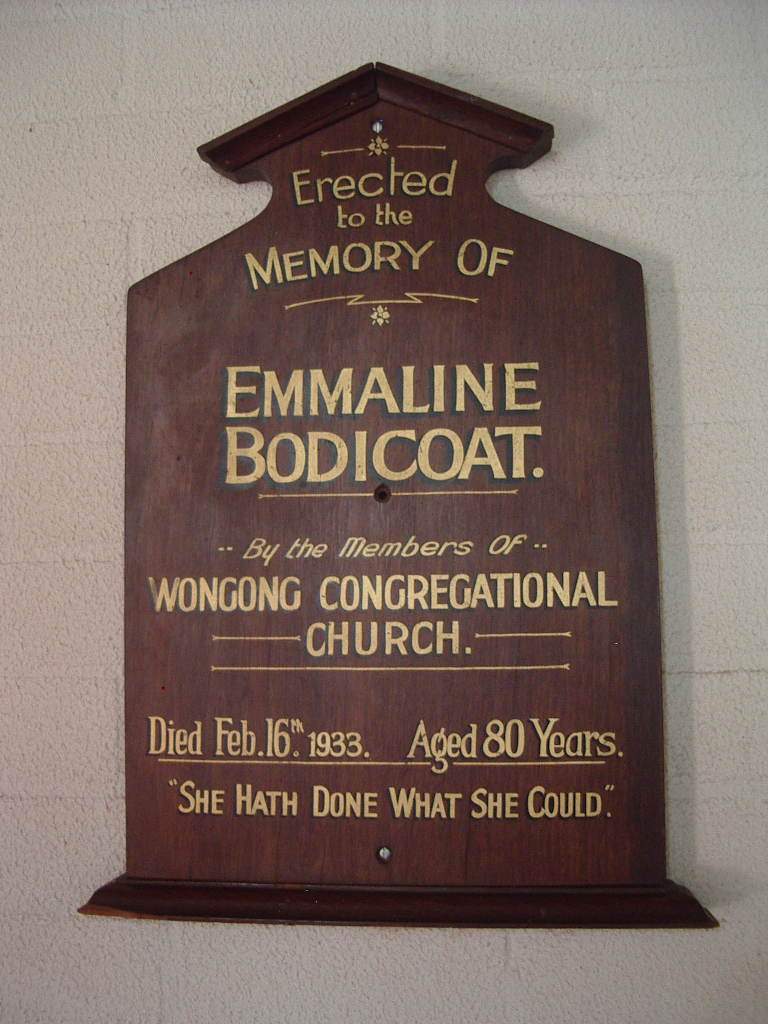
Memorial board for Emmaline 'Granny' Bodicoat, district midwife, which originally hung in the Wongong hall.

Settlement in the area was particularly concentrated within a radius of 1 kilometre (0.62 mi) of the intersection of Eleventh Road and Wungong Road (Wungong Road being known as 'Rowley Road' at that time), an intersection that came to be known as 'Bodicoat's Corner' after the couple who occupied the cottage on the north side of the intersection. Names of other early families included Cockshott, Hilbert, Sermon, Marsh, Billingham, Whiteley, Cassell, Dutton, Smith, Aitkin, Mills, Baggs, Grafham, Henderson and Wheeler. These settlers formed a community and took the initiative to erect a hall on Eleventh Road, 400 metres (440 yd) north of Bodicoat's Corner (at the intersection with Rowley Road). The land was donated by Dutton. It was vested in the Congregational Union of Australia and formally known as the 'Wongong Congregational Mission Hall'. This hall was the centre of community activities for the next 50 years. In the early 1950s, while for a time disused by the Congregationalists, it was hired by the fledgling Free Reformed Church for their worship services, Bible study evenings and, in 1954, as the venue for the first synod of the Free Reformed Churches of Australia. Over the years, the hall served as a venue for various religious and secular festivities (but not dancing), weddings, a meeting venue for the local Progress Association, a polling place for elections, and even for a short time as an overflow classroom for the Armadale Senior High School. By the early 1960s, the hall had fallen into disuse and in 1963 it was dismantled and relocated to Roleystone. A concrete pad and steps remained on the site until around 2013 when the steps were relocated to the grounds of the newly opened Free Reformed Church of Darling Downs, on the corner of Rowley Road and Masters Road. The site continues to have social significance to many local residents.

=== Upper Wongong ===
During the 1890s, a number of settlers became established in the hills along the valley of the Wongong Brook. The most prominent of these settlers was Walter Butcher who built up a productive farm downstream from the present location of Wungong Dam. Areas cleared for pasture land, introduced trees and some artifacts of Butcher's farm are still extant, as are remnants of a government-built timber bridge where the Admiral Road reservation - which passed through his farmyard - fords the river. The construction of Wungong Dam, which was completed in [1975-1979], obliterated a number of small holdings in this 'Upper Wongong' district. Other small holdings were cleared away to create the water catchment area for Wungong Dam.

Building of the Wungong Dam was preceded in 1925 by the construction of a small pipehead dam on the brook, part of the 'Hills Scheme' which was intended to supplement the growing water needs of the Perth metropolitan area by means of constructing three reservoirs and three pipehead dams. The Wungong Brook Pipehead Dam supplied up to 32,000 kilolitres a day, more than either the Churchman Brook Dam or Victoria Reservoir. Soon after the pipehead dam was built, plans were prepared for a larger dam on the site but were put aside when in the 1930s it was decided to build the Canning Dam. Construction of Wungong Dam finally commenced in 1975, and the completed dam was opened in 1979. It has a capacity of 60 million kilolitres and, when full, its storage area covers 30 hectares stretching 5.8 kilometres back from the dam wall. Water from the dam is supplied by means of a steel pipe laid through the Wungong Gorge, although provision for an alternative supply route was made during the 1980s by creation of the Wungong Tunnel which runs underground from just west of Wungong Dam through to Rails Crescent on the western slope of the Darling Scarp.

=== 20th century to present ===
In the early years of the 20th century there were a number of areas near the railway from which gravel was excavated, and some of the diggings are still evident on the south side of the South Western Railway between Moore Street and Eleventh Road. The largest excavation was in the Wungong town reserve, but already by the 1920s this was filled with water and occasionally used by local youths as a swimming hole. In the 1950s, prior to the establishment of the City of Armadale's Hopkinson Road tip, it was used as a rubbish dump. For many years after this use ceased, the reserve was still an informal dumping ground for rubbish. The reserve also contained surviving native flora. Locals recall it also being used as a gathering place for Guy Fawkes fireworks nights in the 1950s, and during the 1980s its network of tracks were being used by a local horse trainer and by youths on motorbikes or in old cars. The former townsite is now fenced, cleared of most rubbish, and designated as the Lambert Lane Nature Reserve.

== Features and attractions ==
=== Fletcher Park ===
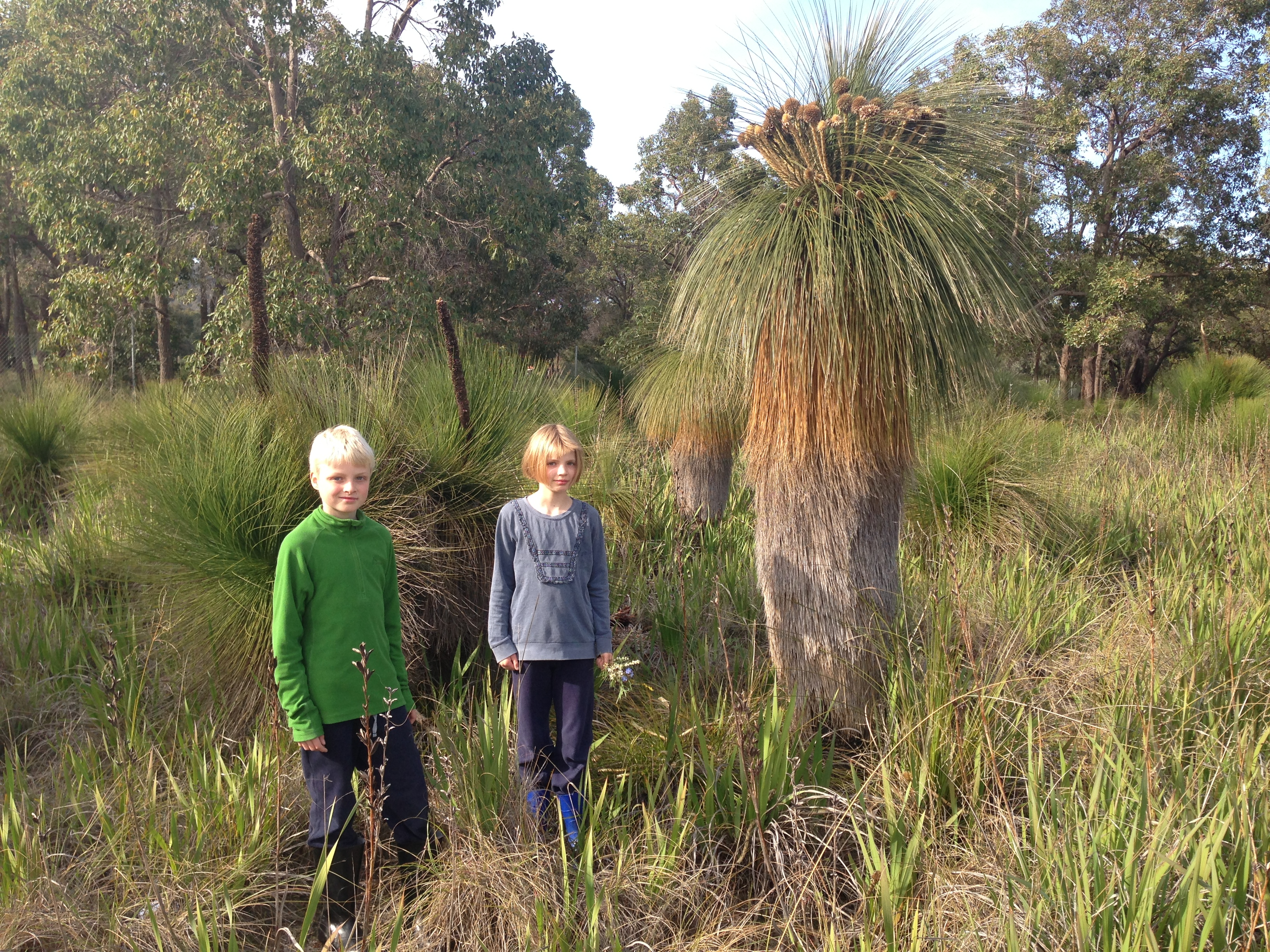
Grass trees in Fletcher Park. (2015)

Bushland on the east side of the South Western Railway, opposite the townsite reserve and extending from the former Stone Street reserve to Eleventh Road, is a 19 hectares (47 acres) reserve named Fletcher Park. This reserve has the Cooliabbera Creek running along its north-eastern boundary and is characterized by open forest of marri (Corymbia calophylla) and dense shrubbery dominated by grass trees (Xanthorrhoea preissii and Kingia australis). The Western Australian Christmas tree (Nuytsia floribunda) also occurs in this area. From 1980, the 10 acres (4.0 ha) area through which the creek flows has been leased to the Wallangara Riding and Pony Club which has developed an arena, bridle trails, jumps and clubroom facilities on the site.

=== Wongong Brook ===
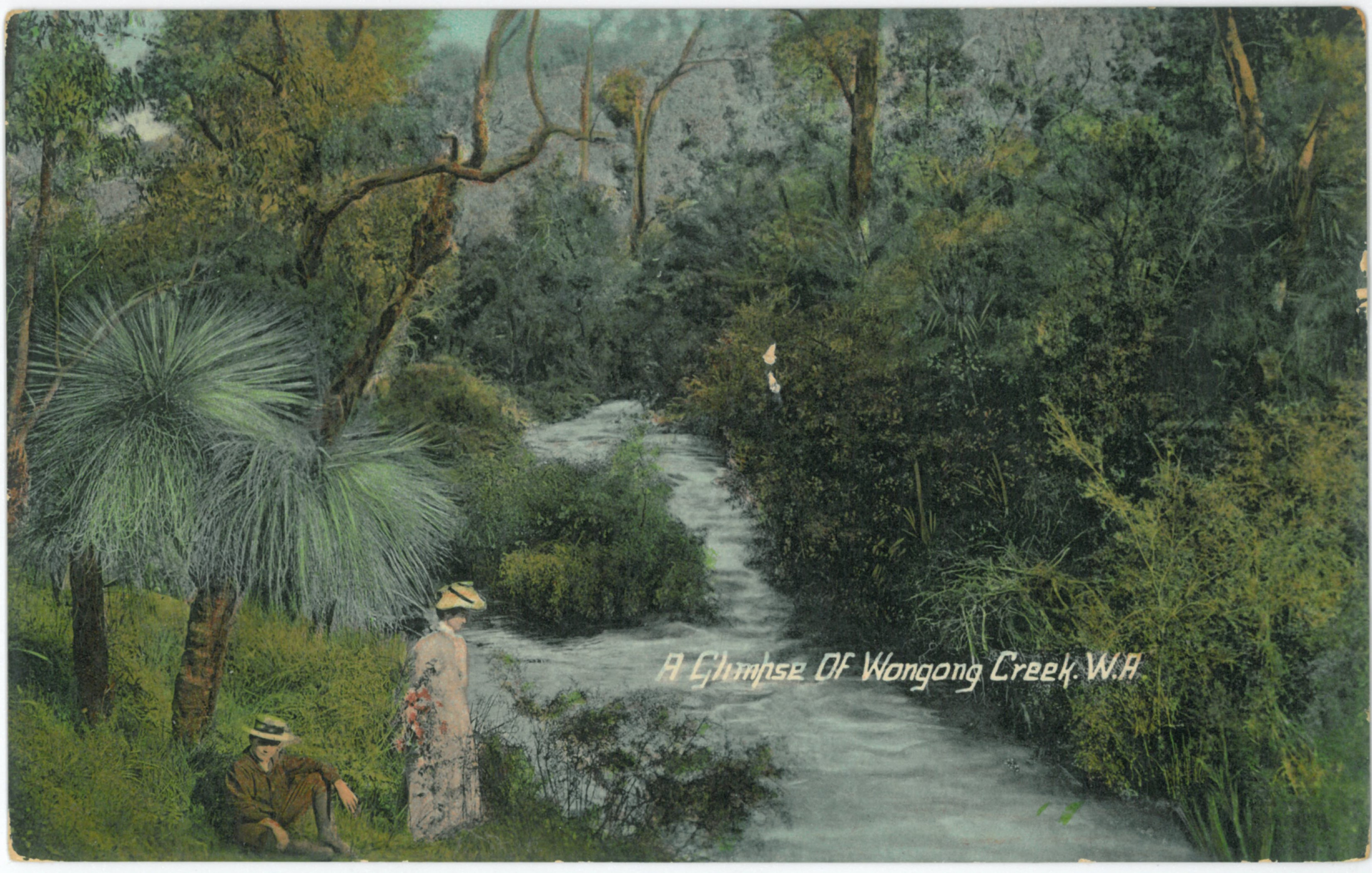
Postcard (c.1908) showing the area near the South-Western Highway that was a popular picnic destination.

Wongong Brook has for long been a place of recreation. In the earliest years of motor cars, the brook in the vicinity of the South Western Highway was well known a picnic destination. A number of postcards portraying the brook in its bushland setting were produced at this time. Generations of local children have paddled and swum in the deeper sections of the brook, navigated sections in small boats and home-made canoes, and caught marron and gilgies in its waters.

=== Wongong Gorge, Bungendore Park, and Wungong Regional Park ===
The Wongong Gorge and the hills which form a backdrop to the district have been favoured by bushwalkers, including local residents. A great deal of bushland has been preserved in the hills east of Wongong, a significant area of which is Bungendore Park. The Park's core was a reserve gazetted in 1897 for the purpose of timber harvesting. Not long after, in 1908, the reserve was re-designated as 'parklands'. In 1965 it was vested in the Armadale-Kelmscott Shire Council, and in 1973 was named 'Bungendore Park'. Other areas have subsequently been added to this Park: today it comprises 498 hectares (1,230 acres). It is now regarded as a preserve of bushland of regional importance within the Darling Range Regional Park. The Wongong Gorge is outside of the bounds of Bungendore Park, but together with several other large areas of local bushland it forms the Wungong Regional Park - a management area created in 2008. As many as 351 plant species and 131 vertebrate fauna species have been identified as potentially occurring in Bungendore Park.

=== Armadale Reptile and Wildlife Centre ===
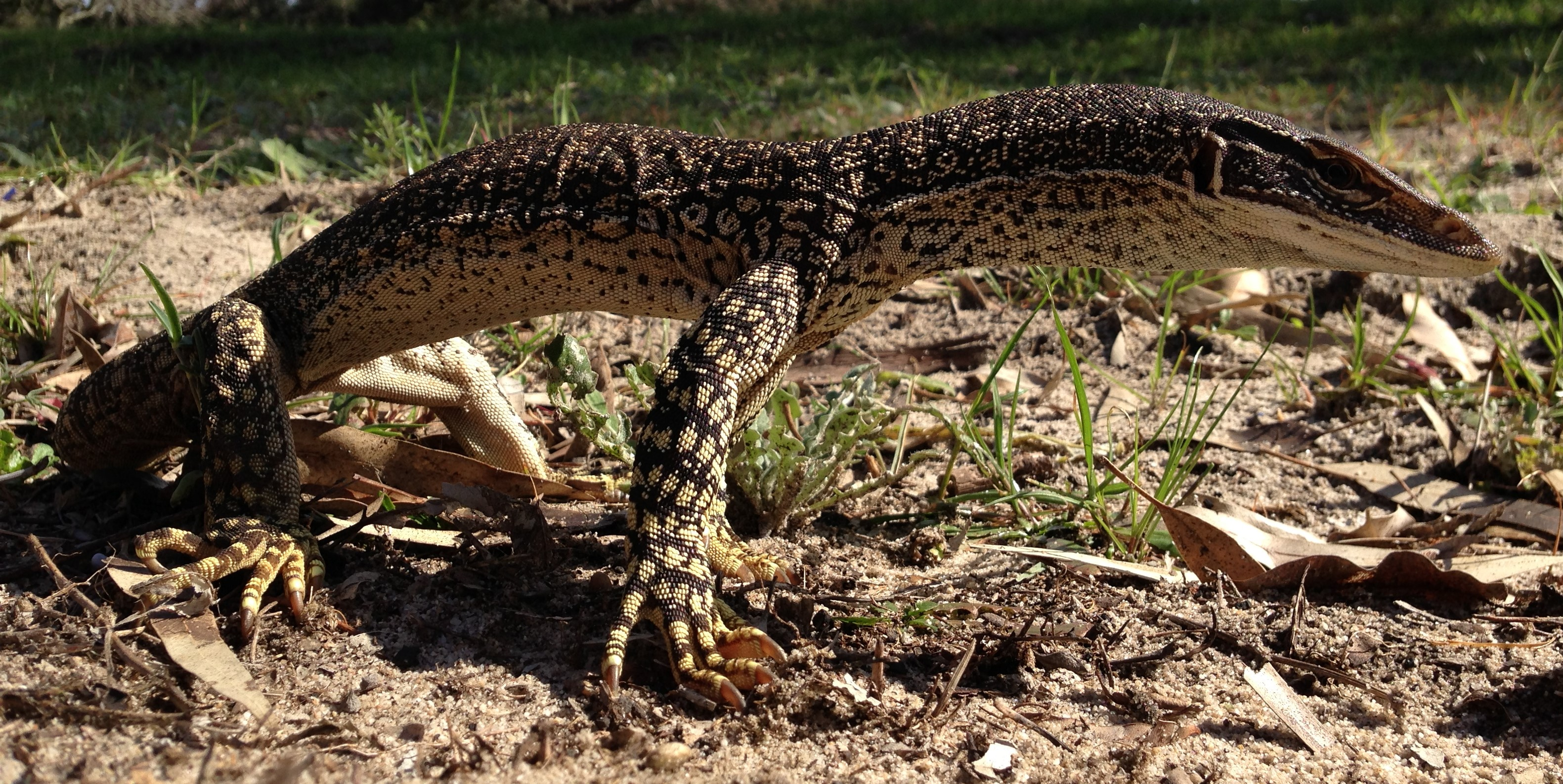
A goanna, observed in the wild near the site of the Wongong hall. (2015)

A private wildlife sanctuary named ‘Armadale Reptile and Wildlife Centre' was opened on the South-Western Highway in Wongong in 1995 by the Gaikhorst family and has the largest public reptile and amphibian display in Western Australia. Other animals on display include dingoes, flying foxes, farm animals marsupials and birds.

== Places of natural and historical interest ==
- Wongong farm [homestead (1918), cottage (c.1890), out-buildings, early plantings & cultural landscape (1844), early farm infrastructure, archaeology]
- South Western Highway [old coaching road to Bunbury, remnants of bridges over the Wongong and site of an early picnic and camping place on the Wongong Brook]
- Waterway [late 20th century model farm and art studio/gallery complex (1965) incorporating land that was at one time known as Westminster orchard (c.1930)]
- Butcher farm, Upper Wongong [remnants of homestead and farm infrastructure including waterwheel, remnants of government bridge in Admiral Road reservation, early plantings & cultural landscape (c.1890)]
- Wungong dam and tunnel [one of the Perth region's most substantial water reservoirs (1979), site of an early pipehead dam which supplied the metropolitan area, and structures of engineering significance]
- Bungendore Park and Wongong Gorge [bushland of high conservation value parts of which have been parkland since 1908, evidence of 19th century gold mining, mid-20th century gravel extraction, and late 20th century granite quarrying]
- Cooliabbera [stone ruins (c.1870), early plantings, archaeological site; a place that has associations with the artist May Gibbs]
- Ley's house [stone house (c.1910) on the brow of the 'middle hill', overlooking Wongong]
- McCarthy's bare patch [a large clearing on western slope of the Mt Richon subdivision which until the 1990s was a landmark visible from Kings Park but which is now gradually disappearing due to the establishment of suburban gardens]
- Richon Vineyards [archaeological remains of cellars (c.1905-1988), remnant infrastructure (dams, drystone walls, culvert)]
- Deadman's Gully [natural feature associated with legend of coaching accident]
- Railway reserve including the Wongong station site, railway (1892), Fletcher Park, and Lambert Lane Nature Reserve: bushland of high conservation value, archaeological remains of gravel extraction (c.1910-1920], other archaeological remains]
- Bodicoat's corner [intersection of Wungong and Eleventh Roads, the genius loci of the small holdings west of the railway line and place of residence for the district midwife, 'Granny Bodicoat' (c.1910-c.1933)]
- Wongong Congregational Mission Hall [site of the hall that was the focal point of the district (1913-1963)]
- Marsh's house [brick bungalow (c.1890) which is the oldest continually occupied dwelling in Wongong west of the railway]
- Wongong Brook west of Rowley Road [parklands which include deep sections of the waterway that were mapped in the 1840s, and a popular swimming hole of the mid-20th century]

== Present day character ==
Wongong comprises three geographically distinct areas, the planning and development of which are markedly different in character. These areas comprise:

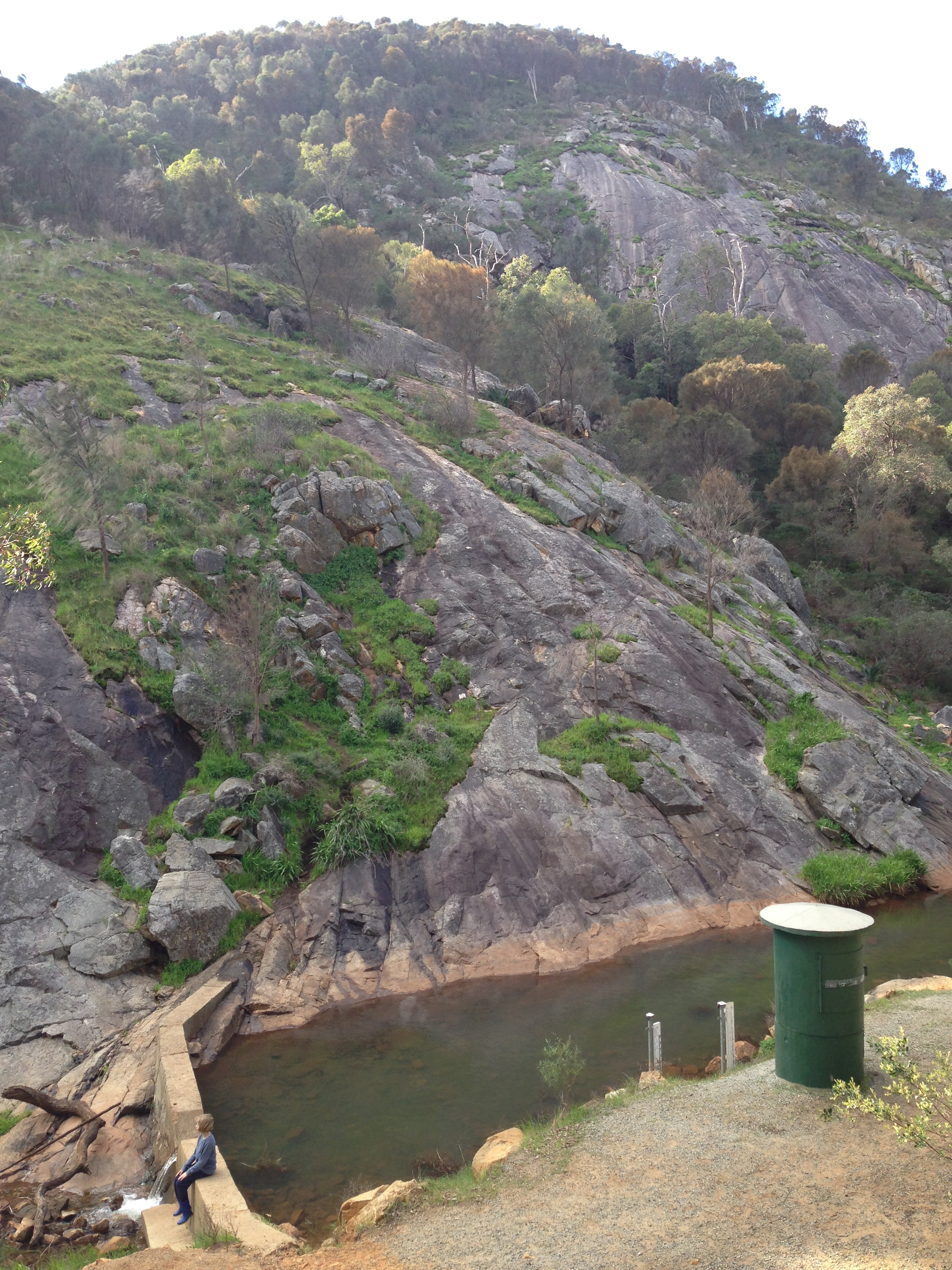
- Weir in the Wongong Gorge. The area in the background is part of Bungendore Park. (2015)
  the hills; including 'Upper Wungong' comprising regenerated bushland and semi-rural subdivisions.
- the corridor between the South Western Highway and the South Western Railway, south of Stone Street and north of Eleventh Road.
- the flats or plain west of the South Western Railway, bounded by Wungong Road and Rowley Road to the north, the land either side of Wungong Brook to the west, and Keenan Street to the south, where hobby farms predominate.

Historically, the flats west of the railway have, other than 'Wongong' farm, been an area of rural smallholdings. Some of these smallholdings survive in reduced form as blocks of up to 10 acres. However, from the late 1980s this area is progressively being transformed into suburbs of the Perth metropolitan area. The oldest of this suburban development is located immediately south of Gwynne Park (which for a long time defined the south-west limit of Armadale township), obliterating the old properties of 'Chinnor', 'Chiltern' and 'Trefoil Noir', as well as a few other smallholdings. The suburb in this area takes the name of Brookdale. When, in the 1990s, the Evelyn Gribble Community Centre was built, it was the only new development on the south-western side of Ninth Road. Suburban development is now infilling areas west of the Evelyn Gribble Centre and the planning of this suburban expansion is being managed by the Metropolitan Redevelopment Authority. Longer established community facilities and businesses in this area include the factory and retail outlet of Rose Valley Cheese Company (1977) on Wungong Road, the Seventh Day Adventist Church and School (c.1980, now known as Australian Christian College - Darling Downs) on Ninth Road near the corner of Wungong Road, and the retirement villas (c.1990) on Rowley Road west of Masters Road.

== Transport ==
=== Bus ===
- 249 Armadale Station to Hilbert – serves Wungong Road, Eleventh Road and Rowley Road
- 251 and 254 Armadale Station to Byford – serve South Western Highway
- 252 Armadale Station to Mundijong – serves South Western Highway
- 253 Armadale Station to Jarrahdale – serves South Western Highway
