= Wungong Tunnel =

Water tunnel in Perth, Western Australia

Coordinates: 32°11′01″S 116°01′13″E

- Interactive map of Wungong Tunnel

Overview
- Crosses: Darling Scarp

Operation
- Constructed: Clough; Codelfa; Cogefur
- Opened: 1982
- Owner: Water Corporation

Technical
- Length: 3.7 km (2.3 mi)

The Wungong Tunnel links the Wungong Dam to Perth, Western Australia's Integrated Water Supply System.

It originates just west of Wungong Dam and runs through the granite Darling Scarp to the western portal in Rails Crescent, Wungong. Built by a joint Venture of Clough, Codelfa and Cogefur, and with a length of 3.7 kilometres (2.3 mi), it opened in 1982.
