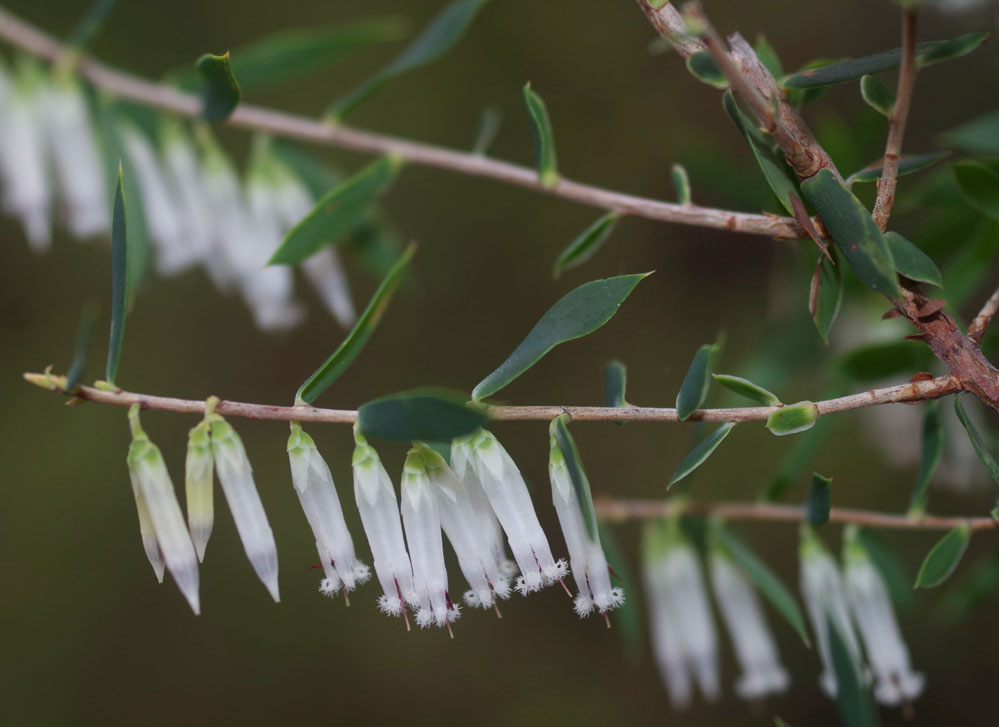
- In Bedfordale

Scientific classification
- Kingdom: Plantae
- Clade: Tracheophytes
- Clade: Angiosperms
- Clade: Eudicots
- Clade: Asterids
- Order: Ericales
- Family: Ericaceae
- Genus: Styphelia
- Species: S. nitens

Binomial name
- Styphelia nitens Sleumer
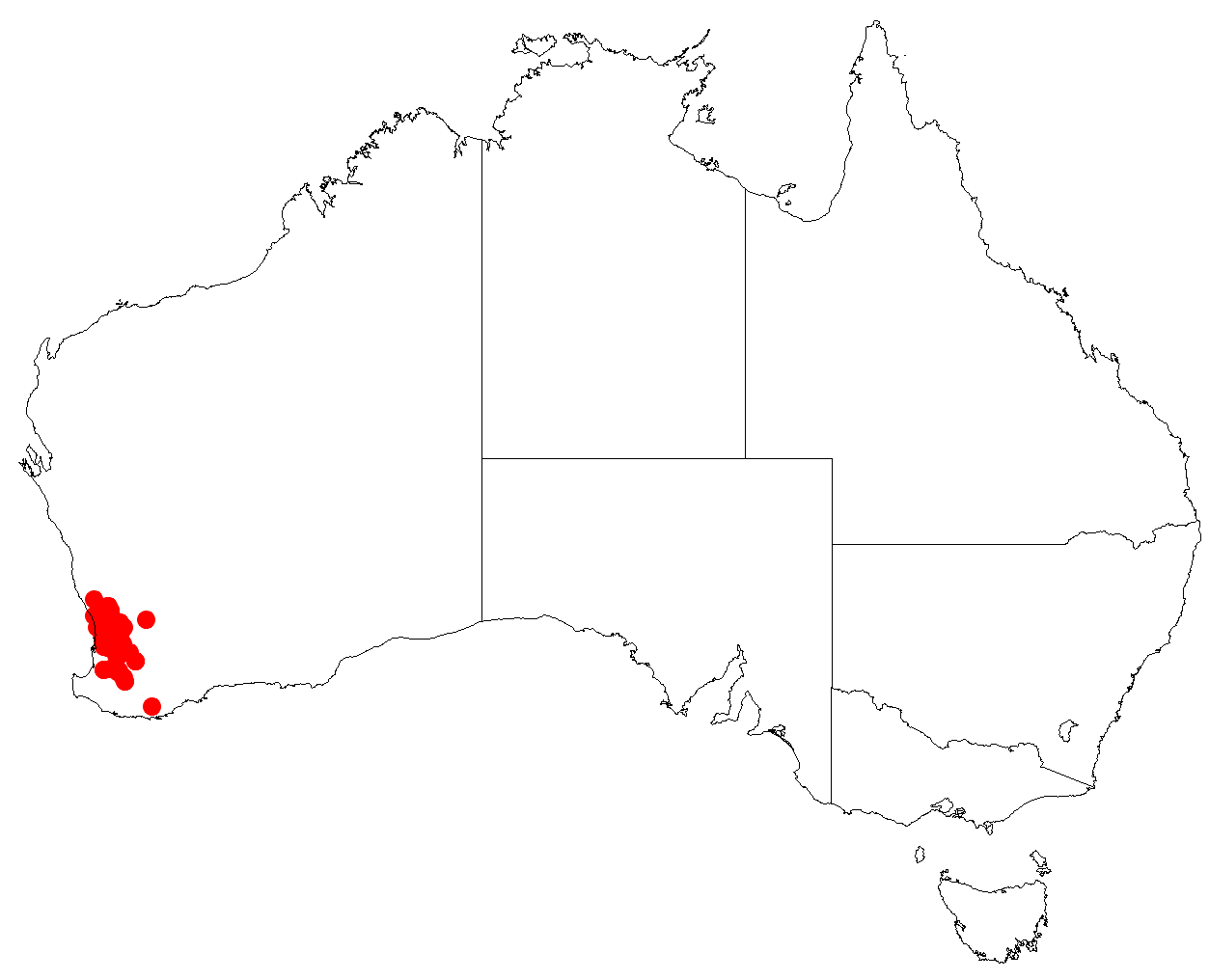
- Occurrence data from AVH

Synonyms
- Leucopogon nutans E.Pritz.

= Styphelia nitens =

Species of plant

Styphelia nitens is a species of flowering plant in the heath family Ericaceae and is endemic to the south-west of Western Australia. It is a shrub that was first formally described in 1904 by Ernst Georg Pritzel in Botanische Jahrbücher für Systematik, Pflanzengeschichte und Pflanzengeographie from specimens collected in Darlington (now a suburb of Perth). In 1964, Hermann Otto Sleumer transferred the species to Styphelia, but since the name S. nutans referred to a different species (now known as Trochocarpa nutans ) the new species was given the name S. nitens. The original specific epithet (nutans) means "nodding".

Styphelia nitens is found in the Avon Wheatbelt and Jarrah Forest bioregions of south-western Western Australia and is listed as "not threatened", by the Government of Western Australia Department of Biodiversity, Conservation and Attractions.
