= List of State Register of Heritage Places in the City of Gosnells =

The State Register of Heritage Places is maintained by the Heritage Council of Western Australia. As of 2026, 193 places are heritage-listed in the City of Gosnells, of which three are on the State Register of Heritage Places.

== List ==
The Western Australian State Register of Heritage Places, as of 2026, lists the following three state registered places within the City of Gosnells:

Place name	Place #	Location	Suburb or town	Co-ordinates	Built	State registered	Notes	Photo
Wilkinson Homestead	1127	Lot 101 Homestead Road	Gosnells	32°03′50″S 115°58′56″E	1912	26 February 1999	Also referred to as City of Gosnells Museum and Orange Tree Farm Museum; Constructed in the Federation Bungalow style	
Maddington Homestead	1132	Burslem Drive	Maddington	32°03′27″S 115°58′43″E	1836	21 September 2001	Also referred to as Maddington Park Homestead; A two-storey building constructed in the Georgian style	
Canning Contour Channel (former)	3709	Lot 50 Canning Mills Road	Kelmscott	32°07′23″S 116°04′57″E	1935	3 June 2005	Also referred to as Contour Channel/Fireplaces and Two Stone Chimneys; A series of concrete channels 16 km long; The only channel in Western Australia designed to transport large amounts of potable water by gravity whilst open to the elements; Also listed under the City of Armadale	
