= Canning Tunnel =

Tunnel in Western Australia

Coordinates: 32°07′46″S 116°03′38″E

The Canning Tunnel is a tunnel that originates just west of Canning Dam and runs for approximately 5.6 kilometres (3.5 mi) through the granite Darling Scarp to the western portal trunk main in Soldiers Road about 1 kilometre (0.62 mi) south of the Brookton Highway intersection. It measures 2.7 by 2.7 metres (8 ft 10 in × 8 ft 10 in). A separate 910-millimetre (36 in) pipeline from Canning Dam remains. The tunnel is more than 120 metres (390 ft) below ground level at its deepest point.

== History ==
The Canning Tunnel was constructed between 1973 and 1975 to link Canning Dam to Perth's Integrated Water Supply System. It was built to replace the Canning Contour Channel, which was a depression era public works project of the 1940s and constructed in conjunction with the opening of the dam.

110 men were employed in the first year of construction after which the workforce reduced to 60. The tunnel was built at a cost of A$3.5 million, equivalent to A$27.9 million in 2022, and was officially opened by Desmond Henry O'Neil, the Minister for Works, Water Supplies and Housing, on 17 January 1975.

The Canning Contour Channel was maintained and partially operated for two years after the tunnel's opening as a precautionary measure.
