= Mount Richon, Western Australia =

Mount Richon
- Suburb
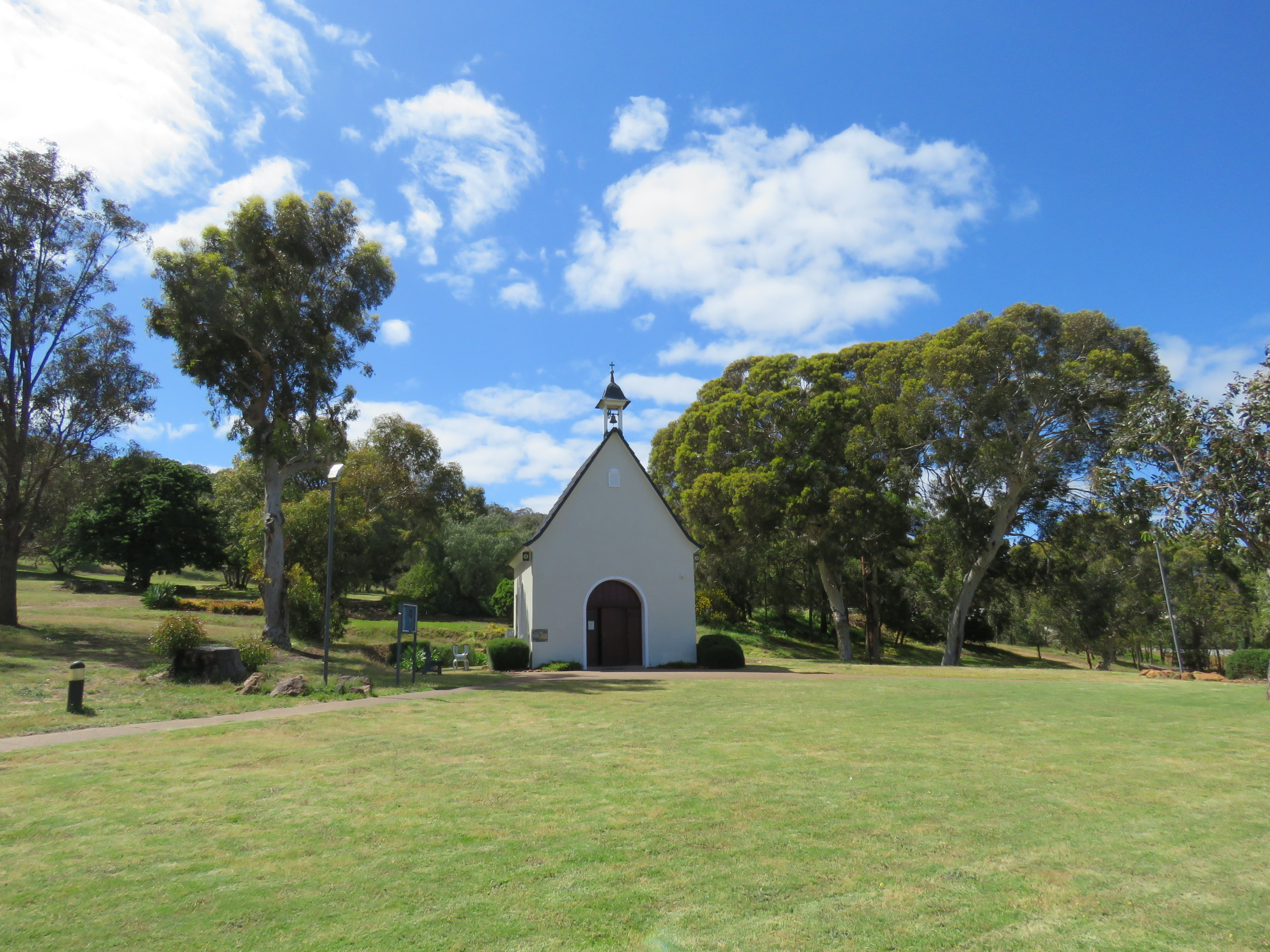
- The Schoenstatt Shrine in Mount Richon
- Interactive map of Mount Richon
- Coordinates: 32.161°S 116.02°E
- Country: Australia
- State: Western Australia
- City: Perth
- LGA: City of Armadale
- Location: 30 km (19 mi) SSE of Perth; 2 km (1.2 mi) SE of Armadale

Government
  - State electorate: Armadale
  - Federal division: Bullwinkel

Area
  - Total: 1.6 km^{2} (0.62 sq mi)

Population
  - Total: 2,067 (SAL 2021)
- Postcode: 6112
Suburbs around Mount Richon
| Armadale | Mount Nasura | Mount Nasura |
| Armadale | Mount Richon | Bedfordale |
| Wungong | Wungong | Bedfordale |

Mount Richon is a suburb of Perth, Western Australia in the City of Armadale. Formerly part of Armadale and Wungong, Mount Richon was approved as a suburb in 2003. It occupies the western slope of the Darling Range from the intersection of Albany and South Western Highways south to Leys Rise, is bounded on the west by South-Western Highway and is bounded on the east by Albany Highway and Bungendore Park. Mount Richon is named after a vineyard that formerly existed in the area.

== History ==
The major themes in the documented history of this suburb are as follows (in chronological order):

- Aboriginal occupation.
- Early exploration by European settlers.
- Early grants, two boundaries of which create the 'indent' on the eastern boundary of the Mount Richon suburb.
- Establishment of the W.A. Mining Company and the Colony's first mining venture (Cole's Shaft) in the late 1840s.
- Formation of the Albany and South Western Highways, and establishment of the Narrogin Inn.
- Dead Man's Gully and the associated legend.
- Establishment of the Armadale Brickworks, the associated extraction of shale from the escarpment and the extraordinary tramline operated by 'endless haulage gear'. Wood cutting by members of the Serls family and others and the consequent creation of Bedfordale Hill Road.
- Establishment of the Marian's Vineyard (aka Slavonian Vineyard), later renamed the Richon Vineyards by Gerald McCarthy who had served in Rishon Le Zion during World War I.
- Operation of granite quarry on the south side of the Albany Highway, east of the Narrogin Inn, in the 1920s.
- Closure of the Armadale Brickworks and shale quarry, and early suburban development on the escarpment above the Armadale town centre.
- Trouble with bushfires originating in Bedfordale (fanned by the Easterly Wind).
- Closure of the Richon Vineyards in the 1950s, removal of vines and gradual ruination of the cellars and homestead.
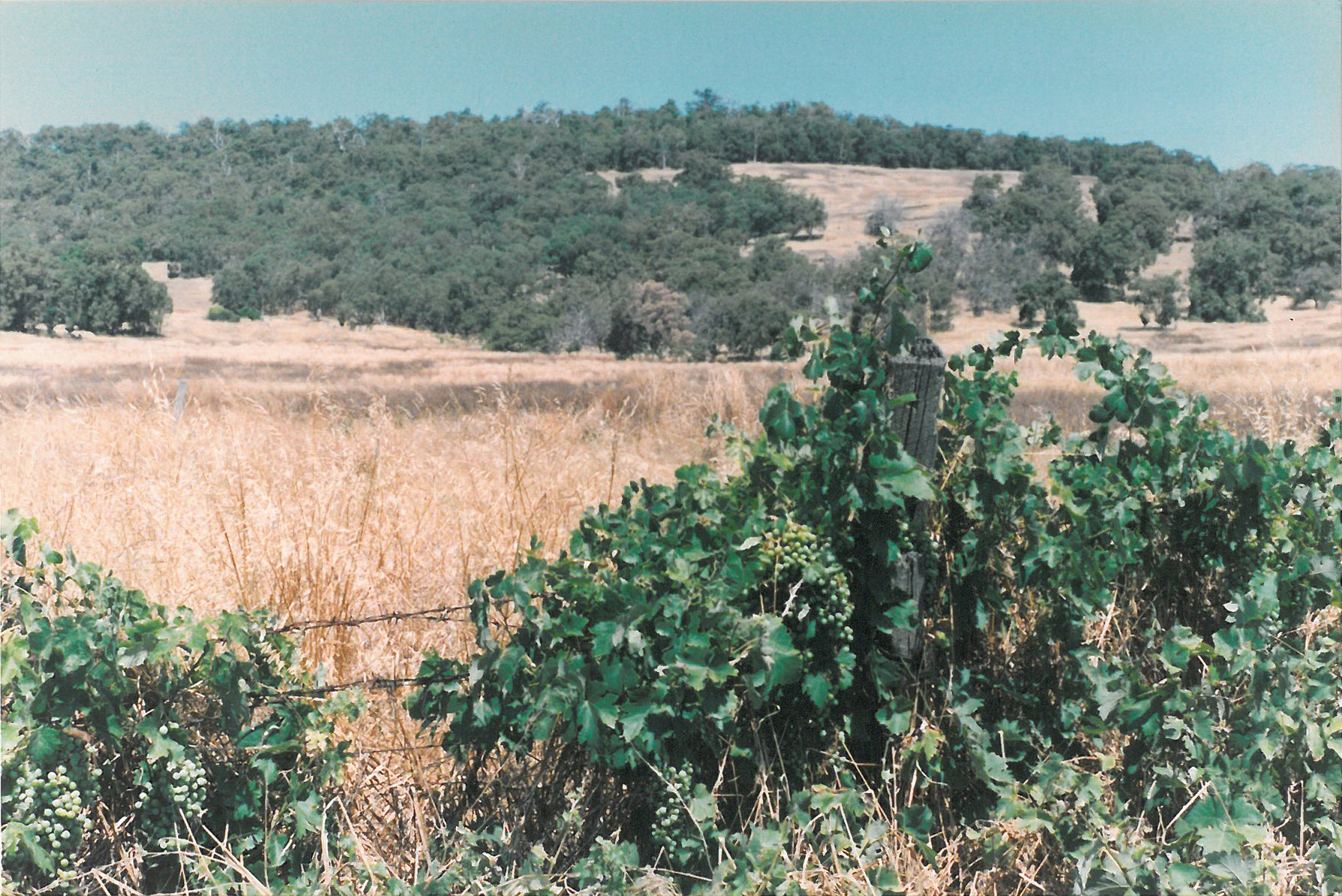
  Remnant vines growing along the South Western Highway in 1993
- Suburban development around Tredale Avenue consequent to the establishment of Armadale High School in 1957.
- Subdivision south of Tredale and the building of the Schoenstatt Shrine around 1990.
- Southward expansion: development of the caravan park, demolition of the derelict Richon Cellars in 1989 and subdivision of the former vineyard property in the early 1990s.

== Water courses ==
Four identifiable water courses pass through the suburb, and a fifth flanks the southern boundary.

The Neerigen Brook flows northwards alongside the Albany Highway from Bedfordale Hill Road to near the intersection of Carradine Road. It joins the Wungong Brook at the northern end of Twelfth Road in Westfield, the two brooks forming what is from that point named the Southern River - a major tributary of the Canning River. The Neerigen brook is seasonal by nature, but has at times been known to flow all year around.

An unnamed, seasonal stream originating from springs in the escarpment runs on the south side of the Schoenstatt Shrine and under the highway into the Armadale Brickworks site. This stream discharges into the Wungong Brook half a kilometre west of the intersection of Rowley and Eleventh Roads.

An unnamed, seasonal stream originating from springs on the escarpment forms a steep-sided ravine which passes under the South Western Highway between the caravan park and former vineyards. The ravine is known as 'Dead Man's Gully'. The lower course of the stream is indistinct, but passes under the South Western Railway just south of the crossing to Wungong Road, and from this point the stream joined its northern counterpart near Ninth Road and one kilometre south-east of this discharges into the Wungong Brook.

An unnamed winter brook originates from springs on the hillside in the lower northern corner of the area formerly known as McCarthy's bald patch, flowing down a shallow gully in the public open space alongside and above Chateau Court. Originally the gully took a broader profile in the present-day vicinity of Chateau Court and was filled in where the Richon Vineyard cellars were constructed (flows having been diverted around the southern side of the cellar building). The stream is not discernible west of the South Western Highway.

A seasonal stream originates at springs in Bungendore Park near the south-eastern corner of the suburb, and takes the name Cooliabbera Creek from the property on which the southern watershed is located. This creek flows out of a steep sided valley in the escarpment. It runs parallel to Leys Rise, just outside the southern boundary of the suburb, and joins the stream from Dead Man's Gully just north of the intersection of Eleventh and Rowley Roads, after which it discharges into the Wungong Brook.

== Flora and fauna ==
Much of the eastern boundary of Mount Richon adjoins parkland of regenerated bush, and some the more elevated parts of the suburb retain remnant native trees and understorey. Kangaroos, individual or in groups of up to twenty, are regular visitors to many of the properties in the suburb - attracted by the fresh greenery of the gardens. Smaller marsupials are also sometimes sighted. Pockets of bushland in this area provide habitat for a range of different lizards and snakes. Small freshwater crayfish, known locally as gilgies, are found in the Neerigen Brook. Birds frequenting this area include the kookaburra, magpie, mudlark, black crow, and several kinds of wrens. As many as 82 different species of birds have been sighted in the adjoining Bungendore Park.

== Present day character ==
The northern section of Mount Richon, north of the point where Hobbs Drive intersects Bedfordale Hill Road, contains suburban housing mostly of the 1960s through to the 1980s. Older housing, some as early as the 1930s, fronts onto the South-Western Highway. The disused shale quarry of the old Armadale Brickworks occupies a large area immediately north of Bedfordale Hill Road, and on the opposite side of Bedfordale Hill Road is a reserve named Tredale Park. The section immediately south of this, the arteries of which are Talus Drive and Rise Court, contain larger suburban lots (semi-rural) with housing stock mostly dating to the 1990s and the Schoenstatt Chapel. Immediately south of this is a caravan park, known as Hillside Garden Village. The southernmost area is that which was formerly the vineyard, bounded on the north by Deadman's Gully and on the south by Ley's Road. This area comprises suburban lots, those on the more elevated ground being larger and of a semi-rural character.

== Transport ==
=== Bus ===
251 from Armadale Station to Byford Station - Serves South Western Highway Operates hourly off peak and on weekends and every 30 minutes during Peak hour.

== Local nomenclature ==
The following are taken from the "Armadale road and locality names".

Aitken - A street name derived from the surname of a woman who was an early resident of Wongong.

Amethyst - A street name in the northern part of the suburb, being one of eight street names referencing precious or semi-precious stones. These names have no historical or geological significance to the location.

Beazley - A street name, based on the surname held by several prominent Western Australians including PWD architect Hillson Beazley and politician Kim Beazley.

Bedfordale - The name of the district immediately east of the Mount Richon suburb.

Billings - A street name derived from the surname of a family who were early residents of Armadale.

Burndale - A street name, the origin of which is obscure.

Breakneck Gully - The name of a steep ravine which is crossed by the South Western Highway, referencing an incident in which a horse rider was killed in the 19th century. The same gully is also named Dead Man's Gully.

Carrick - A street name, based on the surname of a young woman who came to the district as a teacher circa 1900, married and remained in the district.

Cellar - A street name within the area formerly occupied by the Richon Vineyards, located near (south-east of) the site of the vineyard's cellar building.

Chateau - A street name within the area formerly occupied by the Richon Vineyards. Chateau is a French term meaning a manor house and in the current context is an allusion to the wine-producing estates of the Bordeaux region which tend to use this term in their name.

Claret - A street name within the area formerly occupied by the Richon Vineyards, based on the name given to a red wine in the style of the Bordeaux.

Cooliabberra - A street name, based on the Aboriginal name given to the farming property in the valley immediately south-east of the suburb. A number of variants of this name exist, including 'Cooliabbera' and 'Cooliabra'.

Crystal - A street name in the northern part of the suburb, being one of eight street names referencing precious or semi-precious stones. These names have no historical or geological significance to the location.

Dead Man's Gully - The name of a steep ravine which is crossed by the South Western Highway, referencing an incident in which a horse rider was killed in the 19th century. The same gully is also named 'Breakneck Gully'.

Emerald - A street name in the northern part of the suburb, being one of eight street names referencing precious or semi-precious stones. These names have no historical or geological significance to the location.

Garnet - A street name in the northern part of the suburb, being one of eight street names referencing precious or semi-precious stones. These names have no historical or geological significance to the location.

Harrison - A street name, based on the surname of a family who were early residents of Armadale.

Hillside - A street name, based on the name of the small farm developed by Congregational lay-preacher Joseph Serls and his wife Mary on Albany Highway just south of the Bedfordale Hill Road intersection.

Jade - A street name in the northern part of the suburb, being one of eight street names referencing precious or semi-precious stones. These names have no historical or geological significance to the location.

Leys - A road name based on the surname of John Morgan Ley and Azelia Helena Ley (nee Manning) who owned the property at the crest of the escarpment to where the road bearing their name leads.

Marian's Vineyard - Not a current name in this locality, this was the original name given to the vineyard after which the suburb is named. In its early years, the vineyard was also referred to as the 'Slavonian vineyards'.

Marsh - A street name, based on the surname of a family who were residents of Bedfordale, Wongong and Armadale. Rod Marsh, the famous Western Australian cricketer, is a member of this family and spent part of his childhood in nearby William Street.

McCarthy's bald patch - A historical name for the large bare patch that until c.2005 was a landmark on the hillside above the South Armadale industrial area, visible from as far afield as Kings Park. The name is an allusion to the bald head of GVP McCarthy who for many years was the owner of the land and the vineyard below it. The patch was also known as 'McCarthy's bare patch'.

Onyx - A street name in the northern part of the suburb, being one of eight street names referencing precious or semi-precious stones. These names have no historical or geological significance to the location.

Opal - A street name in the northern part of the suburb, being one of eight street names referencing precious or semi-precious stones. These names have no historical or geological significance to the location.

Richon- A street name within the area formerly occupied by the Richon Vineyards. The name references 'Rishon LeZion' in Israel, a place with which the vineyard's second owner (GVP McCarthy) was personally acquainted. McCarthy also had a house in Cottesloe named 'Richon'.

Rise - A street name, referencing the elevated position of the street.

Sapphire - A street name in the northern part of the suburb, being one of eight street names referencing precious or semi-precious stones. These names have no historical or geological significance to the location.

Saw - A street name, based on the surname of Armadale's foremost pioneering family.

Summit - A street name, referencing the crest of the hill on which it is situated.

Talus - A street name, meaning ankle bone, which has no apparent local relevance.

Tredale - A street name that corresponded with the rail stop south of Armadale used by students of Armadale High School. For a time (1950s-70s), the south-eastern part of the Armadale township was known as Tredale.

Treecrest - A street name within the area formerly occupied by the Richon Vineyards, being a combination of tree and crest which is an allusion to the tree-crested escarpment of this locality.

Woodcroft - A street name within the area formerly occupied by the Richon Vineyards, being a combination of wood and croft but having no historical or geographical significance to the locality.
