= Kangaroo Gully catchment =

The Kangaroo Gully catchment is a small stream dam in the Canning Dam catchment. The water collected by the dam is transported to the Canning Dam via gravity feed along a small open channel, the Kangaroo Gully Contour Channel.
