= Churchman Brook Dam =

Dam in Western Australia

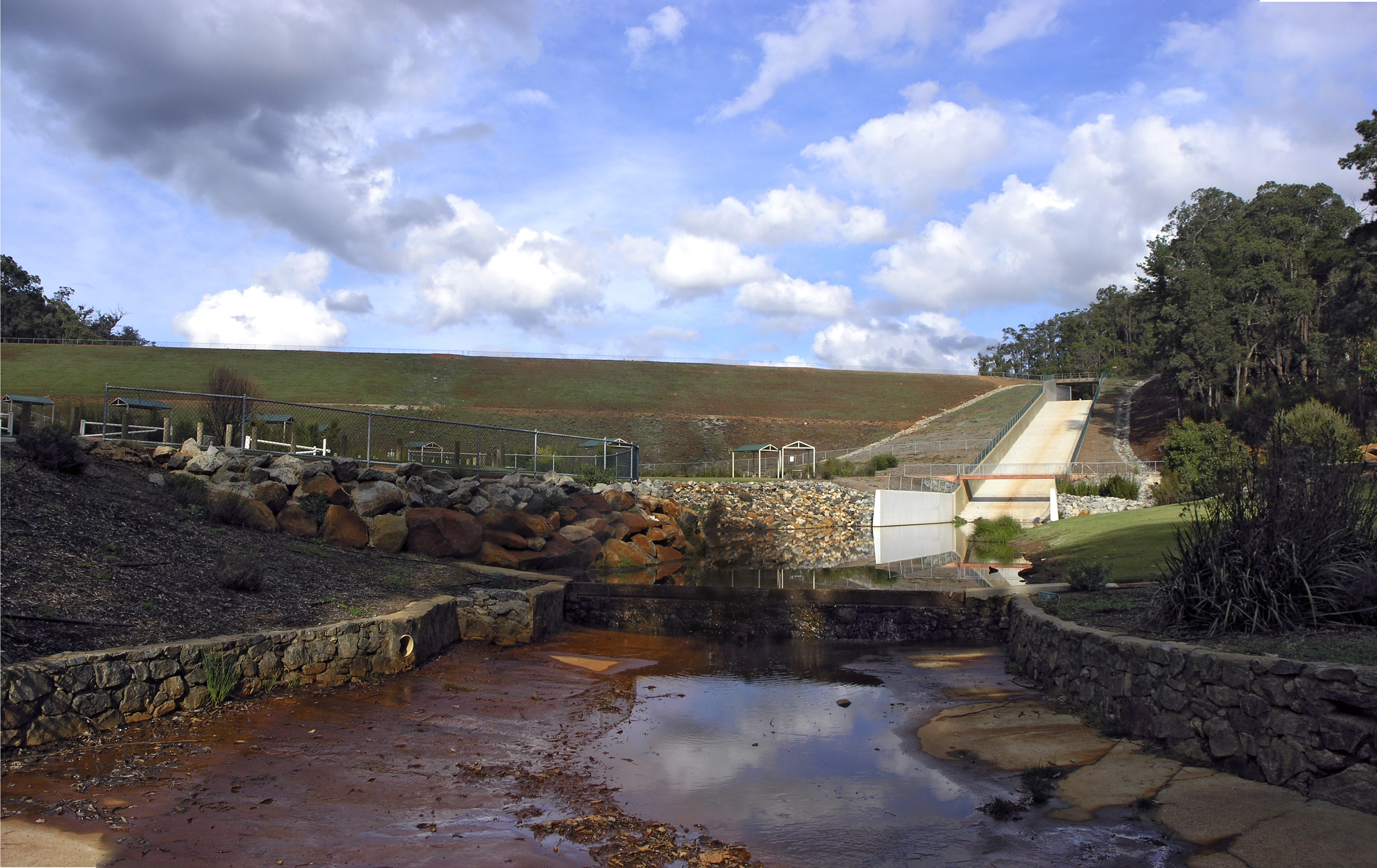
- The dam and the spillway

- Location of the dam in Western Australia
- Interactive map of Churchman Brook Dam
- Country: Australia
- Location: Bedfordale, City of Armadale, Darling Range, Western Australia
- Coordinates: 32°9′0.4″S 116°4′40.5″E
- Purpose: Potable water supply
- Status: Operational
- Construction began: 1923
- Opening date: 1929
- Designed by: Sir Russell John Dumas

Dam and spillways
- Type of dam: Embankment dam
- Impounds: Churchman Brook
- Height (foundation): 26 m (85 ft)
- Length: 231 m (758 ft)

Reservoir
- Total capacity: 2.24 GL (79,000,000 cu ft)
- Maximum length: 1.4 km (0.87 mi)

Western Australia Heritage Register
- Official name: Churchman Brook Dam
- Type: City of Armadale Municipal Inventory
- Designated: 1 December 2008
- Reference no.: 18961

The Churchman Brook Dam is an earth-fill embankment dam approximately 30 kilometres (20 mi) southeast of Perth, Western Australia in the City of Armadale. The reservoir serves as a source of potable water for Perth. The reservoir has a capacity of 2.24 gigalitres (79 million cubic feet) for a catchment area of 16 square kilometres (6.2 sq mi).

== Overview ==
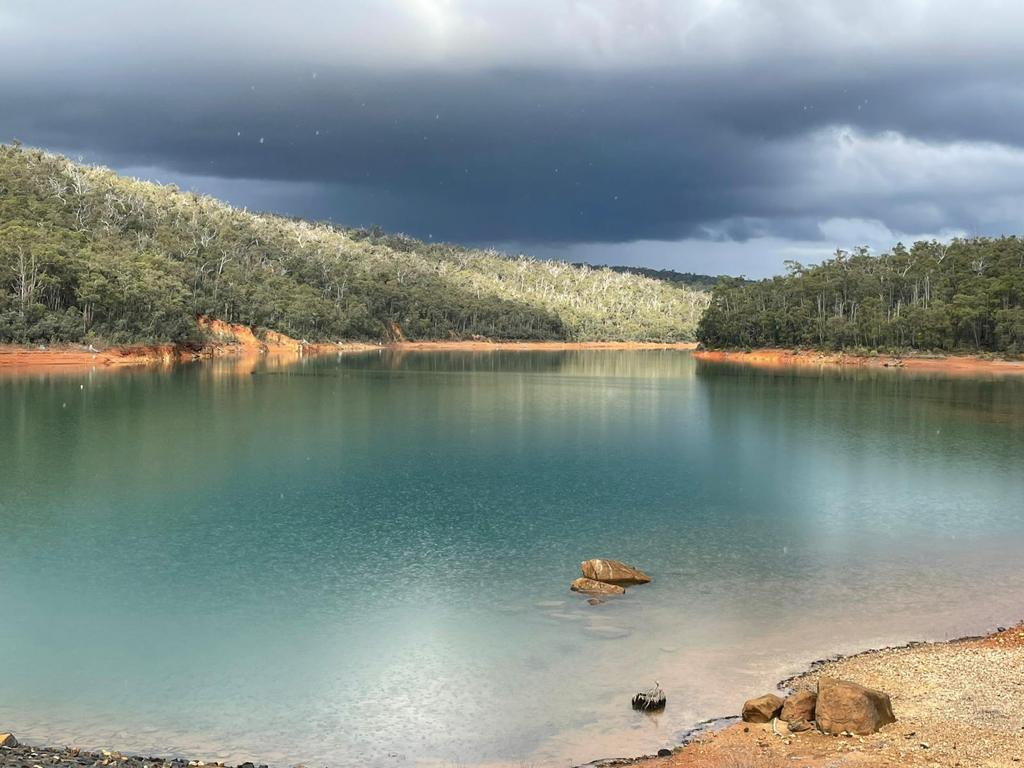
The lake formed by the dam

The creation of the dam was announced in March 1923 by Premier James Mitchell. Along with Canning Dam and Wungong Dam, it formed part of the Hills Water Supply Scheme which was intended to rectify severe water shortages in metropolitan Perth. Its capacity was initially estimated at 2,700 gigalitres (595×10^{9} imp gal).

Construction of the dam commenced in 1923 and was completed in 1929; the resident engineer was Sir Russell John Dumas.

The dam was added to the City of Armadale's heritage list on 1 December 2008.

== See also ==
- Darling Scarp
- List of reservoirs and dams in Australia
