= Wungong Regional Park =

Regional park in Perth, Western Australia

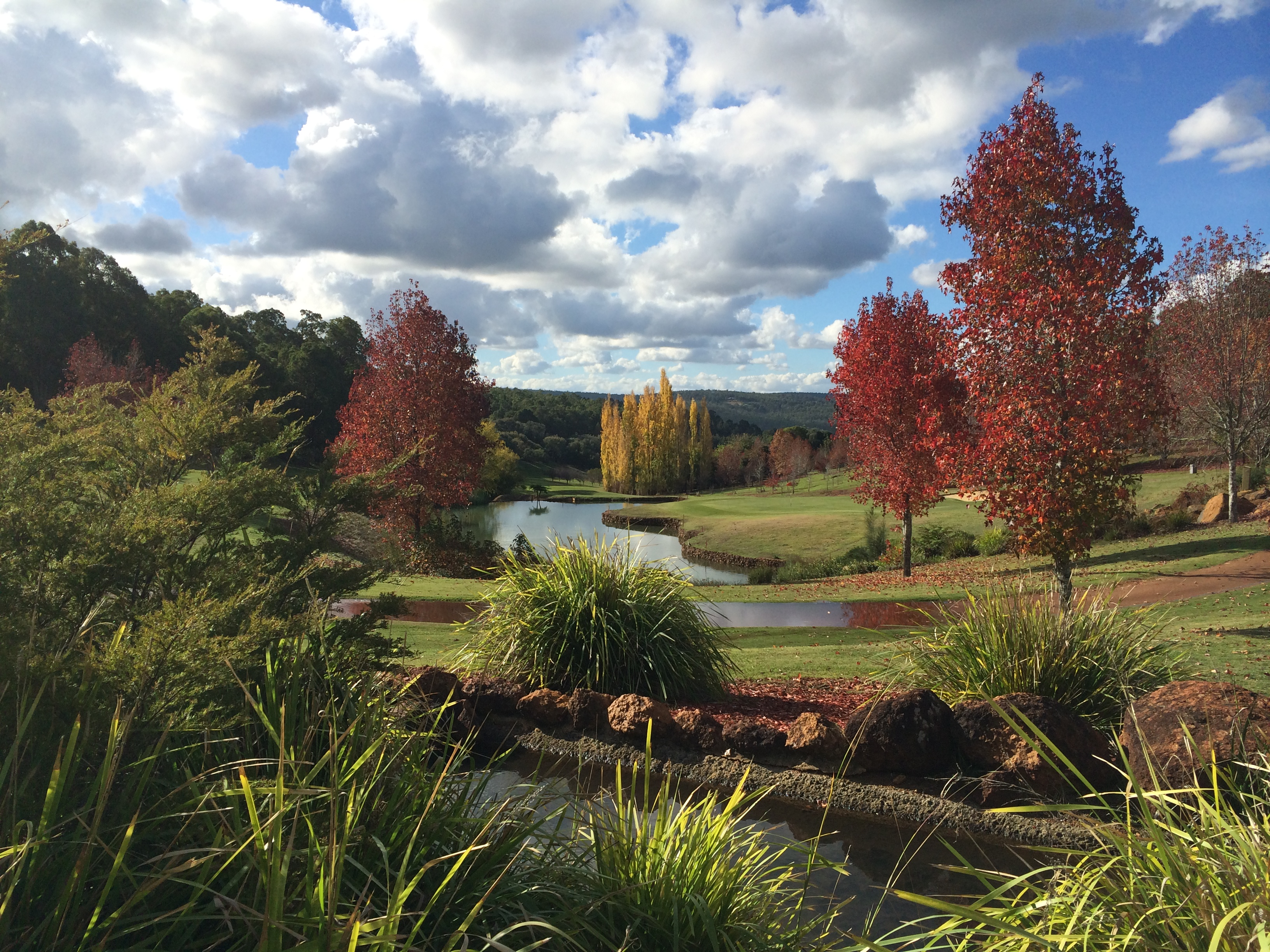
- Wungong Regional Park
- Interactive map of Wungong Regional Park
- Type: Regional park
- Location: City of Armadale
- Coordinates: 32°11′15″S 116°03′12″E
- Established: 2008
- Administrator: Department of Biodiversity, Conservation and Attractions
- Website: Official website

Wungong Regional Park is a conservation park near Bedfordale in the Perth Hills, 20 kilometres south-east of Perth, Western Australia, located within the City of Armadale.

== Overview ==
Wungong Regional Park was named after the Wungong townsite, established in 1909 which, in turn, had been named after the Wungong Brook, which was first traced by European explorers in 1835. The regional park's name was confirmed in 2008, alongside three other regional parks and three national parks in the area, which were renamed to reflect the Aboriginal heritage of the area.

Wungong is one of eleven regional parks in the Perth region of Western Australia. The purpose of these regional parks is to serve as urban havens to preserve and restore cultural heritage and valuable ecosystems as well as to encourage sustainable nature-based recreation activities.

== Area ==
Wungong Regional Park consists of the following reserves:

Image	Name	Location	Description	Co-ordinates
	Armadale Settlers Common	Bedfordale		32.152272°S 116.052205°E
	Bungendore Park	Bedfordale		32.182576°S 116.039079°E
	Churchman’s Bushland	Roleystone		32.145626°S 116.065534°E
	Jarrahdale State Forest		Only parts of the Jarrahdale State Forest belong to the Wungong Regional Park	
	Wungong Valley	Bedfordale		32.195889°S 116.059386°E
