= Canning Contour Channel =

Water transport system in Australia

Coordinates: 32°07′22.7″S 116°04′56.5″E

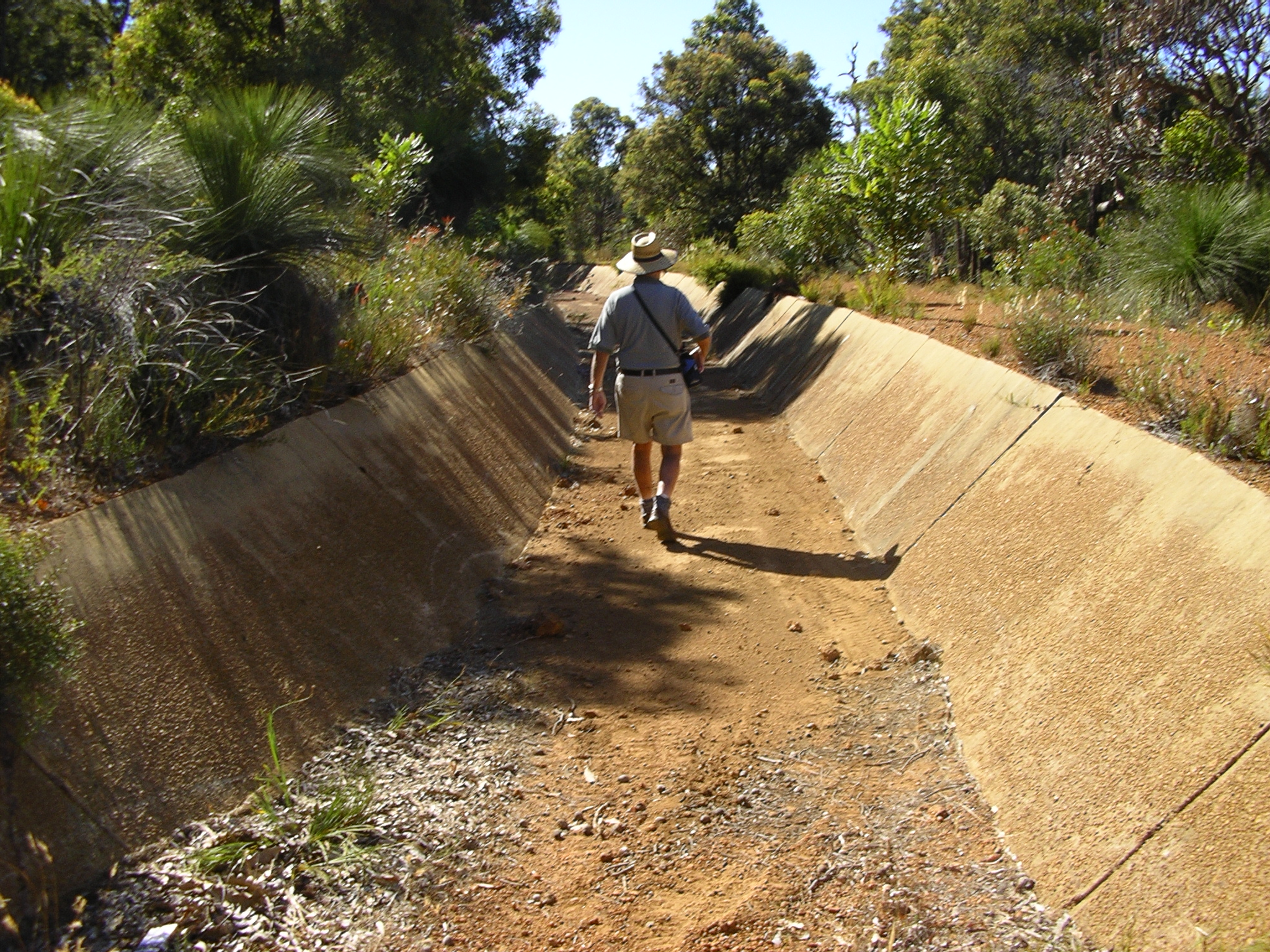
- Remnants of the channel, used by bushwalkers
- Interactive map of Canning Contour Channel

Specifications
- Length: 16 km (9.9 miles)

History
- Construction began: July 1935
- Date completed: December 1936

Western Australia Heritage Register
- Designated: 3 June 2005
- Reference no.: 3709

The Canning Contour Channel is a 16-kilometre (9.9 mi) series of human-made concrete channels and steel and cast-iron pipelines in the Darling Scarp in Western Australia constructed between July 1935 and December 1936. The project was a Depression era public works scheme to carry potable water from just below Canning Dam through the hills around and above Roleystone and Kelmscott to a screening, fluoridation and pumping station near Gosnells by following the natural contours of the Canning Valley – hence it was entirely gravity-fed. Where a tributary valley needed to be crossed, suspended or siphoning pipelines were used. From Gosnells, the water entered the city's pipeline distribution system.

The channel supplied drinking water to the metropolitan area of Perth from 1940 to 1975, before becoming redundant after the construction of the Canning Tunnel in the mid-1970s. Until the construction of Serpentine Dam in 1961, Canning Dam and the channel were the main sources of water supply for Perth. Large sections of the disused channel and associated infrastructure remain and provide useful bush-walking routes.

In 1950 a section of the channel collapsed at Araluen, causing severe water restrictions in Perth for several weeks.

== Course ==
The channel starts at a stilling chamber on the north bank of the Canning River, just below the Canning Dam. After just over 200 metres (660 ft), it enters a siphon to cross the Canning River. It then flows alongside McNess Drive down the Canning valley. A siphon is used to cross McNess Drive near the junction with Bristol Road and it also crosses the Canning River to the north bank. The channel flows to the north of Croyden Road into Roleystone to a point above Brookton Highway, which is crossed with a siphon. The channel continues west, then north-west to cross Peet Road between Knuckey Drive and Beales Crescent. It follows Contour Road to the west, and uses a siphon to cross Slab Gully. Further channels and siphons continue west to cross Canning Mills Road near Martin Street, and then north, crossing Turner Road on its way to its destination in Martin on Mills Road.

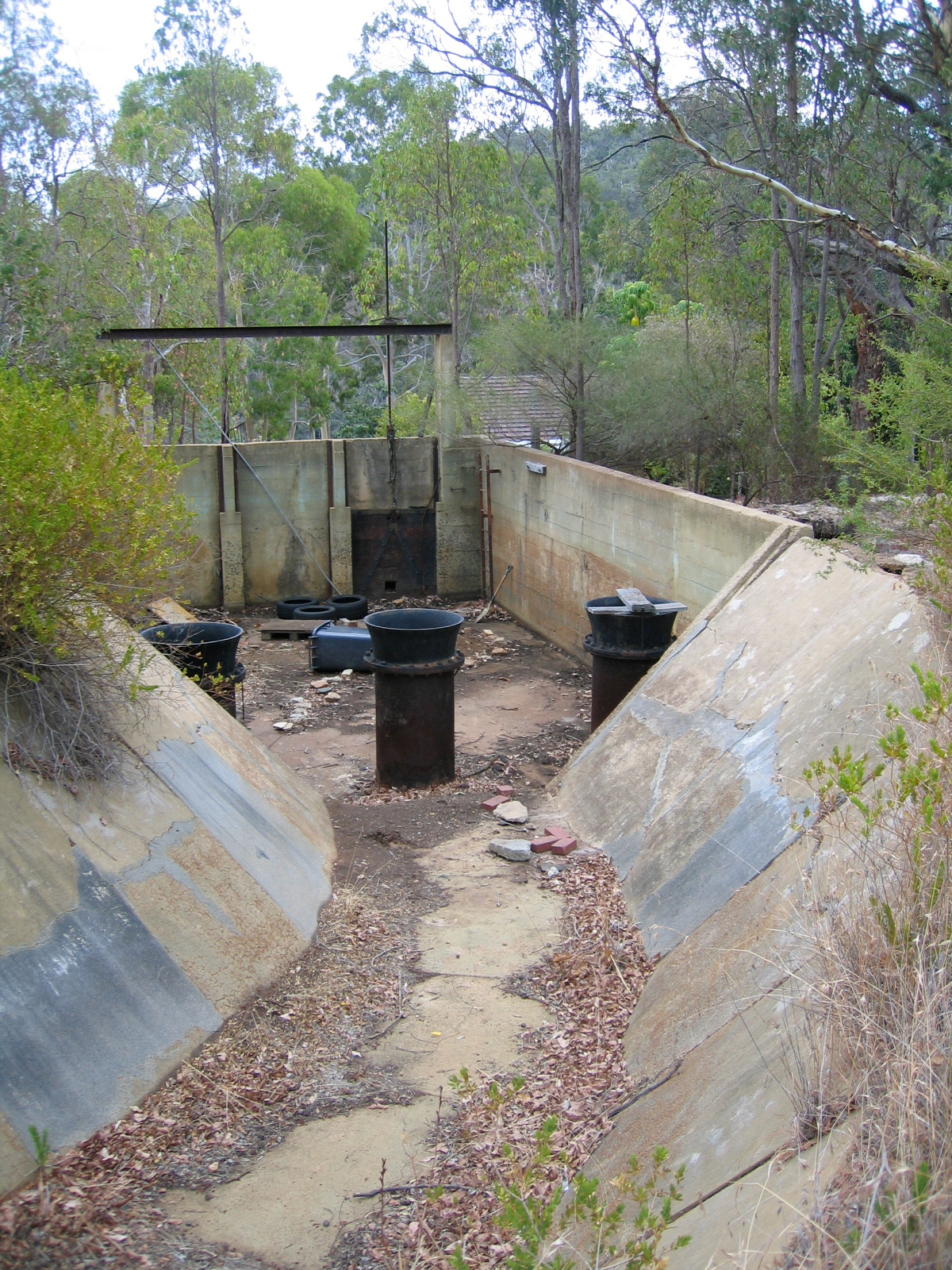
The Channel enters a pipe near Contour road, Roleystone

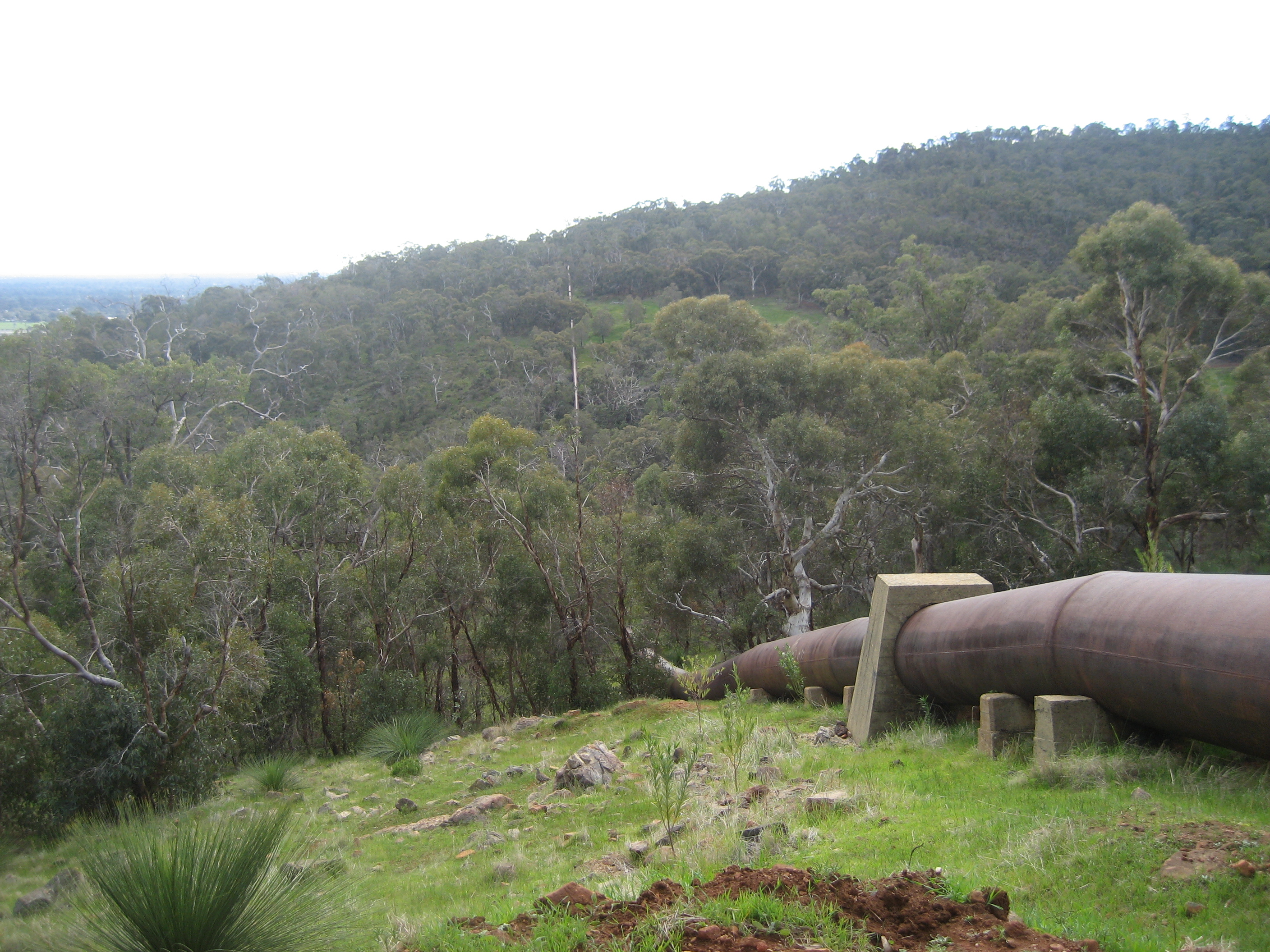
Pipeline crossing the Turner Road valley

== Construction ==
It was built by the Public Works Department for the Metropolitan Water Supply and was designed under the direction of several prominent engineers of the era: Russell Dumas, E. W. Tindale, Victor Munt and Don Munro. Engineers E. H. Oldham and J. W. Allen supervised the construction project. This was the same team which had overseen the design and construction of the Canning Dam and which was completed in 1940. Construction commenced in June 1935 and was completed in January 1937.

The project was a considerable technical achievement which required a high degree of manual labour due to the hilly terrain which made it difficult to access with mechanical equipment. Most of the construction was carried out by unemployed men on relief work.

Prior to completion, water from the partially filled Canning Dam and the pipehead dam below was conveyed to Perth through a 762 millimetres (30 in) pipeline to Kelmscott and a 914-millimetre (36 in) pipeline from there to the storage reservoir at Mount Eliza in Kings Park. Once the dam wall was completed and the dam had filled, the pipeline was discontinued. A 1.37-metre (4 ft 6 in) pipeline carried the water from Gosnells to Cannington where it was diverted to Fremantle and King's Park.

Three hundred and twenty men were laid off when construction was completed and the total cost of the project was £A 125,000, equivalent to A$13 million in 2022, almost 20% less than the estimated £A 155,000.

The typical profile of the channel is a culvert approximately 1.5 metres (4 ft 11 in) wide at its base with raking sides at 45 degrees banking up to the natural ground level where the top of the channel is approximately 3 metres (9.8 ft) wide with a depth of approximately 1 metre (3 ft 3 in). The channel was cut from the natural ground or rock and then lined with concrete made from Western Australian made cement mixed with locally sourced oolithic laterite aggregate.

Pipework across shallow gullies was typically cast iron of varying diameters, joined by lead seals. Deeper gullies were crossed using steel pipes joined by welding.

A separate contour channel ran north from Canning Dam to allow Mundaring Weir to be replenished with water from Canning Dam. This is now inaccessible as it is within the dam's water catchment areas. Another channel ran from Kangaroo Gully near Karragullen into Canning Dam to augment the water catchment.
