= Wungong Dam =

Dam in Western Australia

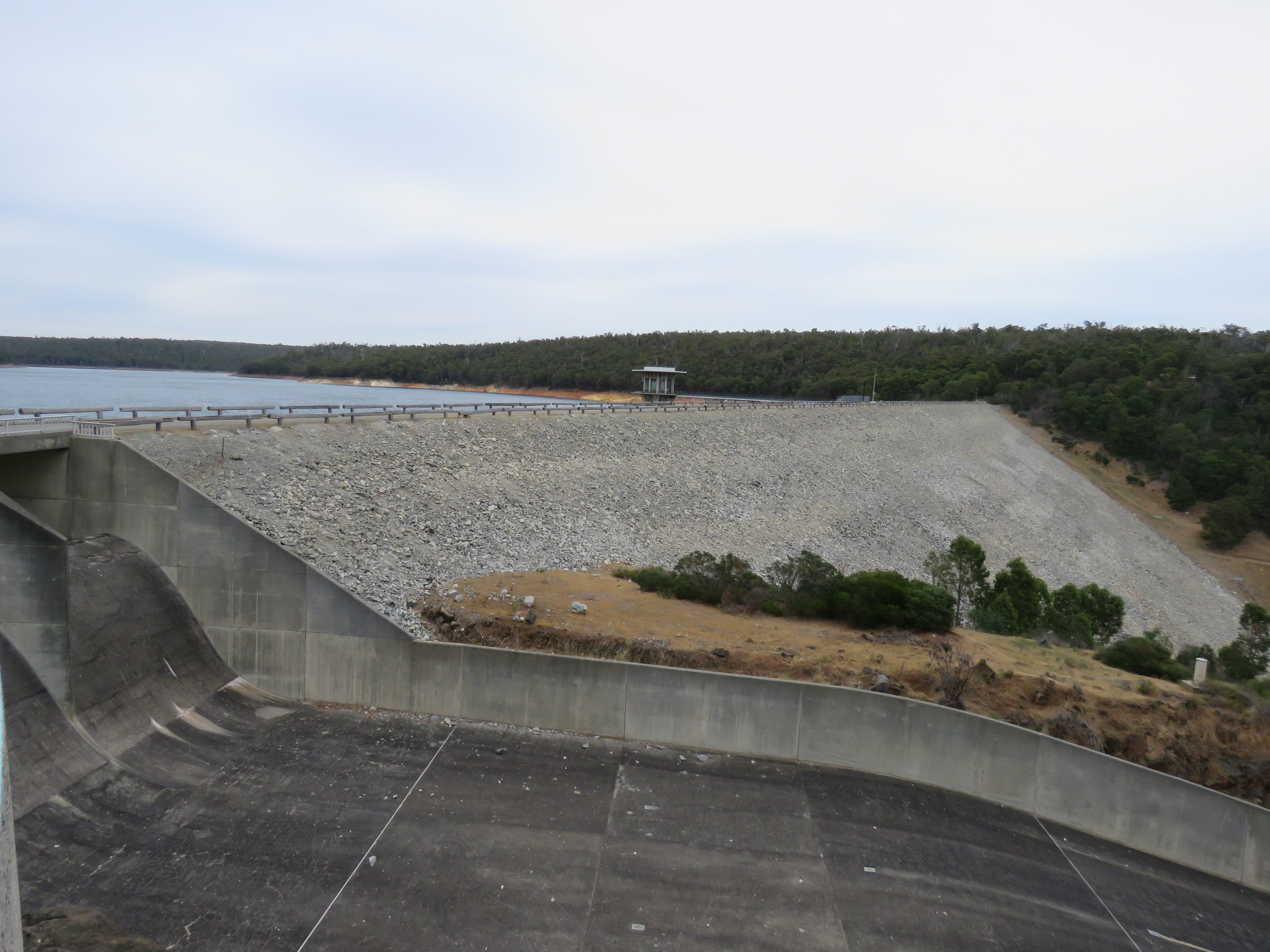
- The dam in 2024

- Location of the dam in Western Australia
- Interactive map of Wungong Dam
- Country: Australia
- Location: Bedfordale, Western Australia
- Coordinates: 32°12′03″S 116°03′51″E
- Purpose: Potable water supply
- Status: Operational
- Opening date: 1979
- Owner: Water Corporation

Dam and spillways
- Type of dam: Rock-fill dam
- Impounds: Wungong Brook
- Height: 65 m (213 ft)
- Length: 460 m (1,510 ft)
- Dam volume: 1,723×10^{3} m^{3} (60.8×10^{6} cu ft)
- Spillway type: Chute spillway
- Spillway capacity: 445 m^{3}/s (15,700 cu ft/s)

Reservoir
- Creates: Wungong Reservoir
- Total capacity: 66 GL (54,000 acre⋅ft)
- Catchment area: 132 km^{2} (51 sq mi)
- Surface area: 330.5 ha (817 acres)

Western Australia Heritage Register
- Official name: Wungong Dam
- Type: City of Armadale Municipal Inventory
- Designated: 1 December 2008
- Reference no.: 18963

The Wungong Dam is a rock-fill embankment dam across the Wungong Brook, located in the Darling Range, in Western Australia. It is situated 8 kilometres (5 mi) south of Churchman Brook Dam.

== Overview ==
The creation of the dam was announced in March 1923 by Premier James Mitchell as part of the Hills Water Supply Scheme, along with Churchman Brook Dam and Canning Dam. The scheme was intended to rectify severe water shortages in metropolitan Perth. A pipehead dam was built on the brook in 1925 and construction of the current dam commenced in 1975. A number of farms that had been established within the catchment of the dam were resumed and their built infrastructure demolished. The completed dam was opened in 1979.

The dam is 65 metres (213 ft) high and 460 metres (1,510 ft) long. The resultant 59.8-gigalitre (15.8-billion-US-gallon) reservoir draws from a 132-square-kilometre (51 sq mi) catchment area.

The dam is on the City of Armadale's heritage list, having been registered on 1 December 2008.

== See also ==
- List of dams and reservoirs in Western Australia
