= Canning Dam =

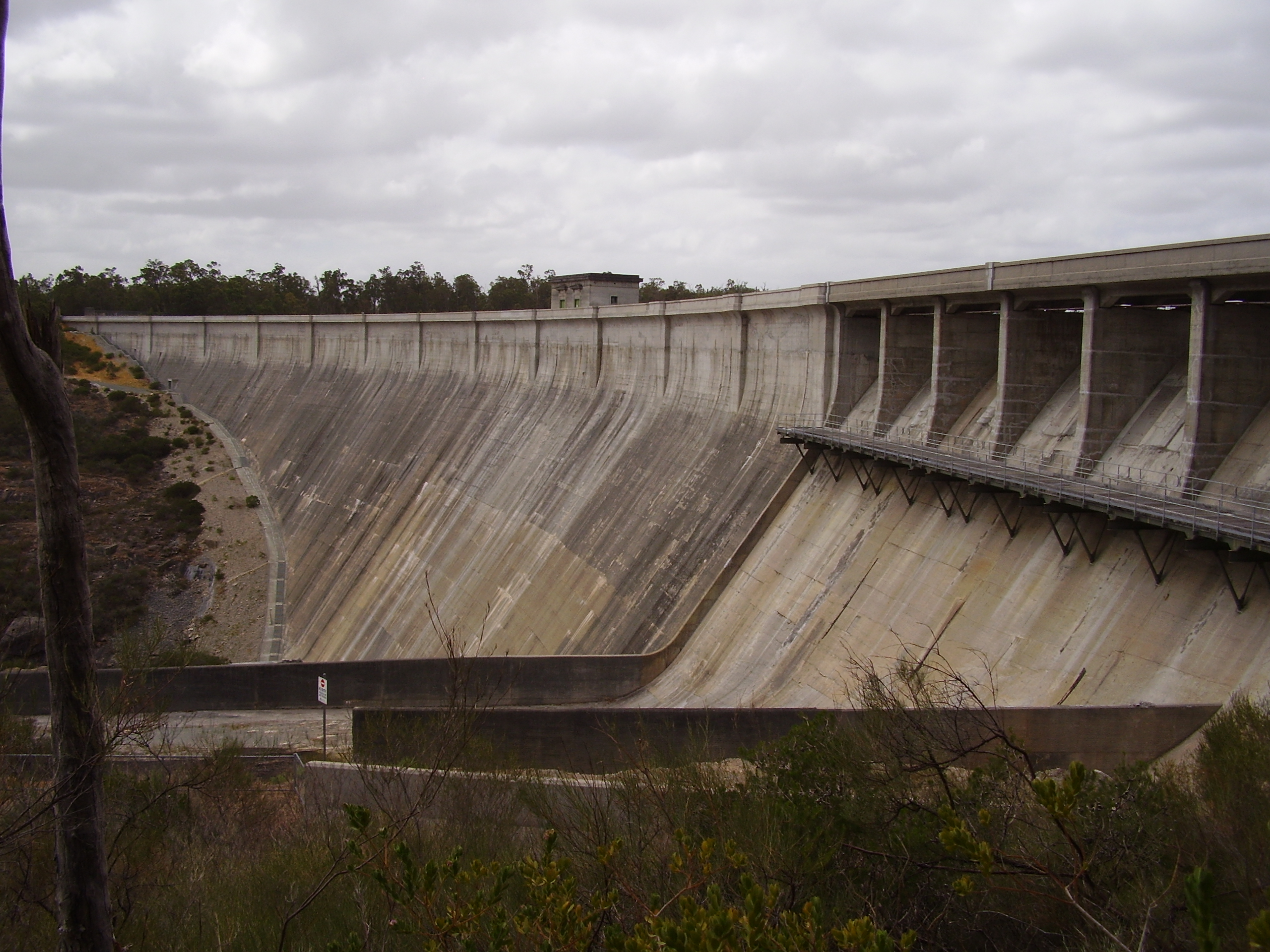
- The dam wall and spillway

- Location of the dam in Western Australia
- Interactive map of Canning Dam
- Country: Australia
- Location: Ashendon, City of Armadale, Western Australia
- Coordinates: 32°9′9″S 116°7′42″E
- Purpose: Water supply
- Status: Operational
- Construction began: 1933
- Opening date: 1940
- Construction cost: £A 1.1 million
- Operator: Water Corporation

Dam and spillways
- Type of dam: Gravity dam
- Impounds: Canning River
- Height: 66 m (217 ft)
- Length: 466 m (1,529 ft)

Reservoir
- Creates: Canning Reservoir
- Total capacity: 90,352 ML (73,250 acre⋅ft)
- Catchment area: 804 km^{2} (310 sq mi) (Note: Small discrepancies exist.)
- Surface area: 501 ha (1,240 acres)

Western Australia Heritage Register
- Official name: Canning Dam
- Type: City of Armadale Municipal Inventory
- Designated: 1 December 2008
- Reference no.: 3830

The Canning Dam is a gravity dam across the Canning River, located near Ashendon, in the City of Armadale, Western Australia. Completed in 1940, the dam created the Canning Reservoir that serves as a major source of potable water for the city of Perth, Western Australia. The dam's catchment area is dean from the Darling Scarp. It is noted for its innovative structural and hydraulic design that was considered to be at the forefront of concrete gravity dam design at the time of construction in from 1933 to its completion.

The Canning Dam was Perth's primary water supply up until the 1961 when other sources of fresh water were tapped, such as the Serpentine dam. Currently the dam supplies approximately 20 percent of Perth's fresh water. Inflow into the Canning Reservoir is estimated to be 22 gigalitres (18,000 acre⋅ft) and, when full, the reservoir has a storage capacity of 90.352 gigalitres (73,250 acre⋅ft).

Since its completion in 1940, the Canning Dam has contributed to a wide range of environmental and ecological problems in surrounding regions, problems include more common algal blooms, habitat loss and sedimentation. Despite these issues, Canning Dam and the adjacent parks and forests provide a variety of recreational activities for the public such as bushwalking, historic walks and picnic facilities.

== History ==
Development of the Canning River as a source of water for Perth was first proposed in a report of the first Metropolitan Water Works Board of Perth in 1896. Investigation of the site began in 1897 when engineer Thomas Hodgson surveyed and proposed the dam's current location as a possible site. However, despite the recommendations of further inquiries, and an extreme shortage of water in some years, government funds were not allocated for the construction of a dam until the Great Depression in the 1930s.

In March 1923, Premier James Mitchell announced that the Canning River would be dammed as part of the Hills Water Supply Scheme, along with Churchman Brook Dam and Wungong Dam. The scheme was intended to rectify severe water shortages in metropolitan Perth. In 1924 a small pipehead dam was built 6 kilometres (4 mi) downstream from the present Canning Dam. It was intended as only a quick fix to the water supply problem and it soon became apparent that a major reservoir was needed, although it was nine years before work on the current Canning Dam began. The new dam was completed in 1940 at a cost of £A 1.1 million, equivalent to A$104.8 million in 2022. Engineer Russell Dumas designed the dam and directed most of its construction.

A further improvement was made in 1951 when a concrete-lined channel was constructed to divert stream flow from the nearby Kangaroo Gully catchment. The Canning Dam and reservoir was Perth's primary source of water until the boom growth of the city in the 1960s and the completion of Serpentine Dam in 1961. In 1975 the reservoir was connected to Perth's Integrated Water Supply System by the Canning Tunnel. Prior to its opening water had flowed through the Canning Contour Channel to Gosnells.

The Canning Dam and reservoir still supplies approximately 20 percent of Perth's drinking water requirements and plays an important role in the context of the development of Perth.

The Canning reservoir is also used to store water from Kwinana Desalination Plant. Treated water can be pumped from the plant to the reservoir through the Forrestdale Pumping Station.

== Hydrology ==
The Canning Dam catchment lies within the Darling Scarp which forms part of an Archaean Shield composed largely of granite with some invaded linear belts of metamorphosed sedimentary and volcanic rocks. The dam wall is situated in a narrow gorge running east and west, with rock sides sloping upward from the river bed. Behind the dam wall, the south branch of the Canning River joins the main stream, with the impounded water forming a lake which stretches back in three major arms to the east south-east and south.

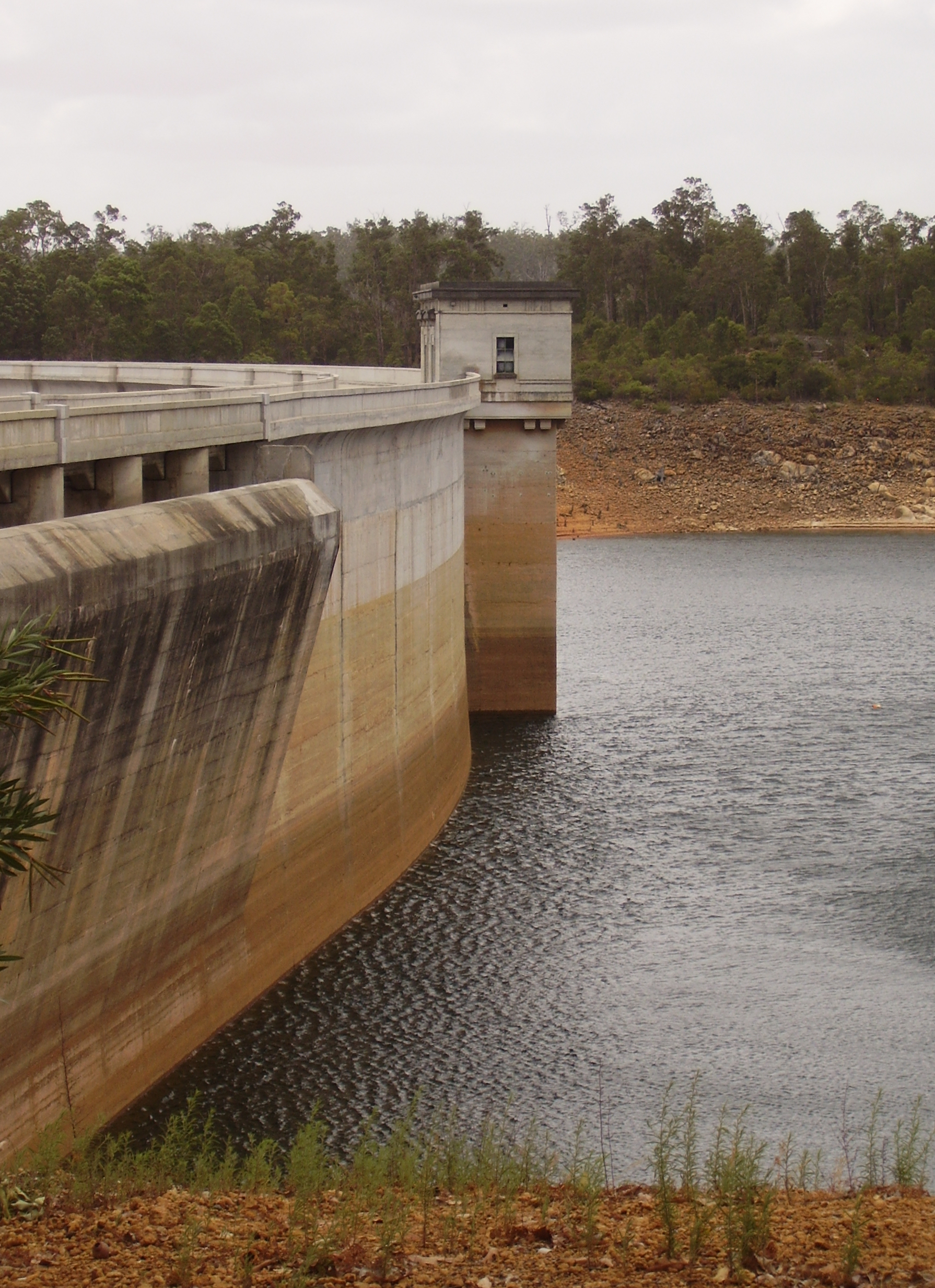
Canning Dam, as it appeared at 34% of capacity

The catchment area is 804 square kilometres (310 sq mi). The reservoir is at 200 metres (660 ft) AHD and the highest point of the catchment, Mount Cooke is at 582 metres (1,909 ft) AHD.

Climatically, the area receives about 900 millimetres (35 in) of rainfall per annum with most of this falling between May and September. There is a large variability of rainfall across the catchment however, from between 700 and 1,300 millimetres (28 and 51 in).

Since 1975 long-term average rainfalls at the dam wall have decreased by 20 percent and streamflow into the catchment by approximately 60 percent—the average annual inflow between 1948 and 1974 was 52 gigalitres (42,000 acre⋅ft) which reduced to 22 gigalitres (18,000 acre⋅ft) between 1975 and 2004.

== Construction ==
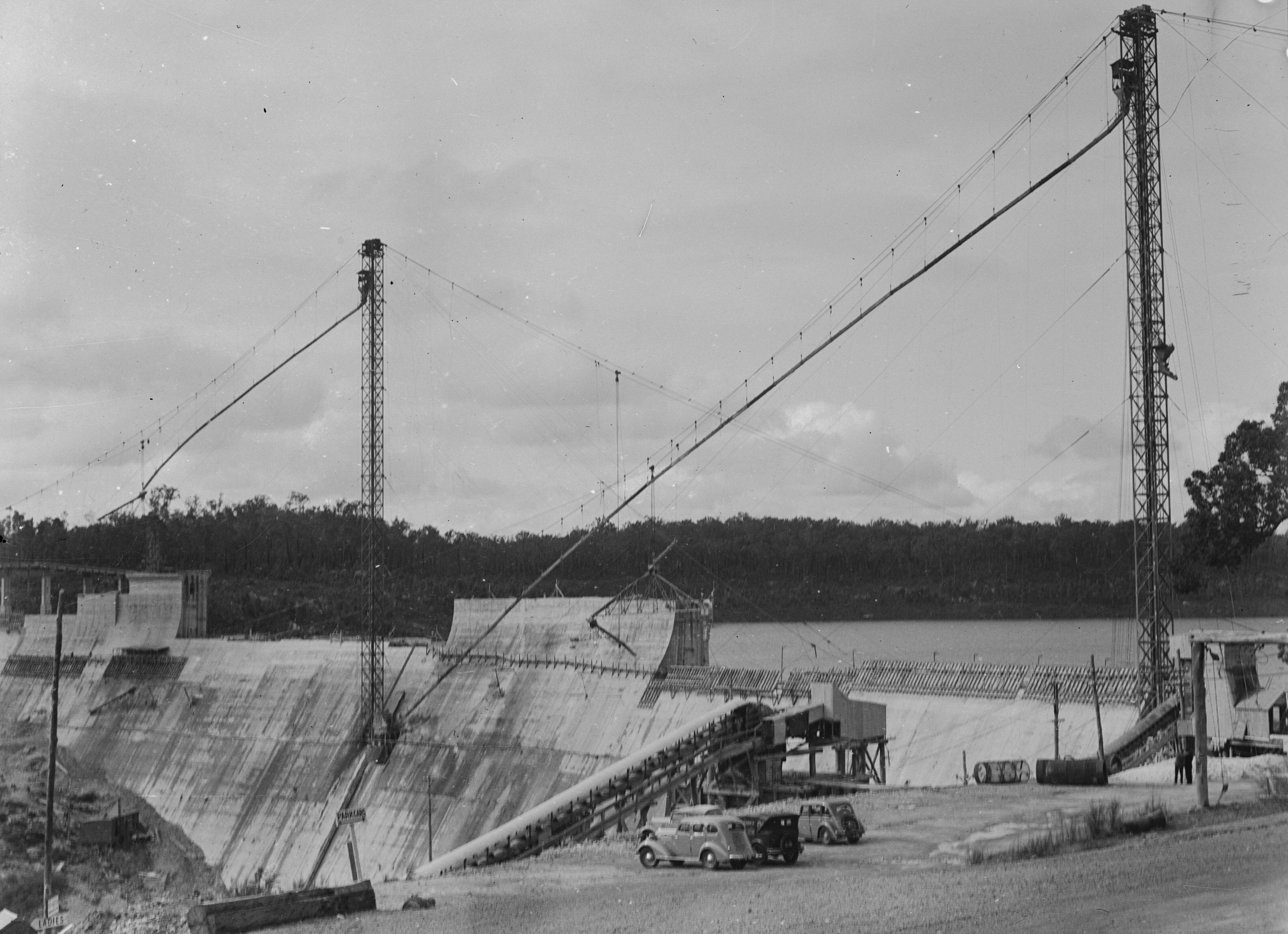
Construction of dam wall, 1939

The construction of Canning Dam ended a long period during which Perth's water supply was generally unsatisfactory in quality (either due to salinity or bacterial pollution or both) and in quantity. The project, the biggest public works program of the decade, stimulated significant growth in the local economy and provided desperately needed work for around five hundred men.

Several innovative design concepts and construction methods which were new to Australia were introduced on the project, while others which were used on the nearby Wellington Dam, were improved upon at the Canning dam site.

At the Canning Dam, as with all dams, care had to be taken to prevent water seepage between the foundation rock and the structure of the dam. At the Canning, in addition to cutting back the foundation to solid unfractured rock, a cut-off trench was sited near the upstream face of the dam, down stream of which a rock filled drain containing open jointed pipes was provided to intercept any seepage between the rock face and the concrete of the dam. The inclusion of an internal drainage system was considered innovative at the time. Near-vertical tubular 20-centimetre (8 in) cut-off drains were provided at 1.5-metre (5 ft) intervals along the dam to relieve internal seepage through the concrete.

While state of the art materials-handling methods were used, in some instances labour-saving machinery worked beside operations intended to maximise the labour content. Sustenance workers were employed for chiefly on-site preparation, road construction, foundation excavation, clearing timber from the reservoir basin, and on some concreting operations. Skilled workers were required on the dam for fixing the formwork where the concrete was poured. These workers were probably employed at normal day labour rates, the main employment method used on the project. Bulk handling of cement was also used for the first time in Australia; this saw a significant saving as opposed to bagged cement, which was the standard practice of the day.

Generally construction work proceeded smoothly, and from an engineering point of view there were few setbacks. However, one did occur in the early stages of construction. In March 1934 a violent storm brought 130 millimetres (5.1 in) of rain in less than two days. As a result, the river rose rapidly, flooding the dam foundation workings. Pumps had to be installed and work resumed three days later.

The dam was completed in September 1940. When built it was the longest concrete gravity dam in Australia, and also the second highest after the Burrinjuck Dam in New South Wales. As of 1997, of the 90 large concrete and masonry gravity dams in Australia, the Canning Dam is still the fifth highest and the sixth longest. It is the largest concrete dam in Western Australia in terms of length of crest and volume of concrete.

The final cost of the dam was significantly less than had been originally budgeted for, and the work was completed on schedule to a date that was calculated seven years previously.

=== Remedial works ===
In c. 2003, it was reported that the Canning Dam was subjected to considerable cracking of the upper parts of the dam and upper gallery. Investigations have shown that cracking was due to strong alkali aggregate reactivity (AAR) in the concrete. AAR results in swelling of the concrete, which may cause secondary compressive stresses, localised map cracks, and, ultimately structural cracks. In addition, the concrete tensile strength and elasticity significantly decreases. Many old concrete dams are known to suffer from AAR, including Fontana Dam in Tennessee and Pian Telessio dam in Italy.

Extensive remedial works were undertaken between 1999 and 2001 to strengthen the dam wall. This work involved removing the top 3.8 metres (12 ft) of the existing dam wall and drilling/blasting through the dam wall plus up to a further 70 metres (230 ft) into the bedrock below. The top section of the wall was then rebuilt using reinforced concrete. Finally, permanent, re-stressable ground anchors were installed through the formed and drilled holes from the crest to be stressed and grouted into the foundation rock. At time of completion, these were the largest capacity and longest permanent ground anchors installed in the world.

An innovative drilling and blasting technique called penetrating cone fracture (PCF) was used in the remedial works process. PCF was chosen over conventional drilling and/or blasting techniques due to the reduced risk of damage to the existing structure from vibration, as well as lower noxious fume and dust levels.

== Environmental issues ==
Since the construction of the Canning Dam, among other drinking water supply dams, water flow into the Canning River has been reduced by up to 96%. A number of freshwater fish species endemic to the south-west of Western Australia are found in the Canning River system, however studies of fish and fish habitats in the area have shown that fish numbers are low due to a loss of habitat and a loss of linkage between breeding areas due to low flows, preventing fish migrating upstream and reaching important breeding and nursery grounds. Stagnant water caused by a lack of water flow has provided a suitable habitat for successful breeding of an introduced pest, the mosquitofish.

Damming of the Canning caused dramatic flow reductions that significantly altered downstream aquatic macroinvertebrate communities. The lack of water flow has also resulted in a poor flushing effect below the dam wall. An excessive amount of nutrients from fertilizers and animal waste has caused algal blooms and eutrophication.

Many river pools, which are an important summer refuge and habitat for aquatic and terrestrial flora and fauna, have been lost due to sedimentation and modification of the flow regime caused by impoundments in the Canning River.

Periodic flooding of the Canning River from the dam is required to disperse seed, stimulate germination and ensure seedlings survive, recharge shallow groundwater tables that are important during periods of drought, and to discourage and prevent weed growth. However, during times of low rainfall periodic flooding is reduced.

== Recreation ==
A number of recreation activities occur in and around the dam and catchment area. Canning Dam features a number of picnic areas (with gas barbecues), look outs and historic walks – many with disabled access. Bushwalking occurs throughout the catchment, particularly along the Bibbulmun Track, which passes through the catchment approximately 10 kilometres (6.2 mi) upstream of Canning Dam. Several mountain bike trails run either through the Canning National Park or adjacent State Forest areas.

The Canning Reservoir, Canning River and tributaries are illegally fished for marron, especially during summer. Boating, fishing and swimming are prohibited in the reservoir for health and hygiene reasons. Unauthorised camping (including overnight stays and/or outside of designated areas) and unauthorised trail establishment occur more and more frequently in the Canning catchment.

== Engineering heritage ==
The dam received a Historic Engineering Marker from Engineers Australia as part of its Engineering Heritage Recognition Program.

== Gallery ==
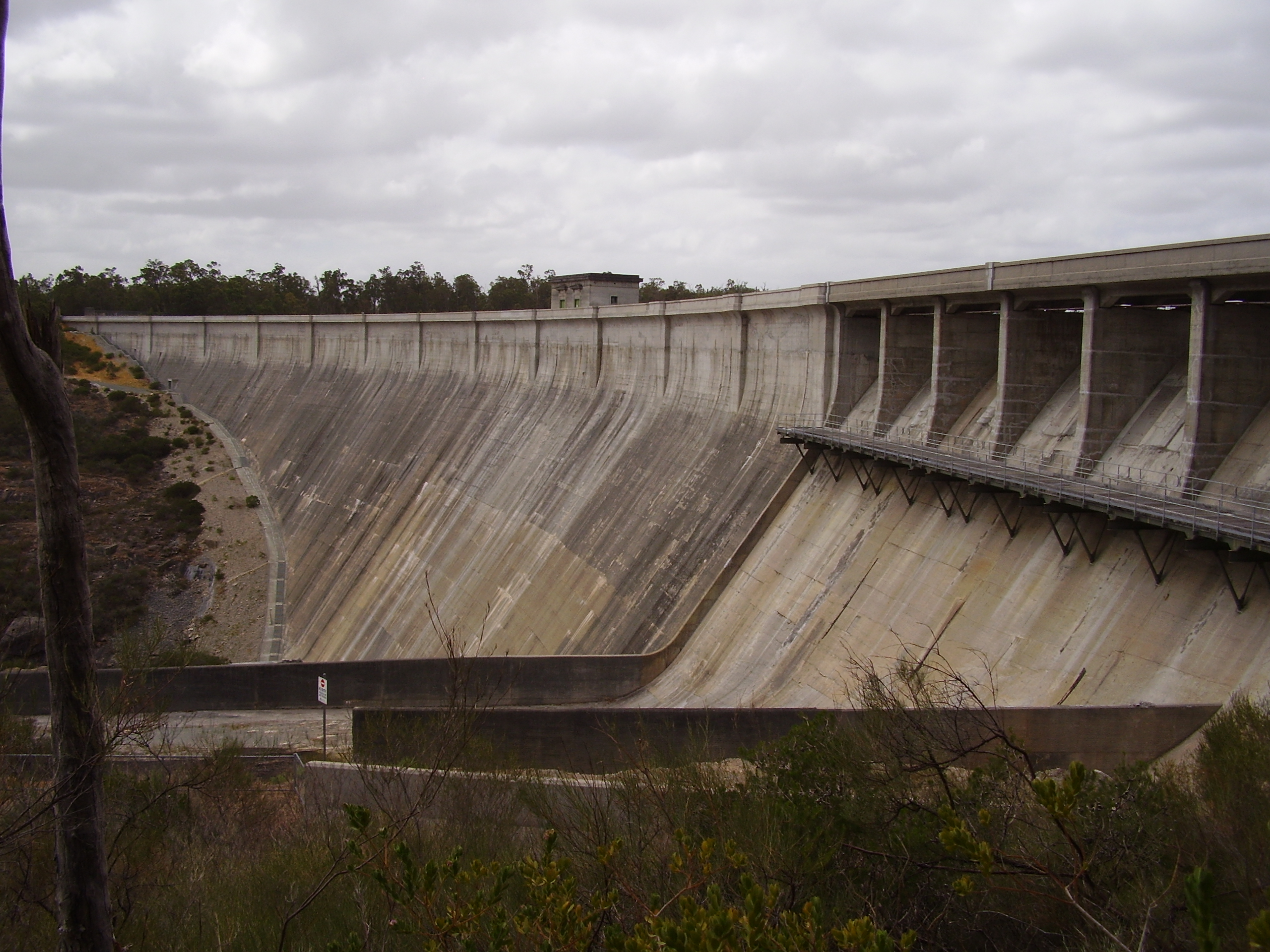
Dam wall and slip-way

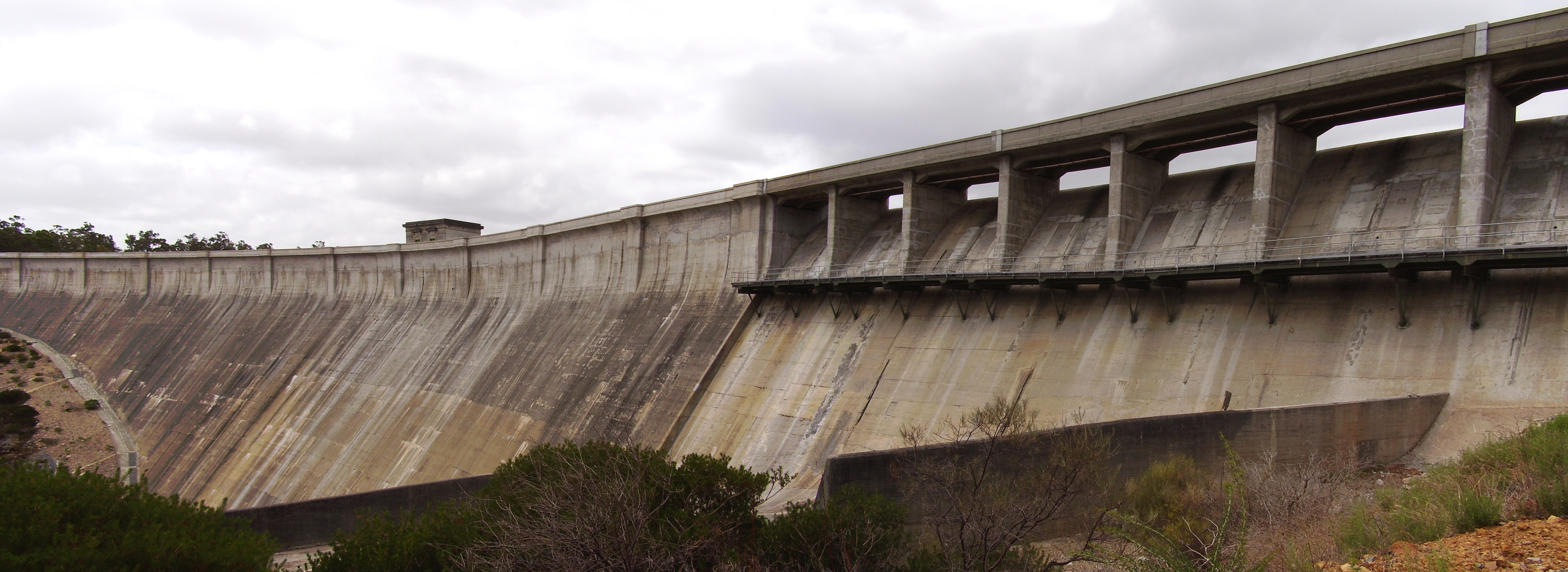
Spillway

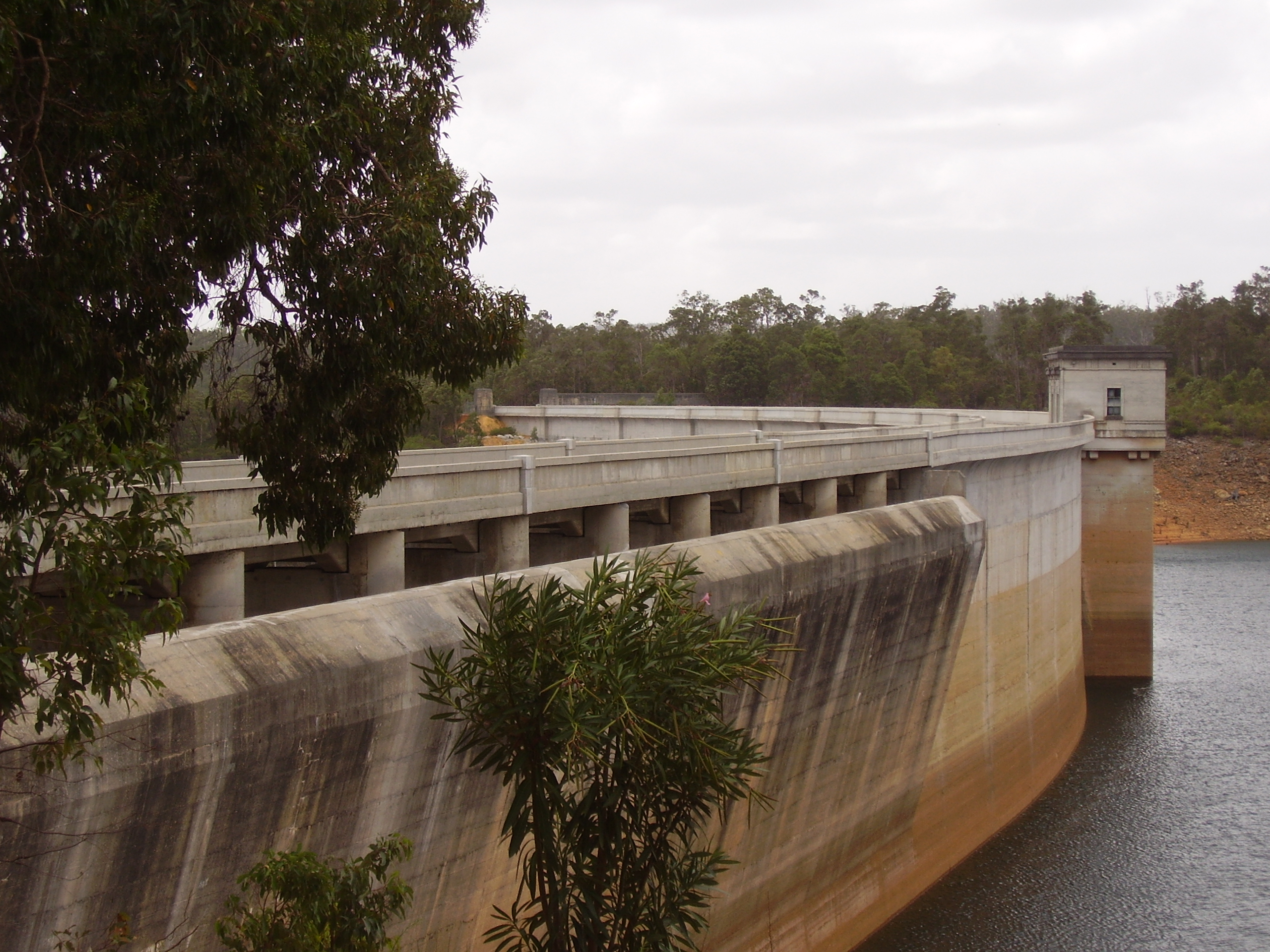
Spillway, reservoir side

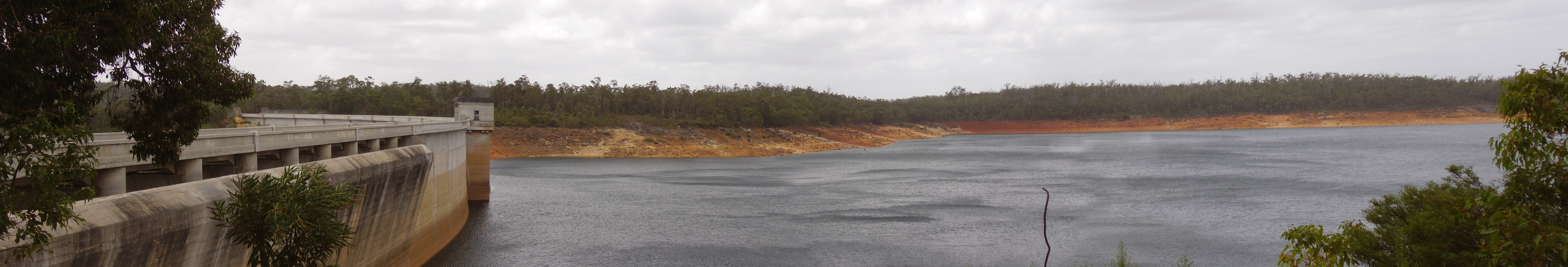
Panorama

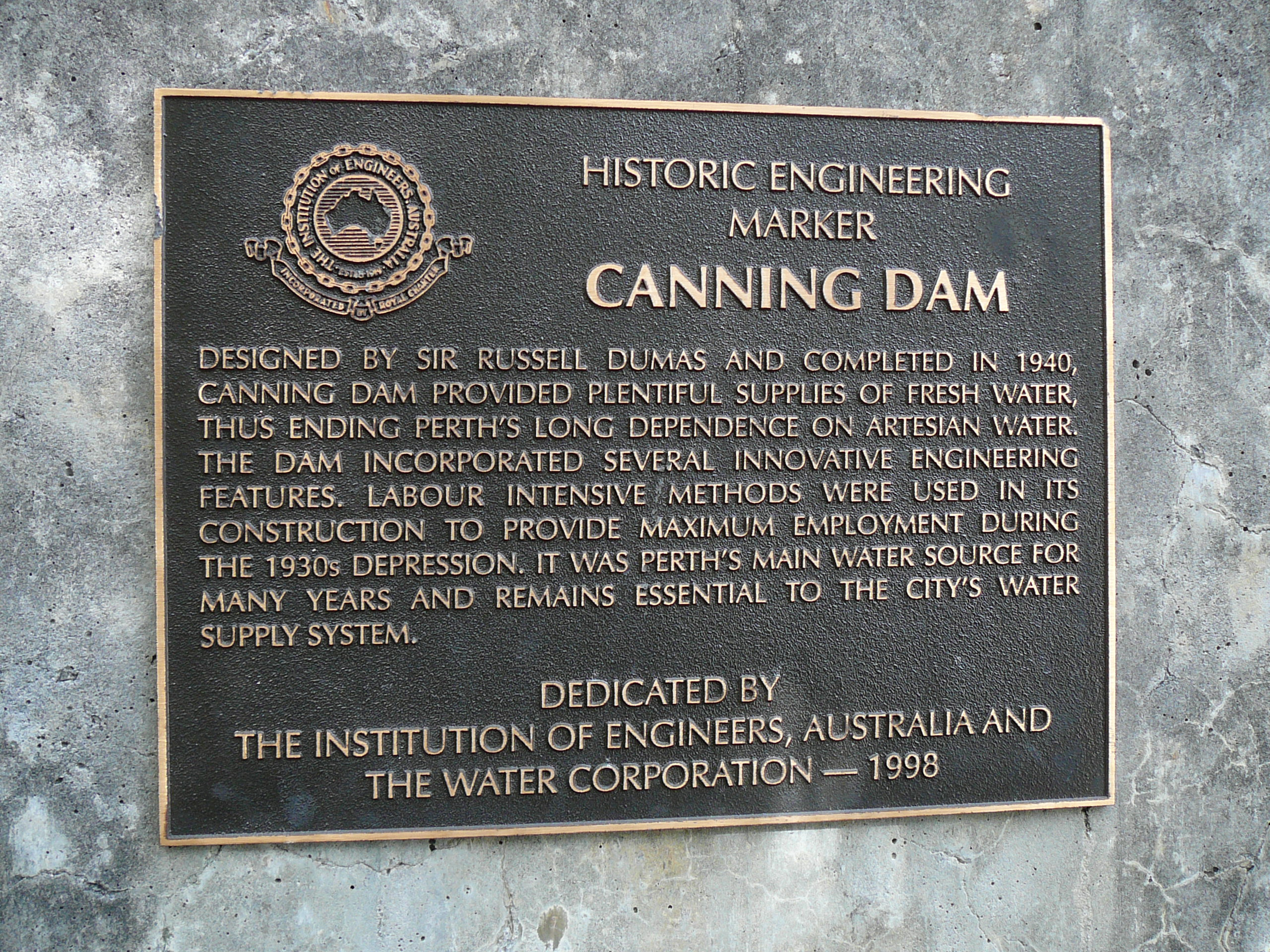
Commemorative plaque

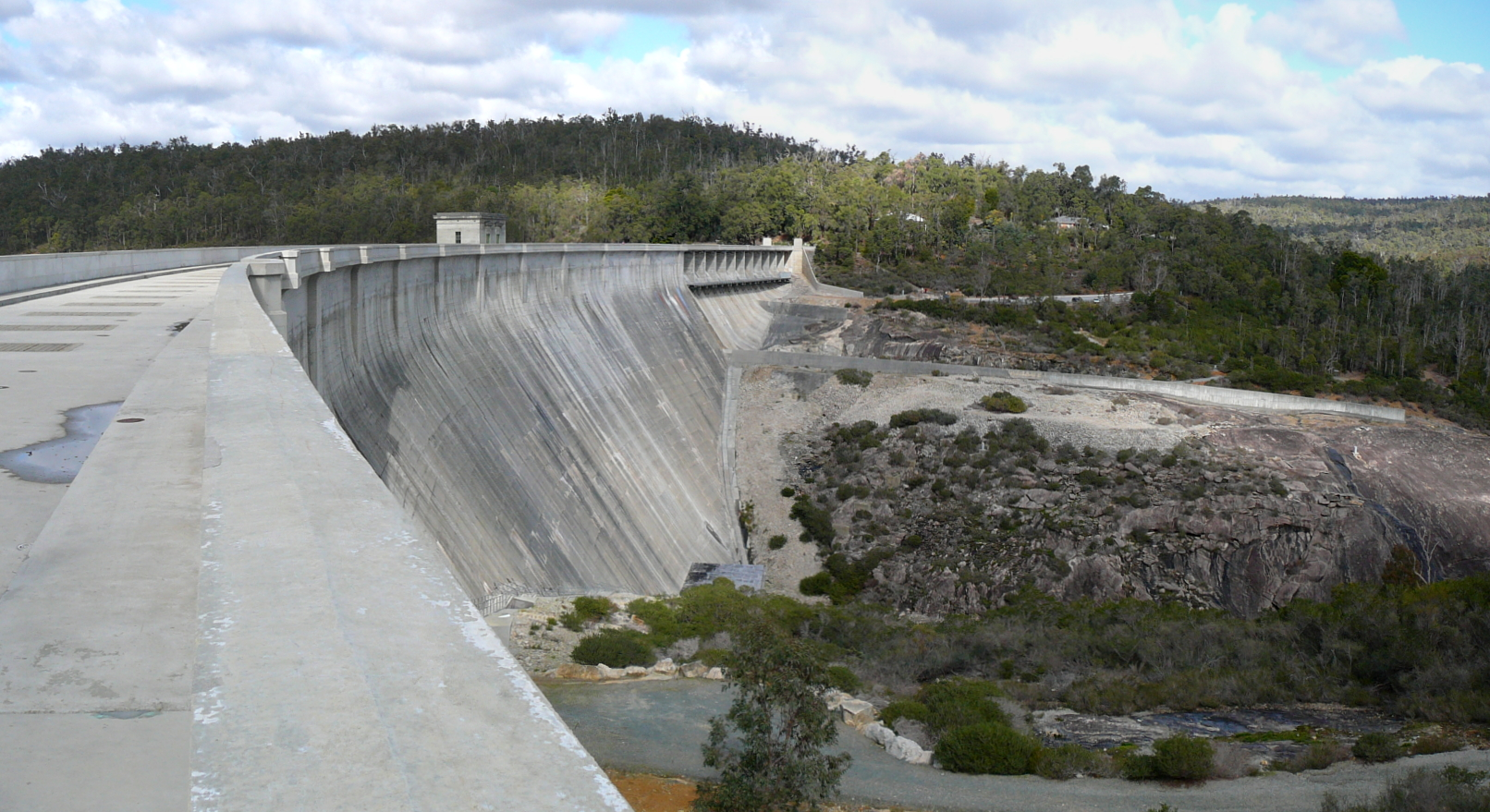
Canning Dam wall, from the top of the walkway

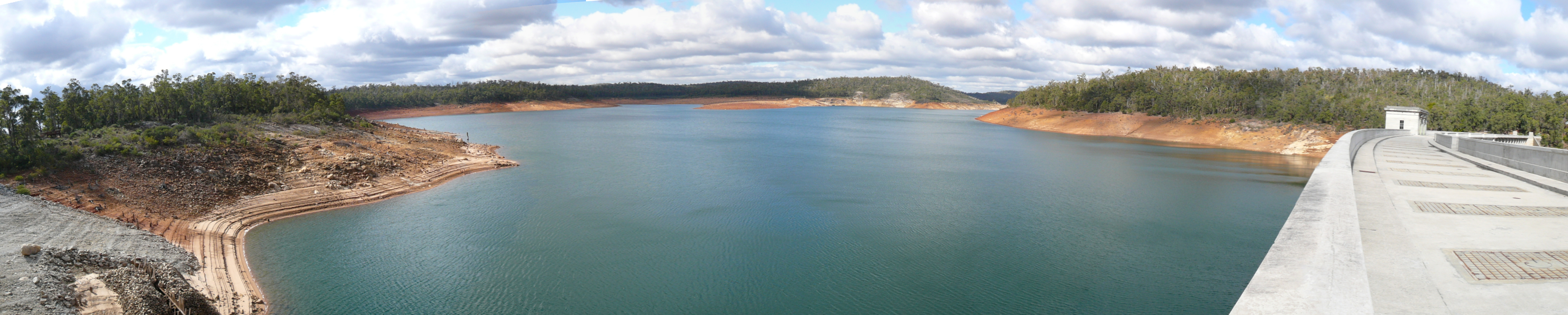
Canning Dam catchment, reservoir side

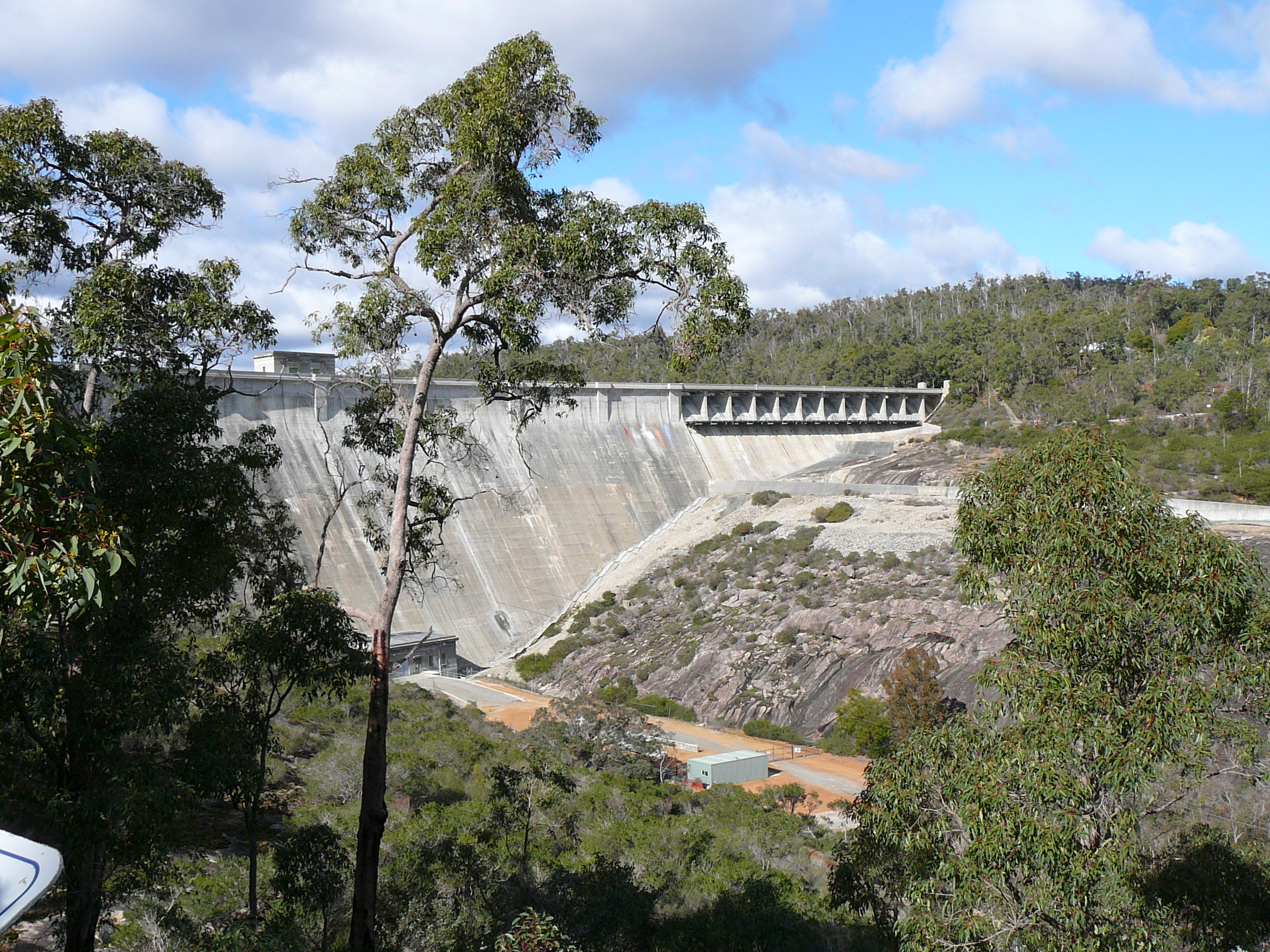
View of the dam including the spillway

== See also ==
- List of reservoirs and dams in Western Australia
- Swan River
