= Bedfordale, Western Australia =

Bedfordale
- Suburb
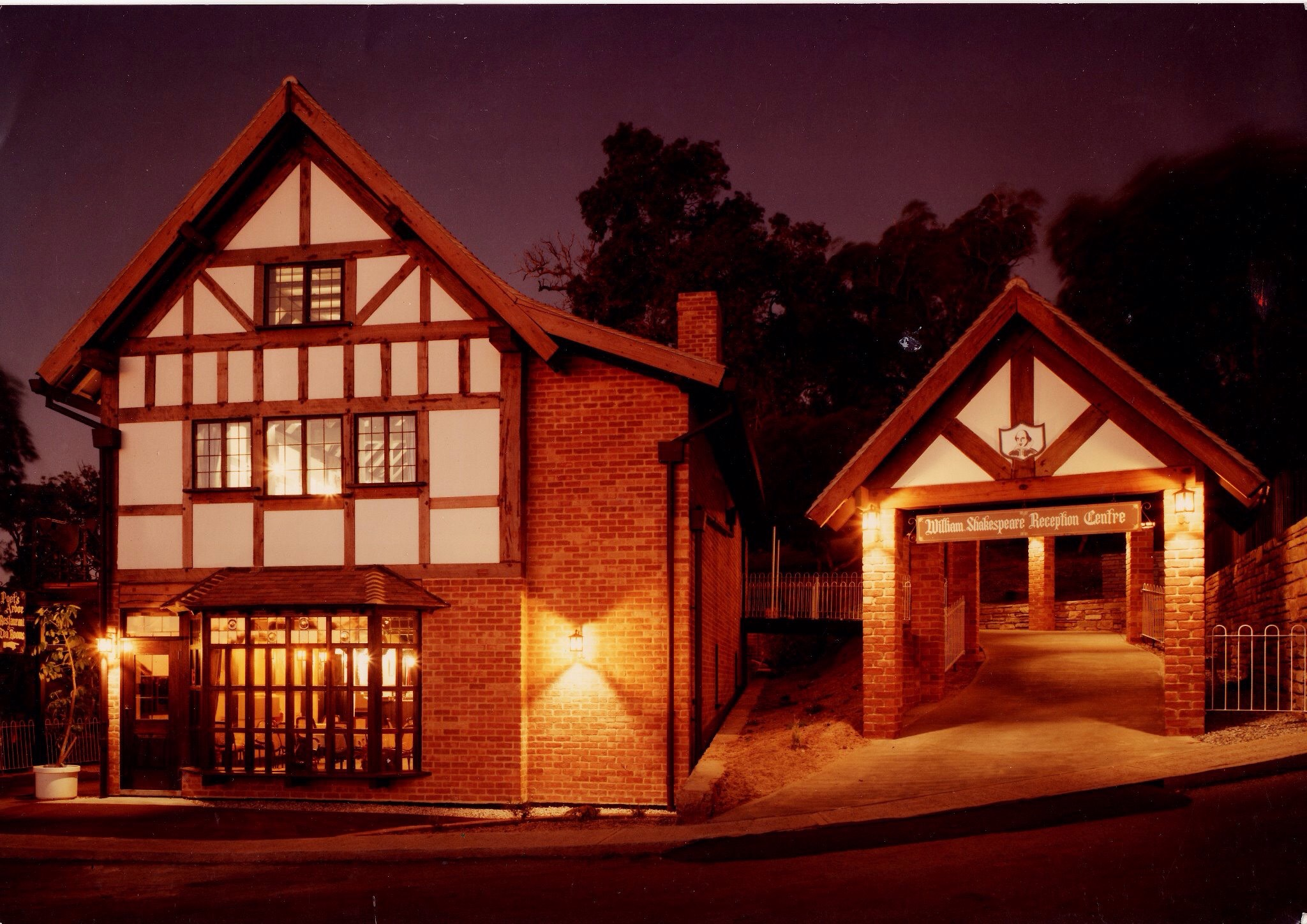
- Cobweb Restaurant and William Shakespeare Reception Centre
- Interactive map of Bedfordale
- Coordinates: 32.172°S 116.047°E
- Country: Australia
- State: Western Australia
- City: Perth
- LGA: City of Armadale
- Location: 34 km (21 mi) from Perth; 6 km (3.7 mi) from Armadale

Government
  - State electorate: Darling Range
  - Federal division: Bullwinkel

Area
  - Total: 49 km^{2} (19 sq mi)

Population
  - Total: 3,038 (SAL 2021)
- Postcode: 6112
Suburbs around Bedfordale
Mount Nasura	Roleystone	Roleystone
Mount Richon	Bedfordale	Ashendon
Byford	Karrakup	Karrakup

Bedfordale is a semi-rural suburb in the south-east of Perth, Western Australia, located within the City of Armadale. Located approximately 40 km from Perth in the Darling Range, some of the local attractions include Churchman Brook Dam, Wungong Dam and the Elizabethan Pub. The area is popular for hiking and cycling. Being close to Armadale railway station provides easy access to the city by train, however Bedfordale is not served by any public transport.

It was first named as a townsite in 1905.

The area is named after Admiral Sir Frederick Denham Bedford (1838–1913), Governor of Western Australia from 24 March 1903 to 22 April 1909. Governor Bedford chose some of the older street names to commemorate several famous Admirals.

The suburb hosts the Elizabethan Village which has full size replicas of Anne Hathaway's cottage and Shakespeare's Birthplace, built by British engineer Leo Fowler in the 1970s.
