= Electoral district of Armadale =

State electoral district in Perth, Western Australia

Armadale Western Australia—Legislative Assembly
- Interactive map of district boundaries from the 2025 state election
- State: Western Australia
- Dates current: 1983–present
- MP: Tony Buti
- Party: Labor
- Namesake: Armadale
- Electors: 32,680 (2025)
- Area: 40 km^{2} (15.4 sq mi)
- Demographic: Metropolitan
- Coordinates: 32.13°S 116.01°E
Electorates around Armadale:
Southern River	Thornlie; Southern River	Thornlie
Oakford	Armadale	Darling Range
Oakford	Darling Range	Darling Range

Armadale is a Legislative Assembly electorate in the state of Western Australia. The district is named for the southeastern Perth suburb of Armadale, which falls within its borders.

== History ==
Armadale was created at the 1982 redistribution out of parts of the seats of Dale and Gosnells. It was first contested in the 1983 election, in which Labor member Bob Pearce, who had previously represented Gosnells, was successful. The seat has been regarded as very safe for the Labor Party since its creation, and at the 2001 election, the Liberal Party did not field a candidate for the seat. It was held from 1996 until 2010 by Alannah MacTiernan, the Minister for Planning and Infrastructure in the Gallop and Carpenter governments.

On 25 June 2010, MacTiernan resigned from the Western Australian Legislative Assembly to run for the federal seat of Canning. A by-election occurred on 2 October 2010 and Labor candidate Tony Buti was elected. Buti was re-elected at the state elections in 2013 and 2017. In the latter election, he increased his majority to 25.2 percent, making Armadale the safest seat in the legislature.

== Geography ==
As of 2025 Armadale is based mostly around the built-up Armadale suburban area, with Tonkin Highway forming a boundary to the northwest. The boundaries contain the suburbs of Armadale, Camillo, Champion Lakes, Kelmscott, Mount Nasura and Seville Grove as well as parts of Mount Richon.

The 2007 redistribution, which took effect at the 2008 election, resulted in the seat losing eastern Kelmscott as well as Wungong and Forrestdale. At the time Armadale was bounded by the Tonkin Highway to the northwest, the Canning River to the northeast, and the limits of the Armadale suburban area to the south and southeast. Its boundaries included the suburbs of Armadale, Brookdale, Champion Lakes, Hilbert, Mount Nasura, Mount Richon, Seville Grove and Camillo, as well as Kelmscott west of the Canning River.

Armadale was left unchanged until the 2023 redistribution, where population growth in the south-western part of the seat accelerated to the point that a new seat was created in the form of Oakford. The suburbs of Brookdale, Haynes and Hilbert were transferred to the new seat while regaining the part of Kelmscott east of the Canning River from Darling Range.

== Members for Armadale ==
Member	Party	Term
Bob Pearce	Labor	1983–1993
Kay Hallahan	Labor	1993–1996
Alannah MacTiernan	Labor	1996–2010
Tony Buti	Labor	2010–present

== Election results ==
2025 Western Australian state election: Armadale
Party	Candidate	Votes	%	±%
Labor	Tony Buti	13,141	52.5	−20.6
Liberal	Jason McNamara	4,374	17.5	+8.4
Greens	Shelley Harrington	3,033	12.1	+7.4
One Nation	Elizabeth Ierardi	2,060	8.2	+5.6
Christians	Arthur Kleyn	1,750	7.0	+1.5
Stop Pedophiles	C. Ling	673	2.7	+2.7
Total formal votes		25,031	94.6	−0.8
Informal votes		1,441	5.4	+0.8
Turnout		26,472	81.0	+2.5
Two-party-preferred result
Labor	Tony Buti	17,223	68.9	−15.0
Liberal	Jason McNamara	7,792	31.1	+15.0
Labor hold		Swing	−15.0	

== See also ==
- City of Armadale
