= Tonkin Highway =

Highway in Perth, Western Australia

Tonkin Highway Western Australia
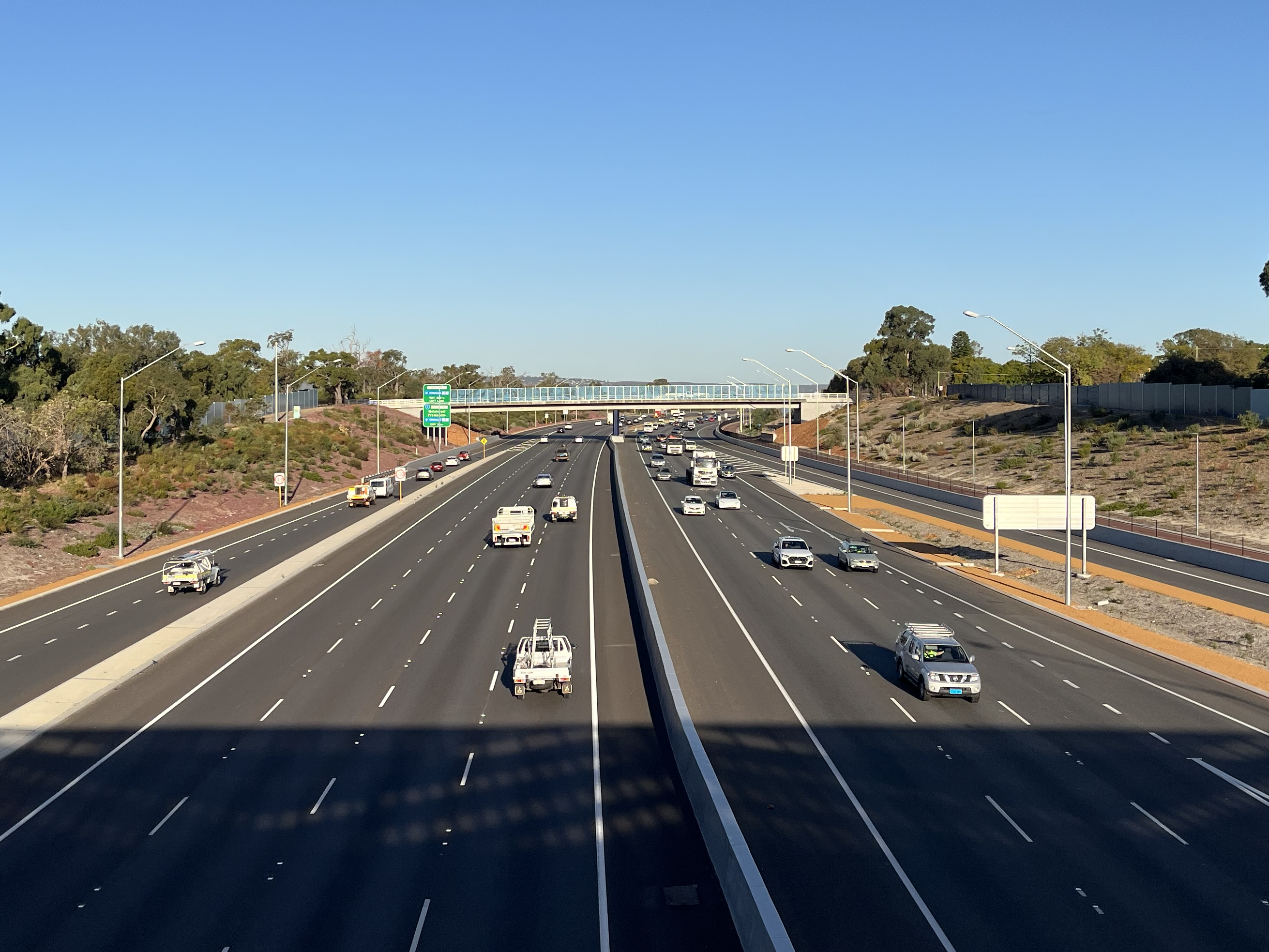
- Tonkin Highway in Redcliffe

General information
- Type: Highway
- Length: 81 km (50 mi)
- Opened: 1980
- Maintained by: Main Roads Western Australia
- Route number(s): State Route 4

Major junctions
- North end: Great Northern Highway (National Highway 94 / National Route 1)/ Brand Highway (National Route 1), Muchea
- Gnangara Road, (State Route 84); Reid Highway (State Route 3); Great Eastern Highway (National Highway 94 / National Route 1); Leach Highway (State Route 7); Roe Highway (State Route 3); Albany Highway (State Route 30)
- South end: Thomas Road (State Route 21), Oakford

Location(s)
- Major suburbs: Bullsbrook, Ellenbrook, Bayswater, Perth Airport, Forrestfield, Maddington, Gosnells, Champion Lakes

Highway system
- Highways in Australia; National Highway • Freeways in Australia; Highways in Western Australia

Tonkin Highway is an 81-kilometre-long (50 mi) north–south highway and partial freeway in Perth, Western Australia, linking Perth Airport and Kewdale with the city's north-eastern and south-eastern suburbs. As of April 2020, the northern terminus is at the interchange with Brand Highway and Great Northern Highway in Muchea, and the southern terminus is at Thomas Road in Oakford. It forms the entire length of State Route 4, and connects to several major roads. Besides Brand Highway and Great Northern Highway, it also connects to Reid Highway, Great Eastern Highway, Leach Highway, Roe Highway, and Albany Highway.

Planning for the route began in the 1950s, but the first segment between Wattle Grove and Cloverdale was not opened until 1980. Over the next five years, the highway was extended north to Great Eastern Highway and south to Albany Highway, and a discontinuous section was constructed north of the Swan River. In 1988 the Redcliffe Bridge linked these sections, and three years later, Reid Highway became the northern terminus. The next major works on the highway, between 2003 and 2005, extended the highway south to Thomas Road.

The central section of Tonkin Highway was upgraded to a six-lane freeway-standard road between 2013 and 2015, as part of the Gateway WA project to improve the wider road network around Perth Airport. From 2016 to 2020, construction commenced to upgrade the section of Tonkin Highway between Guildford Road and the original Reid Highway terminus to a six-lane freeway-standard road, and to build a four-lane freeway standard road up to Muchea, as part of the NorthLink WA project. The extension was originally known as the Perth Darwin National Highway. Planning provisions have been made for Tonkin Highway to be extended south of Byford in the future.

== Route description ==
Tonkin Highway forms the entire length of State Route 4. It is a dual carriageway road maintained by Main Roads Western Australia, and subject to control of access (Note: In Western Australia, control of access restricts access to the road to specified points, and revokes the right of adjoining land from having direct vehicle and pedestrian access. Junctions are not required to be grade-separated. "Controlled access highways" are referred to as either freeways, or freeway-standard roads.) along its entire length. Some junctions on the highway are at-grade and traffic light controlled; however, all junctions north of Hale Road in Wattle Grove and junctions with Albany Highway and Corfield Street in Gosnells, are freeway-standard with grade-separated interchanges. The central section of the highway between Reid Highway and Roe Highway is primarily six lanes wide; the remainder of the highway is primarily four lanes wide. The speed limit is 80 kilometres per hour (50 mph) near at-grade intersections, and 100 km/h (60 mph) along the stretches in between with 110 km/h (70 mph) north of Ellenbrook. A shared pedestrian and bicycle path is built alongside most of Tonkin Highway; namely between Muchea and Hale Road, as well as south of Mills Road East. In most other sections, the highway's sealed shoulders also function as bicycle lanes.

Main Roads Western Australia monitors traffic volume across the state's road network, including several locations along Tonkin Highway. The section near Perth Airport, south of Great Eastern Highway, is the busiest, averaging over 56,000 vehicles per weekday in 2007–08, and over 57,000 in 2008–09. North of the Swan River, the traffic volume gradually decreased to under 40,000 vehicles per weekday near the northern terminus, in 2007–08. Measurements in 2008–09 showed the lowest volume to be under 10,000 vehicles per weekday near the southern terminus, north of Thomas Road.

In 2013, immediately preceding the upgrade of Tonkin Highway's central section to a six-lane freeway-standard road, junctions in and around Kewdale, Forrestfield and Perth Airport carried traffic volumes beyond their capacity during peak periods. Average peak period traffic speeds in this part of Tonkin Highway were measured as 20 km/h (12 mph) or less in 2013. The slowest section was from Leach Highway to Horrie Miller Drive, which recorded an average of 14 km/h (9 mph) during the afternoon peak period. Traffic volume, exceeding 50,000 vehicles per day in 2012, is forecast to almost double by 2031. Traffic modelling showed that leaving the current network of traffic light controlled intersections in place would have resulted in gridlock by 2021. Following the completion of the Gateway WA project in 2015, the upgraded road network is forecast to have an average speed in peak periods of between 55 and 75 km/h (35 and 45 mph) in 2021.

=== Muchea to Ellenbrook ===
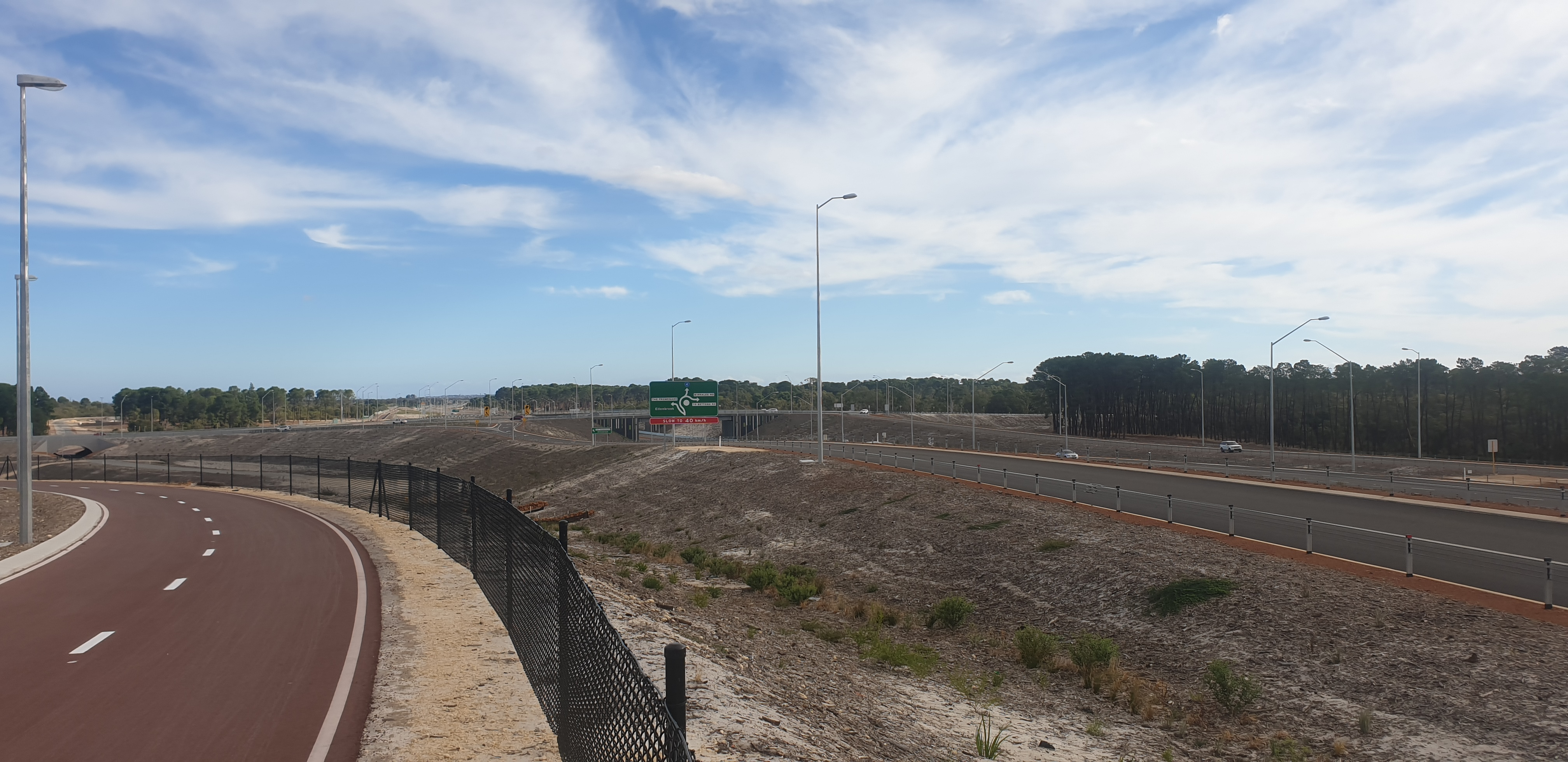
Interchange of Tonkin Highway and The Promenade/Birralee Road in 2020

Tonkin Highway commences at a roundabout interchange with Brand Highway and Great Northern Highway near the town of Muchea in the Shire of Chittering of the Wheatbelt region. The highway is a continuation of Great Northern Highway to/from the north of Western Australia with direction signage including Port Hedland some 1,550 km (960 mi) away. The interchange is characterised by both the installation of curvy green street lighting known as "wiggle poles" on both the bridge passing over the roundabout as well as on the westbound approach to the roundabout as well as a large road train assembly area to the southeast of the interchange.

After 1 km (0.62 mi), Tonkin Highway passes over the old Brand Highway connection between Muchea and Great Northern Highway (now known as Granary Drive) before curving to the southwest to pass over Muchea South Road and the Midland railway line. The highway then enters the Perth metropolitan region (the City of Swan LGA, or local government area) and provides a western bypass of the town of Bullsbrook. The highway curves back to the south to pass over a roundabout interchange with Neaves Road. After 5 km (3.1 mi), Tonkin Highway passes over another roundabout interchange with Stock Road West on the eastern side and Cooper Road on the west. A Heavy Vehicle Inspection Area is located immediately to the south.

After a further 5 km (3.1 mi) Tonkin Highway curves to the south-west, upon which the farmland that dominated the first section of the highway gives way to the more undulating and less fertile Bassendean dune system. The transition is marked by the presence of a fauna overpass crossing the highway. Just south of the overpass the highway starts skirting the western edge of the major suburb of Ellenbrook for the next 5 km (3.1 mi).

=== Ellenbrook to the Swan River ===
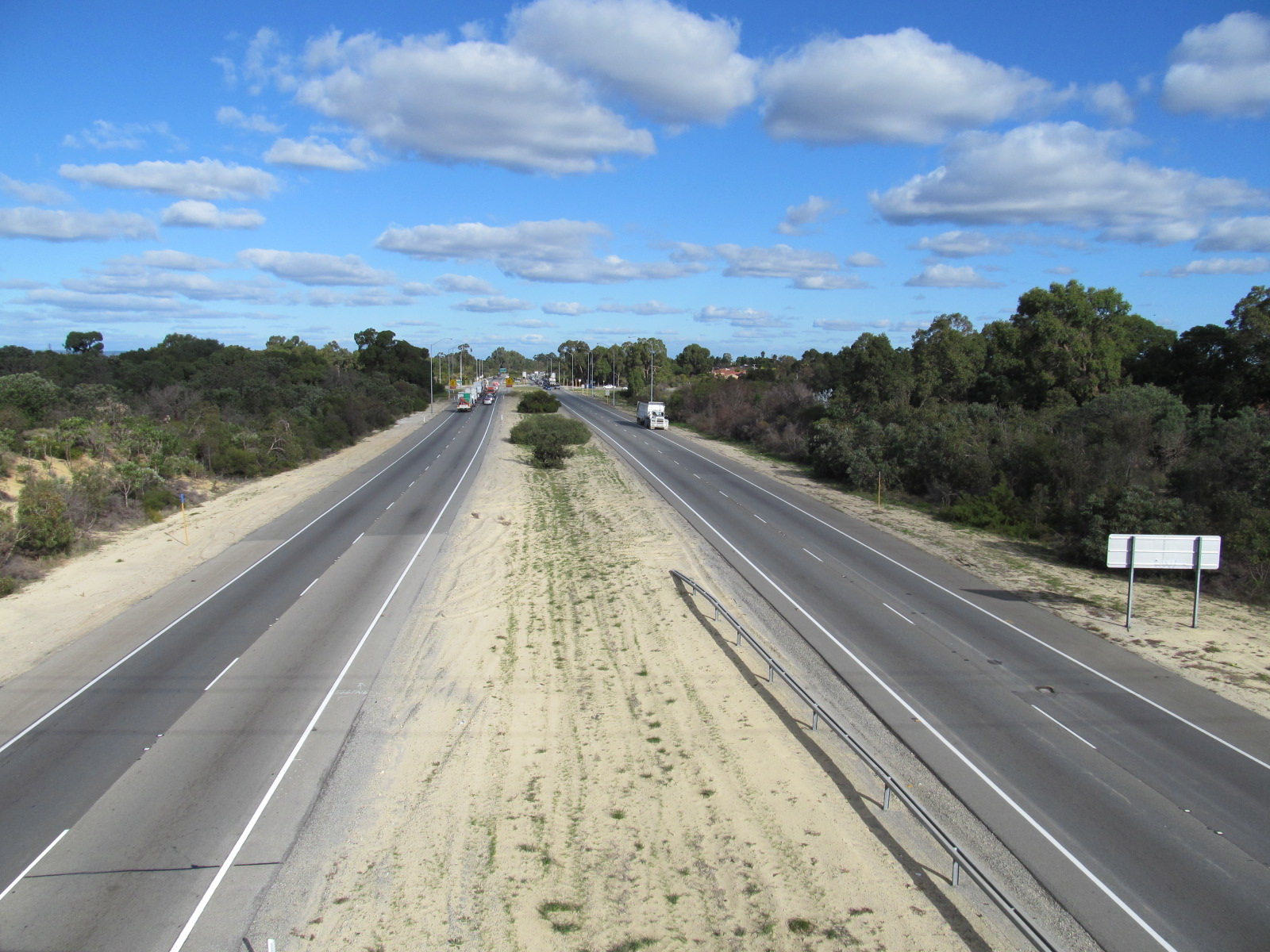
View south along Tonkin Highway in Noranda in 2012.

Tonkin Highway then descends from the dunes to cross under a roundabout interchange with The Promenade to the east and Birralee Road to the west in Ellenbrook, after which it continues southwest and meets Gnangara Road at a parclo interchange. The highway then curves back to the south and passes between the suburbs of Cullacabardee and Whiteman, replacing a section of Beechboro Road North. The highway heads south to cross over Baal Street, after which another roundabout interchange is reached with Hepburn Avenue and the remainder of Beechboro Road North. Around 700 metres (0.43 mi) south of the interchange the Ellenbrook line enters the median from the northeast, with both road and rail soon passing underneath Marshall Road. Tonkin Highway then arrives at a major free-flowing combination interchange with Reid Highway, previously the northern terminus of the highway. The wiggle pole street lighting reappears here, though the lights are yellow in colour this time. The highway then gains an additional lane and continues southwards, forming the border between the residential suburbs of Beechboro and Noranda; after 150 metres (490 ft), the highway enters the City of Bayswater LGA. The highway travels south for 400 metres (0.25 mi) to both Benara Road and Noranda station, which Tonkin Highway passes under. The south-eastern corner of Noranda is 400 metres (0.25 mi) south of the flyover, leaving the highway entirely within Morley. Tonkin Highway continues south through the residential area for 1.1 kilometres (0.68 mi), and reaches a roundabout interchange, with Morley Drive and Morley Drive East.

Tonkin Highway continues southwards through a narrow S curve that realigns the highway further east. Partway through the curve, 800 metres (0.50 mi) south of Morley Drive, the highway passes under Broun Avenue and Morley station, though there is no access between the roads. At this point the highway enters the north-eastern corner of Embleton, travels through it for 400 metres (0.25 mi), and then enters Bayswater. The border between Embleton and Bayswater follows Beechboro Road, which is discontinuous either side of Tonkin Highway. The highway continues through Bayswater, between residential housing to the north-east and an industrial area to the south-west. After 500 metres (0.31 mi) the S curve ends, with the highway now travelling between industrial and commercial properties. There is another interchange, this time a single-point urban interchange 400 metres (1,300 ft) further south, with Collier Road. The Ellenbrook line deviates and exits to the southwest 500 metres (1,600 ft) south of the interchange, with the highway forming collector-distributor lanes prior to the next major interchange with Guildford Road, 1.2 kilometres (0.75 mi) further south. It is connected via a grade-separated interchange folded diamond interchange, with all the ramps located south of Guildford Road; to the north is the Midland railway line, and the parallel road Railway Parade, which the highway passes over. From here the highway turns south-easterly, perpendicular to the Swan River, and travels through another residential part of Bayswater for 1.2 kilometres (0.75 mi). Tonkin Highway crosses the river via the 270-metre-long (890 ft) Mooro-Beeloo Bridge, which takes the highway into Ascot, in the City of Belmont LGA.

=== Perth Airport ===
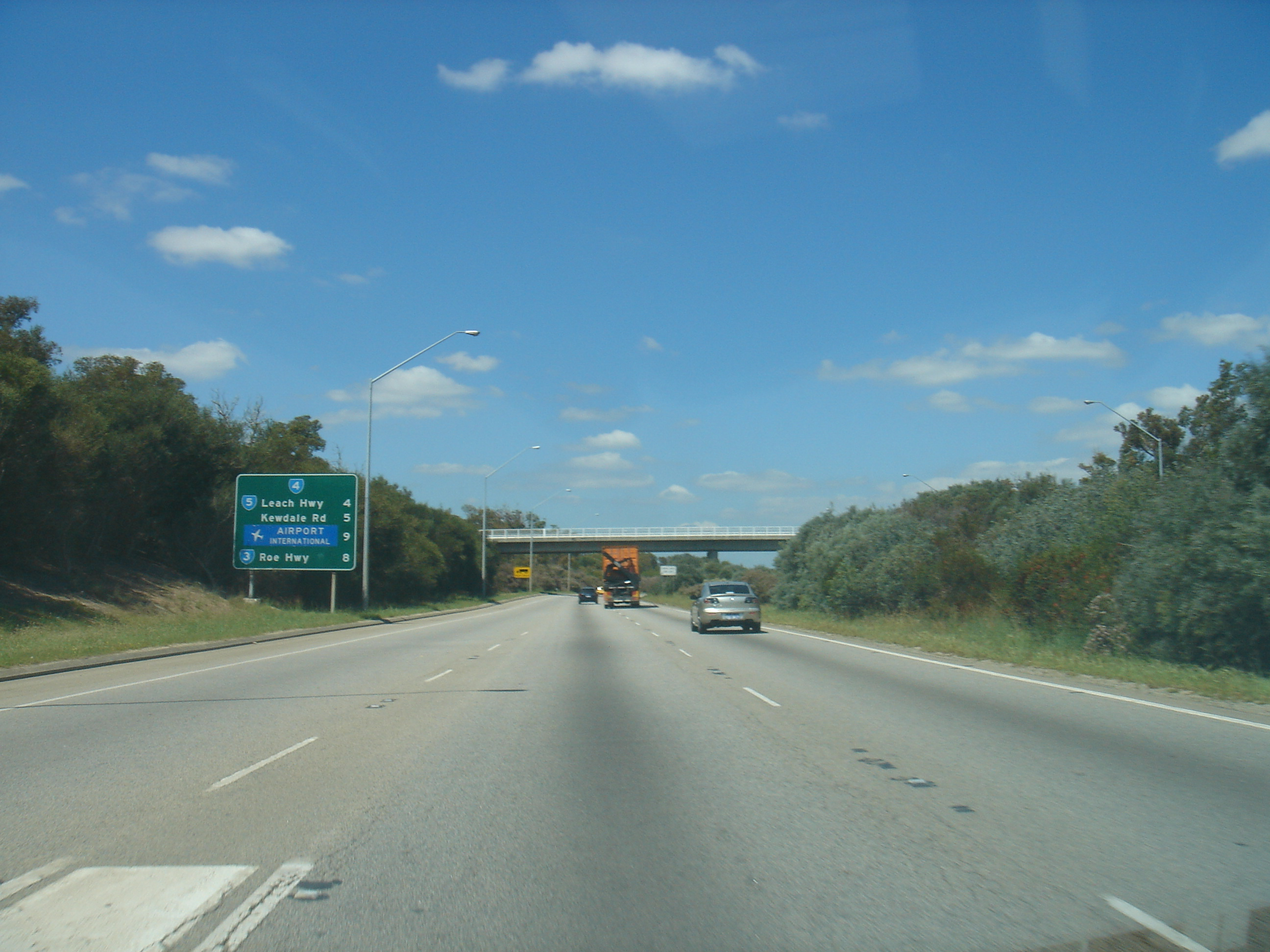
A freeway standard section of Tonkin Highway, south of Great Eastern Highway

A grade-separated interchange with Great Eastern Highway is located 350 metres (1,150 ft) south-east of the Mooro-Beeloo Bridge. It is a parclo interchange, with the eastbound to southbound and westbound to northbound entry ramps looped. Previously, Great Eastern Highway's intersection with the southbound exit ramp also connected to Brearley Avenue which, until September 2018, provided one of the main access roads to Perth Airport's domestic terminal. However Brearley Avenue was closed to allow construction on the Redcliffe railway station. Beyond this interchange, Tonkin Highway, once again with three lanes, is within Redcliffe's residential areas. A further 750 metres (0.47 mi) takes the highway to the edge of the suburb of Perth Airport, where it becomes the border between Redcliffe to the south-west and Perth Airport to the north-east. Five hundred metres (0.31 mi) later, the highway approaches the interchange with Dunreath Drive. Dunreath Drive replaced the Brearley Avenue entrance as the main access road from Tonkin Highway to Perth Airport's domestic terminal in 2015, it is a partial dogbone interchange, with the eastern side free-flowing while the western side controlled with a roundabout.

After 500 metres (0.31 mi), the highway turns south, travelling in that direction for 1.1 kilometres (0.68 mi) before reaching Cloverdale and curving back to the south-east, meeting Leach Highway and Airport Drive. Known as the Grand Gateway interchange, it is the primary access to Perth Airport's international terminal (replacing Horrie Miller Drive in 2015). It is a modified three-level combination interchange with two loop ramps (Airport Drive west to Tonkin Highway north and Leach Highway east to Tonkin Highway south). These movements, along with another five of the eight available between the three roads are free-flowing. Only Tonkin Highway north to Leach Highway west is controlled by traffic lights at the subsequent Leach Highway/Abernethy Road interchange before entering the highway itself to minimise the danger posed by weaving. The interchange is only 13.9 metres (46 ft) high, its height limited by the airport runway to its north with tunnelling not possible due to the high water table in the vicinity. It is located at the borders between three suburbs: Cloverdale to the west, Kewdale to the south, and the Perth Airport to the north-east.

Beyond Leach Highway, Tonkin Highway continues past industrial properties for 1.3 kilometres (0.81 mi), reaching the interchange with Kewdale Road to the south-west, and Horrie Miller Drive to the north-east. Now a single-point urban interchange, the initial signalised intersection was the original primary access road for Perth Airport's international terminals. Horrie Miller Drive now serves the industrial areas south of the terminal, and provides a secondary access to the terminals. After another 1.4 kilometres (0.87 mi), the highway reaches Abernethy Road. The only connections are a north-westbound looped exit ramp that merges with a local road, McDowell Street, north of Abernethy Road and a south-eastbound entrance ramp built in 2014. Beyond this intersection, the highway enters the City of Kalamunda LGA, and is the location of the border between the suburbs of Kewdale to the south-east and Forrestfield to the north-east. It continues along the border for 900 metres (0.56 mi), until it reaches Roe Highway, which marks the border between Kewdale and Wattle Grove, on the south-western side of Tonkin Highway. Initially built as a signalised diamond interchange favouring Tonkin Highway, the Gateway WA project has since modified the connection into a hybrid diamond-stack interchange, with all Tonkin Highway southbound movements free-flowing, along with both left turns from Roe to Tonkin Highway.

=== Forrestfield to Oakford ===
Tonkin Highway travels in a south-easterly direction between residential areas in Forrestfield and Wattle Grove, reaching Hale Road after 1.2 kilometres (0.75 mi). Over the next 1.5 kilometres (0.93 mi), the highway curves back to the south. At this point it intersects Welshpool Road East, and is entirely within the suburb of Wattle Grove. Beyond this intersection, Tonkin Highway continues south-east as the border between the semi-rural areas of Kenwick to the west, and Wattle Grove to the east. This is also the border between the City of Gosnells and City of Kalamunda LGAs, which the highway follows for 1.9 kilometres (1.2 mi). It then reaches the suburbs of Maddington, located west of the highway, and Orange Grove, east of the highway, and from this point on, is entirely within the City of Gosnells. After 750 metres (0.47 mi), the highway crosses Kelvin Road, and continues south-east for a further 2.8 kilometres (1.7 mi). It briefly passes the industrial part of Maddington, before curving slightly around an urban development to reach intersections with Gosnells Road East, and subsequently Gosnells Road West. These are a pair of T-junctions, 260 metres (850 ft) apart; only the junction with Gosnells Road West is traffic-light controlled. Tonkin Highway follows a gentle reverse curve southwards through Martin for 2.1 kilometres (1.3 mi), once more within a semi-rural environment, before reaching a set of traffic lights with Mills Road East and West. Tonkin Highway crosses the Canning River 1.4 kilometres (0.87 mi) further south, entering Gosnells. It then curves south-west towards Albany Highway, 650 metres (0.40 mi) away.

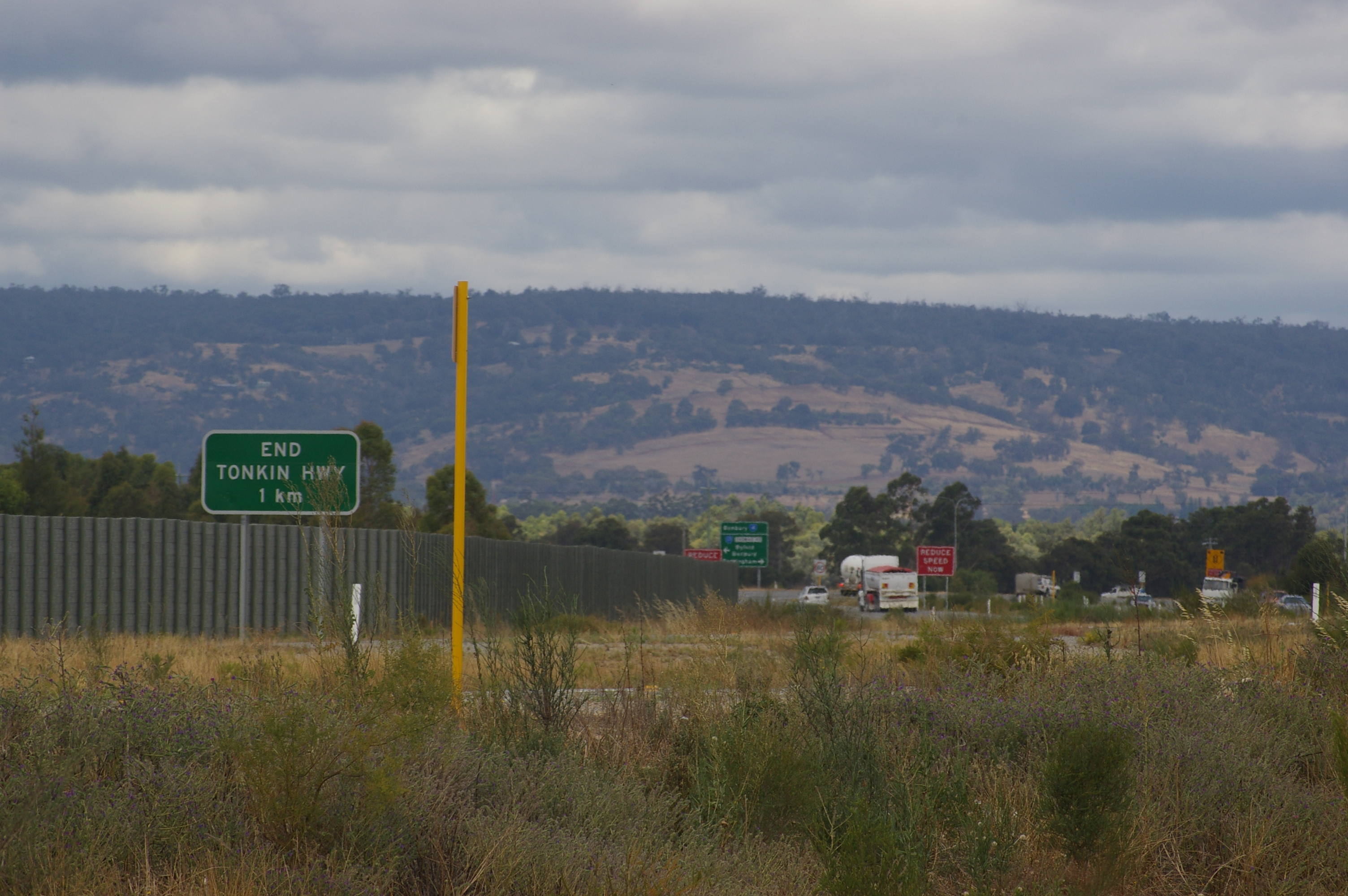
Approach to the southern end at Thomas Road, Oakford before the Southern extension works started in 2026

Tonkin Highway meets Albany Highway at a folded diamond interchange. The highway splits into local and express lanes on approach to this interchange, and continues in this configuration for 600 metres (0.37 mi). At this point there is a dogbone interchange with Corfield Street, with the highway now marking the boundary between the suburbs of Gosnells and Champion Lakes, as well as the City of Gosnells and City of Armadale LGAs. It continues south-westbound, passing between Champion Lakes to the south-east, and undeveloped land to the north-west. After 3.3 kilometres (2.1 mi), there is a T junction with Champion Drive. The highway continues southwest for another 2.7 kilometres (1.7 mi) until it reaches a set of traffic lights with Ranford Road. Afterwards it is entirely within the City of Armadale LGA, and the suburb of Forrestdale. Tonkin Highway turns south, along a two-kilometre-long (1.2 mi) curve, and meets Armadale Road at another set of traffic lights. The highway continues south through rural land, between Forrestdale to the west, and Haynes and Hilbert to the east. It passes Forrest Road after 1.5 kilometres (0.93 mi), only connecting to the eastern leg at a T junction, and 2.2 kilometres (1.4 mi) further on, reaches Rowley Road. Following this traffic controlled intersection, Tonkin Highway is within the Shire of Serpentine-Jarrahdale LGA. The highway follows the eastern edge of Oakford for 3.2 kilometres (2.0 mi), past low density residential lots. Tonkin Highway ends at Thomas Road, which connects traffic to Kwinana Freeway and South Western Highway.

== History ==
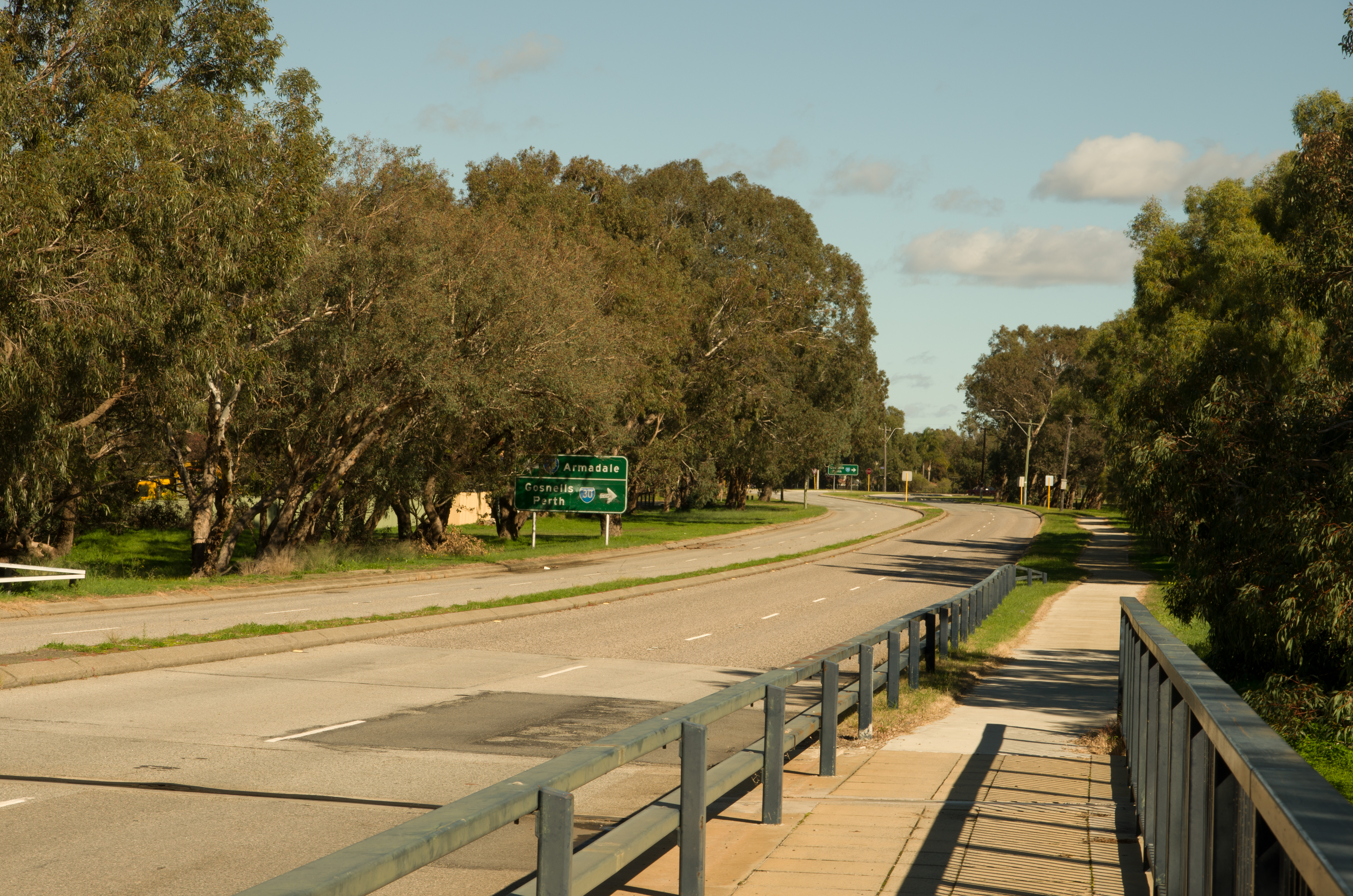
View south along Ferres Drive in Gosnells, towards Albany Highway. This road is a former section of Tonkin Highway that was bypassed when the extension to Thomas Road was constructed.

A proposal for a highway along a similar alignment was first proposed in 1955, as part of a network of arterial roads under a metropolitan-wide plan produced for the Western Australian government by Gordon Stephenson and Alastair Hepburn. The road reservation was formally gazetted in the 1963 Metropolitan Region Scheme. It was first named "Beechboro-Gosnells Highway", the name coming from the two suburbs it was originally planned to link. Like most Perth arterial road projects, the highway was built in stages. It was initially constructed as a 3.3-kilometre-long (2.1 mi) dual carriageway, from Welshpool Road, Wattle Grove to Hardey Road in Cloverdale, which opened on 16 June 1980. A further 12.2 kilometres (7.6 mi), that linked the new highway to Albany Highway in Gosnells, was completed in December 1980. This $6.1 million section, which officially opened on 22 December 1980, was the start of a new route between Gosnells and Bellevue, (Note: This new route was a north–south link along Perth's foothills, composed of Tonkin Highway from Gosnells to Forrestfield, and Roe Highway from Forrestfield to Bellevue. This section of Roe Highway was also built in the early 1980s.) and reduced traffic volume and congestion on Albany Highway.

The third segment to be constructed was a 3.6-kilometre-long (2.2 mi) section north of the Swan River, from Railway Parade in Bayswater to Morley Drive, which opened on 11 July 1984. This $3.5 million section was constructed by Thiess Contractors Pty Ltd, with Taylor Woodrow International Ltd responsible for constructing the Broun Avenue bridge. Stage 4 linked Hardey Road and Great Eastern Highway, and included the construction of four bridges over the Forrestfield Marshalling Yard, the first bridges in Australia to be constructed using the incremental launch technique. Upon opening on 1 May 1985, Beechboro-Gosnells Highway was renamed "Tonkin Highway", in honour of former Premier of Western Australia John Tonkin. Tonkin had also been the Minister for Works during the planning and construction of the Narrows Bridge and Kwinana Freeway in the 1950s. A ceremony was held at Redcliffe on 1 May by the Premier of Western Australia Brian Burke, who unveiled a plaque. Tonkin, who at the time was aged 83, cut the ribbon at the ceremony to officially open the new Forrestfield to Redcliffe section of the highway. A grade-separated interchange was constructed at Great Eastern Highway in 1986, which included a six lane road bridge over Tonkin Highway and a pedestrian subway. It was constructed earlier than initially planned, as heavy traffic from Perth Airport was expected during the 1987 America's Cup.

View south along Tonkin Highway, from the Mooro-Beeloo Bridge to Great Eastern Highway

Construction on a link between the northern and southern sections of Tonkin Highway began in 1988. Included in this $48 million stage was the Redcliffe Bridge (now known as the Mooro-Beeloo Bridge) over the Swan River, and an interchange with Guildford Road, north of the bridge. The 270-metre-long (890 ft) Redcliffe Bridge, also built using the incremental launching technique, was designed to carry six traffic lanes, as well as pedestrian and cycle paths that could be converted into traffic lanes when required. The bridge deck is supported by a narrow central section with cantilever extensions on each side, as a "big heavy bridge would have looked out of place" at a relatively narrow section of the river. The bridge was designed by Maunsell and Partners Pty Ltd and constructed by Thiess. It was opened on 16 April 1988, and received awards for engineering excellence from both the national and state branches of the Institute of Engineers, Australia.

The highway was then extended northwards, reaching Benara Road on 18 December 1989, and Reid Highway on 11 November 1991. Tonkin Highway spent a decade remaining largely unchanged, linking Reid Highway in Malaga with Albany Highway in Gosnells. In 2003, construction of a new southern extension commenced. Planning and Infrastructure Minister Alannah MacTiernan and the Member for Roleystone, Martin Whitely, participated in a sod turning ceremony on 27 June 2003, to mark the start of the project. At the time, the $140 million extension was the largest single road project in Western Australia. The project was completed in two stages, with Armadale Road as the midpoint. The first 11-kilometre-long (6.8 mi) section, including a new interchange at Albany Highway, was opened by Premier Geoff Gallop and Alannah MacTiernan on 2 April 2005. The original connection to Albany Highway was renamed Ferres Drive. The Forrestdale Business Park and the Champion Lakes precinct were constructed concurrently with the project, to encourage industrial and residential development alongside the new highway section. The remaining seven kilometres (4.3 mi), from Armadale Road through to Thomas Road, opened a year ahead of schedule on 16 December 2005. The new extension improved links with Kwinana, Armadale, Rockingham and Byford. It also provided a new freight route, diverting heavy vehicle traffic away from the existing road network and residential areas.

=== Gateway WA ===
At-grade intersection of Tonkin and Leach Highways in 2013

Between 2014 and 2016, the $1 billion Gateway WA Perth Airport and Freight Access Project was undertaken to upgrade the road network around Perth Airport. At the time it was the largest project Main Roads Western Australia had ever undertaken, covering the upgrade of Tonkin and Leach highways, and the construction of four new interchanges. The project was jointly funded by state and federal governments, which provided $317.5 million and $686.4 million respectively.

External videos
- Animated flyover video showing the planned upgrades (WMV) from Main Roads Western Australia

As part of the project, Tonkin Highway was expanded from two to three lanes in both directions, between Great Eastern Highway and Roe Highway, with the existing intersections in this section becoming grade separated. A new diamond interchange was constructed with Dunreath Drive to provide access to Perth Airport Terminals 3 and 4, the domestic terminal precinct, thus replacing Brearley Avenue as the main access to the precinct.

Access to Terminals 1 and 2, the international terminal precinct, was provided via the Grand Gateway, a freeway-to-freeway combination interchange at Leach Highway and the newly built Airport Drive. The Horrie Miller Drive and Kewdale Road intersection, formerly one of Perth's busiest intersections, was also replaced by a single-point urban interchange; providing an alternate route to the international terminals, as well as improving access to the Kewdale industrial area and freight facilities at Perth Airport. The existing diamond interchange with Roe Highway was upgraded to a partial freeway-to-freeway interchange, but with plans to further upgrade it to a completely free-flowing interchange in the future.

In January 2013, works were undertaken to protect or relocate sections of the Canning Trunk water main and the Dampier to Bunbury Natural Gas Pipeline in the vicinity of the project. Construction on the Gateway WA project officially began on 1 February 2013 with a groundbreaking ceremony attended by the state and federal transport ministers, Troy Buswell and Anthony Albanese. The whole project was due to be completed by 2017. However it was moved to March 2016, due to construction moving faster than expected. Works were finished on 12 April 2016.

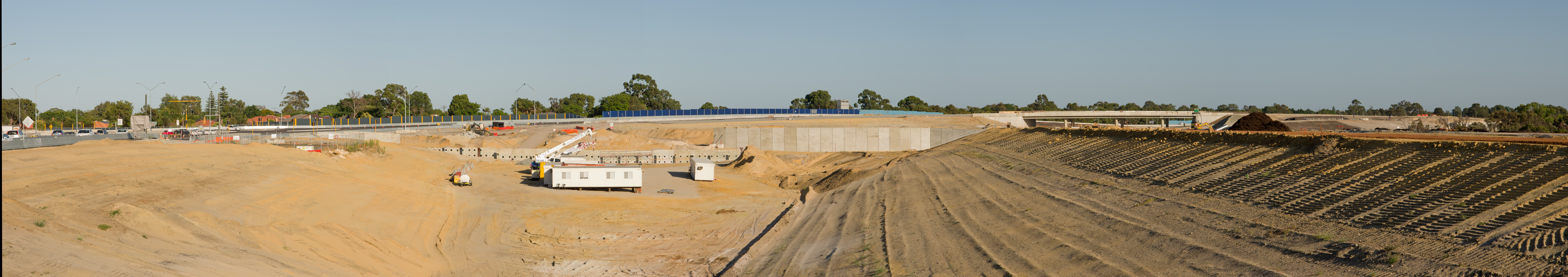
Leach Highway interchange under construction in January 2015

=== Intersection Upgrades ===
During 2016, the intersection with Gosnells Road West was upgraded with longer and extra turning lanes, better cycling and pedestrian facilities, and better street lighting and CCTV as part of the Black Spot program. This project was funded by the Western Australian State government, and cost $2.4 million. During 2016 and 2017, as part of Main Roads Western Australia's Traffic Congestion Management Program, the intersection with Kelvin Road was upgraded to improve traffic flow and safety. New and longer turning lanes were added. This project cost $7.5 million and was funded by the Western Australian state government.

=== NorthLink WA ===
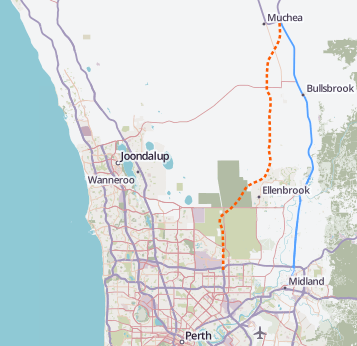
Map showing the route (dashed orange line) of the Tonkin Highway extension (formerly the Perth Darwin National Highway or Swan Valley bypass) carried out during 2016–2020.

NorthLink WA was a project that involved both the northern section of Tonkin Highway upgraded, and the road extended northwards to bypass Great Northern Highway within Perth and the wider Swan Valley. These two component projects are separately funded, with both the state and federal governments contributing to each project. Construction began in 2016, and was completed on 23 April 2020.

==== Intersection Upgrades ====
The federal government allocated $140.6 million to grade-separate Tonkin Highway's intersections south of Reid Highway, namely Benara Road, Morley Drive and Collier Road. The funding is part of the next five-year phase of the Nation Building Program, from 2014–15 to 2018–19. The upgrades are intended to improve freight transportation along the highway. The total cost is expected to be $281.2 million. In the lead up to the 2013 Australian federal election, which resulted in a change of government, Labor candidate for Perth, Alannah MacTiernan, accused the then-opposition's candidate of lying to the electorate over their commitment to the upgrade. The official policy costings did not contain specific funding for the project. However, an opposition spokesperson claimed it was "in the current forward estimates", and not in the costing, as the upgrade was neither a "new and accelerated" project, nor a project that would definitely not be funded.

==== Northern extension ====
Construction started in June 2017 to extend Tonkin Highway north, past Ellenbrook and through the Swan Valley to Brand Highway and Great Northern Highway in Muchea. Interchanges are planned at junctions with Reid Highway, Hepburn Avenue and Beechboro Road North, Gnangara Road, The Promenade, Stock Road, Neaves Road and Brand Highway and Great Northern Highway. The third stage was originally planned to be a two-lane single-carriageway road with at-grade intersections, with provision for upgrading in the future. However, during the tender process it was found that the ultimate plan with a four-lane highway and grade separation could be completed within the existing budget. The previously planned route of the PDNH, prior to 2012, followed Lord Street, east of Whiteman Park.

The extension was opened in stages: the first section north of Reid Highway between Hepburn Avenue and Gnangara Road opened in January 2019 (which also saw Beechboro Road North between the two roads permanently closed at its northern end) with the section between Reid Highway and Hepburn Avenue making the highway continuous in March. Upon the opening of this section traffic was temporarily diverted onto what was the T-junction with Beechboro Road North and Gnangara Road, before eventually being transferred onto the new interchange. The highway was then extended to The Promenade in August 2019, completing the central section of the project. Following delays, the project as a whole was eventually completed when the northern section officially opened on 23 April 2020.

=== Dunreath Drive ===
Dunreath Drive, a local road that originally ran parallel with Tonkin Highway to the east, provided an alternative route between the Perth Airport terminal buildings. Significant changes were made to the road during the evolution of Tonkin Highway during the 2010s and into 2020.

On 16 April 2012, an intersection linking Dunreath Drive with Tonkin Highway was opened. This traffic light controlled at-grade intersection allowed a more direct access to and from the international terminal of Perth Airport, bypassing Tonkin Highway's intersections with Leach Highway and Kewdale Road/Horrie Miller Drive. However, the intersection did not allow northbound travellers to bypass the Great Eastern Highway interchange in order to access the domestic terminal. The intersection was later removed on 16 July 2015 as part of the work with Gateway WA.

In its place was a dogbone interchange linking Tonkin Highway to Dunreath Drive, allowing full movements to and from the T3/T4 precinct. Since commissioning, the area between the two roads was significantly developed, with a Direct Factory Outlet centre opening in 2018, followed by a Costco in 2020. Due to the increase of traffic the eastern roundabout was removed during the first half of 2020, with the western roundabout seeing peak traffic signals installed.

=== Tonkin Highway "Gap" ===
As a result of the upgrades north and south of the Swan River, the section between the Collier Road and Dunreath Drive interchanges became known as the "Tonkin Gap", where the road reduces from six to four lanes crossing the Swan River over the Redcliffe Bridge, Guildford Road, Railway Parade and the Midland line, creating a bottleneck. Construction began in January 2021 to widen this section of highway to six lanes, as well as build north and southbound collector-distributor roads between Guildford Road interchange and Great Eastern Highway interchange (which also received an additional westbound to northbound loop ramp) and a fully grade separated shared-use path on the western side of Tonkin Highway from north of Guildford Road interchange to Stanton Road.

Following completion of duplication works on Redcliffe Bridge, it was renamed Mooro-Beeloo Bridge in December 2023. The additional lanes opened in late December 2023, with the project officially declared complete in July 2024.

== Future works ==
A number of improvement works are planned for Tonkin Highway, which will see the entire route eventually upgraded to a freeway-standard road with grade separated interchanges. The southern end is also planned to be extended to South Western Highway south of Byford.

=== Roe to Kelvin Upgrade ===
Planning is underway to upgrade Tonkin Highway to freeway standard south of Roe Highway, with the 6-kilometre-long (3.7 mi) section between Roe Highway and Kelvin Road expected to be looked at first. It is planned to widen the highway to six lanes with the intersections with Welshpool Road East and Kelvin Road to be converted to full interchanges as well as construct a new cycle path parallel with the highway. The other at-grade intersection, Hale Road, is provisionally planned to be converted to a half-diamond interchange with northbound-facing ramps connecting to Tonkin Highway through the neighbouring Roe Highway interchange.

=== Southern extension ===
Tonkin Hwy south at Oakford through the Southern extension works at Thomas Road

Tonkin Highway reaches past the edge of suburbia at its southern extent. Planning provides for it to be extended when required. The initial plans indicated the extension would continue south through undeveloped or semi-rural areas such as Mundijong, Cardup and Jarrahdale. South of Mundijong, the planned route would deviate east to terminate at South Western Highway near Jarrahdale Road, which would then be upgraded. Following the 2001 state election, the new government abandoned the Jarrahdale Road option, preferring a shorter route that deviated to South Western Highway near Orton Road, closer to Byford.

In July 2012, seven years after the previous extension was completed, the Minister for Transport announced the formation of a community working group to investigate an extension of Tonkin Highway beyond Thomas Road. The group met several times to identify and evaluate possible solutions to traffic congestion in the area, and prepare a strategic business case for the next extension. As of 19 February 2013, the preferred options are to extend the highway to South Western Highway, at a location either south of Lakes Road or south of Mundijong Road. The latter option was chosen when formal planning commenced in June 2020.

Construction formally commenced on the 14 km southern extension to South Western Highway via Mundijong Road in September 2025 and is expected to be completed in late 2028. At-grade roundabouts are planned for the intersections with Orton Road, Mundijong Road and the planned terminus South Western Highway while grade-separated interchanges are planned for the existing terminus at Thomas Road, as well as Bishop Road due to the proximity to the existing Kwinana freight railway line.

The long-term plan for Tonkin Highway extending southwards, outlined in Perth's transport at 3.5 million plan is for Tonkin Highway to be eventually extended as a freeway standard link to Forrest Highway south of Pinjarra, but no planning has been done for this, and the transport plan has said that this is very far off in the future, and is unlikely to happen until after 2050.

== Interchanges and intersections ==
LGA	Location	km	mi	Destinations	Notes
Chittering	Muchea	0.00	0.00	Brand Highway northwest bound (National Route 1) / Great Northern Highway (National Route 1/National Highway 95) southeast bound – Gingin, Geraldton, Lower Chittering, Swan Valley	Roundabout interchange; northern highway terminus. Continues north as Great Northern Highway (National Highway 95)
Swan	Bullsbrook	10.2	6.3	Neaves Road (State Route 85) – Mariginiup, Joondalup, Bullsbrook	Roundabout interchange.
Swan	Bullsbrook	14.9	9.3	Stock Road eastbound / Cooper Road westbound	Roundabout interchange.
Swan	Lexia	24.9	15.5	The Promenade eastbound / Birralee Road westbound – Ellenbrook	Roundabout interchange.
Swan	Lexia–Whiteman border	28.2	17.5	Gnangara Road (State Route 84) – Wangara, Ellenbrook, Swan Valley	Six-ramp parclo interchange. Tonkin-north to Gnangara-east and Tonkin-south to Gnangara-west ramps looped.
Swan	Ballajura–Cullacabardee–Whiteman tripoint	33.8	21.0	Hepburn Avenue westbound (State Route 82) / Beechboro Road North southeast bound (State Route 53) – Hillarys, Greenwood, Beechboro, Whiteman Park	Roundabout interchange
Swan–Bayswater border	Malaga–Noranda–Bennett Springs–Beechboro quadripoint	35.5– 37.1	22.1– 23.1	Reid Highway (State Route 3) – Joondalup, Midland	Modified combination interchange; additional ramp providing westbound access from Lightning Park to Reid Highway
Bayswater	Noranda–Morley border	37.6	23.4	Benara Road – Caversham, Midland	Formerly traffic light controlled intersection; currently flyover
Bayswater	Morley	39.1	24.3	Morley Drive westbound (State Route 76) / Morley Drive East (State Route 76) – Morley, Trigg, Eden Hill	Roundabout interchange
Bayswater	Bayswater	41.2	25.6	Collier Road – Bassendean, Morley	Single-point urban interchange
Bayswater	Bayswater	42.8– 43.4	26.6– 27.0	Guildford Road (State Route 51) – Perth, Midland	Folded diamond interchange
Swan River		44.1– 44.4	27.4– 27.6	Mooro-Beeloo Bridge	
Belmont	Ascot–Redcliffe border	44.4– 45.0	27.6– 28.0	Great Eastern Highway (National Highway 94 / National Route 1) – Perth, Midland, Perth Airport terminals T3/T4	Six-ramp parclo interchange, looped entry ramps for GE-west to Tonkin-north and GE-east to Tonkin-south; provides access to and from Perth Airport's Terminal 3 and 4 via Fauntleroy Avenue
Belmont	Perth Airport–Cloverdale border	46.4	28.8	Dunreath Drive – Perth Airport terminals T3/T4	Partial dogbone interchange with roundabout and traffic lights on western side, main access to and from Perth Airport's Terminal 3 and 4
Belmont	Perth Airport–Cloverdale–Kewdale tripoint	48.0– 47.7	29.8– 29.6	Leach Highway (State Route 7) southwest bound / Airport Drive northeast bound – Fremantle, Welshpool, Perth Airport terminals T1/T2	Grand Gateway interchange; modified combination interchange; northbound-to-westbound controlled by traffic lights at the Leach Highway/Abernethy Road interchange
Belmont	Perth Airport–Kewdale border	50.4	31.3	Kewdale Road southwest bound / Horrie Miller Drive northeast bound – Kewdale, Welshpool, Perth Airport international terminal	Single-point urban interchange
Belmont–Kalamunda border	Perth Airport–Kewdale border	51.7	32.1	Abernethy Road (State Route 55) – Belmont, Hazelmere	Southbound entrance and northbound exit; exit loop ramp merges with McDowell Street
Kalamunda	Kewdale–Forrestfield–Wattle Grove tripoint	52.3– 53.5	32.5– 33.2	Roe Highway (State Route 3) – Fremantle, Midland	Modified hybrid diamond interchange (partial freeway-to-freeway interchange): Tonkin Highway free-flowing, southbound exit to Roe Highway westbound free flowing
Kalamunda	Forrestfield–Wattle Grove border	53.9	33.5	Hale Road – Forrestfield, Wattle Grove	Traffic light intersection; will be replaced with a partial interchange with northbound entrance and southbound exit
Kalamunda	Wattle Grove	55.5	34.5	Welshpool Road East (State Route 8) – Kalamunda, Lesmurdie, Perth, Welshpool	Traffic light intersection; will be replaced with a diamond interchange
Gosnells	Maddington–Orange Grove border	58.1	36.1	Kelvin Road – Maddington, Orange Grove	Traffic light intersection; will be replaced with an interchange
Gosnells	Maddington–Orange Grove border	60.9	37.8	Gosnells Road East – Orange Grove	
Gosnells	Maddington–Orange Grove–Martin tripoint	61.1	38.0	Gosnells Road West – Gosnells, Maddington	Traffic light intersection
Gosnells	Martin	63.2	39.3	Mills Road East / Mills Road West – Martin, Roleystone	Traffic light intersection
Canning River		64.6– 64.7	40.1– 40.2	Bridge over river	
Gosnells–Armadale border	Kelmscott–Gosnells–Champion Lakes tripoint	64.7– 65.3	40.2– 40.6	Albany Highway (State Route 30) – Armadale, Kelmscott, Gosnells, Perth	Folded diamond interchange
Gosnells–Armadale border	Gosnells–Champion Lakes border	65.3– 66.3	40.6– 41.2	Corfield Street – Gosnells, Camillo	Dogbone interchange
Gosnells–Armadale border	Champion Lakes	69.2	43.0	Champion Drive – Camillo, Kelmscott, Seville Grove	Traffic light controlled T junction
Gosnells–Armadale border	Champion Lakes–Forrestdale–Southern River tripoint	71.8	44.6	Ranford Road (State Route 13) – Canning Vale, Forrestdale, Fremantle	Traffic light intersection
Armadale	Forrestdale–Haynes border	73.8	45.9	Armadale Road (State Route 14) – Armadale, Jandakot, Cockburn Central	Traffic light intersection
Armadale	Forrestdale–Haynes–Hilbert tripoint	75.3	46.8	Forrest Road – Haynes, Armadale	Traffic light controlled T junction
Armadale–Serpentine-Jarrahdale border	Doobarda–Hilbert–Oakford tripoint	77.5	48.2	Rowley Road – Hilbert, Oakford	Traffic light intersection
Serpentine-Jarrahdale	Oakford–Darling Downs border	80.7	50.1	Thomas Road (State Route 21), – Kwinana Beach, Oakford, Byford	Current southern highway terminus: traffic light controlled T junction. To be converted to a Six-ramp parclo interchange with Tonkin-north to Thomas-east and Tonkin-south to Thomas-west ramps looped..
Serpentine-Jarrahdale	Oakford–Byford–Cardup tripoint			Orton Road – Byford, Oldbury	Roundabout
Serpentine-Jarrahdale	Cardup-Mundijong boundary			Bishop Road – Cardup, Mundijong	Folded diamond interchange
Serpentine-Jarrahdale	Mundijong–Mardella boundary			Mundijong Road (State Route 22) – Rockingham, Baldivis, Mundijong, Mandurah via Kwinana Freeway (State Route 2)	Roundabout
Serpentine-Jarrahdale	Mundijong–Jarrahdale–Mardella tripoint			South Western Highway (State Route 20) – Byford, Jarrahdale, Pinjarra, Bunbury	Future southern terminus at roundabout
Closed/former; Incomplete access; Unopened

== See also ==
- Highways in Australia
- List of highways in Western Australia
- List of major roads in Perth, Western Australia
