= Doobarda, Western Australia =

Doobarda
- Suburb
- Interactive map of Doobarda
- Coordinates: 32.17°S 115.95°E
- Country: Australia
- State: Western Australia
- City: Perth
- LGA: City of Armadale
- Location: 25 km (16 mi) SSE of Perth; 7 km (4.3 mi) SW of Armadale
- Established: 2023

Government
  - State electorate: Oakford
  - Federal division: Burt

Area
  - Total: 3.4 km^{2} (1.3 sq mi)
- Postcode: 6112
Suburbs around Doobarda
Forrestdale	Forrestdale	Hilbert
Forrestdale	Doobarda	Hilbert
Oakford	Oakford	Hilbert

Doobarda is a rural south-eastern suburb and locality of Perth, Western Australia, located in the local government area of the City of Armadale, adjacent to the Tonkin Highway.

The suburb was created in 2023 by splitting the south-eastern corner of the suburb of Forrestdale as a new, separate industrial area. Two proposed options for the suburb name existed, Salmeri, after Steve Salmeri, an organiser of the local progress association and sports club, and Doobarda, a Noongar name for the Banksia flower. The name South Forrestdale was also proposed for the new suburb at one point but did not meet Landgate naming requirements and therefore could not be used.
