= Lesley, Western Australia =

Lesley
- Suburb
- Coordinates: 32.15°S 116.19°E
- Country: Australia
- State: Western Australia
- City: Perth
- LGA(s): City of Armadale
- Location: 38 km (24 mi) SE of Perth; 17 km (11 mi) E of Armadale
- Established: 2006

Government
  - State electorate(s): Darling Range
  - Federal division(s): Canning

Area
  - Total: 116.3 km^{2} (44.9 sq mi)

Population
  - Total(s): 0 (SAL 2016)
- Postcode: 6111
Suburbs around Lesley
Karragullen	Pickering Brook	Flynn
Ashendon	Lesley	Flint
Ashendon	Ashendon	Flint

Lesley is a semi-rural south-eastern suburb and locality of Perth, Western Australia, located in the local government area of the City of Armadale.

The origins of the suburb's name are uncertain; however, it is believed to be named after a Conservator of Forests daughter. The name of the suburb was approved on 3 January 2006.
