= Electoral results for the Division of Burt =

Australian division election results

This is a list of electoral results for the Division of Burt in Australian federal elections from the division's creation in 2016

== Members ==
Member	Party	Term
Matt Keogh	Labor	2016–present

== Election results ==
=== Elections in the 2020s ===
==== 2025 ====
2025 Australian federal election: Burt
Party	Candidate	Votes	%	±%
One Nation	Liz Ierardi			
Liberal	Sean Ayres			
Greens	Adam Abdul Razak			
Labor	Matt Keogh			
Legalise Cannabis	Fiona Caruso			
Christians	Alvin Mathew Vadakkedathu			
Independent	Ashok Kumar Tewatia			
Total formal votes				
Informal votes				
Turnout				

==== 2022 ====
2022 Australian federal election: Burt
Party	Candidate	Votes	%	±%
Labor	Matt Keogh	47,268	51.63	+10.51
Liberal	David Goode	21,009	22.95	−9.49
Greens	Daniel Garlett	9,004	9.84	+0.27
One Nation	Travis Carter	4,436	4.85	−1.25
Christians	Warnar Spyker	3,428	3.74	+0.06
Western Australia	Stephen Phelan	2,390	2.61	+1.40
United Australia	Joshua Mccurry	2,274	2.48	+0.24
Federation	Michele Castle	1,741	1.90	+1.90
Total formal votes		91,550	94.16	+0.82
Informal votes		5,675	5.84	−0.82
Turnout		97,225	86.10	−0.89
Two-party-preferred result
Labor	Matt Keogh	59,704	65.21	+9.71
Liberal	David Goode	31,846	34.79	−9.71
Labor hold		Swing	+9.71	

Alluvial diagram for preference flows in the seat of Burt in the 2022 federal election. The winning candidate got over 50% of first preference votes, so this alluvial diagram is indicative only, and preference flows were not used to determine the final result. The preference flows were used to determine the two-candidate-preferred.

=== Elections in the 2010s ===
==== 2019 ====
2019 Australian federal election: Burt
Party	Candidate	Votes	%	±%
Labor	Matt Keogh	36,058	40.96	−6.07
Liberal	David Goode	29,420	33.42	−1.95
Greens	Simone Collins	8,285	9.41	+1.38
One Nation	Nicole Devincentis	5,116	5.81	+5.81
Christians	Warnar Spyker	3,298	3.75	−1.40
Shooters, Fishers, Farmers	Peter Raffaelli	1,942	2.21	−2.22
United Australia	Sahil Chawla	1,871	2.13	+2.13
Independent	Naomi Nation	1,149	1.31	+1.31
Western Australia	Sarcha Sagisaka	901	1.02	+1.02
Total formal votes		88,040	93.58	−2.00
Informal votes		6,042	6.42	+2.00
Turnout		94,082	89.42	+0.69
Two-party-preferred result
Labor	Matt Keogh	48,414	54.99	−2.12
Liberal	David Goode	39,626	45.01	+2.12
Labor hold		Swing	−2.12	

==== 2016 ====
2016 Australian federal election: Burt
Party	Candidate	Votes	%	±%
Labor	Matt Keogh	39,673	47.03	+15.11
Liberal	Matt O'Sullivan	29,836	35.37	−10.23
Greens	Muhammad Salman	6,770	8.03	+0.28
Christians	Warnar Spyker	4,345	5.15	+1.60
Shooters, Fishers, Farmers	Ian Blevin	3,734	4.43	+4.43
Total formal votes		84,358	95.58	+1.30
Informal votes		3,903	4.42	−1.30
Turnout		88,261	88.73	+1.37
Two-party-preferred result
Labor	Matt Keogh	48,177	57.11	+13.20
Liberal	Matt O'Sullivan	36,181	42.89	−13.20
Labor notional gain from Liberal		Swing	+13.20	

Burt was a new seat, notionally held by the Liberal party.
