= Oakford, Western Australia =

Oakford
- Suburb
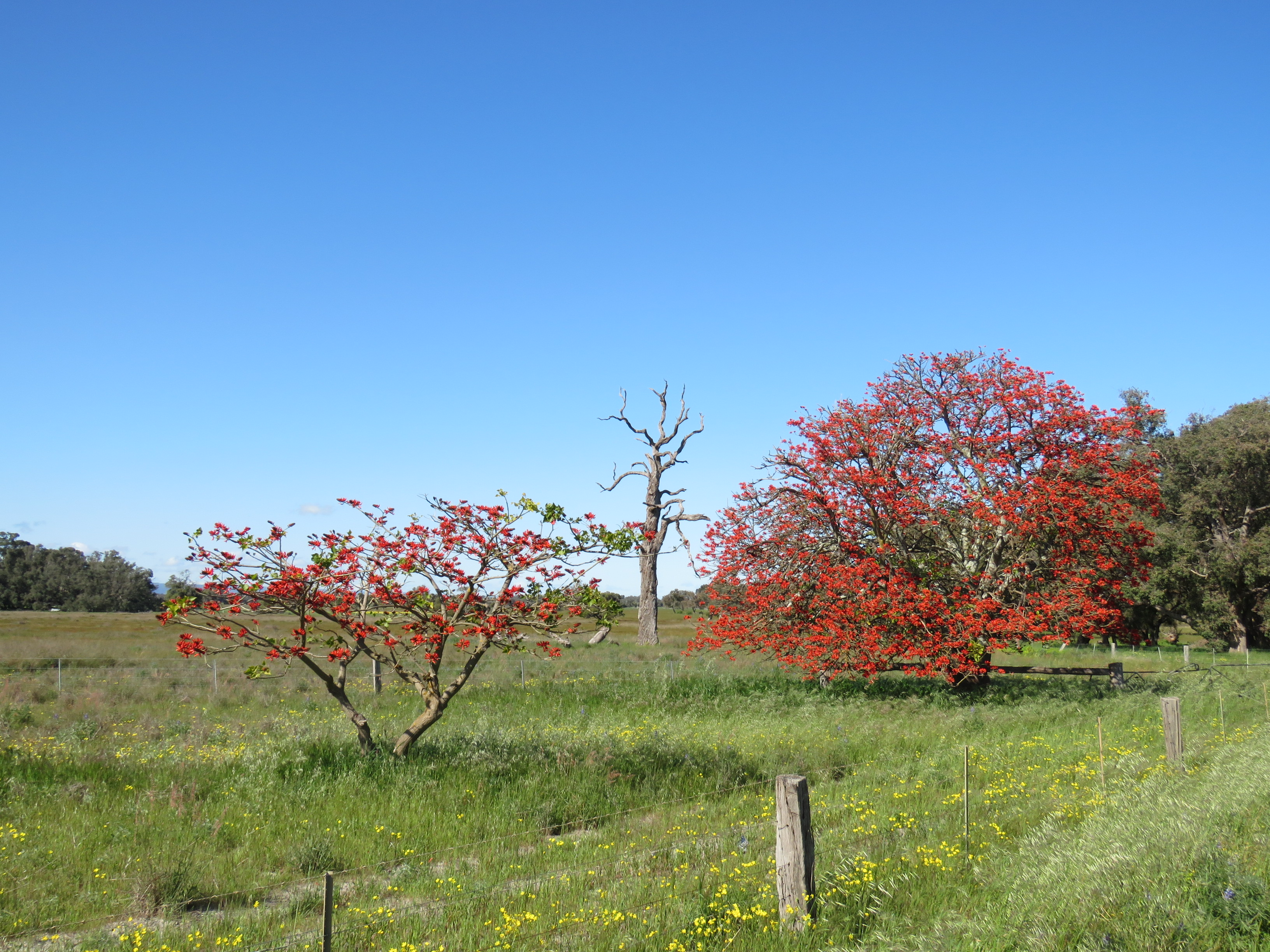
- Trees and fields in predominantly rural Oakford
- Interactive map of Oakford
- Coordinates: 32.212°S 115.931°E
- Country: Australia
- State: Western Australia
- City: Perth
- LGA: Shire of Serpentine-Jarrahdale
- Location: 36 km (22 mi) S of Perth

Government
  - State electorate: Oakford
  - Federal division: Canning

Area
  - Total: 46.9 km^{2} (18.1 sq mi)

Population
  - Total: 2,803 (SAL 2021)
- Postcode: 6121
Suburbs around Oakford
Banjup	Forrestdale Doobarda	Hilbert
Wandi	Oakford	Darling Downs
Anketell	Oldbury	Byford

Oakford is an outer suburb of Perth, Western Australia, within the Shire of Serpentine-Jarrahdale. The suburb was named in 1982, taking its name from a townsite briefly declared in the area in 1926.

== Infrastructure and economy ==
=== Agriculture ===
Borrello Cheese, established over 40 years ago, operates in Oakford and produces cheeses in Italian styles which are exported to stores and restaurants around Perth.

=== Education ===
An application for a new school located in Oakford was submitted by the Free Reformed Church School Association in 2023. The association already operates the John Calvin School in Byford. The proposed school would teach students from kindergarten to Year 12, with a capacity of 1,200 students. The application proposed that it would be built in two stages, with the senior block starting construction in 2028, and the junior block from 2032. The proposal received objections from local residents due to the issues it would cause to traffic and that it would 'ruin the vibe' of the rural area. The council also unaimously voted to recommend the project's refusal to Metro Outer Joint Development Assessment Panel.

=== Fire ===
In Oakford operates the Oakford Volunteer Bush Fire Brigade. Plans for a fire station in Oakford began in 2020, with the Shire finalising concept plans in October 2023.

== Transportation ==
Within Oakford are Thomas Road, Nicholson Road and Tonkin Highway; with both the south ends of Nicholson Road and Tonkin Highway ending at intersections with Thomas Road in Oakford.

Since 2023, sections of Kargotich Road have been closed due to construction of new roundabouts on Thomas road intersection with Kargotich and Nicholson Roads. Road works are expected to mid-2024. This is in order to improve traffic flow along the Kwinana and South Western highways. Tonkin Highway is also being extended through Oakford to Jarrahdale.

Below are the three major roads and their directions:

- Tonkin Highway (State Route 4) - north to Muchea and Perth Airport; south terminus at Thomas Road in Oakford.
- Thomas Road (State Route 21) - west to Kwinana; east to Byford.
- Nicholson Road (State Route 31) - north to Gosnells; south terminus at Thomas Road in Oakford.

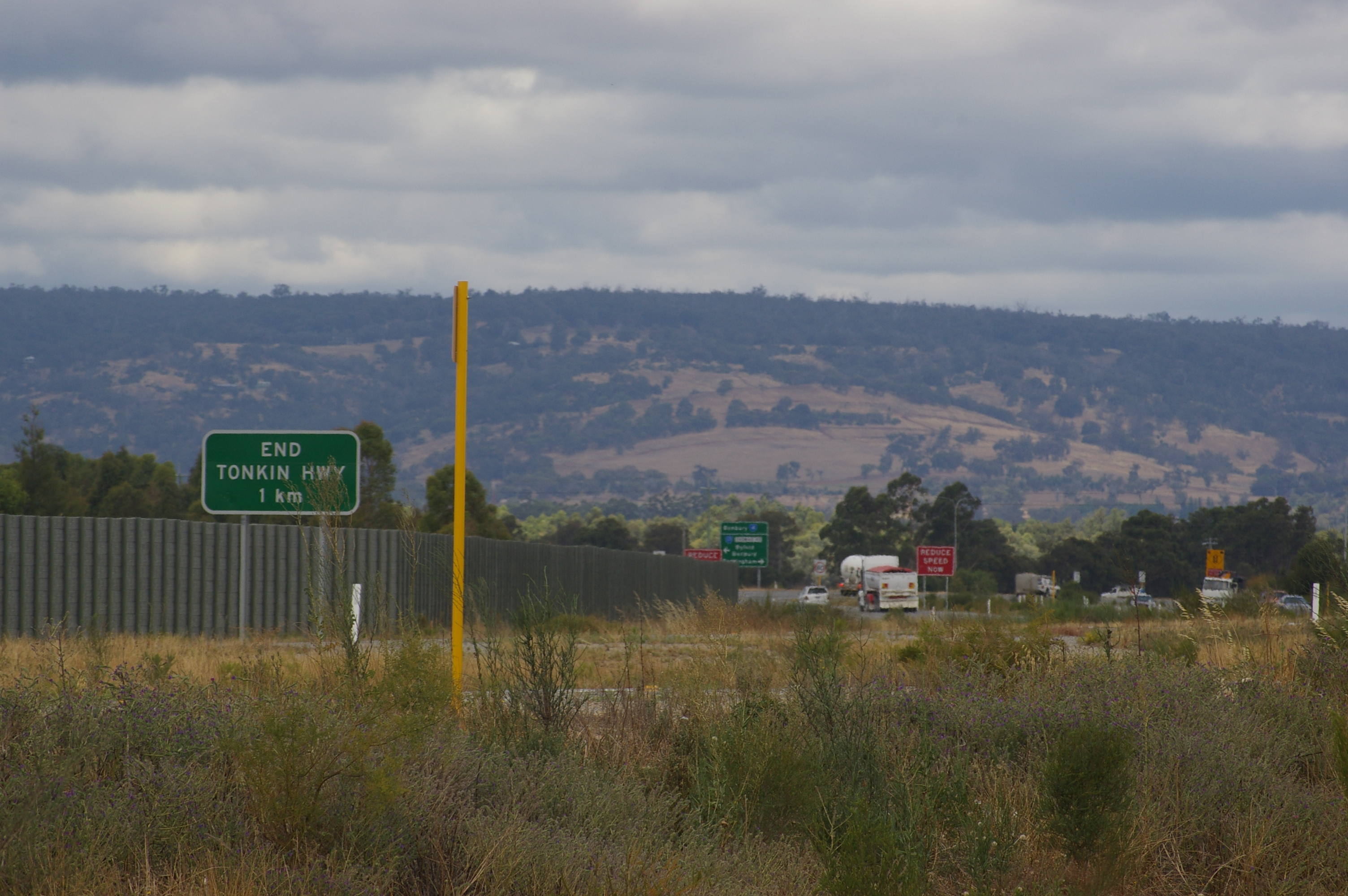
South terminus of Tonkin highway in Oakford
