= Electoral district of Oakford =

Electoral district of the Western Australian Legislative Assembly

Oakford Western Australia—Legislative Assembly
- Interactive map of district boundaries from the 2025 state election
- State: Western Australia
- Created: 2025
- MP: Yaz Mubarakai
- Party: Labor
- Namesake: Oakford
- Electors: 33,597 (2025)
- Area: 143 km^{2} (55.2 sq mi)
- Demographic: Outer metropolitan
- Coordinates: 32.16°S 115.92°E
Electorates around Oakford:
Jandakot	Southern River	Armadale
Cockburn	Oakford	Darling Range
Kwinana	Darling Range	Darling Range

Oakford is an electoral district of the Western Australian Legislative Assembly. The seat was created at the 2023 redistribution.

Oakford was first contested at the 2025 state election and was notionally held by the Labor Party on a 27.7% margin. Yaz Mubarakai was elected as Oakford's first MP following a switch of electorates from Jandakot. Mubarakai would be succeeded by Stephen Pratt in Jandakot.

== Geography ==
Oakford was created in response to significant population growth in the corridor between the outer southern Perth cities of Cockburn and Armadale. The district was named for the semi-rural locality of Oakford which takes up around one-third of the area.

As of 2025 Oakford is composed of

- City of Armadale: Brookdale, Doobarda, Forrestdale, Haynes, Hilbert, Piara Waters, part of Harrisdale
- City of Cockburn: Aubin Grove, part of Banjup
- City of Kwinana: Anketell, Casuarina, Wandi
- Shire of Serpentine-Jarrahdale: Oakford, part of Darling Downs

== Members for Oakford ==
Member	Party	Term
Yaz Mubarakai	Labor	2025–present

== Election results ==
2025 Western Australian state election: Oakford
Party	Candidate	Votes	%	±%
Labor	Yaz Mubarakai	12,794	45.5	−24.8
Liberal	Tait Marston	6,715	23.9	+7.0
Greens	Heather Lonsdale	2,792	9.9	+5.5
Christians	Jiby Joy	1,973	7.0	+4.1
One Nation	Mandy Dhandli	1,825	6.5	+4.5
Legalise Cannabis	Srdjan Lazarevic	877	3.1	+3.1
Shooters, Fishers, Farmers	Ronald Lean	587	2.1	+2.1
Independent	Lawrence Levett	528	1.9	+1.9
Total formal votes		28,091	95.2	−1.1
Informal votes		1,407	4.8	+1.1
Turnout		29,498	87.8	+6.5
Two-party-preferred result
Labor	Yaz Mubarakai	17,381	61.9	−15.8
Liberal	Tait Marston	10,696	38.1	+15.8
Labor hold		Swing	−15.8	
