= Hilbert, Western Australia =

Hilbert
- Suburb
- Interactive map of Hilbert
- Coordinates: 32.172°S 115.980°E
- Country: Australia
- State: Western Australia
- City: Perth
- LGA: City of Armadale
- Location: 31 km (19 mi) SSE of Perth; 4 km (2.5 mi) SW of Armadale
- Established: 2008

Government
  - State electorate: Oakford
  - Federal divisions: Burt; Canning

Area
  - Total: 8.6 km^{2} (3.3 sq mi)

Population
  - Total: 4,165 (SAL 2021)
- Postcode: 6112
Suburbs around Hilbert
Forrestdale	Haynes	Brookdale
Doobarda	Hilbert	Wungong
Oakford	Darling Downs	Darling Downs

Hilbert is a suburb of Perth, Western Australia, located within the City of Armadale. This rural and semi-rural suburb is located on the city's fringe, and in the 2010s began to be subdivided for urban purposes.

The name was derived from the Hilbert family who were dairy farmers within the area. A road was proposed through Wilhelm Hermann (known as Herman or Harry) Hilbert's property in 1899, and in 1966 the unconstructed road reserve was named "Hilbert Road". There is also a large wetland in the locality generally referred to as the Hilbert Road Swamp.

The locality was formed from the suburb of Brookdale on 1 April 2008, and on 4 October 2011 the suburb's western boundary was amended to coincide with the centreline of Tonkin Highway.

Hilbert is home to the popular Shipwreck Park, a $4.8million park that spans 6 hectares and features a 30-metre shipwreck-themed playground. The playground was designed in collaboration with the Touched By Olivia Foundation, the City of Armadale, local schools and community groups to ensure children of all abilities can play together, including those with physical disabilities, vision, hearing and mobility impairments, or spectrum disorders such as autism.

In May 2023, a Retail Centre Development Application was lodged to bring a town centre to Hilbert, on Weatherly Way within Stockland's Sienna Wood community. In July 2023 Stage 1 Civil Works were completed.

Wungong Primary School opened in 2026, serving Hilbert and surrounding suburbs.

== Transport ==
=== Bus ===
- 246 Hilbert to Armadale Station – serves Lexington Avenue, Brighstone Avenue, Eleventh Road and Forrest Road
- 249 Hilbert to Armadale Station – serves Lexington Avenue, Rowley Road, Eleventh Road and Wungong Road
- 250 Armadale Station to Armadale Station – Circular Route, serves Powell Crescent and Ninth Road
