= City of Armadale =

Coordinates: 32°9′11″S 116°0′54″E

- Local government area
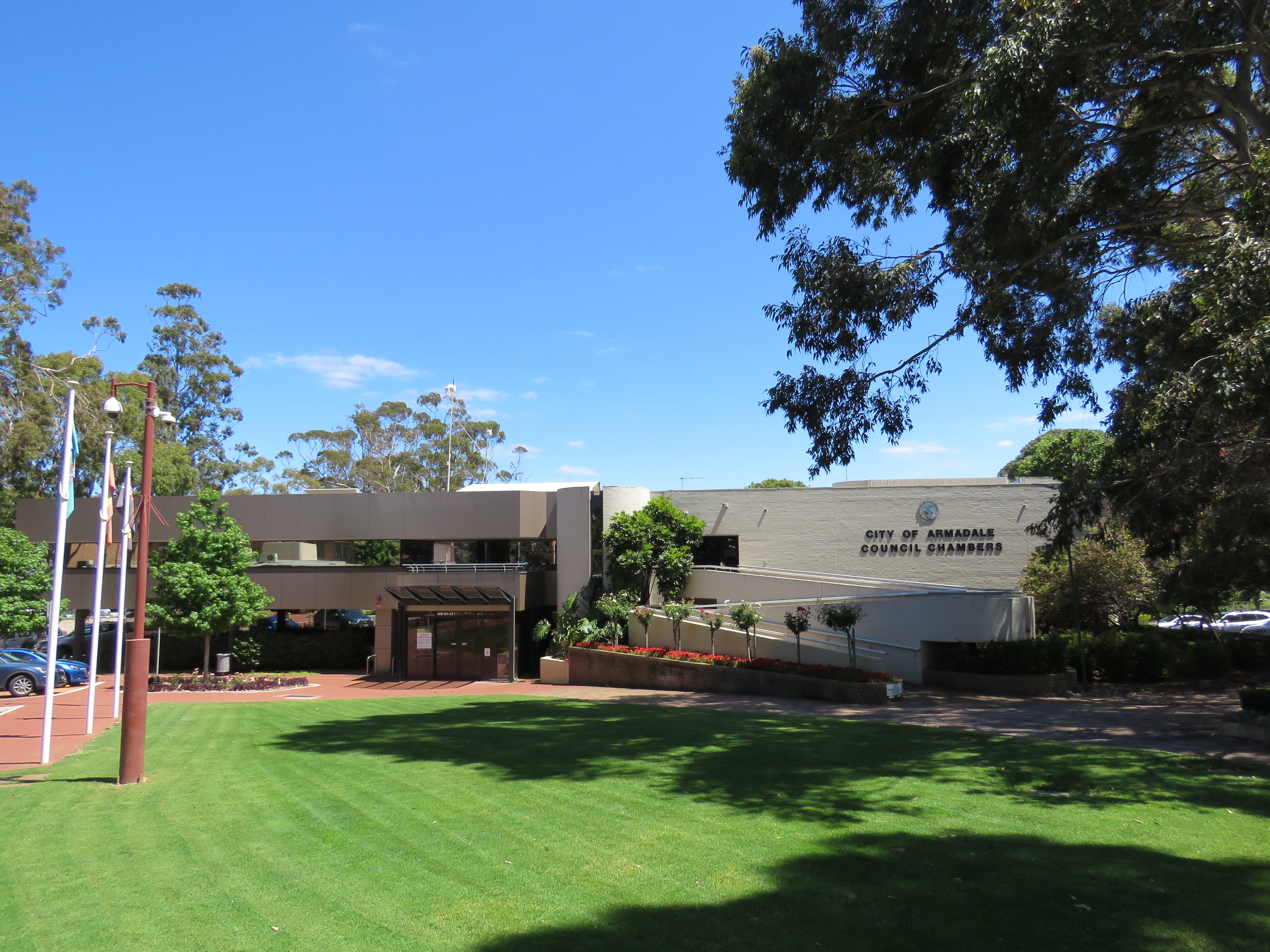
- The City of Armadale council chambers

- Interactive map of City of Armadale
- Country: Australia
- State: Western Australia
- Region: South East Metropolitan Perth; Darling Scarp
- Established: 1894
- Council seat: Armadale

Government
  - Mayor: Ruth Butterfield
  - State electorate: Armadale, Darling Range, Southern River, Oakford
  - Federal division: Burt, Canning

Area
  - Total: 559.5 km^{2} (216.0 sq mi)

Population
  - Total: 94,184 (LGA 2021)
- Website: City of Armadale
LGAs around City of Armadale
Gosnells	Kalamunda	York
Cockburn	City of Armadale	Beverley
Kwinana	Serpentine–Jarrahdale	Wandering

The City of Armadale is a local government area in the southeastern suburbs of the Western Australian capital city of Perth, about 28 kilometres (17.4 mi) southeast of Perth's central business district. The City covers an area of 560 square kilometres (216 sq mi), much of which is state forest rising into the Darling Scarp to the east, and had a population of almost 80,000 as at the 2016 Census. At the 2021 census, the population had risen to 94,184.

== History ==
Prior to European settlement, the area now known as the City of Armadale was part of the land that was occupied by the Aboriginal Noongar people.

Prior to 1894, the area was part of the Canning Road District.

The City of Armadale originated as the Kelmscott Road District, which was created on 14 December 1894 out of parts of Fremantle and Jandakot Road Districts. On 24 March 1910, it was renamed the Armadale-Kelmscott Road District.

On 1 July 1961, it became the Shire of Armadale–Kelmscott following the enactment of the Local Government Act 1960. On 1 July 1977, its Byford Ward was abolished and transferred to the Shire of Serpentine–Jarrahdale.

On 1 July 1979 it became the Town of Armadale and on 16 November 1985 it assumed its current name when attained city status.

The City of Armadale maintains 615 km of roads and a little over 14 km² of parks and gardens.

== Wards ==
The city has been divided into seven wards, each with two councillors. The mayor is elected from among the councillors.

- Heron Ward
- Lake Ward
- Hills Ward
- Minnawarra Ward
- Ranford Ward
- Palomino Ward
- River Ward

== Suburbs ==
The suburbs of the City of Armadale with population and size figures based on the most recent Australian census:

Suburb	Population	Area	Map
Armadale	13,415 (SAL 2021)	8.3 km^{2} (3.2 sq mi)	
Ashendon	3 (SAL 2021)	210.1 km^{2} (81.1 sq mi)	
Bedfordale	3,038 (SAL 2021)	57.6 km^{2} (22.2 sq mi)	
Brookdale	2,968 (SAL 2021)	1.2 km^{2} (0.46 sq mi)	
Camillo	4,442 (SAL 2021)	2.6 km^{2} (1.0 sq mi)	
Champion Lakes	1,355 (SAL 2021)	5.6 km^{2} (2.2 sq mi)	
Doobarda	^{[1]}	3.4 km^{2} (1.3 sq mi)	
Forrestdale	1,027 (SAL 2021)	28.4 km^{2} (11.0 sq mi)	
Harrisdale	11,667 (SAL 2021)	5.8 km^{2} (2.2 sq mi)	
Haynes	2,417 (SAL 2021)	13.0 km^{2} (5.0 sq mi)	
Hilbert	4,165 (SAL 2021)	0.7 km^{2} (0.27 sq mi)	
Karragullen	395 (SAL 2021)	29.9 km^{2} (11.5 sq mi)	
Kelmscott	10,575 (SAL 2021)	15.0 km^{2} (5.8 sq mi)	
Lesley	0 (SAL 2016)	116.3 km^{2} (44.9 sq mi)	
Mount Nasura	2,997 (SAL 2021)	2.7 km^{2} (1.0 sq mi)	
Mount Richon	2,067 (SAL 2021)	2.2 km^{2} (0.85 sq mi)	
Piara Waters	15,029 (SAL 2021)	6.7 km^{2} (2.6 sq mi)	
Roleystone	6,848 (SAL 2021)	44.9 km^{2} (17.3 sq mi)	
Seville Grove	11,408 (SAL 2021)	4.5 km^{2} (1.7 sq mi)	
Wungong	370 (SAL 2021)	4.2 km^{2} (1.6 sq mi)	

- ^[1] The suburb of Doobarda was created after the 2021 Australian census.

== Population ==
Historical population

Year	Pop.	±% p.a.
1911	1,327	—
1921	2,251	+5.43%
1933	3,585	+3.95%
1947	4,253	+1.23%
1954	5,753	+4.41%
1961	6,469	+1.69%
1966	7,840	+3.92%
1971	15,644	+14.82%
1976	25,823	+10.54%

Year	Pop.	±% p.a.
1981	36,116	+6.94%
1986	41,248	+2.69%
1991	46,716	+2.52%
1996	49,507	+1.17%
2001	49,893	+0.16%
2006	50,535	+0.26%
2011	62,296	+4.27%
2016	79,602	+5.03%
2021	94,184	+3.42%

- Note: The 1976 figure above, reported from the 1978 year book and 1981 census, is the figure after the removal of 1,634 residents living in Byford and nearby areas, which occurred in 1977.

== Heritage-listed places ==
As of 2024, 162 places are heritage-listed in the City of Armadale, of which 13 are on the State Register of Heritage Places, among them Araluen Botanic Park, the Canning Contour Channel and the Old Jarrah Tree.
