= Forrestdale, Western Australia =

Forrestdale
- Suburb
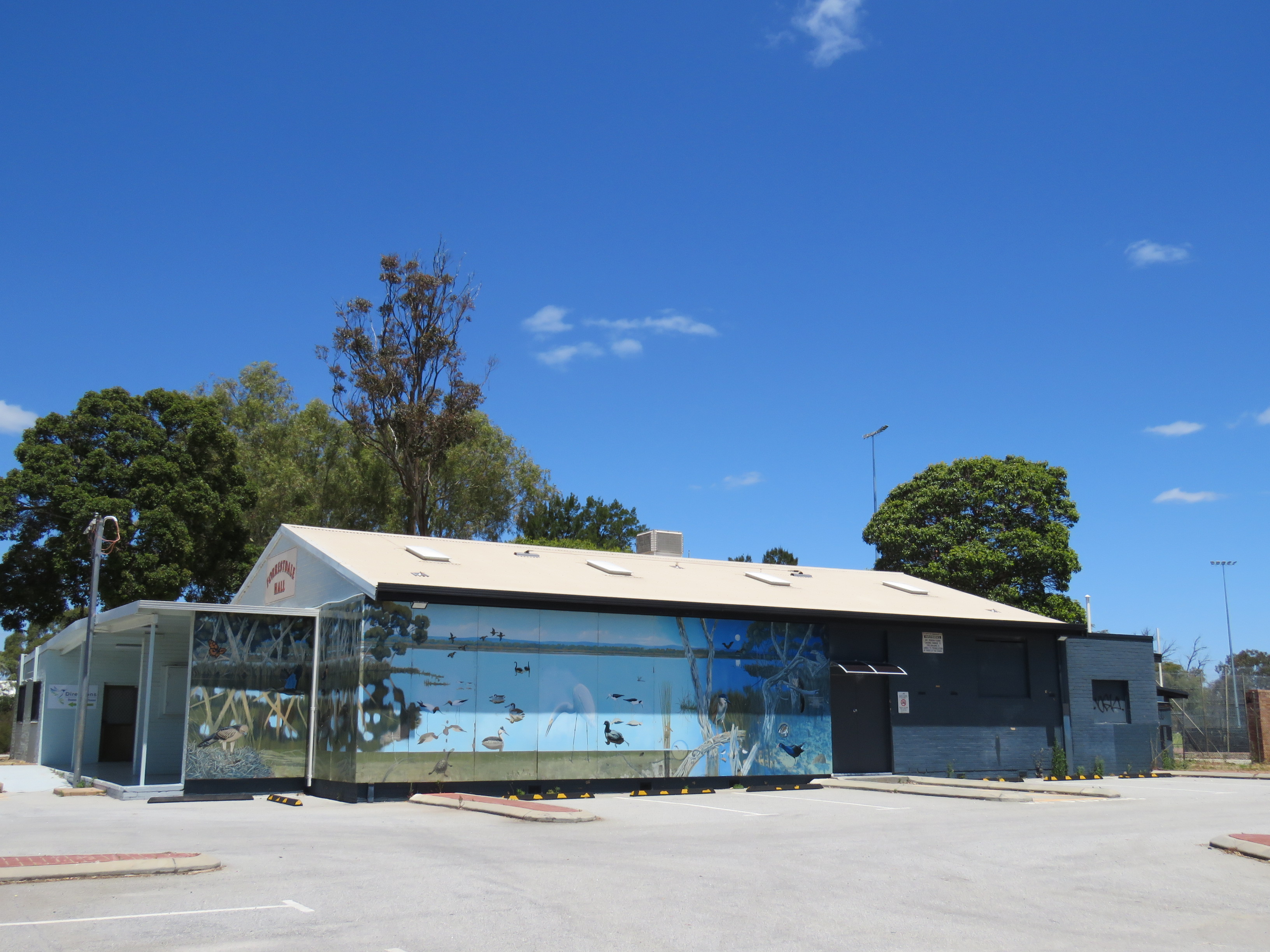
- Forrestdale Hall
- Interactive map of Forrestdale
- Coordinates: 32.148°S 115.941°E
- Country: Australia
- State: Western Australia
- City: Perth
- LGA: City of Armadale
- Location: 31 km (19 mi) SSE of Perth; 8 km (5.0 mi) W of Armadale

Government
  - State electorate: Oakford
  - Federal division: Burt

Area
  - Total: 28.4 km^{2} (11.0 sq mi)

Population
  - Total: 1,027 (SAL 2021)
- Postcode: 6112
Suburbs around Forrestdale
| Piara Waters, Harrisdale | Southern River | Champion Lakes, Seville Grove |
| Banjup | Forrestdale | Haynes |
| Wandi | Doobarda, Oakford | Hilbert |

Forrestdale is a suburb of Perth, Western Australia, located within the City of Armadale. It is named after John Forrest, the first premier of Western Australia.

== Geography ==
Forrestdale is home to Forrestdale Lake, a nature reserve important for waterbirds, many of which breed there. It usually fills in winter and dries out in summer. The nature reserve contains the only known remaining habitat of Neopasiphae simplicior, a critically endangered native bee. Tiger snakes are commonly seen at this nature reserve, along with dugites.

== Amenities and facilities ==
Forrestdale has a golf course. There is a recently built private school, a campus of Carey Baptist College, which also has another campus in Harrisdale, offering education from kindergarten and daycare to Year 9. In 2024, the campus expanded to include Year 12 students into its school cohort. The first class of Year 12 students graduated that same year.

== Transport ==
=== Bus ===
Bus routes serving Armadale Road:

- 233 Cockburn Central Station to Gosnells Station
- 518 Cockburn Central Station to Murdoch TAFE
- 519 Murdoch TAFE to Armadale Station
- 529 Cockburn Central Station to Armadale Station
