= Mount Nasura, Western Australia =

Mount Nasura
- Suburb
- Interactive map of Mount Nasura
- Coordinates: 32.138°S 116.026°E
- Country: Australia
- State: Western Australia
- City: Perth
- LGA: City of Armadale
- Location: 26 km (16 mi) from Perth; 2 km (1.2 mi) from Armadale

Government
  - State electorate: Armadale
  - Federal division: Bullwinkel

Area
  - Total: 2.8 km^{2} (1.1 sq mi)

Population
  - Total: 2,997 (SAL 2021)
- Postcode: 6112
Suburbs around Mount Nasura
	Kelmscott
Armadale	Mount Nasura	Bedfordale
Armadale	Mount Richon	Bedfordale

Mount Nasura is a suburb of Perth, Western Australia, located within the City of Armadale. The suburb occupies hilly terrain bounded on the north by Brookton Highway and Hill Street (1.6 km), west by Paterson Road (1.1 km), south-west by Canns and Carradine Roads (1.6 km), south by property boundaries on the north side of the Neerigin Brook (0.3 km), and east by Albany Highway (2.7m). With the exception of the Armadale Health Service, the suburb is primarily residential.

== History ==
The suburb takes its name from a vineyard named "Derry na Sura" – Gaelic for "Valley of the Vine", which formerly occupied the hillside above Albany Highway just north of the Narrogin Inn. This vineyard was established in the early 1890s by a partnership of Martin E. Jull, then Chief Clerk of the Railway Construction Department, and Dr J . M. Fergusson-Stewart. In 1896, Fergusson-Stewart's share was bought out by Sir Arthur Stepney, an English baronet, and for a time the vineyard was known as the Stepney Jull Armadale Vineyard. Jull sold out to Stepney in 1899. Under Stepney's ownership, the vineyard was significantly expanded and renamed the Derry NaSura Vineyard. Stepney also developed an extensive orchard alongside the vineyard, and in 1904 erected a substantial cellar building, which was a landmark on the hillside above the infant township. In the early years of the 20th century, the vineyard was one of Armadale's leading industries along with the Armadale Brickworks.

When Stepney died in 1909, the vineyard was taken over by Messrs H. C. Sewell and C. Crocker, who continued to invest in the development of this enterprise. In 1946 the vineyard was purchased by Messrs G. Hack and W. Clowes, and at that time comprised 268 acres, of which 100 acres were planted with vines.

Vines were removed in the 1950s and some time later the redundant cellars were demolished. The property was purchased by a private syndicate and in 1966 it was rezoned for residential subdivision. In the decades that followed the distinctively terraced hillside was gradually covered by suburban housing.

During the 1980s and 1990s, residents successfully campaigned to have the name of the area changed from Armadale to Mount Nasura.

== Transport ==
=== Bus ===
- 219 Armadale Station to Kelmscott Station – serves Albany Highway and Armadale Health Service
- 220 Armadale Station to Perth Busport – serves Albany Highway
- 241 Kelmscott Station to Kelmscott Station – serves Brookton Highway
