= Brookdale, Western Australia =

Brookdale
- Suburb
- Interactive map of Brookdale
- Coordinates: 32.168°S 116.003°E
- Country: Australia
- State: Western Australia
- City: Perth
- LGA: City of Armadale
- Location: 30 km (19 mi) SSE of Perth; 2 km (1.2 mi) SW of Armadale
- Established: 1997

Government
  - State electorate: Oakford
  - Federal division: Burt

Area
  - Total: 10.0 km^{2} (3.9 sq mi)

Population
  - Total: 2,968 (SAL 2021)
- Postcode: 6112
Suburbs around Brookdale
Haynes	Armadale	Armadale
Hilbert	Brookdale	Mount Richon
Hilbert	Wungong	Wungong

Brookdale is a suburb of Perth, Western Australia, located within the City of Armadale. Formerly part of the district of Wungong, Brookdale was gazetted in 1997.

== Schools ==
- Gwynne Park Primary School
- Xavier Catholic School (2005)
- Australian Christian College – Darling Downs

== Transport ==
=== Bus ===
- 249 Armadale Station to Hilbert – serves Wungong Road
- 250 Armadale Station to Armadale Station – Circular Route, serves Tijuana Road, Powell Crescent, Chadwick Parade, Farmer Avenue, Ninth Road and Harber Drive
