= Division of Burt =

Australian federal electoral division

Coordinates: 32°6′30″S 115°58′8″E

Burt Australian House of Representatives Division
- Interactive map of electorate boundaries from the 2025 federal election
- Created: 2016
- MP: Matt Keogh
- Party: Labor
- Namesake: Burt family of Western Australia
- Electors: 113,024 (2022)
- Area: 172 km^{2} (66.4 sq mi)
- Demographic: Outer metropolitan
Electorates around Burt:
Swan	Bullwinkel	Bullwinkel
Tangney; Fremantle	Burt	Bullwinkel
Brand	Canning	Canning

The Division of Burt is an Australian electoral division in Perth in the state of Western Australia.

Burt contains Perth's growing southeastern suburban corridor and covers 190 square kilometres (73 sq mi). Major suburbs include Armadale, Gosnells, Thornlie, Kenwick, Huntingdale, Harrisdale, Piara Waters and Southern River.

The current and inaugural MP is Matt Keogh, a member of the Australian Labor Party. He has held the seat since its inception in 2016.

== History ==
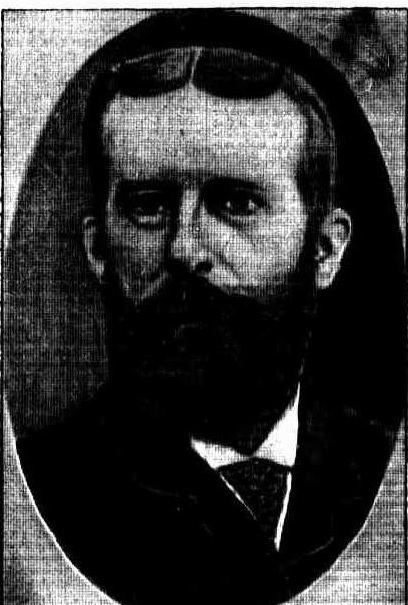
Septimus Burt, whose family is the division's namesake

The division was created in 2015 and was named after the Burt family, specifically Sir Archibald Burt, Septimus Burt and Sir Francis Burt. The division is located in the south-eastern suburbs of Perth and covers areas that had previously been represented by the divisions of Canning, Hasluck and Tangney.

The seat was first contested at the 2016 federal election. Based on the results from the 2013 federal election the division was created as a notionally fairly safe Liberal with a notional two-party preferred margin of 6.1 percent. However, based on federal polling indicating a large nine percent two-party swing to Labor since the last election, Burt was tipped as one of several seats that could have potentially fallen to Labor at the 2016 federal election. Additionally, much of the seat's territory is represented by Labor at state level.

The seat was won by Labor's Matt Keogh, who had been the Labor candidate in the 2015 Canning by-election, on a swing of over 13 percent, turning it from fairly safe Liberal to fairly safe Labor.

== Geography ==
Since 1984, federal electoral division boundaries in Australia have been determined at redistributions by a redistribution committee appointed by the Australian Electoral Commission. Redistributions occur for the boundaries of divisions in a particular state, and they occur every seven years, or sooner if a state's representation entitlement changes or when divisions of a state are malapportioned.

In August 2021, the Australian Electoral Commission announced that the suburb of Canning Vale would be transferred from Burt to the seat of Tangney, while Burt would gain the suburbs of Kenwick, Maddington, Orange Grove and part of Martin from the seat of Canning. These boundary changes took place as of the 2022 election.

The seat presently comprises considerable portions of the City of Gosnells and the City of Armadale. Suburbs presently included are:

=== City of Armadale ===
- Armadale
- Brookdale
- Camillo
- Champion Lakes
- Forrestdale
- Harrisdale
- Haynes
- Hilbert (part)
- Kelmscott
- Mount Nasura
- Piara Waters
- Seville Grove
- Wungong (part)

=== City of Gosnells ===
- Beckenham
- Gosnells
- Huntingdale
- Kenwick
- Langford
- Maddington
- Martin (part)
- Orange Grove
- Southern River
- Thornlie

== Members ==
Image	Member	Party	Term	Notes
	Matt Keogh (1981–)	Labor	2 July 2016 – present	Incumbent. Currently a minister under Albanese

== Election results ==
2025 Australian federal election: Burt
Party	Candidate	Votes	%	±%
Labor	Matt Keogh	46,123	46.73	−3.03
Liberal	Sean Ayres	18,879	19.13	−5.67
Greens	Adam Abdul Razak	11,336	11.49	+1.96
One Nation	Liz Ierardi	9,789	9.92	+5.07
Legalise Cannabis	Fiona Caruso	5,784	5.86	+5.86
Christians	Alvin Mathew Vadakkedathu	4,630	4.69	+0.89
Independent	Ashok Kumar Tewatia	2,150	2.18	+2.18
Total formal votes		98,691	95.52	+1.42
Informal votes		4,634	4.48	−1.42
Turnout		103,325	86.11	+4.63
Two-party-preferred result
Labor	Matt Keogh	64,845	65.71	+2.42
Liberal	Sean Ayres	33,846	34.29	−2.42
Labor hold		Swing	+2.42	
