= Haynes, Western Australia =

Haynes
- Suburb
- Interactive map of Haynes
- Coordinates: 32.154°S 115.974°E
- Country: Australia
- State: Western Australia
- City: Perth
- LGA: City of Armadale
- Location: 31 km (19 mi) SSE of Perth; 5 km (3.1 mi) W of Armadale
- Established: 2008

Government
  - State electorate: Oakford
  - Federal division: Burt

Area
  - Total: 4.8 km^{2} (1.9 sq mi)

Population
  - Total: 2,417 (SAL 2021)
- Postcode: 6112
Suburbs around Haynes
Forrestdale	Forrestdale	Seville Grove
Forrestdale	Haynes	Armadale
Hilbert	Hilbert	Hilbert

Haynes is a suburb of Perth, Western Australia, located within the City of Armadale. This rural and semi-rural suburb is located on the city's fringe, and in the 2010s began to be subdivided for urban purposes.

The suburb was named after Walter Alexander Birrell Haynes and his wife Margaret, who moved to the district sometime before 1910 and operated a dairy farm in the area for many years. Members of the Haynes family have made a significant contribution to local community organisations such as sporting clubs for many years, and helped establish many other groups. Walter Haynes was the Chairman of the Armadale-Kelmscott Road Board between 1938 and 1946.

The locality was formed from Brookdale on 1 April 2008.

The Haynes Shopping Centre is named for the suburb but is located in the adjacent locality of Armadale.

The closest train station is Armadale for public transport.

== Transport ==
=== Bus ===
- 244 Armadale Station to Kelmscott Station – serves Eighth Road
- 246 Armadale Station to Hilbert – serves Forrest Road
- 519 Armadale Station to Murdoch TAFE – serves Armadale Road
- 529 Armadale Station to Cockburn Central Station – serves Armadale Road
