= Armadale, Western Australia =

Armadale
- Suburb
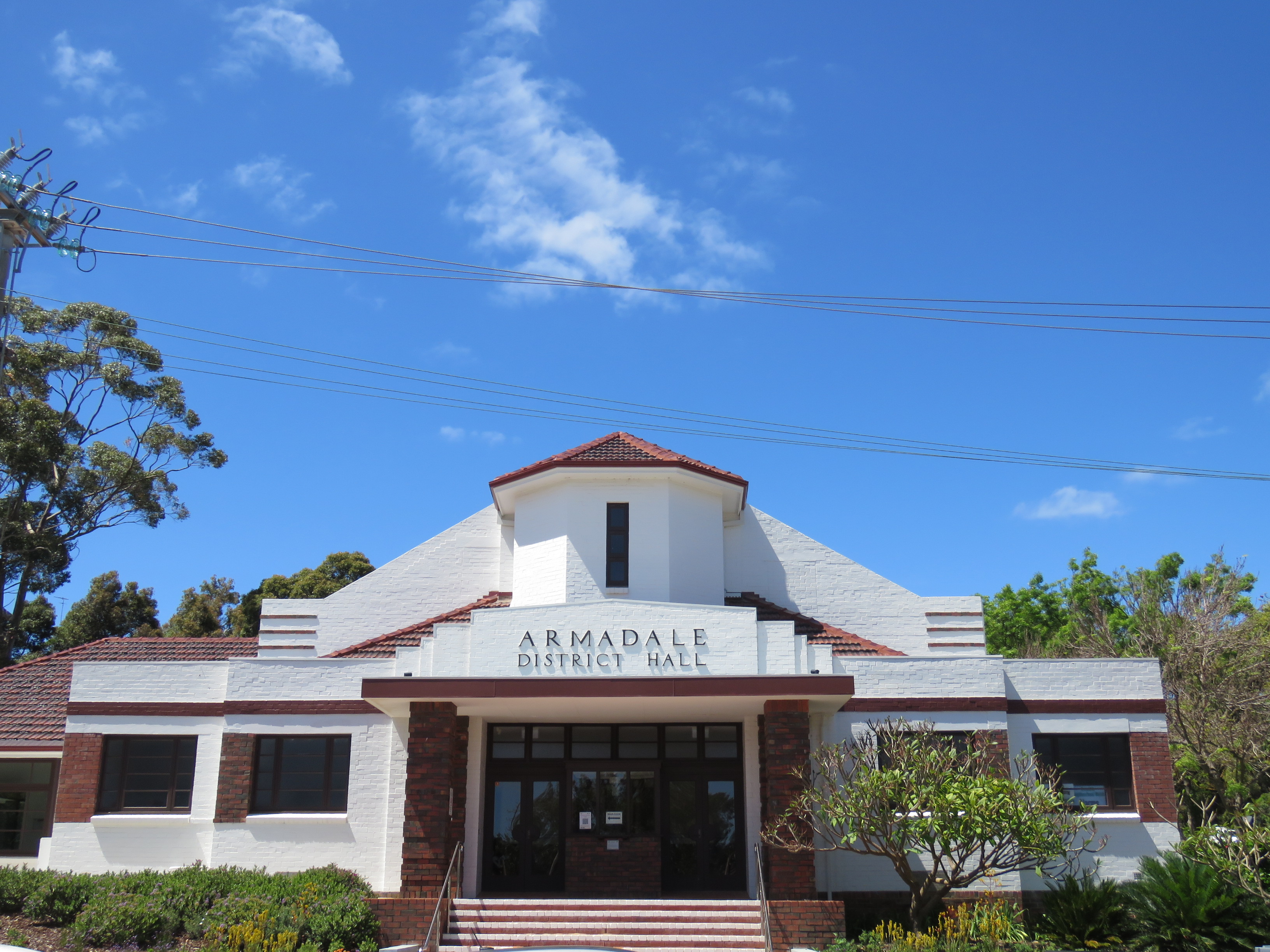
- The state heritage listed Armadale District Hall
- Interactive map of Armadale
- Coordinates: 32°09′11″S 116°00′54″E
- Country: Australia
- State: Western Australia
- City: Perth
- LGA: City of Armadale
- Location: 28 km (17 mi) SE of Perth CBD; 38 km (24 mi) ENE of Rockingham

Government
  - State electorates: Armadale; Darling Range
  - Federal division: Burt

Area
  - Total: 8.4 km^{2} (3.2 sq mi)

Population
  - Total: 13,415 (SAL 2021)
- Postcode: 6112
Suburbs around Armadale
Seville Grove	Kelmscott	Mount Nasura
Haynes	Armadale	Bedfordale
Brookdale	Wungong	Mount Richon

Armadale is a suburb of Perth, Western Australia, within the City of Armadale, located on the south-eastern edge of the Perth metropolitan region. The major junction of the South Western and Albany Highways, which connect Perth with the South West and Great Southern regions respectively, is located within the suburb. It was once the terminus of the Armadale railway line, one of eight major railway lines to service Perth.

== History ==
Plentiful in natural resources, the area now known as Armadale was long occupied by Aboriginal people prior to the founding of the Swan River Colony. Records of encounters with the original Aboriginal inhabitants of this district are sparse in detail, but early on there was conflict between these inhabitants and the settlers, which led to the establishment of a small garrison at Kelmscott. The township of Kelmscott was gazetted in 1830, and for the next sixty years was the administrative and social hub for those colonists who took up land between present-day Kelmscott and Byford.

Interest in settlement at Kelmscott waned soon after the township was established, the district's inaccessibility (no road from Perth having yet been formed) and a general shortage of labour being factors militating against farming in that area. However, several large land grants had been taken up in the district, including one of over 8000 acres (Location 31) initially held by John Adams, and over the next few decades this allocated land presented a constraint to others seeking land for settlement in the area. Parts of these larger allocations were subdivided and on-sold, and smaller allocations were taken up alongside them. Thus, during the 1840s a number of farming properties were established in the foothills along the Canning River, Neerigin Brook, Wongong Brook and Beenyup Brook. Names of these early settlers included White, Stuart, Martin, Armstrong, and Mead.

In the late 1846, the Swan River Colony's first mine was established in the area now known as Armadale. The mine was the first undertaking of the Western Australian Mining Company, formed that year, and the object was to extract lead or copper - the ores of both metals having been in evidence. Land was purchased, and over the next few years shafts were dug by contractors. There was little yield, and in 1850 shareholders resolved to wind up the operation. One of the shafts of this mining venture is still extant south of Bedfordale Hill Road.

By 1835, a road had been surveyed from Perth to Kelmscott and within a few years roads to Albany and Bunbury were also marked out enabling the establishment of overland mail services. However, it was not until 1851 that work began to properly form the road between Perth and Kelmscott. The work was assisted by the arrival of convict labour in 1852, and during the next few years the roads from Kelmscott to Albany and from Kelmscott to Pinjarra were formed. It was at the junction of the roads to Albany and Pinjarra that the township of Armadale was born when an enterprising settler saw opportunity to establish a wayside inn there, some time around 1853. The property was sold to Thomas Saw in 1856, and together with his father-in-law, Henry Gibbs, in 1856 he applied for a wayside licence to sell liquor. Their wayside inn was named the Neerigin Inn after the brook that flowed out of the Darling Range at this point. For many years the district was known as Neerigin or Narrogin, and a hotel bearing this name still stands on the site of the original wayside inn.

In 1889, the northern section of the South Western Railway was constructed from Perth to what is now Armadale, and in 1897 a station was built at this location to service the sparsely scattered population of this district. It has been claimed that the station was named 'Armadale' because a name other than Neerigin had to be found to avoid confusion with the wheatbelt town of Narrogin, and that from this the town which sprang up near the station took its name. Other theories have also been put forward for the origin of the name. What is certain is that the name was not in use before the arrival of the railway.

The railway provided impetus for growth in the district, and in May 1893 local residents held a public meeting to discuss the creation of a roads board that could give attention to the maintenance and development of local roads. At this point in time, roads in the district were the responsibility of the Canning, Fremantle, Jandakot, Murray and Wandering road boards for all of whom it was an outlying and unimportant area. In October 1894, Parliament agreed to the formation of a roads board which on 12 December 1894 was gazetted as the 'Kelmscott Roads Board', later to be the Armadale-Kelmscott Roads Board (1910), the Armadale-Kelmscott Shire Council (1961), then the Armadale Town Council (1979), and now the City of Armadale (1985).

== Natural and cultural attractions ==
The places listed below are Armadale's more popular and accessible natural and cultural attractions. For a more comprehensive list of those places that have been identified as having historic cultural heritage value, refer to the City of Armadale's Municipal Heritage Inventory (MHI). However, the MHI does not include places of natural or Aboriginal heritage value.

- Aboriginal Interpretation Centre, Champion Lakes, Kelmscott. The centre is a space where Nyoongar culture and heritage can be celebrated, discussed, strengthened and understood; and it was designed in consultation with the City of Armadale's Aboriginal and Torres Strait Islander Advisory Committee (ATSIAC).
- Old Jarrah Tree, Armadale Shopping City, corner Third Road and Church Avenue, Armadale. The tree is estimated to be between 400 and 800 years old and for 88 years its surrounds were the Armadale Primary School. The tree is the most ancient of recognizable features in the Armadale CBD) and is one of the more unusual places entered in the W.A. Register of Heritage Places (reference # 09009).
- Cole's Shaft, Summit View (off Bedfordale Hill Road), Mt Richon. Remains of Western Australia's oldest mining venture. This is a place that has been entered in the W.A. Register of Heritage Places (reference # 15263).
- Minnawarra Park, Orchard Avenue, Armadale. The park is home to the History House Museum and the accompanying historic church and school. The school building was relocated from the corner of Third Road and Church Avenue to this site in 1987, in one piece, the first such relocation of a brick structure undertaken in Australia.
- Armadale Settlers Common, Settlers Road (off Canns Road), Armadale. A place with many walk trails and a range of rare flora and fauna.
- Araluen Botanic Park, Roleystone.
- Churchman Brook Dam, Canning Dam and Wungong dam. Three major water reservoirs for the Perth metropolitan area that are of interest for their scenic qualities and engineering heritage.
- Bungendore Park and Wungong Gorge. An area of regenerated bushland of scenic, botanical, and geological interest.
- Schoenstatt Shrine, Talus Drive, Mt Richon. A replica of a place of pilgrimage in Germany.
- Birtwistle Local Studies Library, located inside the Armadale Library: Armadale Central Shopping Centre at Shop 64/10 Orchard Avenue, Armadale.
- Heritage walk from Armadale Railway Station up Jull Street to Narrogin Inn and beyond:

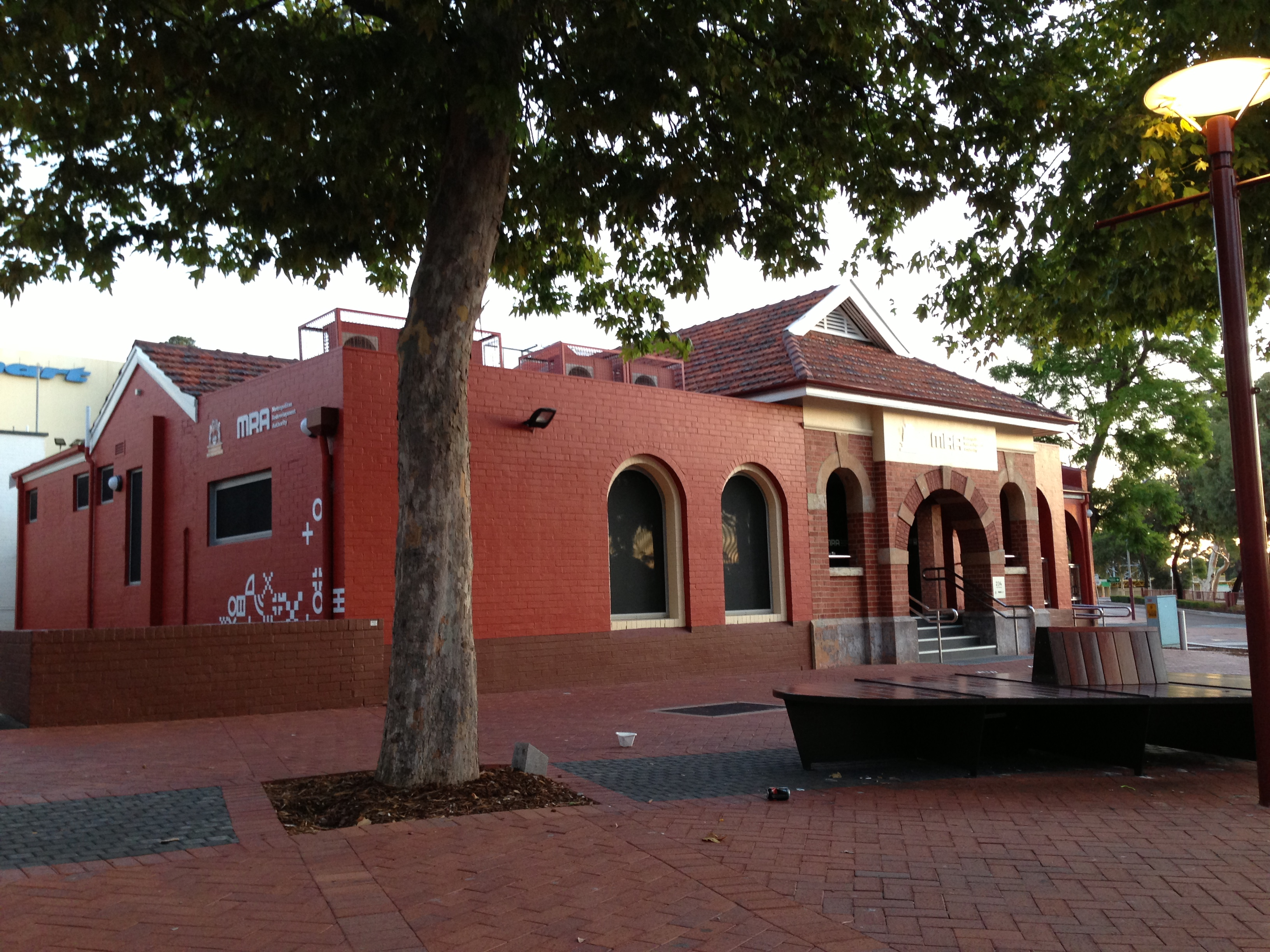
Former telegraph and postal offices

- Former Armadale Post Office (c.1900), south-east corner of Jull Street and Streich Avenue, Armadale. A typical country town post office designed by the PWD under the direction of architect George Temple-Poole (1856 – 1934). The earlier Post and Telegraph Office of 1898, which is now the oldest building standing in Armadale, is attached to the northern side of the building. The building now serves as the regional office of the Department of Fire and Emergency Services.
- Railway Hotel (1902), north-east corner of Jull Street and Streich Avenue, Armadale. Originally a Federation Queen Anne style building, the hotel lost its graceful two-storey verandahs in the 1960s and was 'Tudorized' in the early 1980s when Armadale experienced a craze for mock Tudor buildings. The mock Tudor treatment has since been removed, but remains on the adjoining Fox and Hounds Tavern (a building of the late 1970s, formerly known as the Tudor Rose Tavern).

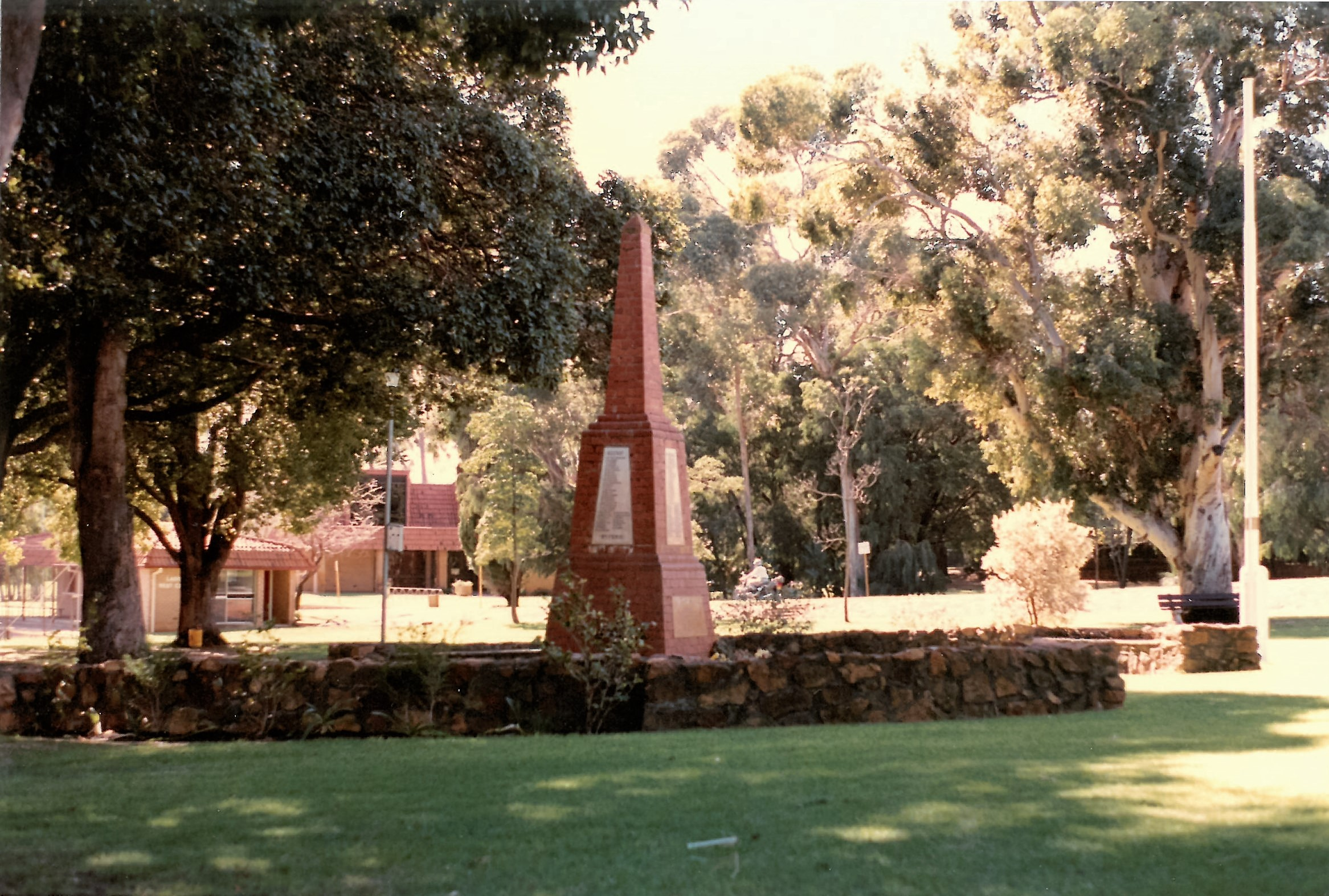
Armadale War Memorial

- Soldiers Memorial Park, Jull Street / Orchard Avenue, Armadale. The oldest landscaped park in Armadale. The brick obelisk is held to be the oldest WWI memorial in Australia, and this together with a grove of mature trees forms the setting for annual Anzac Day commemoration activities.
- Former Shire Council Offices, Jull Street, Armadale. The original 1902 office building is on the south side of the street, and on the north side are the 1967 offices which were designed by W G Bennett, Allen & Allen architects.

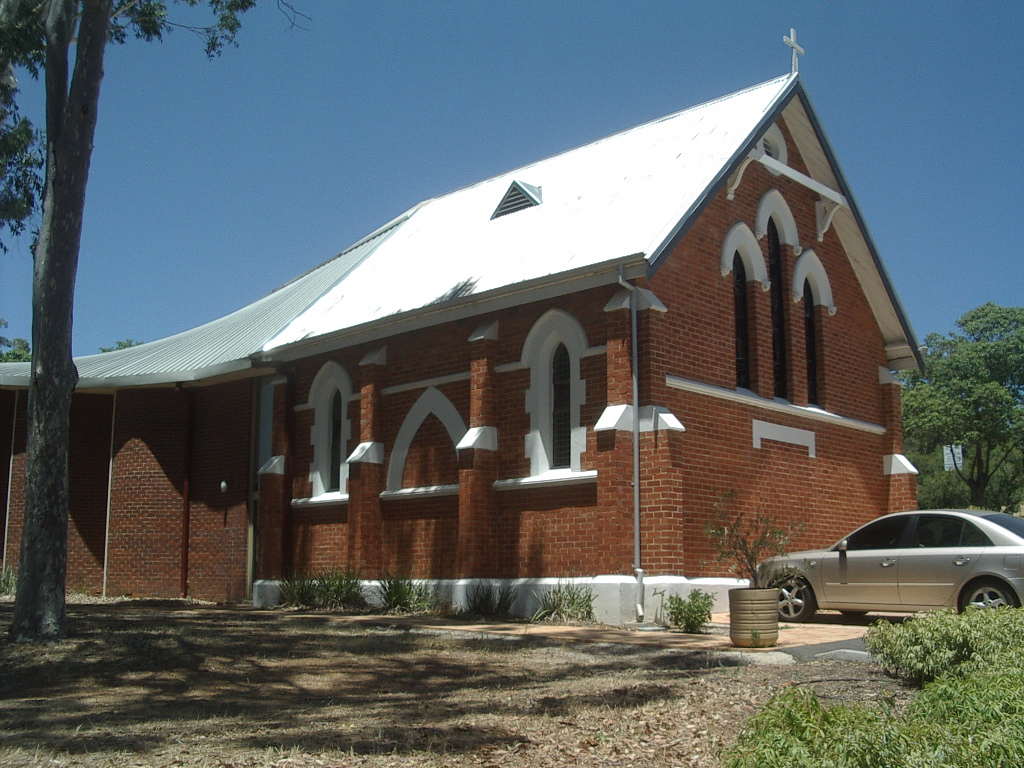
St Matthews Anglican Church

- St Matthews Anglican Church (1904) and old manse. Designed by prominent architect Sir Joseph John Talbot Hobbs (1864-1938), this is the oldest church building in Armadale that is still being used for its intended purpose. The 1960s addition which addresses Prospect Road is by Forbes and Fitzhardinge Architects. The church is entered in the W.A. Register of Heritage Places (reference # 08774).
- Armadale Town Hall (1936). Designed by the architectural partnership of Oldham, Boas & Ednie-Brown. The Town Hall replaced the Mechanics Institute hall (1898), one of the first public buildings in Armadale, which was situated where the carpark is now. The town hall is entered in the W.A. Register of Heritage Places (reference # 04669).
- Bert Tyler Vintage Machinery Museum, Jull Street, Armadale. The local visitor information centre is based here.
- Dr Colyer's house (1952), Jull Street, Armadale. A small house in the English vernacular revival style designed by architect Marshall Clifton (1903 - 1975).
- Narrogin Inn (1936), junction of Albany and South Western Highways. A two storey hotel in the Tudor revival style designed by architect John Berkeley Fitzhardinge (1911-2008). It stands beside the site of the original 1850s wayside inn.
- Muckross Tearooms, South Western Highway. Located just above the Narrogin Inn, this building recalls the era when Perth residents would make weekend outings to Armadale in motor coaches. The building also served as a local gymnasium.
- Pioneer Village, Albany Highway, Armadale. A tourist development of the early 1980s intended to be evocative of an historic goldrush town, similar to Sovereign Hill in Ballarat. There is also a playground for children.
- Elizabethan Village, Canns Road, Bedfordale. A collection of Tudor buildings in mock half-timbering built by Stanley Leopold Fowler in the late 1970s to provide an English themed heritage tourism experience. These buildings, Shakespeare's Birthplace, Anne Hathaway's Cottage and The Cobweb Restaurant (now the Elizabethan Village Pub) replicated original heritage buildings associated with the playwright William Shakespeare in Stratford-upon-Avon, United Kingdom.

== Law and crime ==
Armadale is often regarded as being dangerous and unsafe, with PerthNow calling it Perth's most violent suburb. Red Suburbs rates Armadale a crime ranking of 70/100, where the bigger number means more crime, and also states that probability of being a victim of violent and property crime in Armadale were higher than the state and national probability.

From July to October 2017, Armadale recorded almost 10 assaults every week. In 2017, it was the top metropolitan area for domestic assaults, and fourth for non-domestic assaults behind Fremantle, Northbridge and the Perth CBD. During the COVID-19 pandemic, there was a decline in offences where it reached its lowest in a decade at 3,179 offences during the 2021–2022 financial year. Yet, Armadale still had the fourth highest crime rate per 100,000. Following the pandemic, it recorded 3,879 offences during the 2022–2023 financial year, in which theft was the most commonly committed crime at 1,374 offences.

On 26 September 2019, Minister for Police Michelle Roberts announced the construction on a new Armadale Court House and Police Complex. It would see the relocation of the existing court house and police station into a single complex. Construction was estimated to be complete by 2022. It opened on 2 November 2023 and cost $88.5 million.

== Education ==
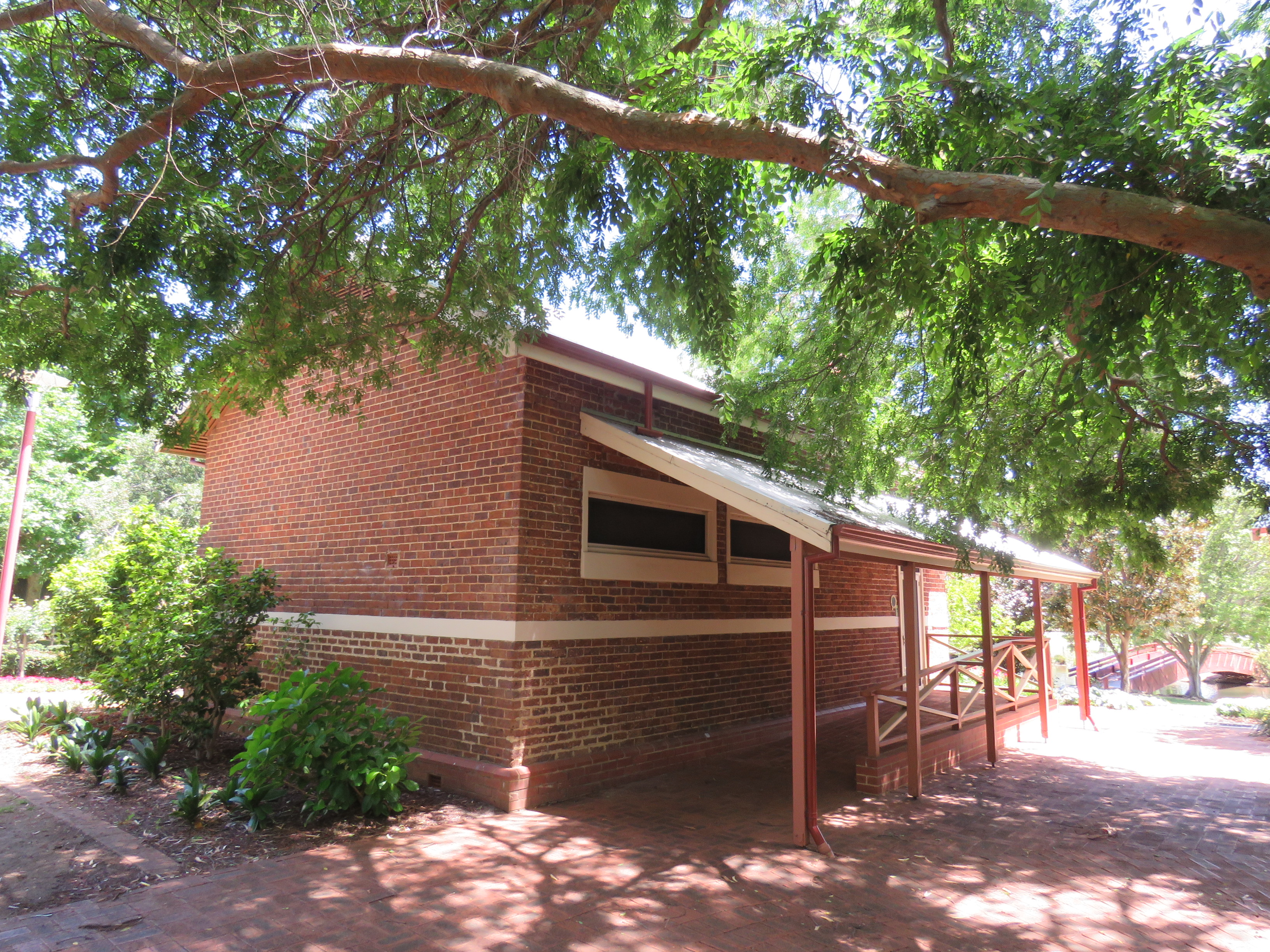
The old Armadale Primary School

Armadale, being an urban centre and transport hub for the surrounding districts, contains a variety of educational institutions. It is home to two state high schools, four state primary schools, three independent schools (one of which extends to year 12), an Australian Trades College campus and a campus of South Metropolitan TAFE (formerly Polytechnic West).

In 1899, Armadale State School was established in the Mechanics Institute Hall which was located on the present-day carpark of the Armadale Town Hall. A purpose-built school building was erected at the intersection of Church and Third Roads in 1900. This was initially a single classroom, but by 1905 a second classroom was added. The district's population increased steadily in the first half of the 20th century, and additional classrooms were added to the school as the need presented. A Roman Catholic School, St Francis Xavier, was established uphill on Third Road in 1938. This school has recently relocated to Forrest Road, Haynes. Following WW2, the population growth was more rapid and the State saw fit to establish a regional high school in Armadale. Armadale Senior High School opened in 1955, initially only as a high school but from 1963 it catered for years 11 and 12).

From 1951, a community of Dutch migrants who were members of the Free Reformed Church settled in the district and they opened a parent run school on Robinhood Avenue in December 1957. Originally catering for years 1 to 6 and known as John Calvin School (now John Calvin Christian College), the campus evolved to incorporate a junior high school, years 11 and 12 in 1988–89, and more recently the primary school functions have relocated to the campuses established at Kelmscott and Byford.

As Armadale's population increased, new State-run primary schools opened: Kingsley (1969), Neerigen Brook (1970), Challis (1974), and Gwynne Park (1978). In 1983, the Pioneer Village School and Dale Christian School opened, the latter having relocated to the site of the former Drive-In Cinema in Brookdale. Other State and private schools have been established in neighbouring population centres of Westfield, Kelmscott, Roleystone and Byford. Other high schools were opened at Kelmscott in the 1970s, West Armadale (Cecil Andrews High School) in 1980, and Roleystone in 1983. Cecil Andrews College is the base of the Australian Air Force Cadets Number 719 Squadron.

In 1987, Armadale Primary School relocated to a new campus on Carradine Road, its current location, and the original school site was cleared to make way for an expansion of Armadale Shopping City. In recognition of its heritage value, the 1899 school building was relocated to Minnawarra Park, its walls and roof lifted and carried to the new site intact, the first known case of a substantial brick structure relocation project undertaken in Australia. The Old Jarrah Tree which used to be in the playground near the 1905 classroom is the only in situ remains at the school's original site. A collection of artefacts recovered from beneath the earliest parts of the school during the move are held by History House Museum and provide tangible insights into school life at Armadale during the early 1900s.

Around 2000, a TAFE Centre was built in Commerce Avenue as part of the South-East Metropolitan College of TAFE; it became a fully functioning campus in 2003 when SEMC merged into Swan TAFE, then become a campus of Polytechnic West and in 2016 merged with Challenger Institute of Technology to become South Metropolitan TAFE. In 2010, the Federal Government opened a campus of the Australian Trades College specialising in carpentry and joinery, cabinet making and electrical trades.

== Climate ==
Climate data for Armadale (precipitation normals for 1986–2016)
Month	Jan	Feb	Mar	Apr	May	Jun	Jul	Aug	Sep	Oct	Nov	Dec	Year
Average precipitation mm (inches)	12.3 (0.48)	15.1 (0.59)	20.1 (0.79)	39.6 (1.56)	102.7 (4.04)	148.2 (5.83)	166.9 (6.57)	124.2 (4.89)	88.3 (3.48)	44.4 (1.75)	29.9 (1.18)	13.6 (0.54)	798.1 (31.42)

== Transport ==
=== Road transport ===
The intersection of four key roads is located at the centre of Armadale:

- Armadale Road (State Route 14) – west to Cockburn Central and Fremantle;
- Albany Highway (State Route 30) – north to Cannington and Perth;
- Albany Highway (State Route 30) – east to Albany;
- South Western Highway (State Route 20) – south to Pinjarra and Bunbury.

=== Public transport ===
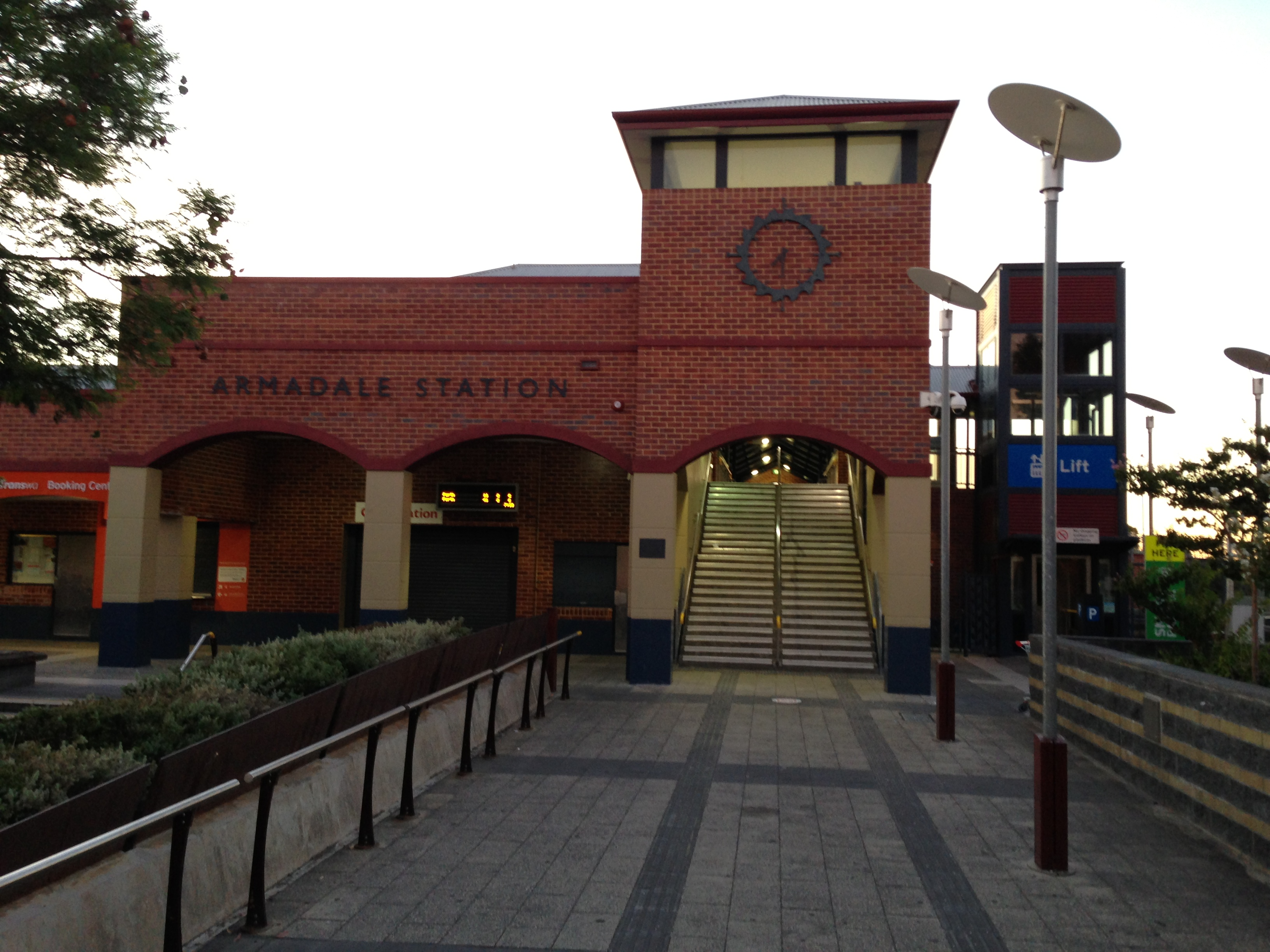
Armadale railway station

Armadale was formerly the terminus of the Armadale railway line (before the line extension to Byford opening in October 2025) which links the suburb to Perth's central business district and the suburban centres of Cannington, Maddington and Gosnells. Its railway station serves as an interchange for Transperth buses, operated by Swan Transit, which serve surrounding areas, as well as a stop on the Australind train to Bunbury.

Bus routes 243–246 serve western Armadale and Cecil Andrews SHS, whilst 249 and 250 serve the southwest. Route 251 serves South Western Highway connecting to Byford Station, and 219/220 service Albany Highway. The 519 travels between Armadale and Murdoch, and the 529 travels between Armadale and Cockburn Centra.

==== Bus ====
- 219 Armadale Station to Kelmscott Station – serves Fourth Road, Church Avenue, Armadale Road and Albany Highway
- 220 Armadale Station to Perth Busport – serves Fourth Road, Church Avenue, Armadale Road and Albany Highway
- 243 Armadale Station to Kelmscott Station – serves Commerce Avenue, Forrest Road, Fifth Road, Gribble Avenue, Seventh Road, Armadale Road and Seville Drive
- 244 Armadale Station to Kelmscott Station – serves Commerce Avenue, Forrest Road, Seventh Road, Dawson Street, Eighth Road, Armadale Road, Seville Drive, Braemore Street and Williams Road
- 245 Armadale Station to Kelmscott Station – serves Fourth Road, Church Avenue, Seventh Road, Armadale Road and Seville Drive
- 246 Armadale Station to Hilbert - serves Forrest Road
- 249 Armadale Station to Hilbert – serves Fourth Road, Church Avenue, Avonlee Road and Townley Street
- 250 Armadale Station to Armadale Station – Circular Route, serves Fourth Road, Church Avenue, Avonlee Road, Duri Street, Tijuana Road, Harber Drive and Townley Street
- 251 Armadale Station to Byford Station - serves Fourth Road and South Western Highway
- 519 Armadale Station to Murdoch TAFE – serves Fourth Road, Church Avenue and Armadale Road
- 529 Armadale Station to Cockburn Central Station – serves Commerce Avenue and Armadale Road

==== Rail ====
- Armadale Line
  - Sherwood Station
  - Armadale Station

== Significant persons associated with Armadale ==
- Joseph Bolitho Johns, aka Moondyne Joe (c. 1826–1900); one of Western Australia's best known bushrangers who hid out in the hills above Armadale-Kelmscott.
- Thomas Saw (1826–1918); founder of the Neerigin Inn and entrepreneur whose family were leaders in the civic and economic development of the district. Thomas Saw arrived in the Swan River Colony in 1848, settling in Claisebrook from where he worked as a carpenter and joiner.
- Arthur Cowell-Stepney (1834–1909); British aristocrat, landowner and politician. In 1896 he became part owner of the vineyard established at Armadale a few years prior, and from 1899 he became the sole owner of this vineyard which he renamed 'Derry NaSura'. Sir Arthur was known for his philanthropic support of Mechanics Institutes (an early form of public library).
- William Lambden Owen (1861–1946); engineer and public servant involved in mining and the development of infrastructure (including railways and lighthouses) in various parts of Western Australia, some time warden of the goldfields (a title he retained), Resident Magistrate, and gentleman farmer in early Armadale. He was the donor of the land on which the Mechanics Institute was built in 1895 which later became the site of the Armadale Town Hall. While living in Armadale, Owen wrote Cossack gold: the chronicles of an early goldfields warden (1933, reprinted 1984). An engineering scholarship in the name of William Lambden Owen is annually offered by the University of Western Australia, having been established by Owen's niece, the late Miss Edith Stewart Gordon.
- Martin Edward Jull (1862–1917); public servant, gentleman farmer and initiator of the subdivision that gave form to the core of the Armadale township. The main street is named after Mr and Mrs (Dr) Jull.
- Henrietta Margaritta Jull (1872–1961); medical professional and social reformer, mother of Henrietta Drake-Brockman (1901–1968)
- Ivor Treharne Birtwistle (1892–1976); journalist, Roleystone resident and shire councillor, and a founder of the local History House Museum. The local studies library is named after him.
- Fred Schonell (1900–1969); educator, former principal of the Armadale Primary School, vice-chancellor of the University of Queensland from 1960 to 1969 (where a road and buildings still bear the names of Sir Fred and his wife, a fellow educator of note), and author or co-author of numerous other spelling and diction books that have been staples for primary education reading in Australia from the 1930s to the present time.
- Vincent Serventy AM (1916–2007); naturalist who was born at and spent part of his childhood in Armadale.
- Janet Holmes à Court AC (born 1943); widow of Robert Holmes à Court (d.1990), Janet Holmes à Court is an Australian businesswoman, philanthropist, and one of Australia's wealthiest women. She is the Chairman of one of Australia's largest private companies, Heytesbury Pty Ltd. She owns property in Bedfordale in the hills east of Armadale.
- Rod Marsh MBE (1947–2022); professional cricketer who played as a wicketkeeper for the Australian national team, born and raised in Armadale.
- Ben Cousins (born 1978); a former Australian rules footballer and Brownlow medallist, best known for his 270-game career with West Coast Eagles and Richmond in the Australian Football League (AFL).
