= List of State Register of Heritage Places in the Shire of Serpentine-Jarrahdale =

The State Register of Heritage Places is maintained by the Heritage Council of Western Australia. As of 2026, 135 places are heritage-listed in the Shire of Serpentine-Jarrahdale, of which five are on the State Register of Heritage Places.

== List ==
=== State Register of Heritage Places ===
The Western Australian State Register of Heritage Places, as of 2026, lists the following five state registered places within the Shire of Serpentine-Jarrahdale:

Place name	Place #	Location	Suburb or town	Co-ordinates	Built	State registered	Notes	Photo
Mill Manager's Residence	4615	1 Foster Way	Jarrahdale	32°20′10″S 116°03′40″E	1871	14 May 1999	Example of a Western Australian vernacular design of Victorian-Georgian residential style of architecture	
Serpentine General Store	3866	6 Wellard Street	Serpentine	32°21′51″S 115°58′41″E	1926	8 May 2007	Also referred to as Middleton's Store, Middleton's Tearooms; An irregularly planned group of vernacular buildings	
Spencer's Cottage	3302	Lot 79 Falls Road, at the junction of Carralong Brook and Serpentine River	Serpentine	32°21′44″S 116°01′29″E	1860	11 October 1994	Also referred to as Carralong Cottage; Cottage from the early farming phase of the area and surrounding orchard	
Turner Cottage	2360	Corner Karnup Road & South Western Highway	Serpentine	32°21′48″S 115°59′28″E	1856	9 May 1997	Also referred to as Bridge Farm; Single-storey brick and shingle farmhouse	
Whitby Falls Hostel	8604	South Western Highway	Whitby	32°17′35″S 116°00′55″E	1854	16 May 2008	Also referred to as Hospital for the Insane/Lunatic Asylum, Whitby Falls Estate, Whitby/Whitby Falls Home; Collection of buildings, including a group of brick and stone vernacular farm buildings	

=== Shire of Serpentine–Jarrahdale heritage-listed places ===
The following places are heritage listed in the Shire of Serpentine–Jarrahdale but are not State registered:

Place name	Place #	Street #	Street name	Suburb or town	Notes & former names	Photo
St Stephen's Anglican Church	2357		Serpentine Falls Road Corner South Western Highway	Serpentine		
Serpentine Falls Hotel	2358	Corner	Richardson & Wellard Streets	Serpentine	The Old Serpentine Tavern	
Baldwins Cottage	2359	2464	South Western Highway	Serpentine	Staging Post and Inn	
St Paul's Anglican Church	2362		Atkins Street	Jarrahdale		
Byford Uniting Presbyterian Church	2363	9-39	Clifton Street	Byford	Armadale North Murray Parish	
St Aidan's Anglican Church & Church Hall	2364	19	Clifton Street	Byford		
Mundijong Hotel	2365	32	Paterson Street	Mundijong	Mundijong Tavern, George Worner's Mundijong Hotel	
Mundijong Uniting Church	2366	18	Paterson Street	Mundijong	Mundijong & District Community Church	
Mundijong Townsite	2584		Paterson, Richardson & Cockram Streets	Mundijong		
Old Post Office Museum Wash-house and Out-house	2874		Jarrahdale Road	Jarrahdale	Old Post Office and Telegraph Office	
Mundijong railway station	3129		Paterson Street	Mundijong	Mundijong Junction, Jarrahdale Junction	
Lowlands Homestead	3307	509	Lowlands Road	Mardella	Serpentine Farm	
Masonic Hall	3922	32	Butcher Street	Mundijong	Jarrahdale Lodge	
Old Serpentine Cemetery	4048	2427	South Western Highway	Serpentine		
Reserve	4049	Corner	South Western Highway & Gordon Road	Serpentine		
Old Serpentine Settlement	4050		Gordon Road, Falls Road, Karnup Road & South Western Highway	Serpentine	Serpentine Conservation Area, Serpentine Townsite Precinct	
Serpentine (Bridge) School (former)	4051	8	Gordon Road	Serpentine	Serpentine School, Old Bridge School	
Serpentine Dam	4174			Serpentine		
Port Jackson Fig	4385		Gordon Street	Serpentine		
Olive & Carob Trees, Wungong Farm	4386		South Western Highway	Byford		
Naval Armament Depot	4496		Nettleton Road	Byford	AQIS	
Jarrahdale Railway Cutting	4503		Alcoa Road	Jarrahdale		
Brickwood Bushland	4504		South Western Highway	Byford		
Cardup Bushland	4505	3 km South		Byford		
Bodhinyana Buddhist Monastery	7196	216	Kingsbury Dr	Serpentine	Bodhinyana Forrest Monastery	
Brickworks Railway Bridge (former), Byford	8478		Millbrace Glen	Byford		
Bateman Homestead	8479	Corner	Kargotich & Thomas Roads	Byford		
Nairn's House	8480		Kiln Road	Byford	Lazenby's Old Farmhouse	
Burnbrae Orphanage	8481		Junction of Nettleton & Admiral Roads	Byford	Braemar Farm, Quo Vadis	
Manjedal Brook	8482	Between	Nettleton & Kargotich Roads	Byford		
Millrace Farmhouse	8483		Nettleton Road, beside Beenyup Brook	Byford		
Redgum Patch	8484	Corner	Alice & Redcliffe Roads	Cardup		
Mead's House	8485	325	Kiln Road	Karrakup	Lake View	
Italian Prisoner of War Camp	8486		Balmoral Road	Jarrahdale	Site of POW Camp	
Gooralong Park & Flour Mill Site	8487		Chestnut Road	Jarrahdale	Batts or Gooralong Mill	
Jarrahdale Townsite & Heritage Park	8488		Millars, Jarrahdale & Staff Roads	Jarrahdale	Jarrahdale Townsite	
St Maria Goretti Catholic Church	8489	21	Atkins Street	Jarrahdale		
Jarrahdale Tavern	8491		Jarrahdale Road	Jarrahdale	Murray Arms Hotel	
Buckland's Cottage	8492	16	Rhodes Place	Jarrahdale	Mill Brook Historical Cottage	
Ivan Elliot's Shearing Shed	8493		Hopelands Road	Keysbrook		
Keysbrook Farmhouse	8494		South Western Highway	Keysbrook		
Old Bolinda Vale Farmhouse	8495		South Western Highway	Keysbrook		
Whollogan's Bakers	8496	50	Paterson Street	Mundijong		
Old Mundijong Hotel	8497	Corner	Paterson Street & Mundijong Road	Mundijong	Serpentine Hotel	
The Nook	8498	Lot 1	Roman Road	Mundijong	Szczecinski's Cottage	
McKay's House	8499		Summerfield Road	Serpentine	Eton Farm	
Longbottom's Cottage (Ruins)	8600		Gordon Road	Serpentine	Serpentine Falls Farm	
Bishop Hale's Cottage	8601	27	Gordon Road	Serpentine	Lefroy's Cottage, Longbottoms Cottage	
Cheese Factory	8602		Hall Road	Serpentine	Serpentine Falls Cheese & Butter Factory Ltd fm, Serpentine Falls Cheese Factory (former)	
Jarrah Road Swamp, Serpentine West	8603		Jarrah Road	Serpentine		
Jarrahdale Inn (former)	8605	Corner	South Western Highway & Kiernan Street	Mundijong	Whitby Falls Coach House	
Wungong Farm Cottage	8606		Bruns Drive	Darling Downs	Hall Homestead/Brun's Holding	
Perretts Bushland	8607			Jarrahdale		
Yangeddi Swamp	8608			Jarrahdale	Yangedi Swamp	
Jarrahdale General Store	8611	81	Jarrahdale Road	Jarrahdale		
Two CALM Houses	8612	Lot 29, 30	Brady Street	Jarrahdale		
Eight CALM Houses	8613		Forrest Avenue	Jarrahdale		
Teacher's Quarters (former)	8614	8	Gordon Road	Serpentine		
Manjedal School (former)	8615	12	Paterson Street	Mundijong	Mundijong School	
CALM House	8616		Jarrahdale Road	Jarrahdale		
Road Board Building (former)	8617	10	Paterson Street	Mundijong	Library	
Brick Kilns	8619	51	Kiln Road	Byford	Austral Bricks, Metro Brick	
Mundijong Post Office (former)	8621	26	Paterson Street	Mundijong	Dot's Teagarden	
Six Mill Houses	8622		Jarrahdale Road	Jarrahdale		
Residence	8623		Mundijong Road near Adonis Road	Mundijong		
Railway Cottage (former)	8624	68	Roman Road	Mundijong		
Butcher Shop	8625	19	Richardson Street	Serpentine	Post Office	
Two Residences	8626	1409	Karnup Road	Serpentine		
The Chestnuts	8627		Chestnut Road	Jarrahdale		
Jarrahdale School	8628		Wanliss Street	Jarrahdale		
Hopeland School	8629		Hopeland Road	Hopeland	Hopeland Community Hall	
Jarrahdale Cemetery	8630		Atkins Road	Jarrahdale		
Brooklyn Farm	8631		Lowlands Road	Mardella		
Jarrah Road Reserve	8632		Jarrah Road West off Punrak Road	Serpentine		
Summerfield Cottage	8633		Gordon Road	Serpentine		
Jarrahdale to Rockingham Railway	9250		Jarrahdale Road to Val Street	Jarrahdale to Rockingham	Jarrahdale to Rockingham, 1872 Heritage Railway	
Kargotich Dairy	9625	681	Hopkinson Road	Byford	Fremnells Dairy	
Anglican Rectory	11582	86	Paterson Street	Mundijong		
Jarrahdale War memorial	13051		Jarrahdale Road	Jarrahdale		
Byford War Memorial	13052		South Western Highway	Byford		
Byford Honour Roll, Byford Hall	13058		South Western Highway	Byford		
St Kevin's Church	13088		Richardson Street	Serpentine		
Jarrahdale Honour Rolls, Bruno Gianetti Memorial Hall	14036		Munro Street	Jarrahdale		
Mundijong Honour Roll, Mundijong Community Hall	14042		Paterson Street	Mundijong		
Serpentine Honour Roll, Clem Kentish Community Hall	14085		Wellard Road	Serpentine		
Lowlands & Riverlea Bushland – part	14370	6 km North West of		Serpentine		
Touchwood Cottage	16615	354	Soldier's Road	Cardup		
Railway House (former)	16796		Turner Road	Byford		
Jarrahdale Heritage Park	17287			Jarrahdale		
Old Serpentine Inn	17806	Corner	Richardson and Wellard Streets	Serpentine		
Mill Site and Timber Store	17807		Millars Road	Jarrahdale		
CALM Houses	17808		Brady Street, Forrest Avenue, Jarrahdale Road	Jarrahdale		
Workers' Cottages and Quarters	17809		Millars & Staff Roads	Jarrahdale		
Monadnocks Conservation Park	18697		Albany Highway	Gleneagle Via Jarrahdale		
Serpentine National Park	18728		South Western Highway	Serpentine		
Percy's Place	18778	Lot 316	South Western Highway	Byford	RAN Depot 40, Naval Depot	
Manjedal Brook Road Bridge	18793		Old South Western Highway	Whitby Falls	Bridge 121	
Fremnells Dairy	24405	681	Hopkinson Road	Cardup		
Karnet Prison Farm Staff Housing	25575	13-18	Kingsbury Drive	Serpentine		
Karnet Prison Farm	25640			Keysbrook		
Bridge 4361, Jarrahdale Road, Jarrahdale	26119		Jarrahdale Road	Jarrahdale		
Bridge 4536A, over Gooralong Brook, Jarrahdale Road, Jarrahdale	26218		Jarrahdale Road	Jarrahdale		
Bridge 4453, Thomas & Kargotich Road over Birriga Drain, Oakford	26286		Thomas & Kargotich Road	Oakford		
Wellstrand Farm	27285	29	Taylor Road	Mundijong		
Rudall's (Perringa Stud)	27286	63 & 34	Summerfield Road & Parry Road	Serpentine		
Old Post Office	27287	11	Wellard Street	Serpentine		
Serpentine Town Dam	27288		Hart Road	Serpentine		
Wungong Farm Homestead	27292	80	Bruns Drive	Darling Downs		
Frank Lupino Park and Monument	27295		South Western Highway	Whitby		
Terry's Shop	27296	16	Wellard Street	Serpentine		
Serpentine School	27297	51	Lefroy Street	Serpentine		
Yoothamurra Homestead	27298	743	Abernethy Road	Oakford		
Mundijong Police Station	27299	29	Anstey Street	Mundijong		
R.A.N houses (former)	27300	907,909 & 911	South Western Highway	Byford		
School Master's House, Mundijong (fmr)	27301	14	Paterson Street	Mundijong		
Mardella Post Office and Store	27302	373	Wright Road	Mardella		
Mardella Hall and Fire Station	27303	365	Wright Road	Mardella		
Keysbrook Cricket Pitch	27304	Lot 76	Elliott Road	Keysbrook		
Keysbrook General Store	27305	2	Elliott Road	Keysbrook		
Byford Primary School and Large Tree	27308	36	Clifton Street	Byford		
Byford Hall (former)	27348	858	South Western Highway	Byford	Serpentine Jarrahdale Library	
Briggs Park, Byford (former show grounds)	27349	38	Mead Street	Byford		
1st Brick House, Byford	27350	14	Mead Street	Byford	Belmount House	
Old Rifle Range, Byford	27351	92	Linton Street North	Byford		
Master's Dairy, Darling Downs	27352	2127	Thomas Road	Darling Downs		
Teacher's Residence, Hopeland	27353	590	Hopeland Road	Hopeland		
Hopeland School Cricket Pitch	27354	289	Hopeland Road	Hopeland		
Byford State Brickworks Scar	27569	96	Beenyup Road	Byford		
Eddie the Bull's water trough	27570			Byford		
Post Office / Fish and Chip Shop	27571	28	Paterson Street	Mundijong	Armadale-Kelmscott Co-operative Society Branch Store	
