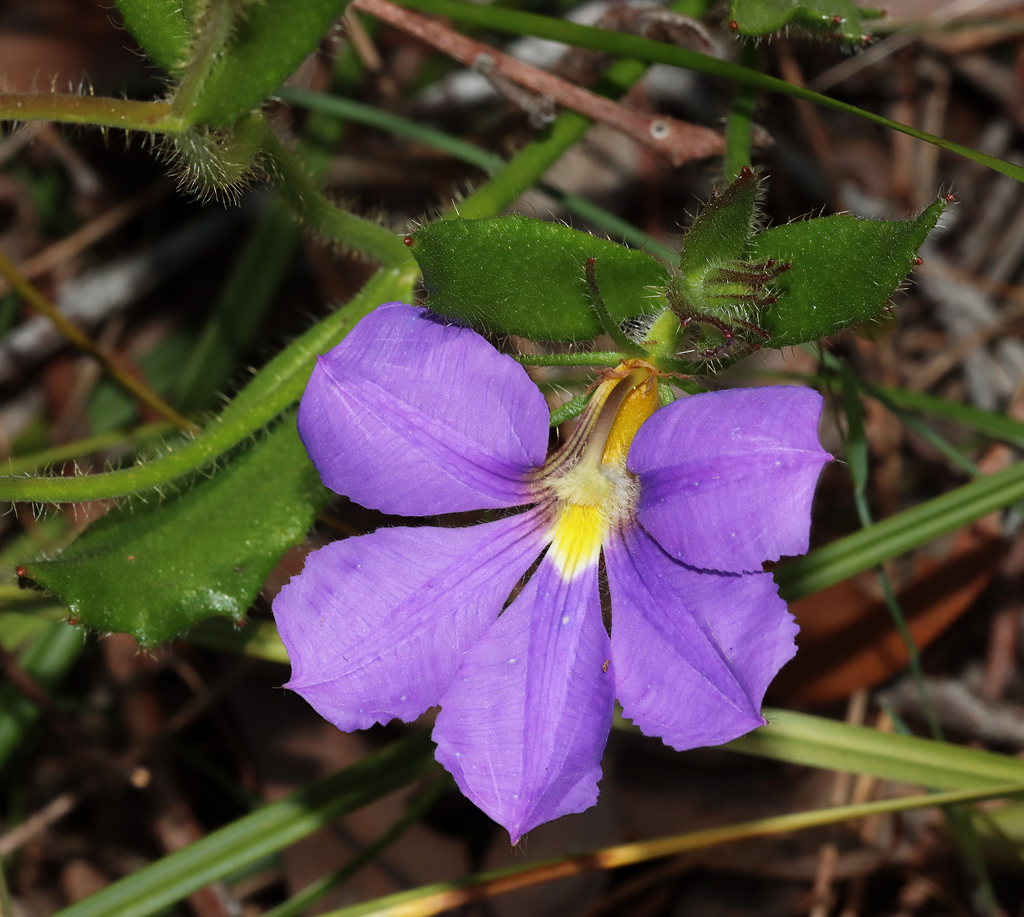
- In Mundijong

Scientific classification
- Kingdom: Plantae
- Clade: Embryophytes
- Clade: Tracheophytes
- Clade: Angiosperms
- Clade: Eudicots
- Clade: Asterids
- Order: Asterales
- Family: Goodeniaceae
- Genus: Scaevola
- Species: S. calliptera

Binomial name
- Scaevola calliptera Benth.
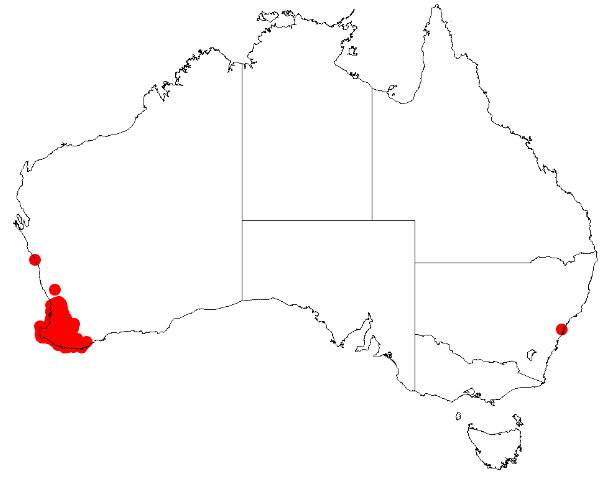
- Occurrence data from Australasian Virtual Herbarium

Synonyms
- Scaevola benthamea de Vriese; Scaevola macropoda DC.; Scaevola striata auct. non R.Br.: Erickson, R., George, A.S., Marchant, N. & Morcombe, M.

= Scaevola calliptera =

Species of shrub

Scaevola calliptera is a species of flowering plant in the family Goodeniaceae and is endemic to the south-west of Western Australia. It is an erect herb with sessile, lance-shaped to narrowly oblong leaves, blue to purple flowers and elliptic, warty fruit.

== Description ==
Scaevola calliptera is an erect herb up to 40 cm (16 in) tall and covered with glandular and simple hairs. The leaves are sessile, lance-shaped with the narrower end towards the base, to narrowly oblong with toothed edges, 20–60 mm (0.79–2.36 in) long and 4–25 mm (0.16–0.98 in) wide. The flowers arranged in racemes or thyrses up to 300 mm (12 in) long, each flower on a peduncle 20–75 mm (0.79–2.95 in) long with leafy bracts 5–10 mm (0.20–0.39 in) long and elliptic to narrowly oblong, toothed bracteoles 10–35 mm (0.39–1.38 in) long. The sepals are linear, 6–16 mm (0.24–0.63 in) long and free from each other. The petals are blue to purple with a yellow throat, 17–30 mm (0.67–1.18 in) long and densely bearded inside. Flowering mainly occurs from August to December, and the fruit is elliptic, warty up to 6 mm (0.24 in) long and hairy.

== Taxonomy ==
Scaevola calliptera was first formally described in 1837 by George Bentham in Enumeratio plantarum quas in Novae Hollandiae ora austro-occidentali ad fluvium Cygnorum et in sinu Regis Georgii collegit Carolus Liber Baro de Hügel from specimens collected by Charles von Hügel in the Swan River Colony. The specific epithet (calliptera) means 'beautiful', referring to the petals.

== Distribution and habitat ==
This species of Scaevola is found in forest, woodland and heath from Bullsbrook to the south coast in the Esperance Plains, Jarrah Forest, Swan Coastal Plain and Warren bioregions of south-western Western Australia.

== Conservation status ==
Scaevola calliptera is listed as 'not threatened' by the Government of Western Australia Department of Biodiversity, Conservation and Attractions.
