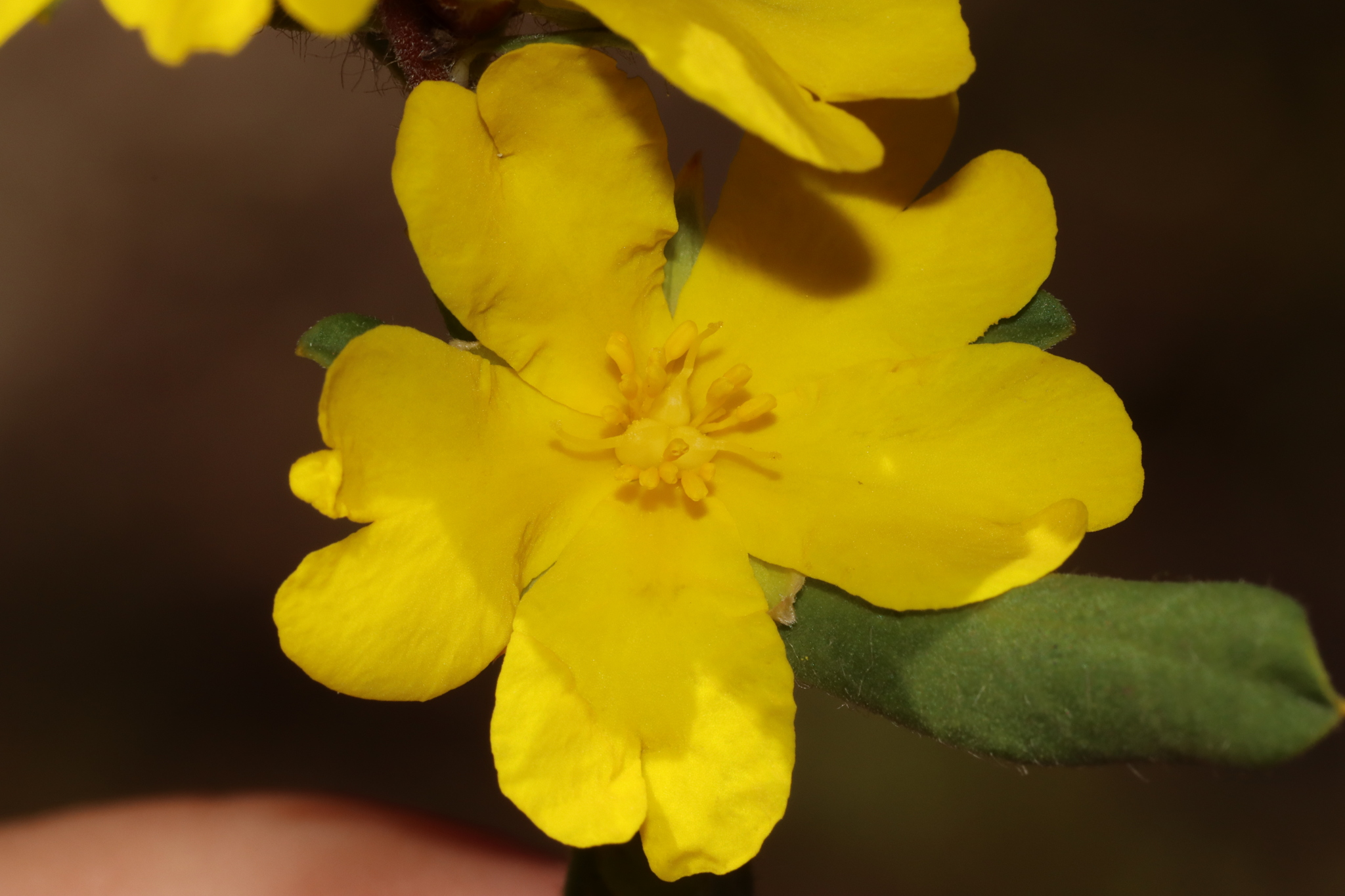
- Near Jarrahdale

Scientific classification
- Kingdom: Plantae
- Clade: Tracheophytes
- Clade: Angiosperms
- Clade: Eudicots
- Order: Dilleniales
- Family: Dilleniaceae
- Genus: Hibbertia
- Species: H. ovata

Binomial name
- Hibbertia ovata Steud.

= Hibbertia ovata =

Species of flowering plant

Hibbertia ovata is a species of flowering plant in the family Dilleniaceae and is endemic to Western Australia. It is an ascending or erect, spreading shrub that typically grows to a height of 10–60 cm (3.9–23.6 in). It flowers from July to November and has yellow flowers. It was first formally described in 1845 by Ernst Gottlieb von Steudel in Lehmann's Plantae Preissianae. The specific epithet (ovata) means "wider below the middle", referring to the leaves.

This species is found on the Darling Scarp in the Jarrah Forest and Swan Coastal Plain biogeographic regions of south-western Western Australia.

== See also ==
- List of Hibbertia species
