= Oldbury, Western Australia =

Oldbury Perth, Western Australia
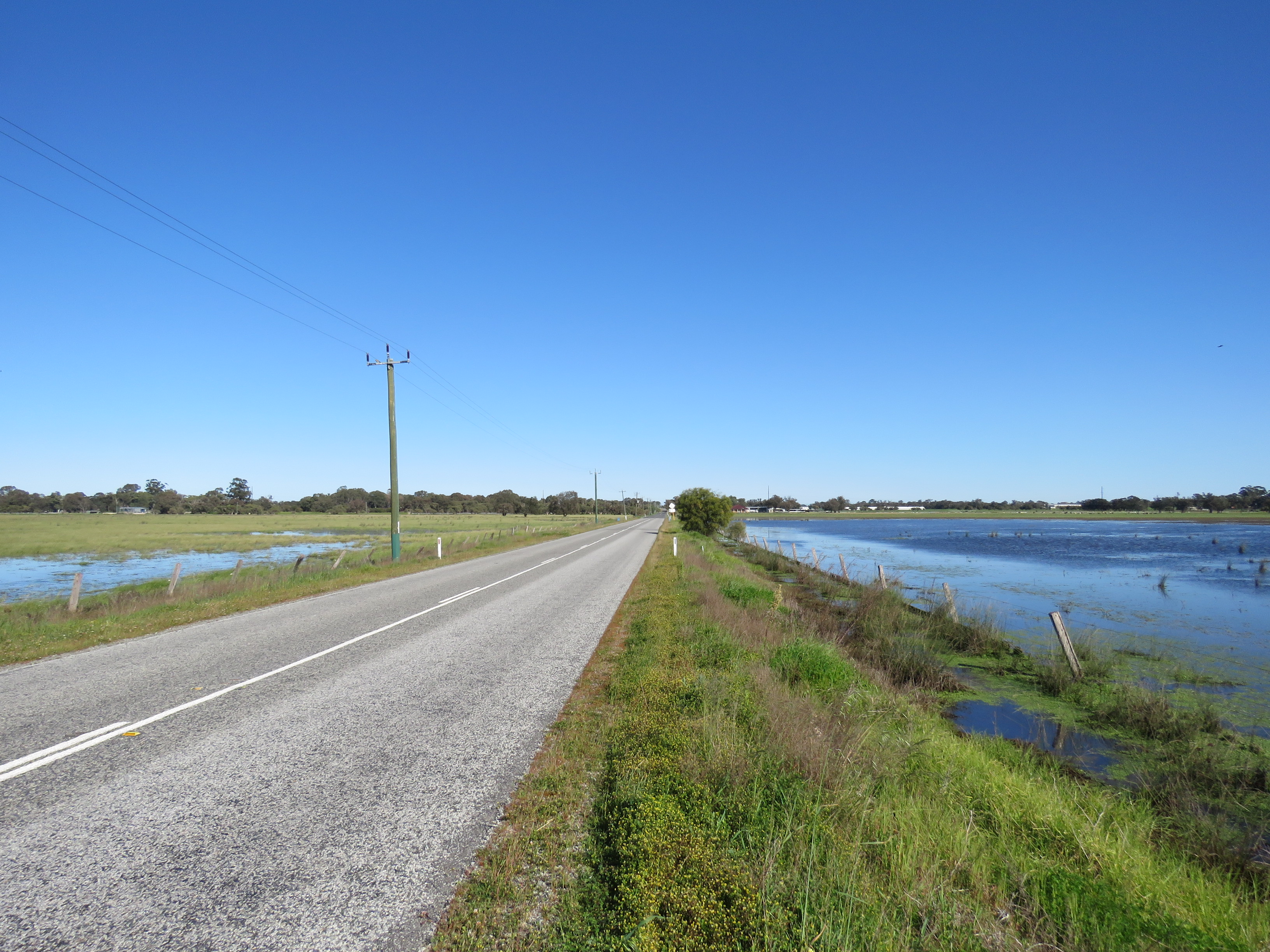
- Gossage Road in predominantly rural Oldbury in August 2022
- Coordinates: 32.263°S 115.916°E
- Population: 296 (SAL 2021)
- Postcode(s): 6121
- Area: 41.1 km^{2} (15.9 sq mi)
- LGA(s): Shire of Serpentine-Jarrahdale
- State electorate(s): Darling Range
- Federal division(s): Canning
Suburbs around Oldbury:
Casuarina	Oakford	Oakford
Wellard	Oldbury	Cardup
Baldivis	Mardella	Mundijong

Oldbury is a district to the south of Perth, Western Australia, within the Peel region. It has no central township, and lies west of the South Western Highway, close to Byford and Mundijong. Part of the Pinjarra Plain, the district is a productive environment featuring dairy and rural engagements, although consisting of sandy soils and largely felled. The area was part of the Group Settlement Scheme, being established in 1922 as Group 35, along with the drainage scheme that contributed to the Peel Estuary environmental task and the consequent Dawesville Cut. Oldbury is part of a major realigning process in the Perth metro area, as divisions of regional land and urban districts develop, boundaries maintained since European settlement. It was established as a locality name on 1 May 1997.
