= Rob Coales =

Australian politician

Shire President of Serpentine-Jarrahdale
- Incumbent
- Assumed office 21 October 2023
- Deputy: Tricia Duggin
- Preceded by: Michelle Rich

Councillor of Shire of Serpentine-Jarrahdale for North Ward
- Incumbent
- Assumed office 21 October 2017

Personal details
- Other political affiliations: Liberal
- Children: 2

Military service
- Allegiance: Australia
- Branch/service: Australian Army
- Years of service: 1997 - 2017

Rob Coales (born 1976) is an Australian politician and the current president of the Shire of Serpentine-Jarrahdale since election victory in 2023, becoming the Shire's first directly-elected leader. Coales was a member of the Western Australian Police Force as a police sergeant.

== Police and military career ==
Rob Coales was born in 1976 in Western Australia, where he also grew up in. He attended Christ Church Grammar School in Perth.

Coales graduated with a Bachelor of Arts in politics from Murdoch University and Graduate Certificate of Transnational Crime Prevention from the University of Wollongong. He then achieved a Diploma of Policing through the Australian Federal Police.

Coales served in the Australian Army Reserve from 1997 to 2017, where he became the Battery Commander of 3 Light Battery of the Artillery Reserve Unit in 13th Brigade. In 2008, Coales was deployed to the Solomon Islands on a peacekeeping mission as part of the Regional Assistance Mission to Solomon Islands.

== Political career ==
=== State politics ===
In the 2017 Western Australian state election, Coales contested the Electorate District of Thornline for the Liberal party. He was inspired by Andrew Hastie becoming the MP for Canning. The West Australian described one of his election songs as cheesy. He lost to Labor candidate Chris Tallentire, receiving only 5,682 votes (24.96%).

In the 2018 Darling Range by-election, Coales - who was still a councillor for the Shire of Serpentine-Jarrahdale - attempted to seek the Liberal candidacy for the state electorate. However, the candidacy ended up going to Alyssa Hayden, who went on to win the election.

In 2024, Coales said that he was not planning to contest both the electoral districts of Darling Range and Oakford in the 2025 state elections, but did not entirely rule out the possibility of him running for a seat in the future.

=== Councillor of Serpentine-Jarrahdale ===
Rob Coales was elected in the 2017 Shire of Serpentine-Jarrahdale local election as a councillor for the North Ward. Coales was sworn in on 23 October.

Following the 2021 local election, Coales led calls for an investigation into possible fraud during the election.

=== Shire President ===
In the 2023 Shire of Serpentine-Jarrahdale local election on 21 October, Rob Coales and incumbent Michelle Rich were the only contestants for Shire President. The election saw Coales defeat Rich with a margin of 2,182 votes (69.8%). His win marked the first time the Shire directly elected a Shire President. Following his win, Coales said he would reduce his duties as a police officer. He was sworn in with his deputy president, Tricia Duggin. He has said one of his main focus is to change public perception of the shire government. The local election saw only a 14% turnout. Coales being elected as president is likely to trigger a by-election in North Ward.

In late December 2023, Coales opposed a motion by Cr Morgan Byas to allow greater transparency with the public, saying that the council was already on the path to more transparency and that too much transparency might hinder councillors. The motion was lost 4:2.
