= Cardup, Western Australia =

Cardup
- Suburb
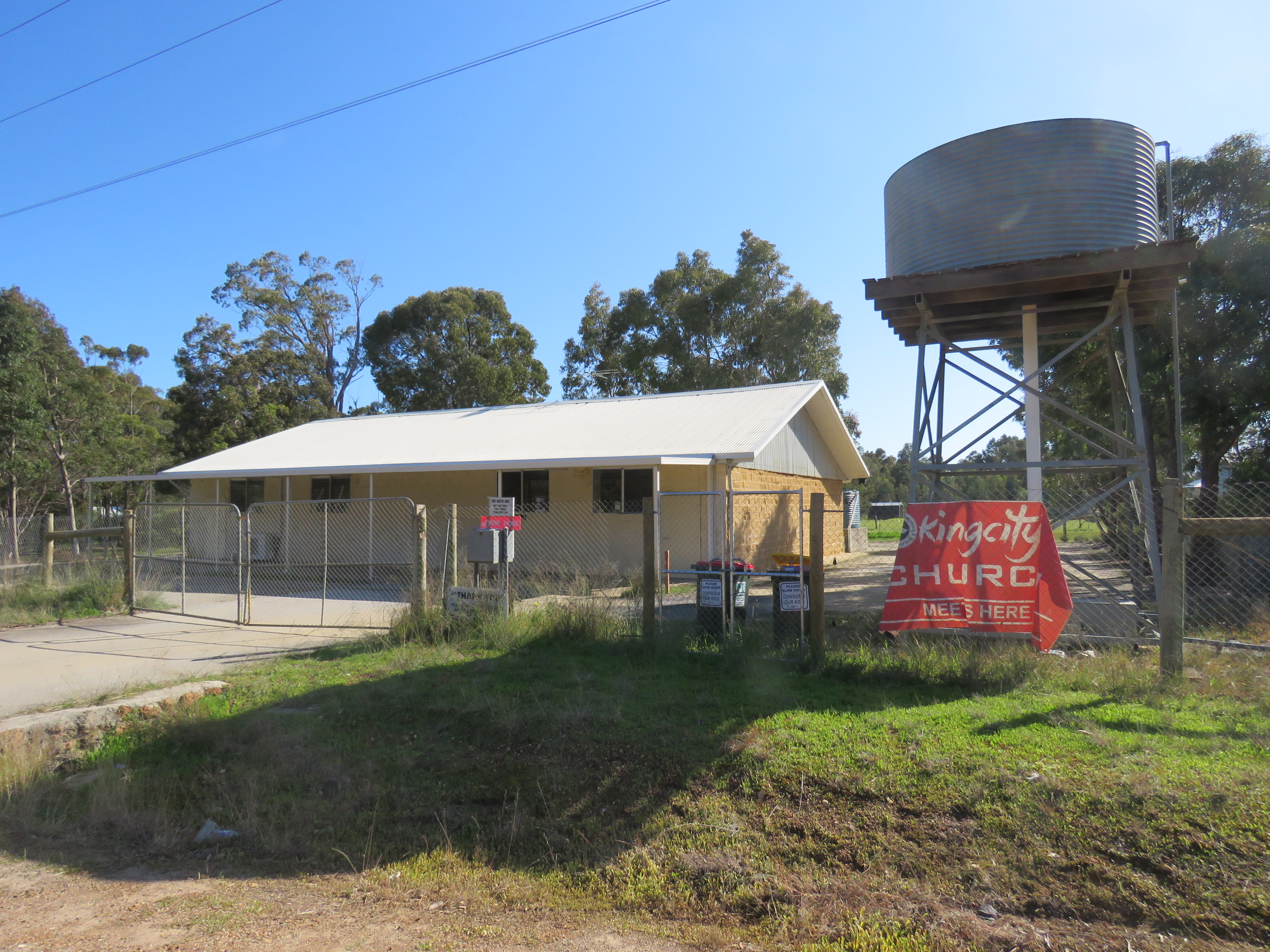
- Baker Hall in Cardup in August 2022
- Interactive map of Cardup
- Coordinates: 32.284°S 115.973°E
- Country: Australia
- State: Western Australia
- City: Perth
- LGA: Shire of Serpentine-Jarrahdale
- Location: 48 km (30 mi) from Perth; 4 km (2.5 mi) from Mundijong
- Established: 1927

Government
  - State electorate: Darling Range
  - Federal division: Canning

Area
  - Total: 19.0 km^{2} (7.3 sq mi)

Population
  - Total: 1,163 (SAL 2021)
- Postcode: 6123
Suburbs around Cardup
Oakford	Oakford	Byford
Oldbury	Cardup	Karrakup
Oldbury	Mundijong	Whitby

Cardup is an outer suburb of the Western Australian capital city of Perth, located in the Shire of Serpentine-Jarrahdale to the north of the town Mundijong. In the 2011 census, it had a population of 972 people.

== History ==
In 1844, surveyor Robert Austin recorded that Cockburn Sound Location 22 was called Cardoup. The brook joining the northern boundary of this location has been shown at various times as either Cardoup or Cadup Brook. In 1851, the location was purchased by H. Mead, who gave his address as Cardup and this spelling was used for the brook on most subsequent plans and surveys. By 1927, a railway siding had been erected nearby and was called Cardup after the brook and although the siding is no longer in use, the place still retains the name. Cardup is an Aboriginal name said to mean 'place of the racehorse goanna' (Kurda).

== Transport ==
=== Bus ===
- 259 Mundijong to Byford Station – serves Soldiers Road
- 262 Jarrahdale to Byford Station – serves Soldiers Road
