= Mardella =

Mardella Perth, Western Australia
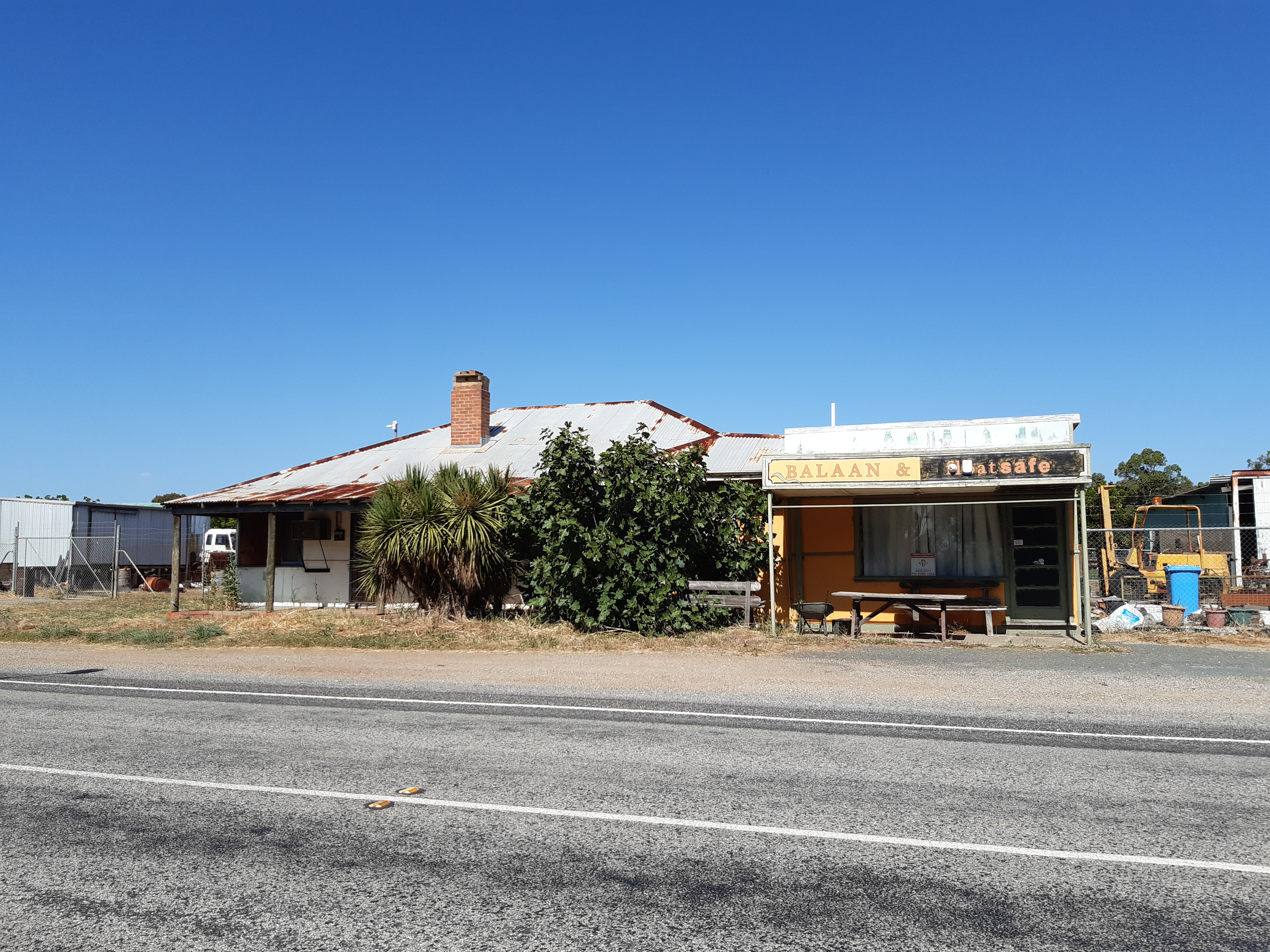
- The former General Store at Mardella
- Coordinates: 32.32036°S 115.95101°E
- Population: 446 (SAL 2021)
- Established: 1997
- Postcode(s): 6125
- Area: 64.4 km^{2} (24.9 sq mi)
- Location: 41 km (25 mi) from Perth; 20 km (12 mi) from Armadale; 20 km (12 mi) from Rockingham; 32 km (20 mi) from Mandurah
- LGA(s): Shire of Serpentine-Jarrahdale
- State electorate(s): Darling Range
- Federal division(s): Canning
Suburbs around Mardella:
Oldbury	Oldbury/ Mundijong	Mundijong/ Jarrahdale
Baldivis	Mardella	Jarrahdale
Baldivis	Hopeland/ Serpentine	Serpentine

Mardella is an outer suburb of Perth, Western Australia, lying approximately 41 kilometres (25 mi) south-southeast of the central business district. It is located within the Shire of Serpentine-Jarrahdale, and at the 2011 census had a population of 303 people. Although falling within the Perth metropolitan area, Mardella is mostly rural in nature, with a significant proportion of the population engaged in farming.

== History ==
Mardella is named after the Mardella Farm, which was established in the first few decades of European settlement. The names of both Mardella and the nearby Medulla Brook are derived from the same Aboriginal root word. Mardella has been used as a locality name since at least 1898, when a railway siding on the South Western Railway was opened under that name. However, it was only formally gazetted as a suburb in 1997. A community organisation erected a district hall in the 1950s, and at one stage Mardella supported a general store.

== Geography ==
The Serpentine River flows through Mardella, forming parts of its western and southern boundaries. The suburb also contains Medulla Brook, a small ephemeral stream. The western portion of Mardella contains a significant amount of uncleared bushland, as well as a small pine plantation. The rest of the suburb is mostly farmland. Mardella's eastern boundary is the South Western Highway, which links Perth with the South West. Part of its northern boundary is the route of a proposed extension to Tonkin Highway.

The Lowlands Nature Reserve, situated along the Serpentine River in the west of Mardella, was declared in 2014. It is located around the heritage listed Lowlands Homestead.

== See also ==
- List of Perth suburbs
