= Cohunu Koala Park =

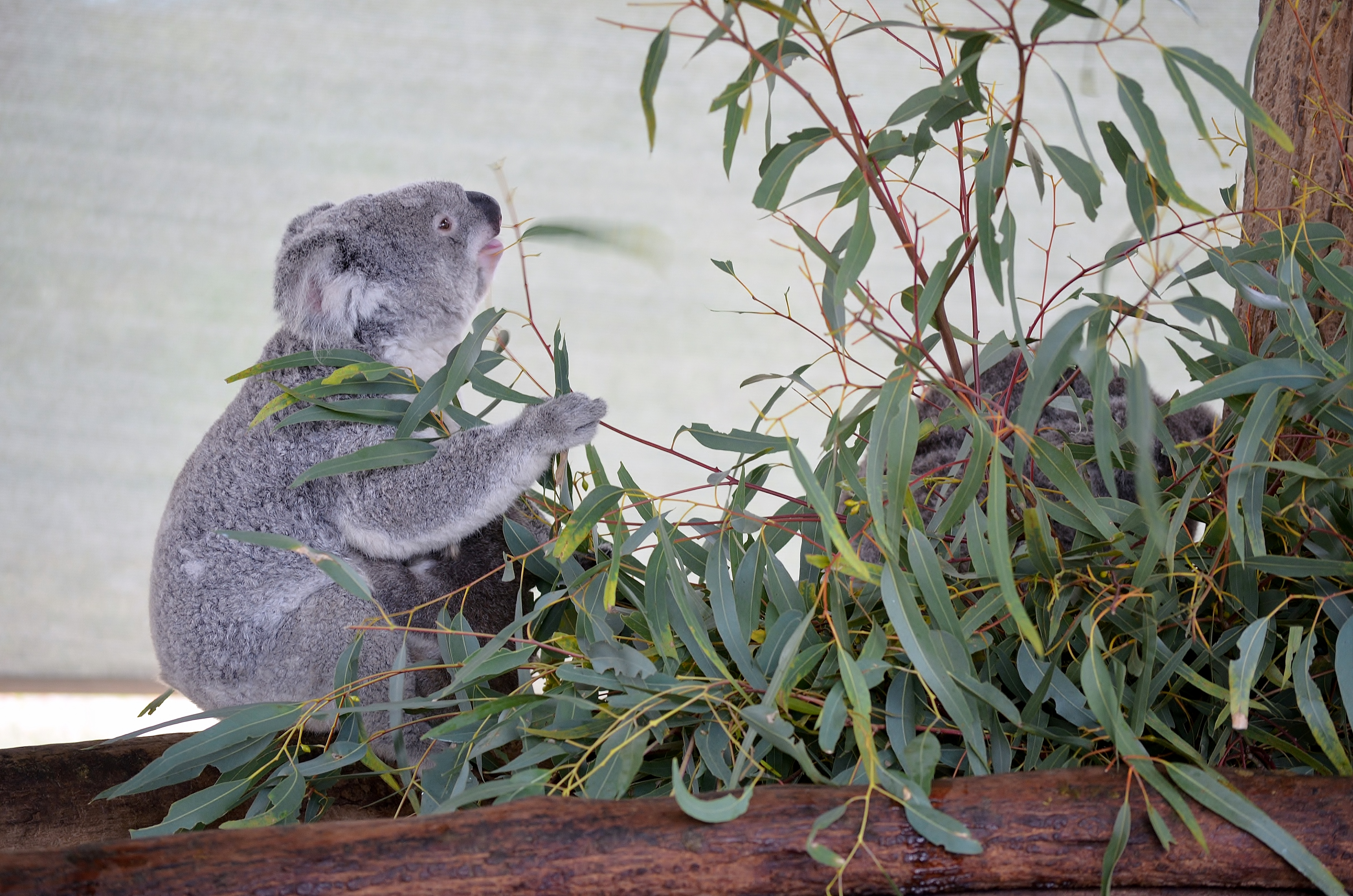
- Cohunu's koala enclosure
- Interactive map of Cohunu Koala Park
- 32.230305°S 116.014151°E
- Date opened: 1975
- Location: Byford, Perth; Western Australia
- Land area: 14 ha (35 acres)
- No. of species: 45
- Website: www.cohunu.com.au

Cohunu Koala Park is a wildlife sanctuary on 14 hectares (35 acres) of bushland at Byford, near Perth, Western Australia.

Its resident koalas are surrounded by neighbouring animals, including wombats, kangaroos, wallabies, quokkas, echidnas, dingoes, pigs, donkeys, ponies, llamas, alpacas, deer, ostriches, emus, owls, cockatoos, water birds, freshwater crocodiles and bobtails. Also found around the park are lifelike replicas of dinosaurs.

Lucille Sorbello and Nardino Sorbello established Cohunu Wildlife Sanctuary beginning in 1972 at 322 Mills Road East, Martin on approximately 16 hectares (40 acres) surrounded by natural bushland in the Darling escarpment near Gosnells and was opened to visitors in mid-1975. The park's koala colony was established in 1982 with the arrival of four koalas from South Australia, and the facility was renamed Cohunu Koala Park in September 1991. In 2009, the park was moved to its current location at 103 Nettleton Road, Byford.

Its koala colony now has over 25 koalas from both the northern koala (phascolarctos cinereus adustus) and the southern koala (phascolarctos cinereus victor) populations.

Between 10 am and 4 pm daily, visitors to the park may be photographed cuddling a koala, at an additional charge. Visitors are also permitted to touch and hand feed various other park animals.

A miniature railway built by volunteers runs around the park. It operates on most weekends and public holidays.

On 24 October 2021, two people broke into the park in the early hours of the morning where they proceeded to abduct a pregnant female guinea pig that was then drowned in the freshwater crocodile pond. The intruders also stole items from the park's utility sheds.
