= Darling Downs, Western Australia =

Suburb of Perth, Western Australia

Darling Downs
- Suburb
- Interactive map of Darling Downs
- Coordinates: 32.182°S 116.012°E
- Country: Australia
- State: Western Australia
- City: Perth
- LGA: Shire of Serpentine-Jarrahdale
- Location: 34 km (21 mi) SSE of the Perth CBD
- Established: 1997

Government
  - State electorate: Darling Range, Oakford
  - Federal division: Canning

Area
  - Total: 9.8 km^{2} (3.8 sq mi)

Population
  - Total: 1,591 (SAL 2021)
- Postcode: 6122
Suburbs around Darling Downs
| Brookdale | Wungong | Wungong |
| Oakford | Darling Downs | Bedfordale |
| Oakford | Byford |

Darling Downs is an outer south-eastern suburb of Perth, Western Australia, within the Shire of Serpentine-Jarrahdale. The name, referring to the suburb's proximity to the Darling Scarp, was first used as an estate name in 1977, and adopted as a suburb name in 1997.

== History ==
Most of the area now known as 'Darling Downs' was historically known as 'Wongong' (later 'Wungong'), but the westernmost portion through which Hopkinson Road passes from the 1930s onwards was regarded as part of the Peel Estate in the Group Settlement Scheme.

== Schools ==
There are no schools in Darling Downs, but the surrounding areas of Armadale, Byford and Forrestdale have numerous schools - both public and private.

== Facilities ==
Since the 1990s, Darling Downs has been in transformation from a rural area mostly comprising hobby farms and a small number of larger land holdings to an outer suburban area of quality housing stock on generous residential lots. As yet there are no commercial facilities in the area. Established community facilities are:

- Rowley Brook Village (an aged persons village).
- Darling Downs Free Reformed Church.

== Transport ==
=== Bus ===
- 246 Armadale Station to Byford Secondary College – serves Masters Road on school day extension trips
- 249 Armadale Station to Hilbert (extension trips to Byford Secondary College via Byford Station) – serves Rowley Road (and Masters Road on school day extension trips)
- 251 Armadale Station to Byford Station – serves South Western Highway
