= Whitby, Western Australia =

Whitby
- Suburb
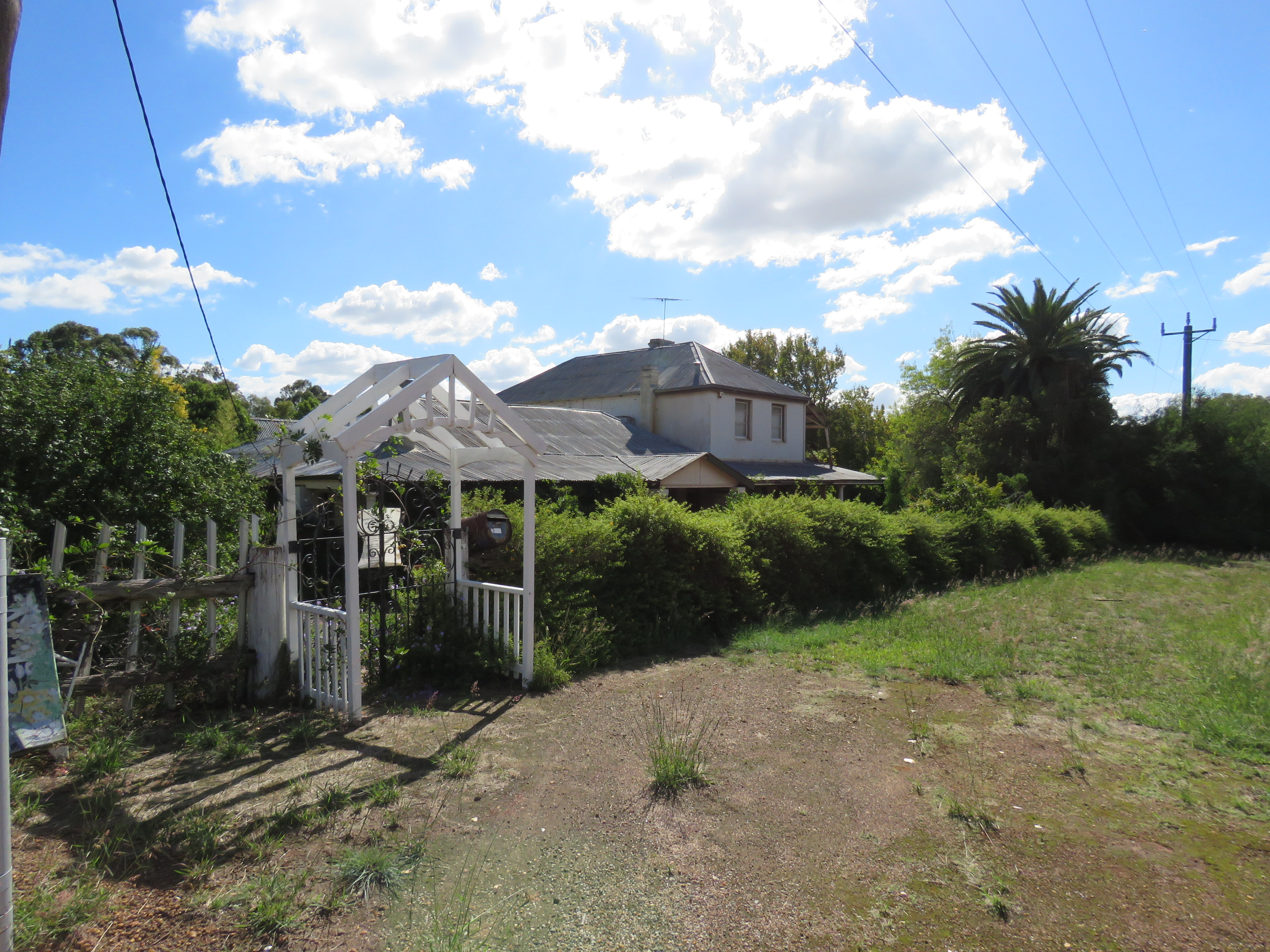
- The heritage listed Whitby Falls Coach House
- Interactive map of Whitby
- Coordinates: 32.290°S 116.013°E
- Country: Australia
- State: Western Australia
- City: Perth
- LGA: Shire of Serpentine-Jarrahdale
- Established: November 1988

Government
  - State electorate: Darling Range
  - Federal division: Canning

Area
  - Total: 16.8 km^{2} (6.5 sq mi)

Population
  - Total: 1,005 (SAL 2021)
- Postcode: 6123
Suburbs around Whitby
Cardup	Cardup	Karrakup
Mundijong	Whitby	Karrakup
Mundijong	Jarrahdale	Karrakup

Whitby is a suburb of Perth, Western Australia, located near the South Western Highway in the Shire of Serpentine-Jarrahdale.

It is named after the nearby Whitby Falls, with the name approved for the locality in November 1988. Whitby Falls had previously been called in Noongar as Mundajill, but was renamed by settler Henry Mead in 1848, who bought property in the area for farming as the Whitby Falls estate. The land was subsequently bought by the government of Western Australia in 1897 and turned into the Whitby Falls Hospital for the mentally-ill. The hospital closed in 2006 as the longest operating facility in Western Australia for the care and treatment of mental illness.

== Transport ==
=== Bus ===
- 259 Mundijong to Byford Station – serves Tinspar Avenue
- 262 Jarrahdale to Byford Station – serves Tinspar Avenue
