= Byford Secondary College =

School in Western Australia

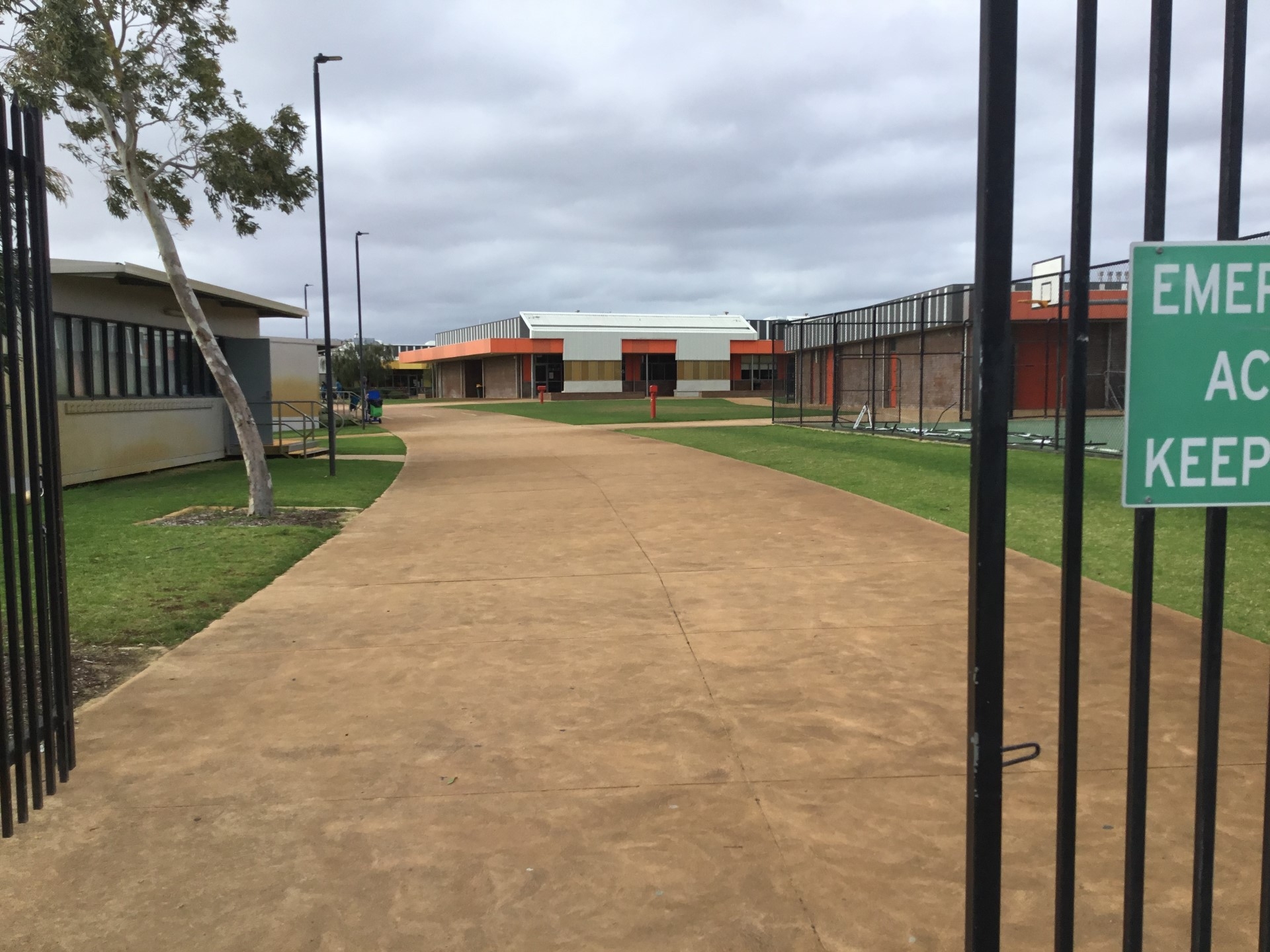
- Mead Street entrance to the school in 2023

Location
- 57 Abernethy Road; Byford, Western Australia; Australia; 32°13′24″S 116°00′09″E

Information
- Type: Independent public co-educational day school
- Motto: Aspire to Excellence
- Opened: 2014; 12 years ago
- Educational authority: WA Department of Education
- Principal: Paul Jones
- Years: 7–12
- Enrolment: 1,488 (2026)
- Campus type: Suburban
- Colour
- Website: www.byfordsc.wa.edu.au

Byford Secondary College is an Independent Public secondary school in Byford, a suburb 33 kilometres (21 mi) south-east of Perth, Western Australia.

== History ==
Stage one of the construction of Byford Secondary College opened in February 2014, and cost $35.2 million. Stage two opened in July 2016, and cost $14 million. Facilities included in that stage are an education support facility, arts centre, gymnasium and extension of the technologies building. The third and final stage opened in September 2017, two years ahead of schedule. The third stage included a double storey senior school building for Year 11 and 12 students, a staffroom, student services area, 3 information technology laboratories, 75-seat lecture theatre, 15 general classrooms and 2 educational support classrooms. The final stage cost $15.9 million.

Byford Secondary College opened to Year 8 students in 2014. An additional year group was added to the school each year after that, up until Year 12 in 2018. In addition, the school opened to Year 7 students in 2015, alongside most other public secondary schools in Western Australia. By 2018, the school had students from Year 7 to Year 12.

In March 2017, it was revealed that the educational support facility's $700,000 pool had not been used in the 9 months since it had been competed. Staff were not trained and accredited for using the pool until October 2016, and by then, the pool's heating system had to be replaced due to corrosion being detected. After it became usable, there were no students with a disability that required hydrotherapy. The principal stated, however, that students with those needs may enrol in the future now that the pool is operational. The president of the State Schools Teachers Union criticised that money was spent on a pool that is barely being used, when other schools find it hard to get good facilities.

In 2018, the school donated school equipment to 43 children in Cambodia.

In the 2021 Budget it was reported the college would receive an additional classroom block including STEM facilities valued at $21.5 million.

Michelle Barret was named the 2021 WA Education Assistant of the Year.

For the 2023 Australian Indigenous Voice referendum, Byford Secondary College served as a polling site on 14 October.

In 2023, teacher Lauren Warschauer was awarded the Commonwealth Bank Teaching Awards in Canberra, being one of only three recipients from Western Australia.

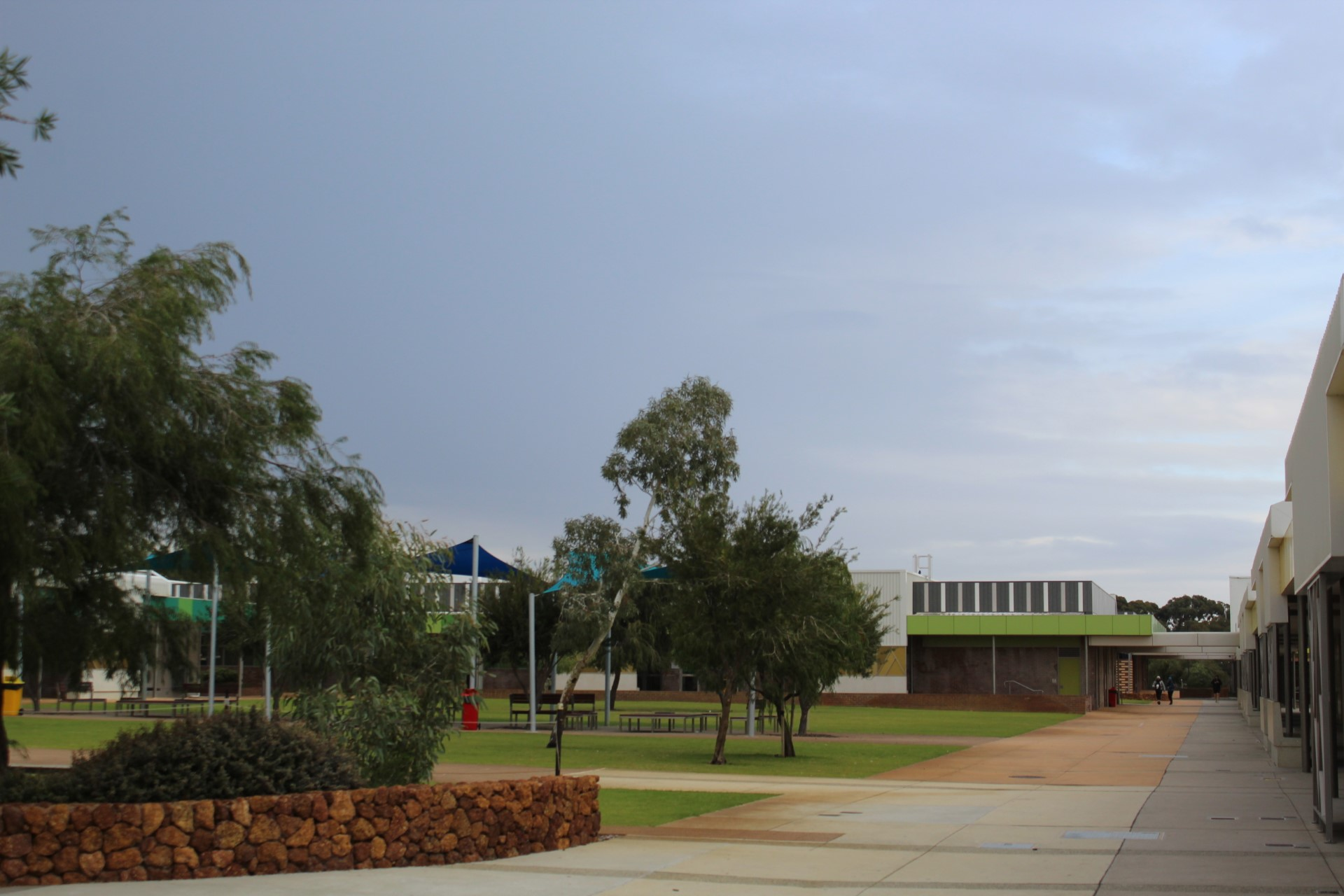
Byford Secondary in 2023 showing C-block, which is mainly for science classes, in the background

== Facilities ==
The school contains eight blocks. A-block is used for Art classes and contains the school's theatre; B-block is the main design and technology block, and also contains home economic classes; C-block is the science block; D-block is the block utilised by students with disabilities; G-block is used by health classes; H-block is used by English classes; I-block is used by mathematic classes; and J-block is used by Humanities and Social Sciences classes, as well as some design and technology classes that are more involved with computers. In addition, the school also contains a library, café, sport change rooms, student services, an indoor gymnasium, sport courts and an oval.

== Academic results ==
2018 was the first year that Year 12 students graduated from Byford Secondary College.

Year	Rank	Median ATAR	Eligible students	Students with ATAR	% Students with ATAR	Ref
2021	—N/a	68.70	174	39	22.41%	
2020	116	68.00	153	33	21.57%	
2019	139	60.00	134	45	33.58%	
2018	130	66.40	109	46	42.20%	

== Student numbers ==
Year	Number
2014	169
2015	594
2016	820
2017	1,027
2018	1,188
2019	1,315
2020	1,444
2021	1,506
2022	1,481
2023	1,458
2024	1,452
2025	1,487
2026	1,488

== See also ==
- List of schools in the Perth metropolitan area
