= Shire of Serpentine-Jarrahdale =

Coordinates: 32°17′02″S 115°58′23″E

- Local government area
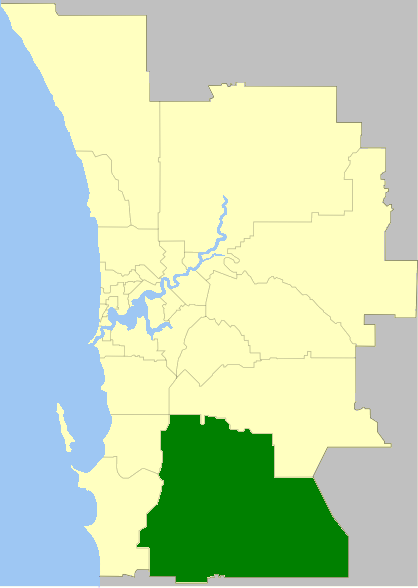
- The Shire of Serpentine-Jarrahdale within the Perth Metropolitan Area

- Interactive map of Shire of Serpentine-Jarrahdale
- Country: Australia
- State: Western Australia
- Region: Peel region
- Established: 1894
- Council seat: Mundijong

Government
  - Shire President: Rob Coales
  - State electorate: Darling Range, Oakford
  - Federal division: Canning

Area
  - Total: 905 km^{2} (349 sq mi)

Population
  - Total: 32,173 (LGA 2021)
- Website: Shire of Serpentine-Jarrahdale
LGAs around Shire of Serpentine-Jarrahdale
Cockburn	Armadale	Armadale
Kwinana; Rockingham	Shire of Serpentine-Jarrahdale	Wandering
Mandurah	Murray	Boddington

The Shire of Serpentine-Jarrahdale is a local government area in the outer southeastern metropolitan area of Perth, the capital of Western Australia, and has an area of 905 square kilometres (349 sq mi) and a population of 32,173 as at the 2021 census. Despite being named after two towns in the area, neither Serpentine nor Jarrahdale function as either the Shire's largest settlement (Byford) or the seat of government (Mundijong).

== History ==
The Serpentine-Jarrahdale Road District was established on 8 August 1913 with the amalgamation of the Serpentine Road District (1894) and Jarrahdale Road District (1902).

On 1 July 1961, it became a Shire following the passage of the Local Government Act 1960, which reformed all remaining road districts into shires. On 17 June 1977, it acquired Byford from Shire of Armadale–Kelmscott.

Following the 2021 Shire of Serpentine-Jarrahdale local government election, councillor for the North Ward, Rob Coales, led calls for an investigation into fraud during the election. The motion was passed unainmously.

== Demographics ==
From the 2021 census, the shire had a population of 32,173, with 2.9% being Indigenous. Compared to the national and state median age of 38, the shire's median was younger at 33.

== Council ==
=== Current composition and elections ===
The last election held in the shire was on 21 October 2023. The election saw previous North ward councillor Rob Coales defeat incumbent Michelle Rich with 2,182 votes (69.8%). Following the election, the council's current composition is shown below:

President	Notes
Rob Coales	Elected as president in 2023
Councillor	Notes
Tricia Duggin	Of the South Ward. Deputy President since 2023.
Reece Jerrett	Of the South Ward
Shaye Mack	Of the North Ward. Elected in 2022.
Rob Coales	Of the North Ward. Also Shire President
Morgan Byas	Of the North West Ward. Elected in 2017.
Nathan Bishop	Of the North West Ward

=== Wards ===
The Shire was previously split into four wards, named Byford, Central, North West and South. Recently, the boundaries were realigned and on 29 July 2011, the gazetted boundaries became:

- North (4 councillors)
- North West (2 councillors)
- Southern (3 councillors)

Elections to fill all positions in these new wards were called for 15 October 2011.

== Suburbs and towns ==
The suburbs, towns and localities of the Shire of Serpentine-Jarrahdale with population and size figures based on the most recent Australian census:

Suburb	Population	Area	Map
Byford	18,878 (SAL 2021)	22 km^{2} (8.5 sq mi)	
Cardup	1,163 (SAL 2021)	19.0 km^{2} (7.3 sq mi)	
Darling Downs	1,591 (SAL 2021)	9.8 km^{2} (3.8 sq mi)	
Hopeland	313 (SAL 2021)	51.4 km^{2} (19.8 sq mi)	
Jarrahdale	1,205 (SAL 2021)	256.4 km^{2} (99.0 sq mi)	
Karrakup	172 (SAL 2021)	78.6 km^{2} (30.3 sq mi)	
Keysbrook	265 (SAL 2021)	180.6 km^{2} (69.7 sq mi)	
Mardella	446 (SAL 2021)	64.4 km^{2} (24.9 sq mi)	
Mundijong	1,246 (SAL 2021)	18.4 km^{2} (7.1 sq mi)	
Oakford	2,803 (SAL 2021)	46.9 km^{2} (18.1 sq mi)	
Oldbury	296 (SAL 2021)	41.1 km^{2} (15.9 sq mi)	
Serpentine	2,863 (SAL 2021)	104.8 km^{2} (40.5 sq mi)	
Whitby	1,005 (SAL 2021)	16.8 km^{2} (6.5 sq mi)	

== Population ==
Historical population

Year	Pop.	±% p.a.
1911	1,454	—
1921	1,181	−2.06%
1933	1,674	+2.95%
1947	1,709	+0.15%
1954	1,833	+1.01%
1961	1,830	−0.02%
1966	1,728	−1.14%
1971	1,981	+2.77%
1976	3,753	+13.63%

Year	Pop.	±% p.a.
1981	5,039	+6.07%
1986	6,470	+5.13%
1991	8,033	+4.42%
1996	9,749	+3.95%
2001	11,062	+2.56%
2006	12,889	+3.10%
2011	17,746	+6.60%
2016	26,873	+8.65%
2021	32,173	+3.67%

- 1911 populations were: Serpentine RD 328; Jarrahdale RD 1,126.
- The 1976 figure above, reported from the 1978 year book and 1981 census, is the figure after the addition of 1,634 residents living in Byford and nearby areas, which occurred in 1977.

== Heritage-listed places ==
As of 2024, 125 places are heritage-listed in the Shire of Serpentine-Jarrahdale, of which five are on the State Register of Heritage Places.
