= Karrakup, Western Australia =

Karrakup
- Suburb
- Nettleton road, surrounded by bush.
- Interactive map of Karrakup
- Coordinates: 32.256°S 116.07°E
- Country: Australia
- State: Western Australia
- City: Perth
- LGA: Shire of Serpentine-Jarrahdale
- Location: 42 km (26 mi) SSE of Perth
- Established: 1997

Government
  - State electorate: Darling Range
  - Federal division: Canning

Area
  - Total: 78.6 km^{2} (30.3 sq mi)

Population
  - Total: 172 (SAL 2021)
- Postcode: 6122
Suburbs around Karrakup
	Bedfordale
Byford	Karrakup
Whitby	Jarrahdale

Karrakup is a locality southeast of Perth, Western Australia, within the Shire of Serpentine-Jarrahdale. The name derives from the Noongar name for the red-tailed black cockatoo and was adopted as a suburb name in 1997.

Karrakup extends east from the town of Byford, along the ridge hill shelf and up over the Darling Scarp. It is bounded by Albany Highway to the east (bounding Jarrahglen), South Western Highway to the west and Jarrahdale Road to the south. Karrakup is nearby the pioneering regions of Cardup and Whitby.

This area has recently been subject to extensive rezoning and development, and community concern exists that this snapshot of Australian cultural history may soon be destroyed. The area contains state forest and tributaries from the Wungong and Serpentine catchments, supplying water to valuable bushland including the Brickwood Reserve.
