= Mundijong, Western Australia =

Mundijong
- Suburb
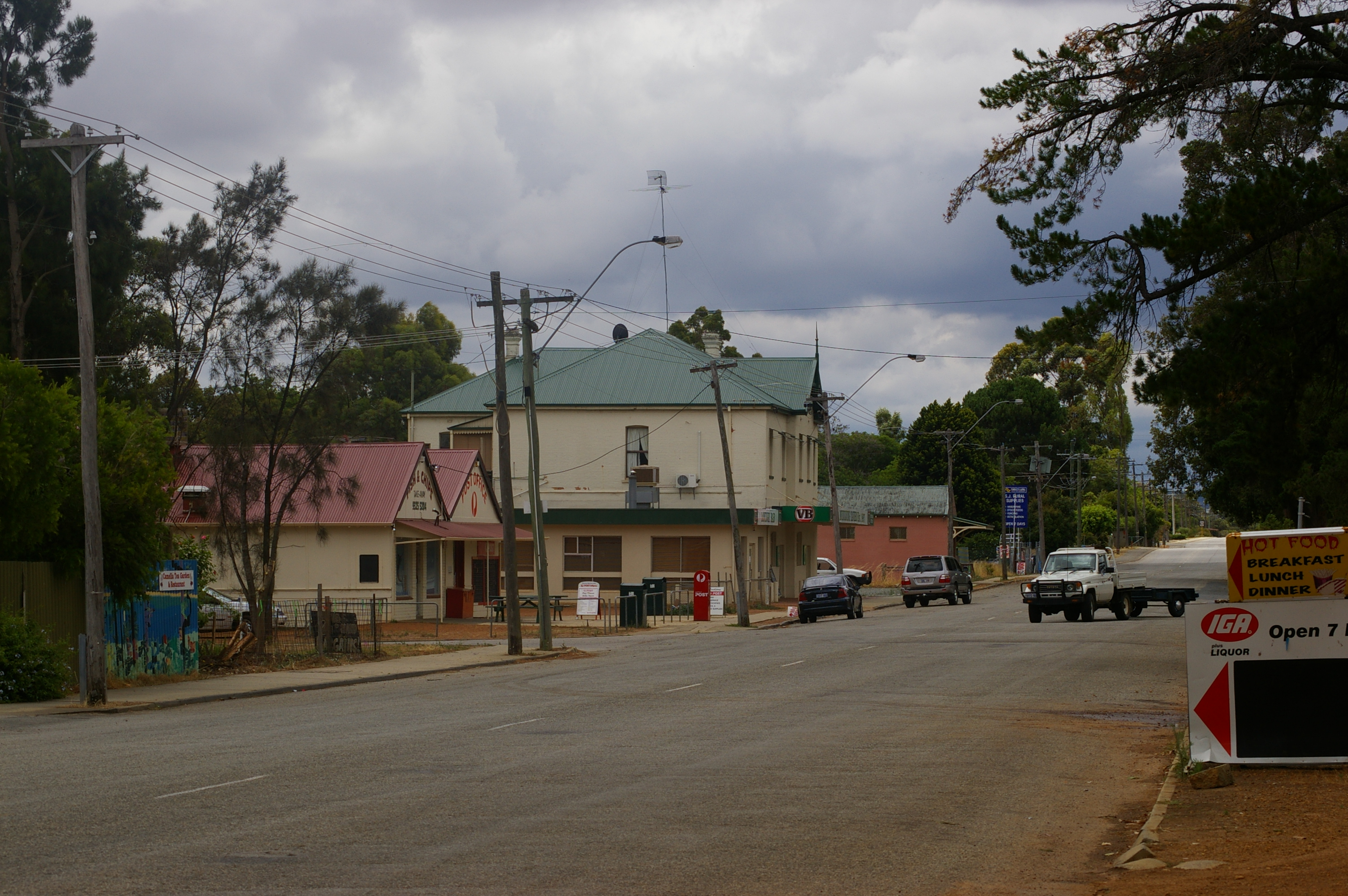
- Paterson Street, Mundijong
- Interactive map of Mundijong
- Coordinates: 32.284°S 115.973°E
- Country: Australia
- State: Western Australia
- City: Perth
- LGA: Shire of Serpentine-Jarrahdale
- Location: 41 km (25 mi) from Perth; 21 km (13 mi) from Armadale; 47 km (29 mi) from Mandurah; 8 km (5.0 mi) from Byford; 43 km (27 mi) from Pinjarra
- Established: 1890s

Government
  - State electorate: Darling Range
  - Federal division: Canning

Area
  - Total: 18.4 km^{2} (7.1 sq mi)

Population
  - Total: 1,246 (SAL 2021)
- Postcode: 6123
Suburbs around Mundijong
Oldbury	Cardup	Cardup
Oldbury	Mundijong	Whitby
Mardella	Mardella	Jarrahdale

Mundijong is an outer suburb of the Western Australian capital city of Perth.

Originally named Jarrahdale Junction, it was at the junction of the Jarrahdale to Rockingham railway line and the government railway line from Perth to Bunbury, which was built in 1893.

At the 2016 census, Mundijong had a population of 1,232.

A town grew up around the junction, and a timber depot, which included a large planing mill, was constructed. The town was first declared as "Manjedal" in 1893 as it was thought to be the Aboriginal name of the area. In 1897 this was found to be incorrect, and the name was changed to Mundijong. It was officially gazetted as a locality on 1 May 1997.

== Transport ==
=== Bus ===
- 259 Mundijong Town Centre to Byford Station – serves Paterson Street, Soldiers Road and Whitby
- 262 Jarrahdale to Byford Station – serves Watkins Road, Paterson Street and Soldiers Road

In Mundijong Buses operate:

- every 15 minutes during peak periods
- every hour off peak and during weekends & all public holidays
