= Byford, Western Australia =

Byford
- Suburb
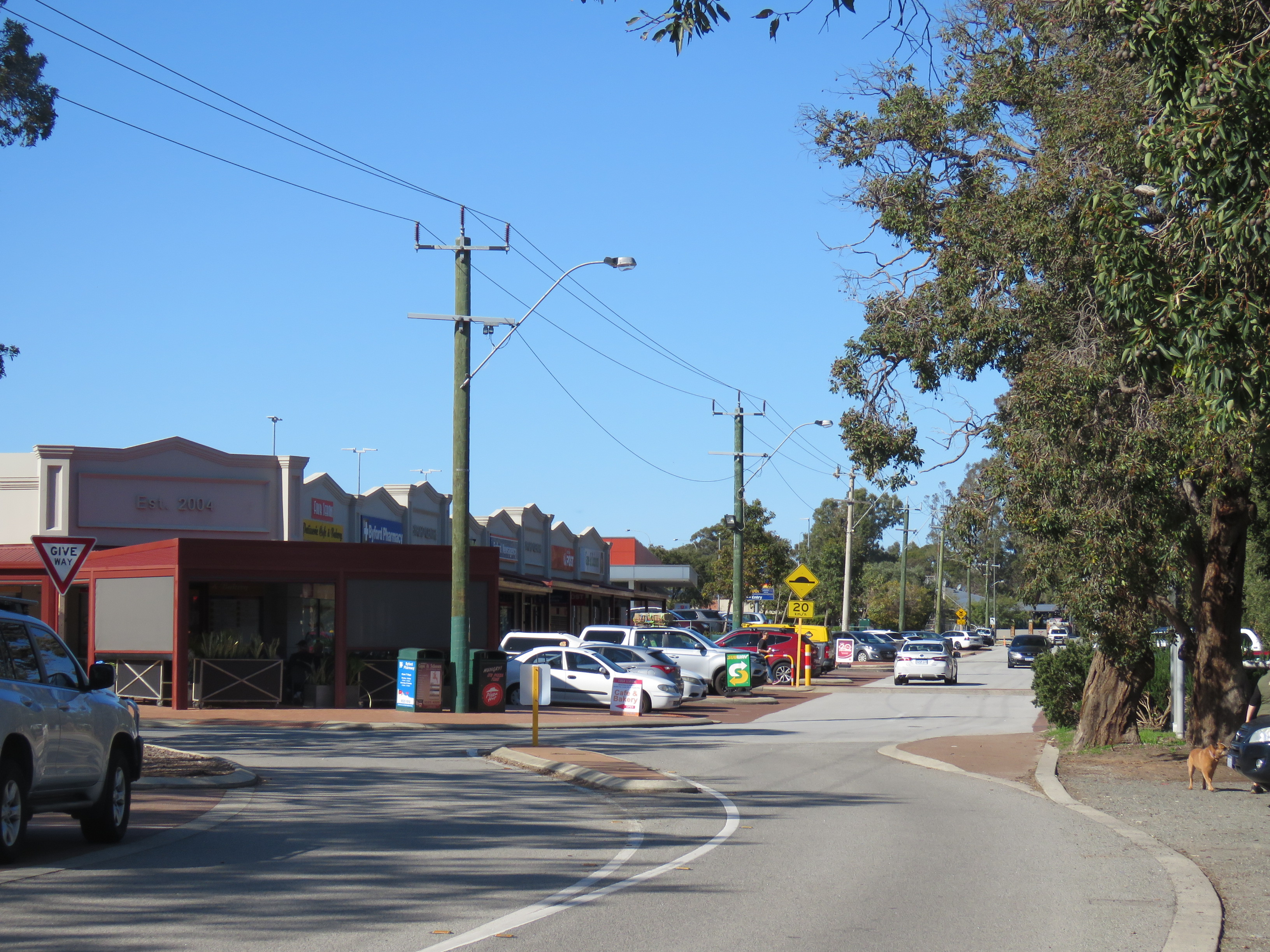
- George Street, Byford, in August 2022
- Interactive map of Byford
- Coordinates: 32.222°S 116.001°E
- Country: Australia
- State: Western Australia
- City: Perth
- LGA: Shire of Serpentine-Jarrahdale
- Location: 38 km (24 mi) SSE of Perth; 8 km (5.0 mi) S of Armadale; 8 km (5.0 mi) NNE of Mundijong

Government
  - State electorate: Darling Range
  - Federal division: Canning

Area
  - Total: 22 km^{2} (8.5 sq mi)

Population
  - Total: 18,878 (SAL 2021)
- Postcode: 6122
Suburbs around Byford
Darling Downs	Wungong	Bedfordale
Oakford	Byford	Karrakup
Cardup	Cardup	Jarrahdale

Byford is a suburb on the south-eastern edge of Perth, Western Australia, within the Shire of Serpentine-Jarrahdale. The town has its origins in a township that was gazetted under the name "Beenup" in 1906. In 1920, the name of the township was changed to Byford.

== Toponym ==
The original name of Byford was 'Beenup'. "Beenup", a corruption of the Aboriginal name associated with nearby Beenyup Brook, was the spelling that had been applied to a railway siding there. The uncorrupted form, "Bienyup" received mention in surveyor Robert Austin's account of an expedition through the area in 1848. On 23 April 1920, the name of the township was changed to Byford. Byford was chosen through a ballot which included other names such as Beenup, Beenyup, Glengeorge and Winterbourne. From 19 to 22 November 2020, the Byford Progress Association held centenary celebrations of the naming.

== History ==
=== Colonial period and early 20th century ===
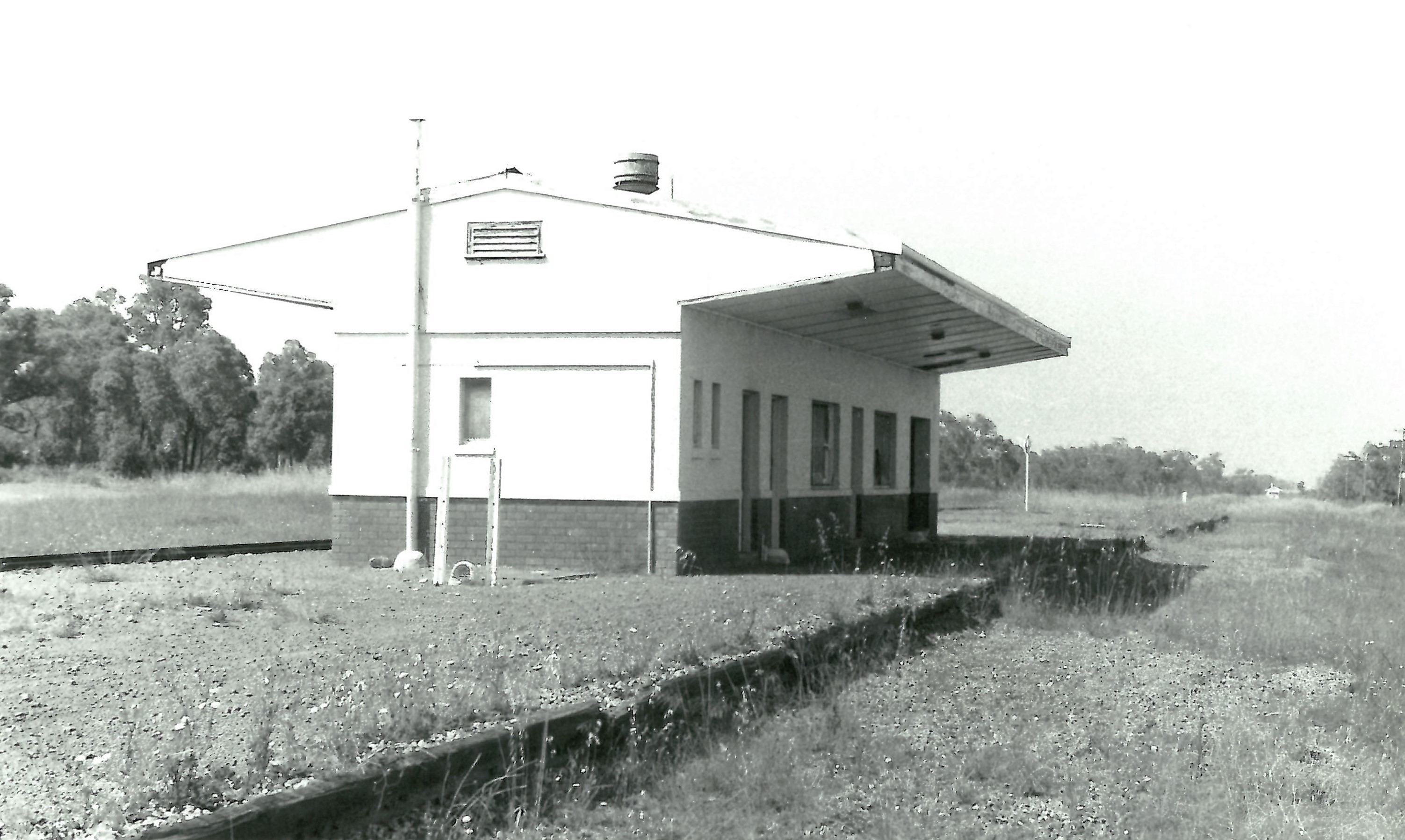
Original Byford railway station in 1987

Little has been documented of the Aboriginal occupation of the Byford area, but material traces of the district's original inhabitants have been found in numerous locations.

During the colonial period, the foothills were on the periphery of Thomas Peel's 1834 land grant, and during the 1840s European settlers took up small land holdings around the area at Wungong and Cardup. By the 1890s, the area was settled by a small number of large landowners, with names of early settlers included Lazenby, Mead, and Liddelow. Mead was an enterprising farmer with numerous landholdings in the foothills between the Serpentine River and the Wongong Brook, and at East Rockingham. Majority of early settlers in Byford lived in poor conditions before they obtained building supplies for houses, and often had large families with up to 13 children.

Brickmaking contributed much to the development of Byford. Shale at Cardup had already come to the attention of colonists by the 1850s, but it was not until around the turn of the 20th century that a commercial brickmaking venture commenced at Cardup. In 1903, John Millard (a former manager of the Bunning Bros brickworks in East Perth) established The Cardup Steam Pressed Brick Company. Two years later, he entered into partnership with Atkins and Law, a rising giant in Western Australia's commercial world. With an injection of capital from Atkins and Law, the brickworks grew to become one of the state's leading producers of pressed shale brick.

A second major brickworks was set up at Beenup, north of Cardup, in 1913. This industry was a state government initiative aimed at reducing the cost of worker housing. Like the brickworks operating at Cardup and Armadale, this one exploited the shale deposits of the escarpment to produce high quality pressed brick and used the railway to transport the finished product to customers. The State Brickworks at Byford closed down in 1964, due in part to its operations being eclipsed by a new brickworks in Armadale. The Cardup brickworks closed in 2012, but much of the infrastructure is still extant.

Shortly after the brickworks had been established at Beenup, local land owner Mr C C Blythe (of Blythewood Park Estate) initiated the planning of another townsite on the eastern side of the rail line - a convenient distance from the brickworks and highway. The new townsite, which is now the most established part of Byford, has a distinctive square plan in which are centred two concentric circles, long diagonal roads, and short perpendicular roads. Blythe gave the new settlement a hall. A new name for the township was chosen by residents in 1919 and gazetted the following year. Anglican and Presbyterian churches and a state school were among the first community buildings erected in Byford.

The original 1906 township was located south-west of the intersection of Soldiers Road and Mead Street but it appears that little if any housing was built in that area until much later in the 20th century. However, the 1906 townsite included an allocation of land for recreation which is still used for that purpose today.

Construction of the South Western Railway reached the district in 1892. The railway was used to transport timber and, later in the 1910s, egg and milk from Byford to Perth. Some time later a stop bearing the name Beenup was established in the vicinity of the present day township. In 1957 a station was established on the line between Abernethy Road and Mead Street. After a long period of disuse, this station was demolished around 1990. The current Byford station is located just south of this. Since 2000, it has been served by Transwa's twice daily Australind service from Perth to Bunbury. Byford will become part of the Transperth network when Armadale line services commence in October 2025.

In the 1920s the estate of a local land-owner, Samuel Bateman, was subdivided into smaller farms for the Group Settlement Scheme. The Group Settlement Scheme also brought out 40 families to Byford to establish dairy farms, but majority of the families abandoned the land grants due to the area's poor soil and high water table.

=== Armament depot ===
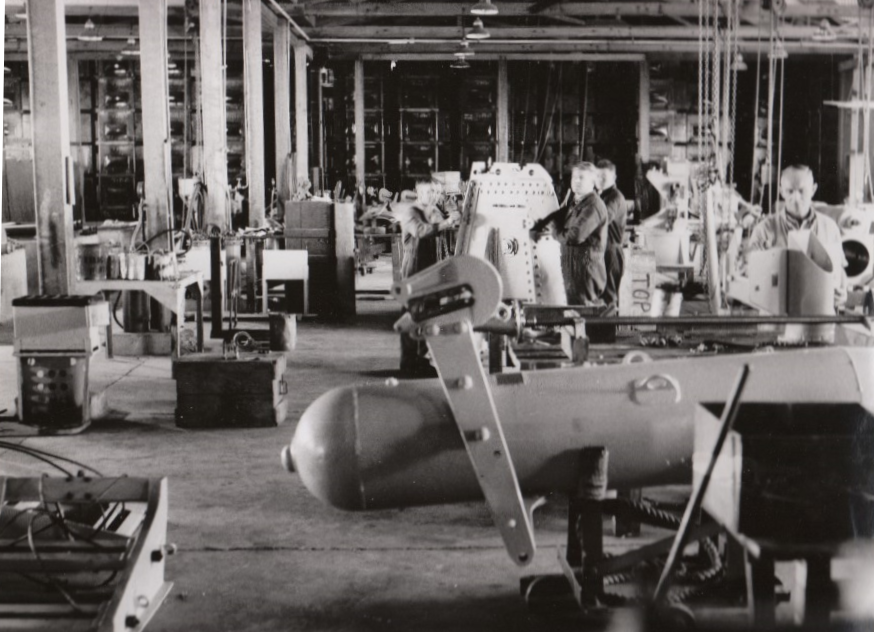
Depot Building 70, circa 1949

Following the Fall of Singapore, a secret armament depot was established in Byford in 1942, due to its rail access and being far enough from the coast to be safe from a seaborne attack by the Japanese. Other sites considered were Cannington and Cardup. In December 1942, the Allied Works Council began storing explosives from Britain. The depot was later expanded to provide for mines and gunnery equipment. Throughout World War II, it supplied armaments to Allied navies except the Americans, and when British submarines began operating in Fremantle in 1944, it was the assembly point of submarine ammunition. At its peak it employed around 250 civilian workers, and by May 1948 it was 141. The depot was disclosed to the public at the end of the war. It costed £250,000 to construct, and had a value of £1,000,000 by 1945.

Its security was provided by the Naval Dockyard Police (NDP), which was the last branch of the Royal Australian Army to be horse-borne. Byford was one of only two depots in Australia to be patrolled by the NDP, the other being Newington, New South Wales. The NDP patrolled the Byford depot up to 1952, when it was transferred to HMAS Leeuwin. The depot was known during the war as "R.A.N. 145", and then as "Naval Armament Depot, Fremantle" up to 1947 when it was renamed Naval Armament Depot, Byford.

In 1981, the depot in Byford was relocated to Garden Island, and in 2005 the remaining buildings were demolished for the housing estate Byford on the Scarp.

=== As part of Serpentine-Jarrahdale ===
In 1977, the local government responsibilities for Byford were transferred from the Shire of Armadale-Kelmscott (now the City of Armadale) to the Shire of Serpentine-Jarrahdale. Recently, Byford has become an extension of the Perth metropolitan area, connected to the Kwinana Freeway by Thomas Road, and has experienced a substantial rise in population.

Historically, Byford's rural land supported sheep, beef and dairy cattle, orchards, and a vineyard (Sunrays, owned by the Vlasich family), but in recent decades there has been an increase in hobby farms geared to equine pursuits, and more recently housing estates with generous lot sizes.

A Free Reformed Church was opened on the corner of Soldiers Road and Mead Street in 1987, and a private school was later built alongside this church.

In the early 2010s, "The Glades" was developed in the town's west and it became the first real estate development in the state to receive certification in the three categories of the UDIA EnviroDevelopment program. The development went on to win three awards, including two national awards. The Glades derives its name from the area's wide green spaces. The estate's precincts of Coral Gardens is named after the abundance of coral trees in it; William's Place is named after William Percival Nairn, who was a farmer in the Cardup-Beenup area and served in World War II; and Icaria after the Greek island of the same name.

In 2017, WBHO Infrastructure in joint venture with Phoenix Solar to construct the Byford Solar Farm. The farm will become the first utility scale solar farm to be located in a metropolitan area in Australia, and the largest solar farm within WA. Upon completion, it will generate around 80,000 MWh annually for the South-West integrated system. It is being developed by WestGen. Originally expected to be operational in 2018, WestGen received a two-year extension in 2022. The project is expected to cost $140 million.

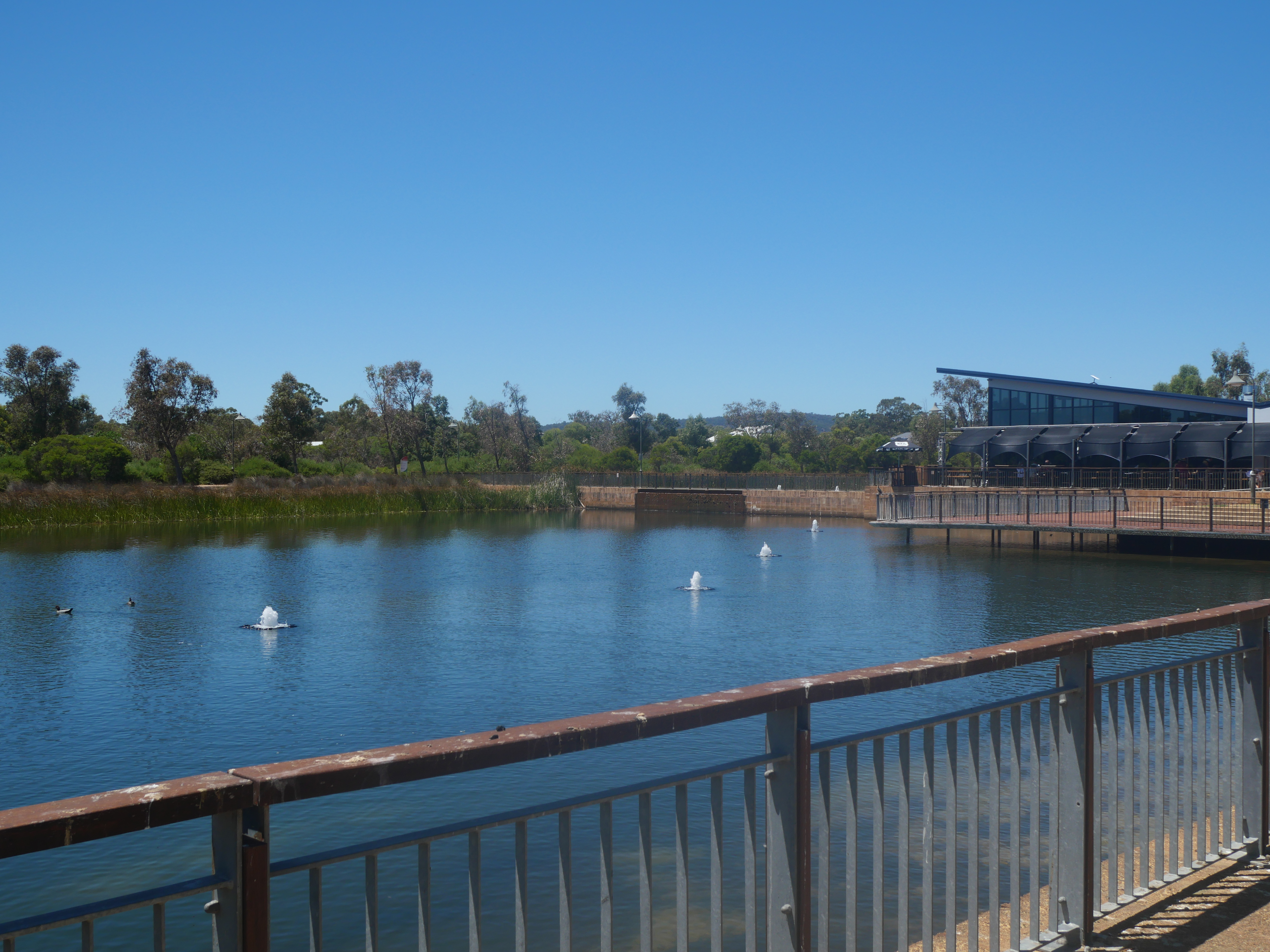
Lake Allambee in 2023

== Cultural and natural sites ==
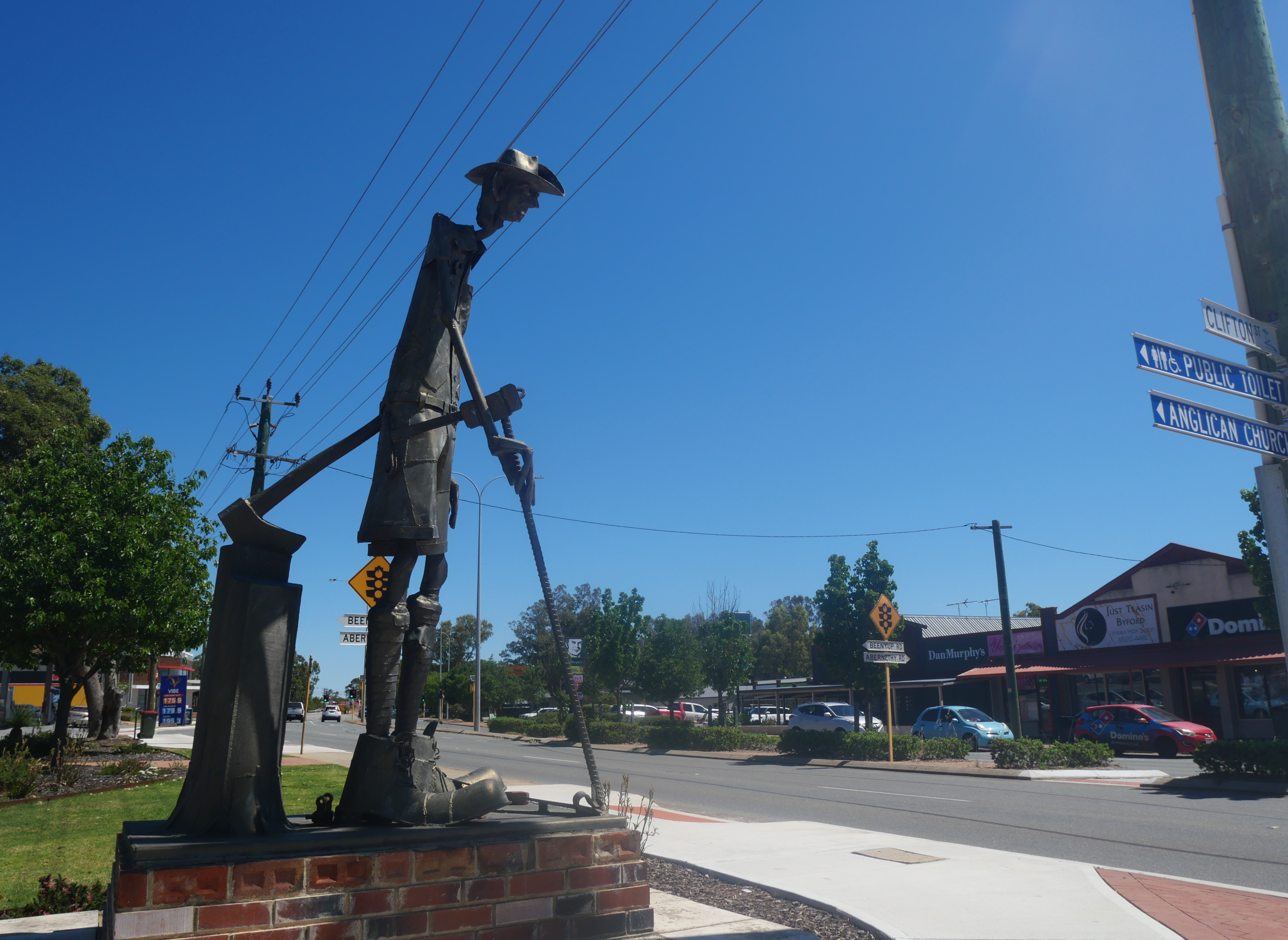
Statue of the Return Serviceman in 2023

Established in 1982, Cohunu Koala Park is a wildlife sanctuary. The sanctuary houses dingoes, koalas, kangaroos, wallabies, emus, deer and owls among others. Byford contains numerous other parks and public ovals.

Lake Allambee is an artificial lake in The Glades. The name 'Lake Allambee' comes from an Aboriginal language in Victoria and means "to sit" or "to remain a while". In 2018, a project was undertaken to eradicate invasive fish species from the lake. On 15 June 2021, rotenone was used to eradicate Pearl cichlid and Mosquitofish from the water.

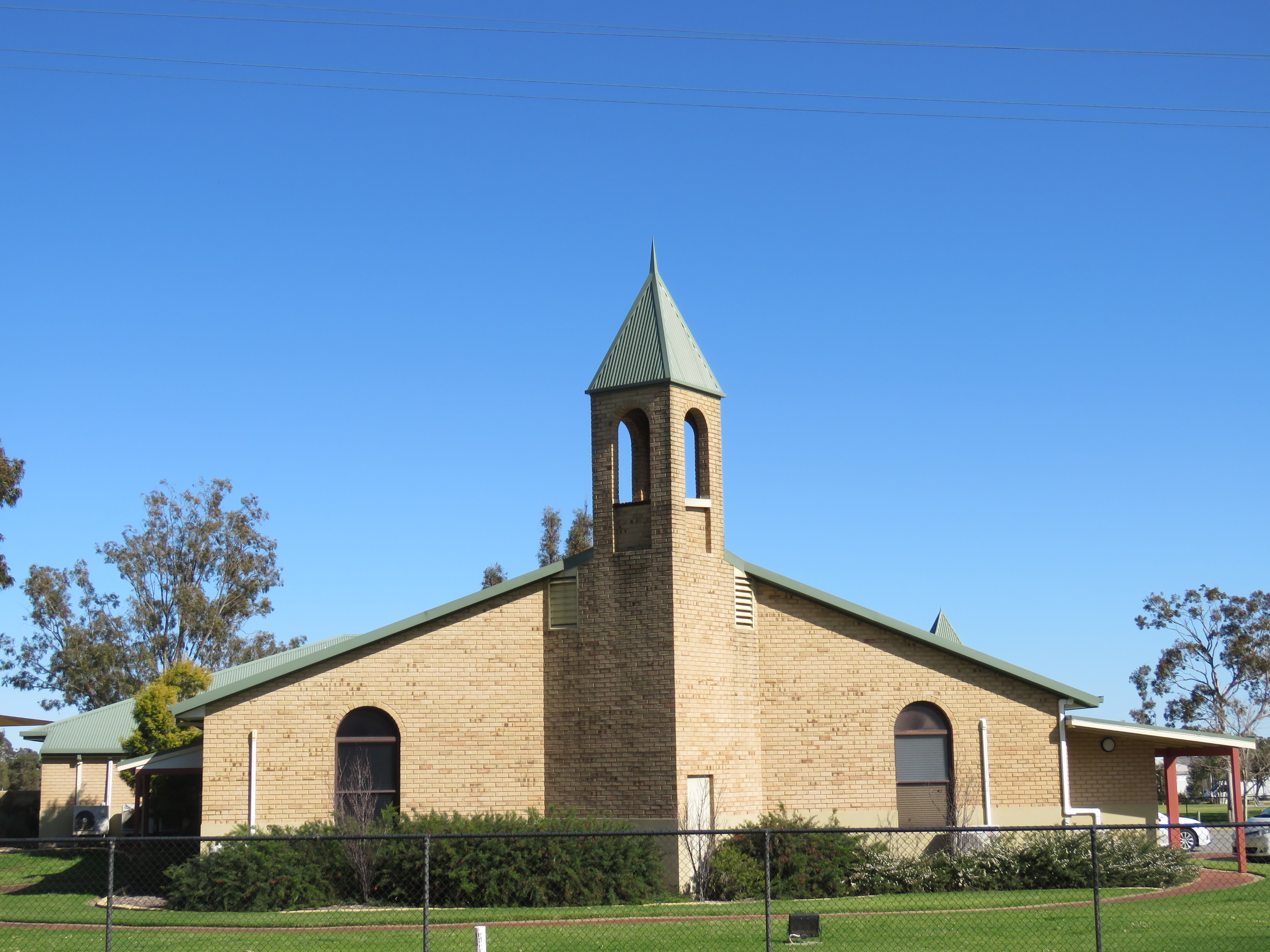
The Free Reformed Church of Byford

Cultural sites include a war memorial to those who fought in World War I and World War II, and the Korean, Malaysian, Borneo and Vietnam Wars. A larger war memorial dedicated to the ANZACs opened on 18 April 2015. The memorial commemorates 321 soldiers from Byford who died. World War I centennial events were held at this memorial on 11 November 2018.

Religious sites in Byford include the Saint Aidan Anglican church, the Free Reformed Church of Byford, Byford Baptist Church, and Centrepoint Church.

Originally a dairy farm, the Byford Trotting Training Complex was established in 1969. The complex was saved from future urbanisation in the late 1990s.

=== Sculptures ===
Byford contains nine sculptures developed by Zen Luks which portray historical and cultural aspects of Byford. Each sculpture is located on the 7 kilometres (4.3 mi) long Byford Sculpture trail along the South Western highway. The four northernmost are at the northern entrance after the intersection between Thomas Road and South Western Highway. The first is the Byford sign, followed by sculptures of a girl with a cow to represent the early dairy industry, a tractor which represents Byford's agricultural industry in the 1930s and a trotter driver to represent the trotting complex that opened in 1969. Subsequent sculptures represent Charlie Knox, a traffic inspector in Byford in the 1940s and 1950s; Sister Wossley who nursed children in the 1940s; a returned serviceman; Rivorse, who ran a dead heat with Eurythmic in the 1919 Perth Cup; two boxing kangaroos; a brickworker who worked at the brickworks in the 1920s; a cockatoo; and a kangaroo at the southern entrance.

== Education ==
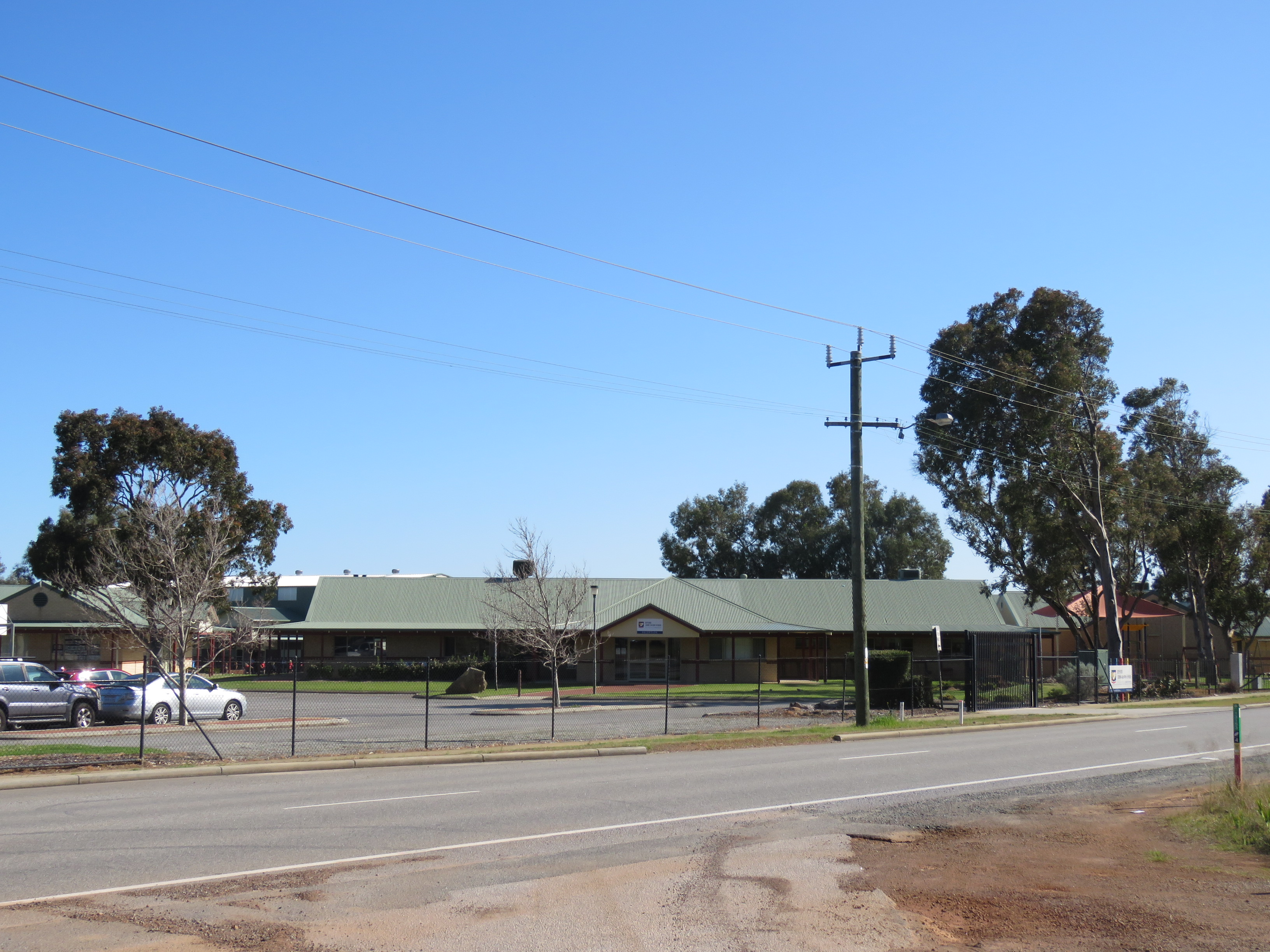
John Calvin School in August, 2022

As a rapidly developing suburb, Byford has seen an increase in education institutions.

Education has been provided to children in the area since 1908 when Estelle Nairn, Byford's first full-time teacher, began teaching at her parents' farm, with about 8 children usually attending. This lasted for 3-years before she died of typhoid. Two more schools operated in the 1910s before Byford Primary School (BPS) was founded in 1921, making it the oldest school in the area. In 2015, it became an independent school. Due to the Kindergarten's closure, an early childhood building was added in 2018. In 2023, former student Damien Oliver returned to BPS before his retirement. The school also teaches Italian.

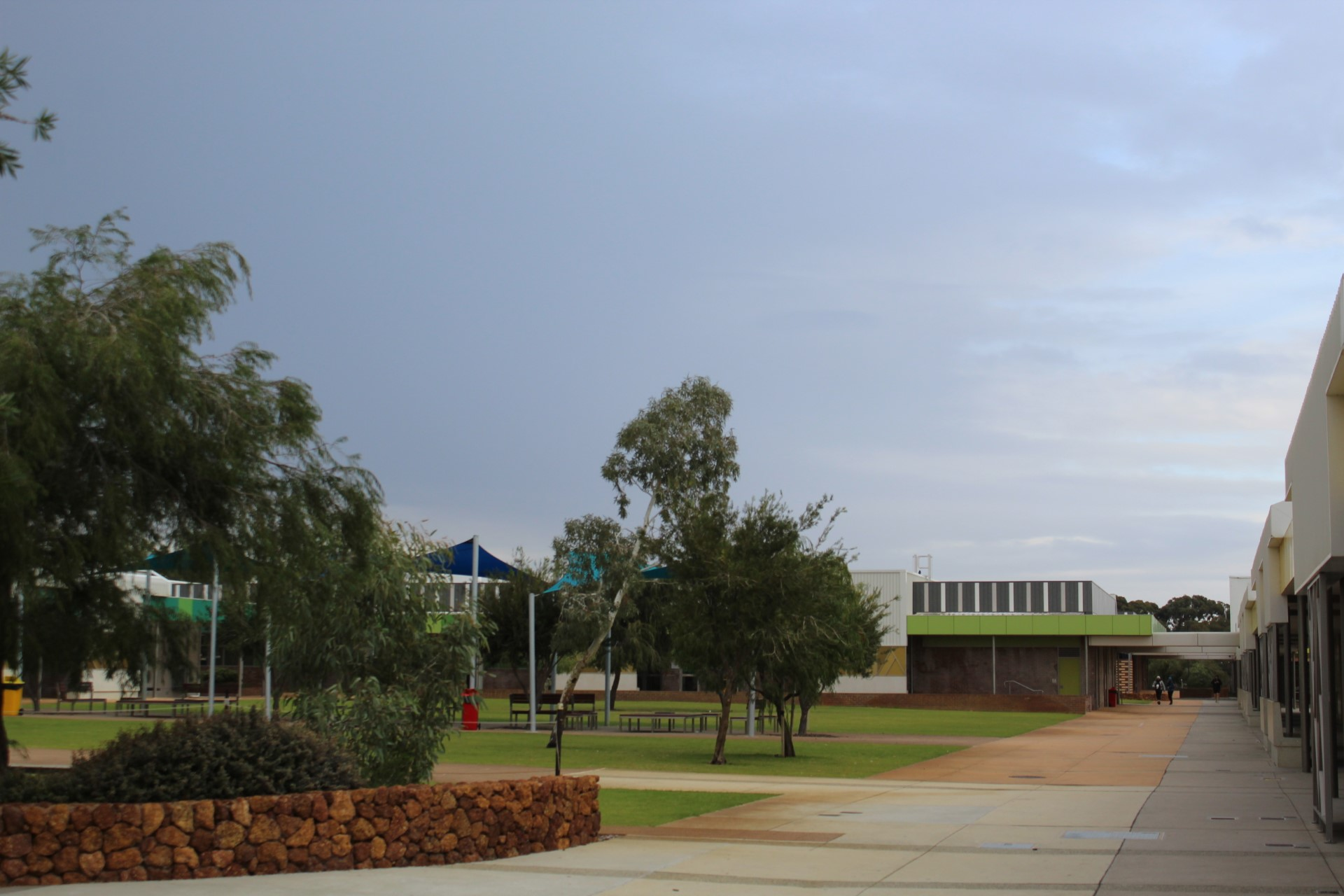
Byford Secondary College in 2022

Opened in 1993 due to overcrowding at BPS, Marri Grove Primary school is a government school that also has an established Indonesian program. Byford John Calvin school was opened on 29 January 1999 next to the Free Reformed Church and is private. On Byford's west, the government school of West Byford Primary opened in February 2013. Salvado Catholic College, a Catholic school for students from Kindergarten to Year 12 was opened in 2016. The college is named after its patron Dom Rosendo Salvado, who inspired the school's motto "Peace, Justice, Compassion". It also teaches Italian. In 2017, Woodland Grove Primary School opened and is a government school. The last school to open was Beenyup Primary School in 2020 as another government school.

Byford and the Shire of Serpentine-Jarrahdale's only secondary-only school is the government Byford Secondary College, which opened in 2014.

The Byford Community Kindergarten was built in 1978. In March 2017, Department of Fire & Emergency Services deemed it high risk to bushfire due to surrounding bushland. It reopened in 2019.

=== Library ===
On 29 March 2021, the council of Serpentine-Jarrahdale decided to move the shire's library services from its library in Mundijong to Byford Hall. Shire President Michelle Rich said that the move was due to the Mundijong library having little capacity to meet future growth, and that a new library in Byford would be closer to the majority of the LGA's population. The project costed $2.65 million.

== Transport ==
=== Road transport ===
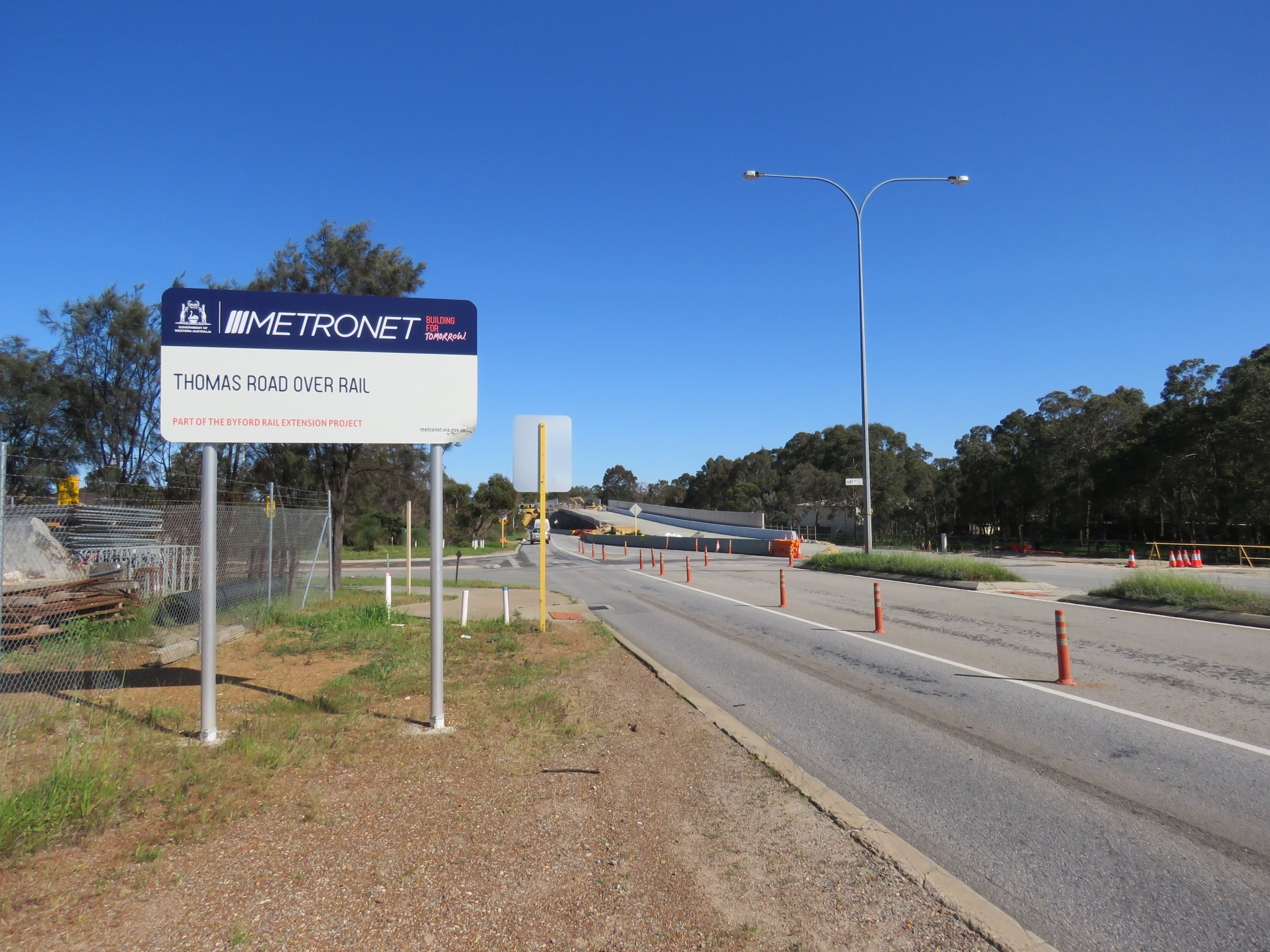
Construction on the Thomas Road bridge in August 2022

Byford is the location of the intersection between South Western Highway and Thomas Road, acting also as the eastern terminus of Thomas Road. As part of the Metronet Byford Rail Extension Project, the section of Thomas Road before the intersection was raised in order to remove the level crossing previously there. The new Thomas Road bridge opened on 15 November 2022. Below are the two major roads that go through Byford and their direction:

- South Western Highway (State Route 20) – south to Pinjarra and Bunbury.
- Thomas Road (State Route 21) - west to Kwinana; eastern terminus in Byford.

Other important roads include Abernethy Road, which connects Oakford to the South Western Highway; Nettleton Road, which connects Byford to Jarrahdale through Karrakup; and Soldiers Road, which connects to Mundijong.

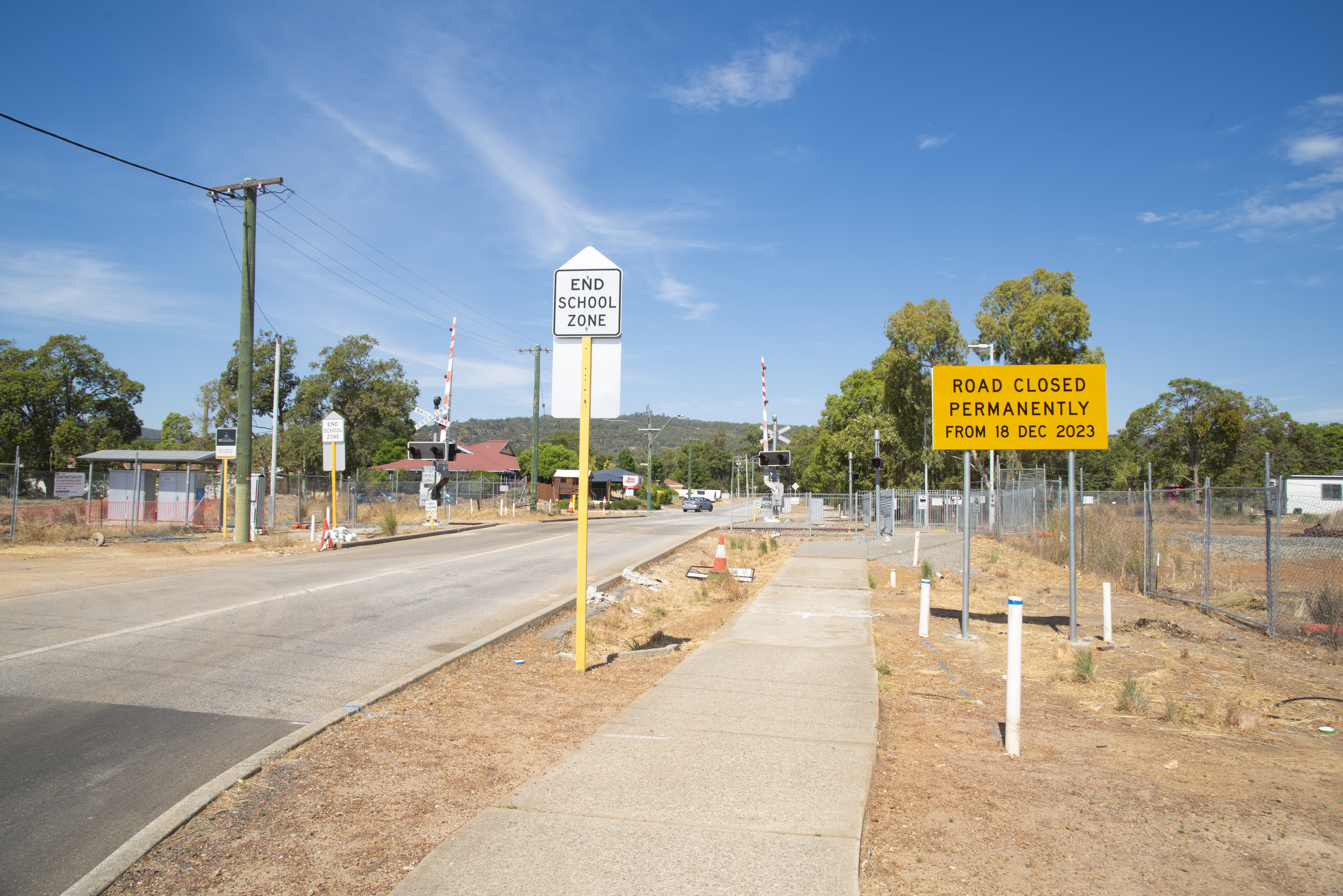
Larsen Road rail level crossing before its closure

On 18 December 2023, the Larsen Road level crossing was closed permanently. The crossing acted as a key crossing in Byford over the railway and is located besides Marri Grove The closure sparked backlash from the public over fears it would increase traffic on Abernathy and Thomas roads, and over why the crossing is not being raised like other crossings in Armadale. To deal with school demand, a temporary drop-off area will be created near Marri Grove in January 2024, while a temporary pedestrian bridge will operate in place of the crossing from January until April 2024 when a permanent pedestrian bridge is built.

=== Public transport ===
As part of the Metronet Byford Rail Extension Project, the Armadale line was extended eight kilometres south from Armadale to a new Byford station. As part of the extension, the line closed on 20 November 2023. The new station will be situated opposite George street and will consist of three platforms serving passengers of the Australind and Armadale lines. Rita Saffioti, the state's Minister of Transport, and Hugh Jones, local Member of the Legislative Assembly, spoke of the station by saying it would boost Byford's future development and growth. It reopened on 13 October 2025.

==== Bus ====
- 246 from Armadale Stn to Byford Secondary Col on School Days Only

Serves Plaistowe Blvd

- 246 from Armadale Stn to Byford Secondary Col on School Days Only Serves Plaistowe Blvd
- 251 from Armadale to Byford Station, Serves South Western Hwy
- 254 Clockwise loop serves Mead St, Kardan Bvd & Ballawarra Av
- 255 Anti-clockwise loop serves Mead St, Kardan Bvd, Ballawarra Av
- 256 Circular - serves Mead St & Kokoda Blvd
- 259 Byford Station to Mundijong Serves Wilaring St & Benalla Cres
- 262 Byford Station to Jarrahdale Serves Wilaring St & Benalla Cres
