= Jarrahdale, Western Australia =

Jarrahdale
- Suburb
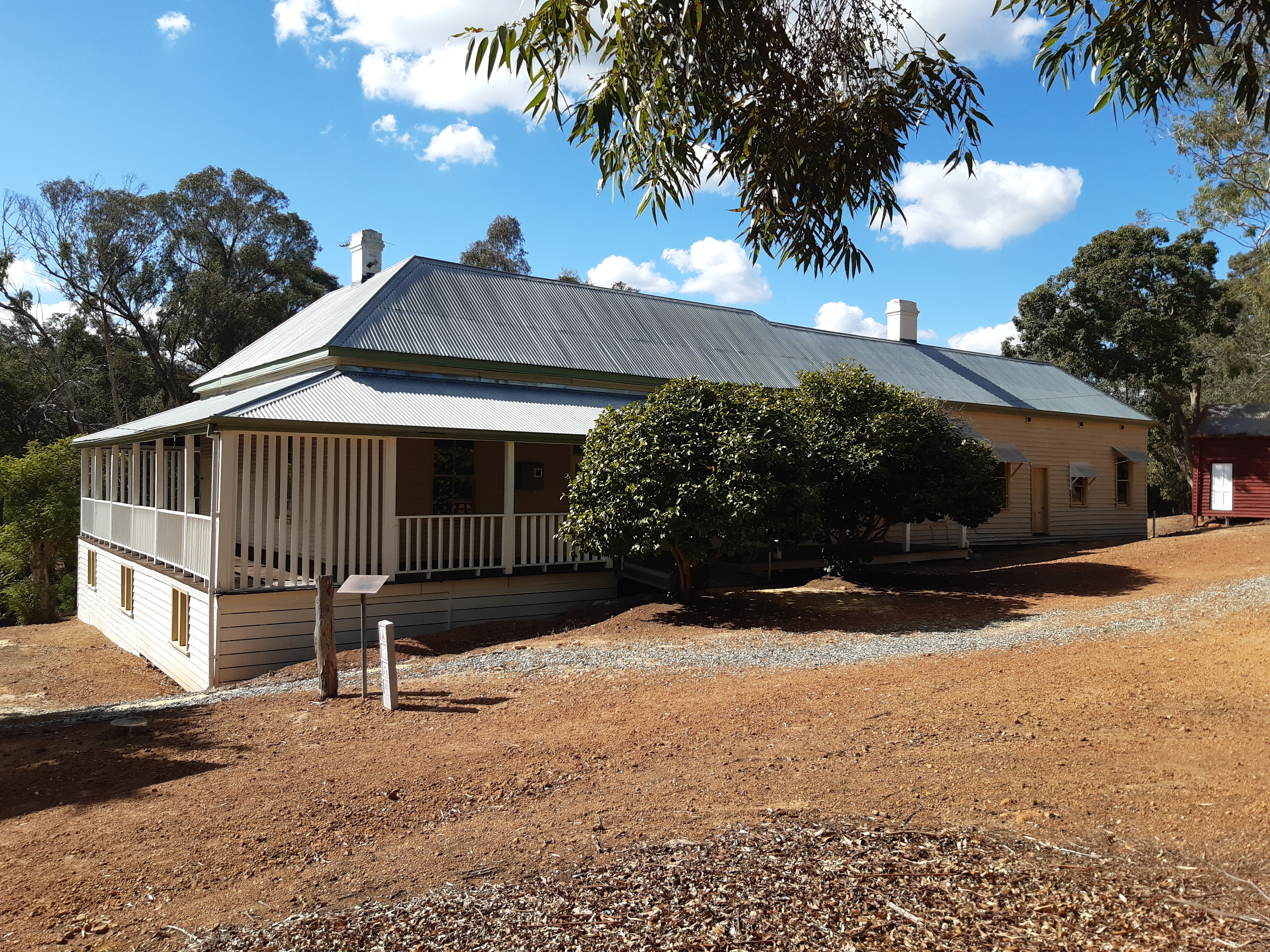
- The heritage listed mill manager's residence in Jarrahdale
- Interactive map of Jarrahdale
- Coordinates: 32.339°S 116.062°E
- Country: Australia
- State: Western Australia
- City: Perth
- LGA: Shire of Serpentine-Jarrahdale

Government
  - State electorate: Darling Range
  - Federal division: Canning

Area
  - Total: 256.4 km^{2} (99.0 sq mi)

Population
  - Total: 1,205 (SAL 2021)
- Postcode: 6124
Suburbs around Jarrahdale
Karrakup	Bedfordale	Wandering
Mundijong	Jarrahdale	Wandering
Serpentine	Keysbrook	Wandering

Jarrahdale is a small historic town located 45 km south-east of Perth, Western Australia in the Darling Range. The name is derived from its situation in a jarrah forest. Established in the late 1800s as the state's first major timber milling operation, it played a key role in the development of Western Australia through the exportation of jarrah around the world. At the 2016 census, Jarrahdale had a population of 1,192. Since 2001, the historic precinct has been managed by the state's National Trust organisation alongside private residential and tourism-oriented developments.

== History ==
=== Establishment ===
When sandalwood was discovered in the area in the 1830s, a trail was established from the King George Sound track (future Albany highway) along Gooralong Brook through modern day Jarrahdale to the Bunbury road (future South Western highway) in order to export sandalwood. From the 1830s to the 1850s, the area north, south and east of Jarrahdale were settled by white settlers. Here they farmed vegetables and sheep, while the wheat grown was turned into flour at Batt's mill established by Joseph Batt.

During the Great Flood in 1862, the South West received torrential rains. In the Gooralong Valley, which Jarrahdale is located in, the region received over four weeks 650mm of rain.

=== Timber industry ===
Although Jarrahdale was of interest to the timber industry, the establishment of such industry in the area was not commercially viable due to the nature of short term timber licences. However, the Governor of Western Australia, Frederick Weld, began granting long term timber licences. This then caused a group of Victorian investors to be granted a large land concession in June 1871, who established the Jarrahdale Station Syndicate.

The syndicate was taken over by the Rockingham Jarrah Timber company in June 1874. The company was formed of working on land granted to William Wanliss, who was one of the Victorian investors. Wanliss would serve in the company as a manager. Headquartered in Melbourne, they exported jarrah to South Africa, Mauritius, New Zealand and South Australia through Rockingham. Formative access to the locality took shape when Jarrahdale Timber Coy, another timbering company, constructed a railway line for the transport of timber from Jarrahdale to Rockingham through Mundijong.

Following the growth of the timber industry, Jarrahdale had by the mid-1870s fifty houses along with a school, material store, workshop and a library. These houses were built on land owned by the Rockingham Jarrah Timber company, and were owned by workers and their families, who were charged with no rent until the early-1900s. By the mid-1880s, the population grew to 400, with 180 being employed in the company. In the community, log chops and dances were organised, while excursions to Rockingham for workers and their families became common, with the first one being on Western Australia day on 2 June 1879. In 1886, the company opened the Murray Arms hotel. Jarrahdale experienced more growth with the discovery of gold, and when jarrah demand increased. In 1890, over 7,000 tons of jarrah was exported from Jarrahdale was used in places like Melbourne, Paris, London and Glasgow.

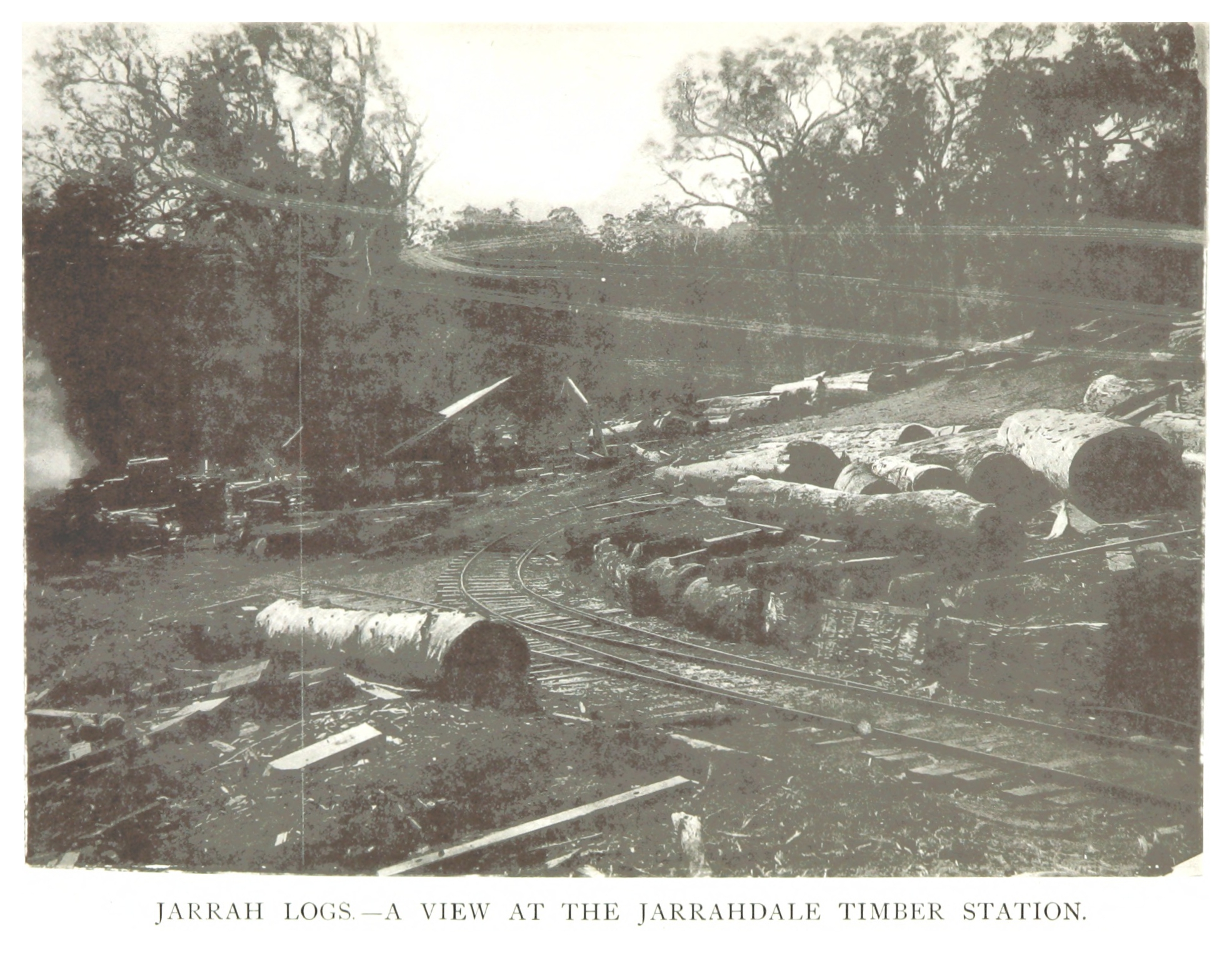
Jarrah logs at the Jarrahdale Timer Station in 1892

The Rockingham Jarrah Timber company was renamed Rockingham Railways and Jarrahdale Forests company. On 8 September 1893, after years of lobbying the government to construct a Bunbury-Perth railway, the railway opened and intersected with the Jarrahdale-Rockingham railway at Mundijong, which was then called Jarrahdale Junction. Following this, three more mills were built. However, the original locality was destroyed by an 1895 bushfire, and the town was then relocated west of its original position to where it currently is. After 1897, the company was renamed Jarrahdale Jarrah Forests and Railways Ltd. By 1898, Jarrahdale had a population of 600 (400 males and 200 females). In 1899, around 300 men were employed by the company. Jarrahdale's growth saw the construction of a Wesleyan Methodist church, school, jail, hospital, public hall. The post office and the St Paul's Anglican Church were built in 1896. The company almost entirely owned every building in Jarrahdale.

=== Early 20th century ===
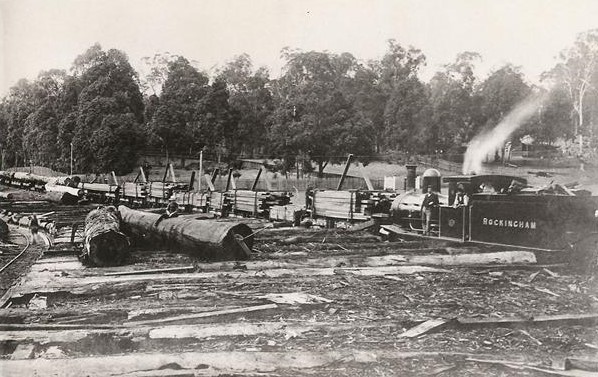
'Rockingham', owned by Jarrahdale Jarrah Forrests and Railways Limited, in 1900

By the 1900s, Jarrahdale had a population of 12,000. However, the early 1900s saw more competition in the timber industry. In 1913, Jarrahdale gazetted. In 1914, a Mechanics Institute was built, which is today called Bruno Gianatti Hall.

With the beginning of the First World War, jarrah was used in the war effort to build ports and harbours. 200 men from Jarrahdale would end up enlisting to fight in the Australian Imperial Force. Out of those 200, 41 died. Private Luke Siford was one of them and enlisted in August 1915 as part of the 28th Australian Infantry Battalion and died during the Battle of the Somme. After the war, a war memorial was erected on 10 February 1923. The memorial was further expanded to include the Second World War. In 2022, the memorial was renovated with funding from Alcoa, MLA Hugh Jones, Shire of Serpentine-Jarrahdale and the Federal government.

Following the war, demand for timber increased outputs from the mills. The end of the war also saw an influx of Italian families to Jarrahdale, with many of them employed as railway gangers. However, the 1920s saw the destruction of No. 2 Mill, closure of the Bush Landing school and Roman Catholic in 1929. When the Great Depression saw the closure of the mills, Jarrahdale saw mass unemployment. Also, December 1929, the Jarrahdale Jarrah Forests and Railways Ltd. concession expired and the company was hit by extra charges by the government. As the Depression progressed, the Millbrook Hotel closed but reopened in 1936 before permanently closing in 1938. As many were left unemployed, many families left Jarrahdale looking for new employment. However, the Depression improved when the No. 2 mill reopened.

During the Second World War, the mill remained opened. In 1943, a Prisoner of War (POW) camp was built southeast of Jarrahdale to house Italian POWs from North Africa. The camp held 220 POWs, who were put to work cutting firewood. By 1946, most of the POWs had been repatriated back to Italy.

=== Late 20th and early 21st century ===
The construction of the Serpentine dam, which opened in 1961, drowned the area of the old No. 5 and 6 mills and the abandoned settlement of Big Brook, which was established as a suburb of Jarrahdale in the late 1800s under Lake Jasper.

Looking at the mid-late 20th Century, Jarrahdale became a resources hotspot once again as Bauxite was being mined by Western Aluminium near Jarrahdale throughout the 1960s. The ore was transported by rail to Kwinana for processing at the company's Alumina refinery. In 1967 the company had mined 405,000 metric tons (398,604 long tons) of bauxite.

On 14 July 1997, the Jarrahdale townsite was entered on the National Trust's List of Classified Heritage places, the seventh Western Australian town to be so classified.

The Shire of Serpentine-Jarrahdale instigated a redevelopment scheme for the Jarrahdale Heritage Park which houses the previous mill sites and the last standing mill built in the 1930s. This mill is still operating as a small production business called Heritage Sawmillers, located on the Gooralong Brook which flows through the townsite. Following negotiations with the landowners Wesfarmers/Sotico, the shire purchased some of the land for housing development and, in 2001, an entire historic precinct was donated to the National Trust of Western Australia, including the site of a closed timber sawmill.

In 2008, the St Paul's Anglican Church was moved to its current location.

== Surviving relics ==
On the main pass road, Jarrahdale Road, are located the successive mill sites and, to the extremity of the town heading east, the last mill site which still contains relics of its existence. This mill was operated by Bunnings until 1997. An Alcoa alumina mining operation was concluded in 1998. Both Bunnings and Alcoa removed most of their plant fittings when they departed.

The surrounding area includes catchments and steep slopes with remnants of the former native forest, e.g., near the Kitty's Gorge walk trail within the Serpentine National Park. In 2009, the Forest Products Commission announced plans for renewed logging in the vicinity, plotting 50-year-old regrowth sites east of the town.

There were once many timber mills in the jarrah forest surrounding Jarrahdale, some of which were flooded when the Serpentine Dam was constructed in 1957–61. Railway formations and cuttings are indicators of past development. "By the 1900s, Jarrahdale had a town population of about 1,200 people while 800 more were housed in surrounding bush landings and remote sites." From 1925 until 1927, a portable school was established in a building mounted on railway trucks, so that it could be easily transported by forestry train from one work camp to another, as timber-cutters and their families moved through the forest.

== Culture and education ==
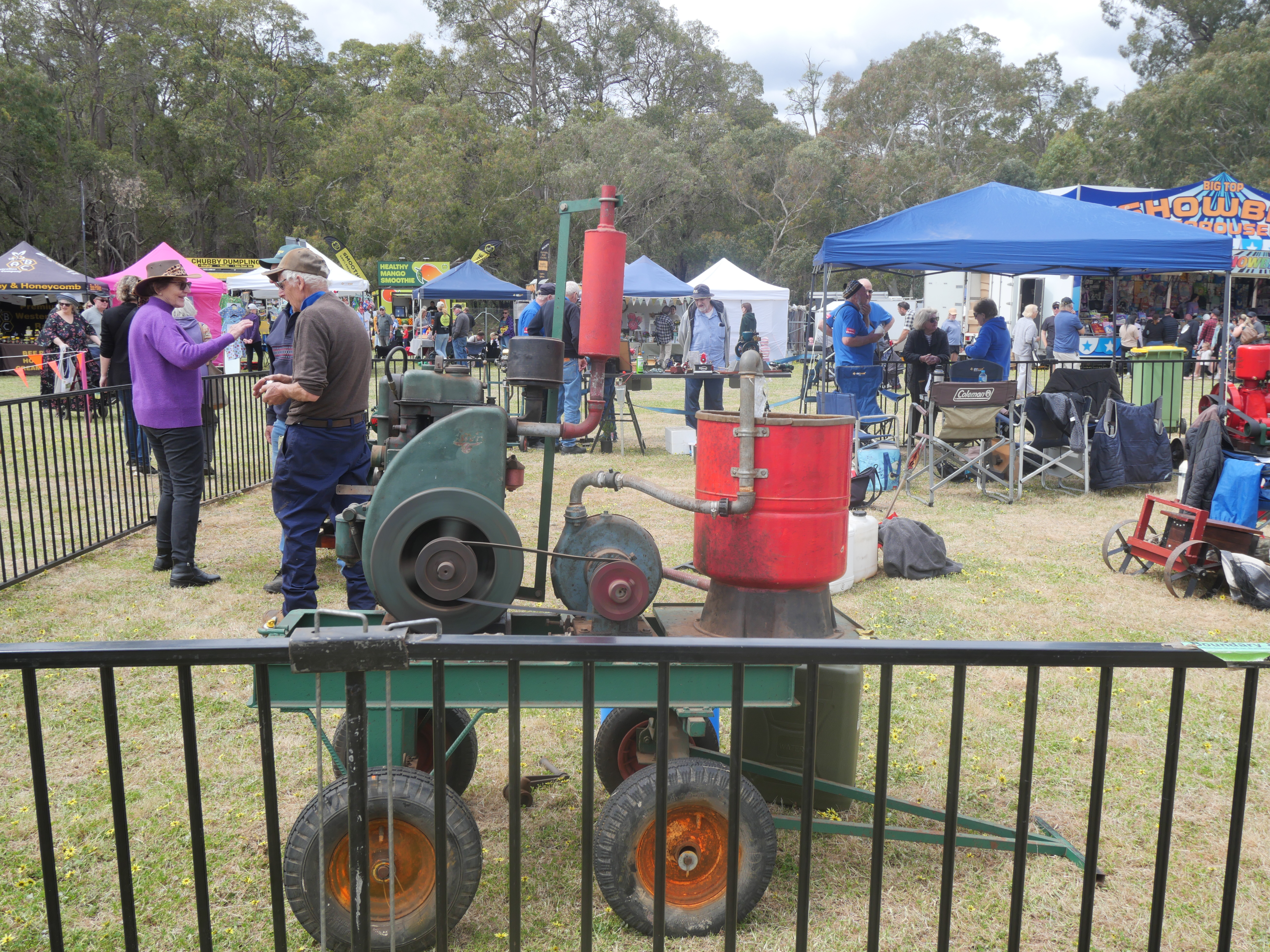
An exhibition at the 2024 Jarrahdale Log Chop

The Serpentine-Jarrahdale Log Chop and the Serpentine-Jarrahdale Lions County Fair, simply called the Jarrahdale Log Chop, is an annual event held at Jarrahdale Oval on the town's outskirts around late September or early October. It is an axeman competition that began in the 1970s, and is run by the Lions Club.

The first school in Jarrahdale was established in 1874. The only school still operating in the town is Jarrahdale Primary School, which was opened in 1954.

== Transport ==
=== Bus ===
- 262 Jarrahdale to Byford Station – serves Kingsbury Drive and Jarrahdale Road

In Jarrahdale Buses Operate: - 5-6 trips each way on school days, with most trips deviating into Chestnuts Estate. - 2 trips each way on school holidays. - 1 Trip both ways on Saturdays - No service on Sunday & Public Holidays

== See also ==
- 3rd Night
- 1961 Western Australian bushfires
- Mundijong, Western Australia
- South Western Highway
