= Electoral results for the district of Jandakot =

Western Australian district election results

This is a list of electoral results for the electoral district of Jandakot in Western Australian state elections.

== Members for Jandakot ==
Jandakot (1989–1996)
Member	Party	Term
Barry MacKinnon	Liberal	1989–1993
Mike Board	Liberal	1993–1996
Jandakot (2008–present)
Joe Francis	Liberal	2008–2017
Yaz Mubarakai	Labor	2017–2025
Stephen Pratt	Labor	2025–present

== Election results ==
=== Elections in the 2020s ===
2025 Western Australian state election: Jandakot
Party	Candidate	Votes	%	±%
Labor	Stephen Pratt	12,006	45.1	−16.0
Liberal	Nicole Robins	9,152	34.3	+8.1
Greens	Ariana Carot Collins	2,891	10.9	+5.2
One Nation	Igor Mironenko	1,139	4.3	+2.9
Christians	Marianne Pretorius	1,087	4.1	+1.7
Shooters, Fishers, Farmers	Alan Brian Strahan	369	1.4	+1.4
Total formal votes		26,644	96.3	−0.7
Informal votes		1,034	3.7	+0.7
Turnout		27,678	90.5	+6.8
Two-party-preferred result
Labor	Stephen Pratt	15,028	56.4	−11.7
Liberal	Nicole Robins	11,608	43.6	+11.7
Labor hold		Swing	−11.7	

2021 Western Australian state election: Jandakot
Party	Candidate	Votes	%	±%
Labor	Yaz Mubarakai	17,950	64.5	+24.1
Liberal	Mihael McCoy	6,460	23.2	−15.2
Greens	Heather Lonsdale	1,347	4.8	−1.9
Christians	Marianne Pretorius	921	3.3	−0.3
One Nation	Dominic Kelly	388	1.4	−5.4
Liberal Democrats	Damon Miles	265	1.0	+1.0
No Mandatory Vaccination	P. Hallifax	262	0.9	+0.9
WAxit	Jagdip Singh	251	0.9	−0.9
Total formal votes		27,844	96.8	+0.7
Informal votes		914	3.2	−0.7
Turnout		28,758	89.5	+5.8
Two-party-preferred result
Labor	Yaz Mubarakai	19,773	71.0	+19.2
Liberal	Mihael McCoy	8,067	29.0	−19.2
Labor hold		Swing	+19.2	

=== Elections in the 2010s ===
2017 Western Australian state election: Jandakot
Party	Candidate	Votes	%	±%
Labor	Yaz Mubarakai	9,973	39.6	+12.6
Liberal	Joe Francis	9,830	39.1	−25.2
Greens	Dorinda Cox	1,735	6.9	−0.2
One Nation	John Murphy	1,681	6.7	+6.7
Christians	Warnar Spyker	901	3.6	+1.9
Animal Justice	Francesca Gobbert	587	2.3	+2.3
Micro Business	Sat Samra	456	1.8	+1.8
Total formal votes		25,163	96.1	+2.0
Informal votes		1,030	3.9	−2.0
Turnout		26,193	90.2	+10.8
Two-party-preferred result
Labor	Yaz Mubarakai	12,835	51.0	+19.4
Liberal	Joe Francis	12,323	49.0	−19.4
Labor gain from Liberal		Swing	+19.4	

2013 Western Australian state election: Jandakot
Party	Candidate	Votes	%	±%
Liberal	Joe Francis	11,998	55.4	+10.9
Labor	Klara Andric	7,834	36.1	–0.9
Greens	John Haynes	1,841	8.5	–3.2
Total formal votes		21,673	94.1	−1.0
Informal votes		1,351	5.9	+1.0
Turnout		23,024	91.6	
Two-party-preferred result
Liberal	Joe Francis	12,584	58.1	+6.2
Labor	Klara Andric	9,085	41.9	–6.2
Liberal hold		Swing	+6.2	

=== Elections in the 2000s ===
2008 Western Australian state election: Jandakot
Party	Candidate	Votes	%	±%
Liberal	Joe Francis	9,176	44.5	+5.8
Labor	Anne Wood	7,630	37.0	−7.2
Greens	Serena Breadmore	2,418	11.7	+4.9
Family First	Damon Fowler	808	3.9	+0.5
Christian Democrats	Bill Heggers	585	2.8	+0.2
Total formal votes		20,617	95.2	+0.4
Informal votes		1,040	4.8	−0.4
Turnout		21,657	89.6	+0.4
Two-party-preferred result
Liberal	Joe Francis	10,680	51.8	+5.5
Labor	Anne Wood	9,920	48.2	−5.5
Liberal gain from Labor		Swing	+5.5	

=== Elections in the 1990s ===
1993 Western Australian state election
Party	Candidate	Votes	%	±%
Liberal	Mike Board	12919	62.51	+2.96
Labor	Dermot Buckley	6262	30.30	−1.86
Democrats	David Banner	1487	7.19	+7.19
Total formal votes		20,668	97.18	+2.96
Informal votes		599	2.82	−2.96
Turnout		21267	95.29	+2.14
Two-party-preferred result
Liberal	Mike Board	13619	65.89	+1.33
Labor	Dermot Buckley	7049	34.11	−1.33
Liberal hold		Swing	+1.33	

=== Elections in the 1980s ===
1989 Western Australian state election
Party	Candidate	Votes	%	±%
Liberal	Barry MacKinnon	10504	59.55	+4.29
Labor	William Lyon	5672	32.16	−10.96
Grey Power	Bryan Cortese	1092	6.20	+6.20
	Timothy Thies	370	2.10	+2.10
Total formal votes		17,639	94.22	−3.89
Informal votes		1,083	5.78	+3.89
Turnout		18722	93.15	−0.19
Two-party-preferred result
Liberal	Barry MacKinnon	11387	64.56	+8.84
Labor	William Lyon	6252	35.44	−8.84
Liberal hold		Swing	+8.84	
