= Spearwood railway station =

Former railway station in Western Australia

Spearwood
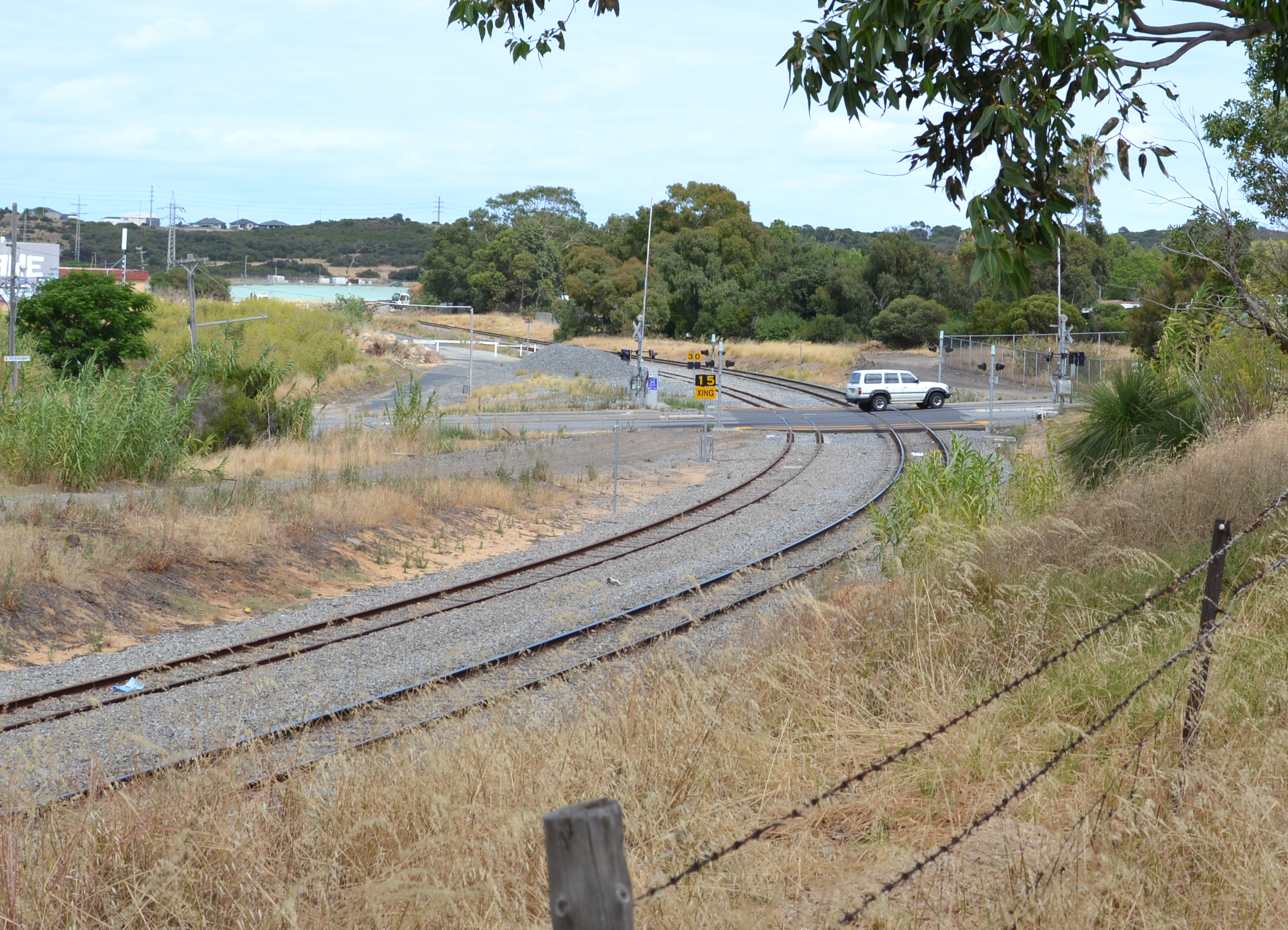
- The station was on the far side of the road crossing in this photo.

General information
- Location: Rockingham Road, Spearwood; Australia
- Coordinates: 32°06′24″S 115°47′09″E
- Operator: Western Australian Government Railways
- Line: Fremantle line
- Distance: 25.5 kilometres from Perth
- Platforms: 1
- Tracks: 1

Construction
- Structure type: Ground

Services
Preceding station	Transperth	Following station
Robbs Jetty towards Perth	Fremantle line	Terminus
Location

Spearwood railway station was a railway station on the Perth rail network. It was located on the Spearwood–Armadale line, 25.5 kilometres (15.8 mi) from Perth station in Spearwood.

== History ==
On 1 April 1906, the Spearwood–Armadale line opened from a junction with the Fremantle line at Robbs Jetty to Jandakot, being extended to connect with the South Western Railway at Armadale on 15 July 1907. In 1909, some of the buildings from Jandakot station were moved to Spearwood station. The station was little more than a raised wooden platform covered with dirt and a couple of wooden sheds. Initially only served by freight trains, a passenger service began in 1913.

Spearwood didn't gain a station platform until after 1923. It was the last station on the line to get a platform.

Passenger services ceased on the line in the 1950s, running after that time for only special occasions such as the Perth Royal Show, for employees of the Watsonia factory.

The Jandakot line was curtailed to become a freight only line to Bibra Lake in the 1960s, with the final section closing in 1991. The section through Spearwood became part of the Fremantle to Forrestfield freight line after alterations to the line were made for the 1987 America's Cup. All that is left of the station are a few wooden posts stuck in the dirt.
