= Robb Jetty Yard =

Railway yard in Australia

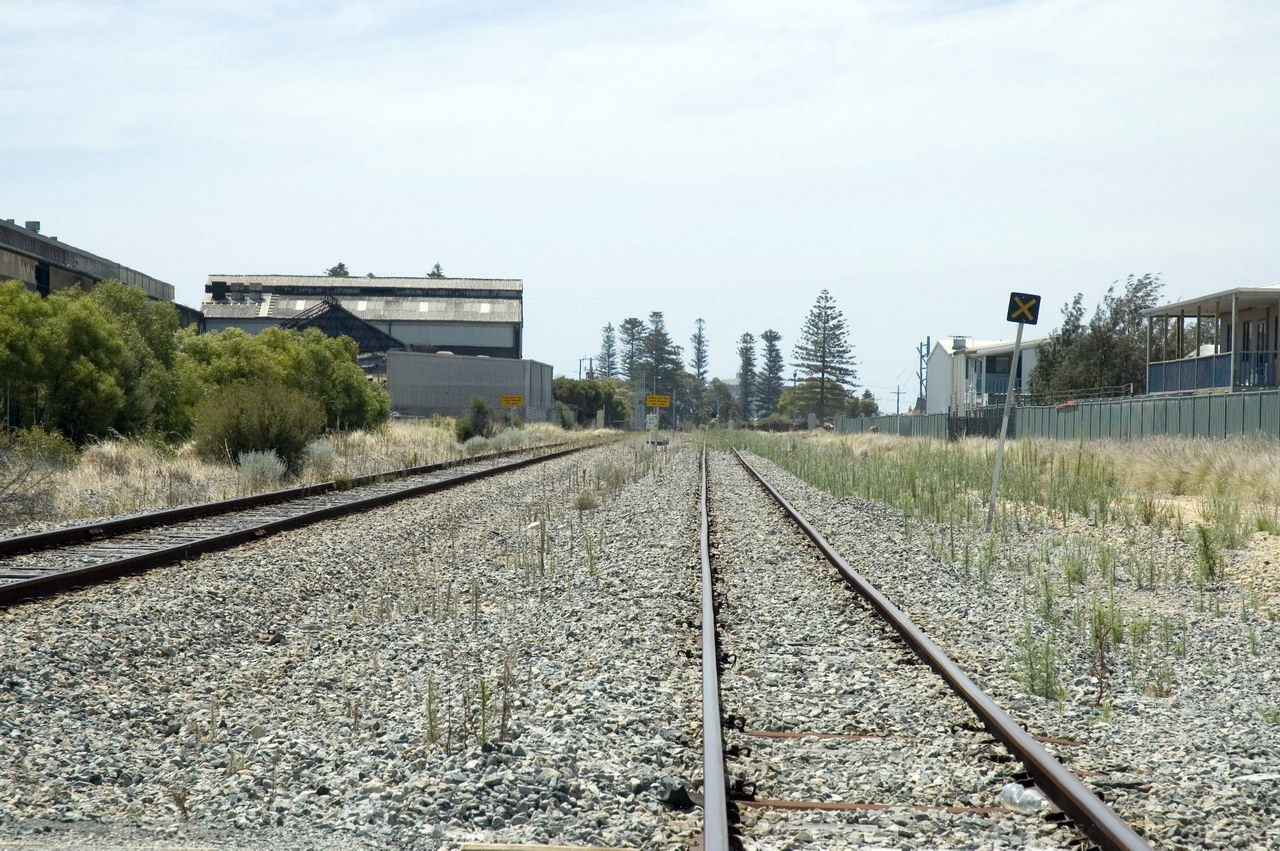
- Site of Robb Jetty Yard in February 2006

Location
- Location: North Coogee, Western Australia

Characteristics
- Owner: Westrail
- Operator: Westrail

History
- Opened: October 1970
- Closed: December 1992

Robb Jetty Yard was a railway yard in North Coogee, Western Australia.

== History ==
Robb Jetty Yard was built as a replacement for the Fremantle Goods Yard. Built on 32 hectares, it had both narrow gauge and standard gauge sidings. The first stage opened on 5 October 1970 with the project completed in March 1972.

In November 1985, Robb Jetty Yard closed to all traffic except wool after the closure of South Fremantle Power Station. In December 1992 the remaining activities were transferred to Forrestfield and Kwinana after the closure of the Robbs Jetty Abattoir with the track lifted in 1996.

== See also ==
- Robbs Jetty railway station
