= Success Harbour railway station =

Former railway station in Western Australia

Success Harbour
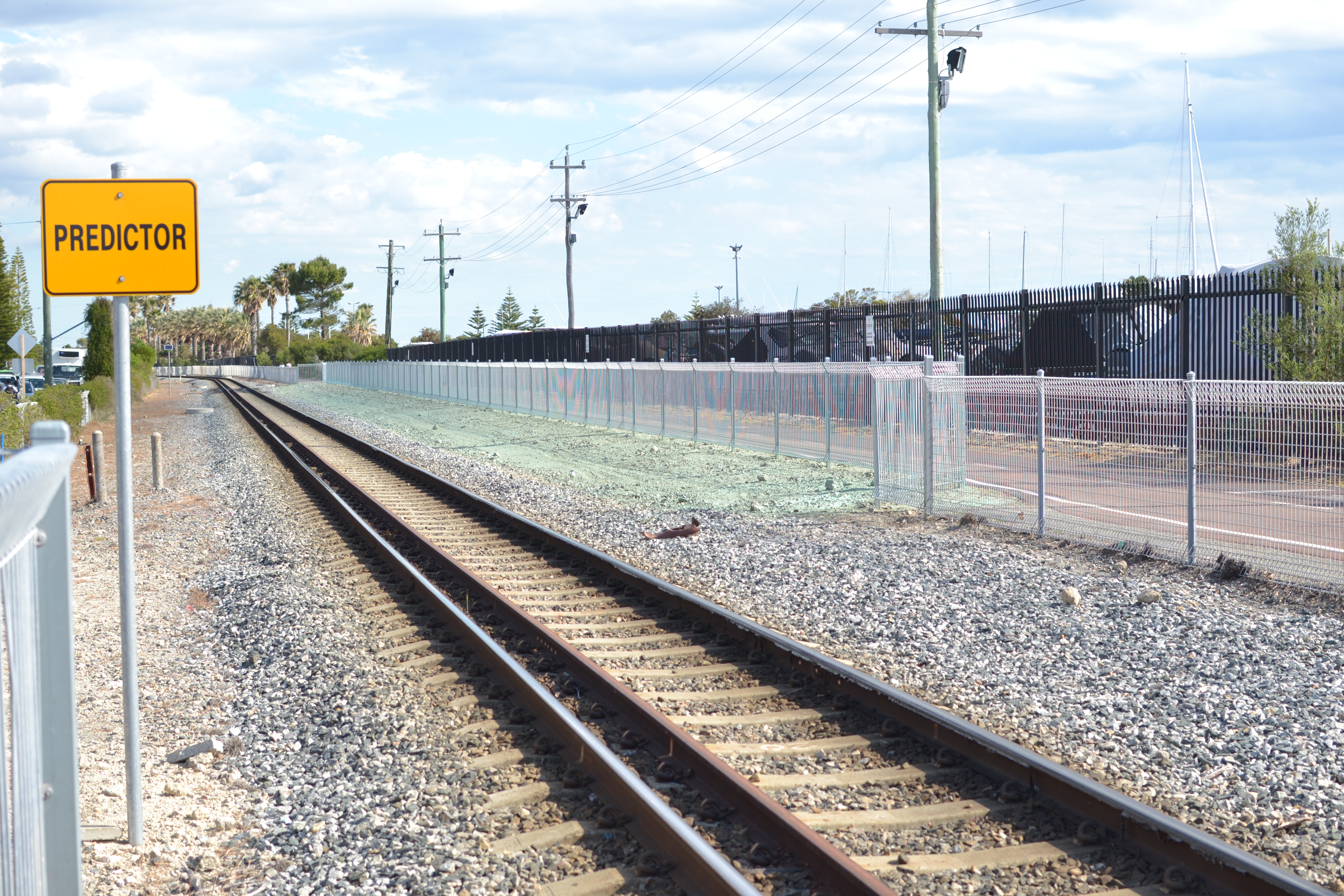
- The location of the station platform, not long after demolition.

General information
- Location: Marine Terrace, South Fremantle; Australia
- Coordinates: 32°04′02″S 115°45′02″E
- Owner: Public Transport Authority
- Operator: Transperth
- Line: Fremantle
- Distance: 20.9 kilometres (13.0 mi) from Perth
- Platforms: 1
- Tracks: 1

Construction
- Structure type: Ground

History
- Opened: 1986
- Closed: 1987

Services
Preceding station	Transperth	Following station
The Esplanade towards Perth	Fremantle line	South Beach Terminus
Location

Success Harbour railway station was a railway station on the Transperth network. It was located on the Fremantle line, 20.9 kilometres from Perth station in South Fremantle.

== History ==
On 22 October 1898, the Fremantle line was extended south from Fremantle to Robbs Jetty.

For the staging of the 1987 America's Cup, the existing narrow and standard gauge tracks were combined as one dual gauge line with three temporary stations erected, one of which was Success Harbour. Between October 1986 and February 1987, the Hotham Valley Railway operated a daily service on this section of the line with a W class steam locomotive as the Spinnaker Run. This was supplemented by Transperth special services. Having not been used since, the station was demolished in September 2018.
