= Spearwood to Armadale railway line =

Former railway line in Perth, Western Australia

Spearwood–Armadale railway line
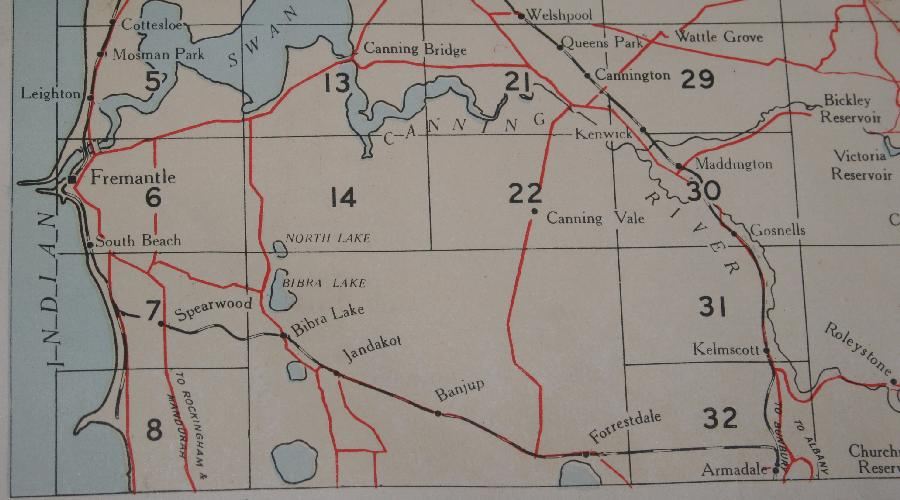
- 1952 street directory showing the Spearwood to Armadale line as well as the Fremantle line to Woodman Point

Overview
- Owner: Western Australian Government Railways
- Termini: Spearwood; Armadale
- Continues from: Fremantle line
- Continues as: South Western Railway

Technical
- Track gauge: 1,067 mm (3 ft 6 in)

The Spearwood–Armadale railway line (also known as the Jandakot or Bibra Lake lines) was a Western Australian Government Railways line connecting Spearwood to Armadale south of Perth.

== History ==
In January 1904, the Jandakot Railway Act 1904 was assented for a 6-mile-40-chain (10.5 km) line from a junction on the Fremantle–Woodman's Point Railway to Jandakot, with the line opening on 1 April 1906. In December 1906, the Jandakot–Armadale Railway Act 1906 was assented for an 11-mile (18 km) extension from Jandakot to Armadale to join the South Western Railway, with the line opening on 15 July 1907.

It was constructed in response to the need to transport agricultural goods in the Armadale and Forrestdale areas to the port of Fremantle. With the construction of a new Kwinana line from Jarrahdale to Kwinana, the Jandakot to Armadale section closed on 23 January 1964, followed by Bibra Lake to Jandakot on 6 June 1966. The Spearwood to Bibra Lake section was retained to serve CBH Group and Elders Limited sidings until it closed in 1991.

=== Stopping places ===
- Spearwood
- Bibra Lake
- Jandakot
- Banjup
- Forrestdale
- Westfield

In the 1980s, the railway corridor between Armadale and Forrestdale was redeveloped as a major arterial road, Armadale Road, joining onto Forrest Road which west of Forrestdale ran parallel to the railway.
