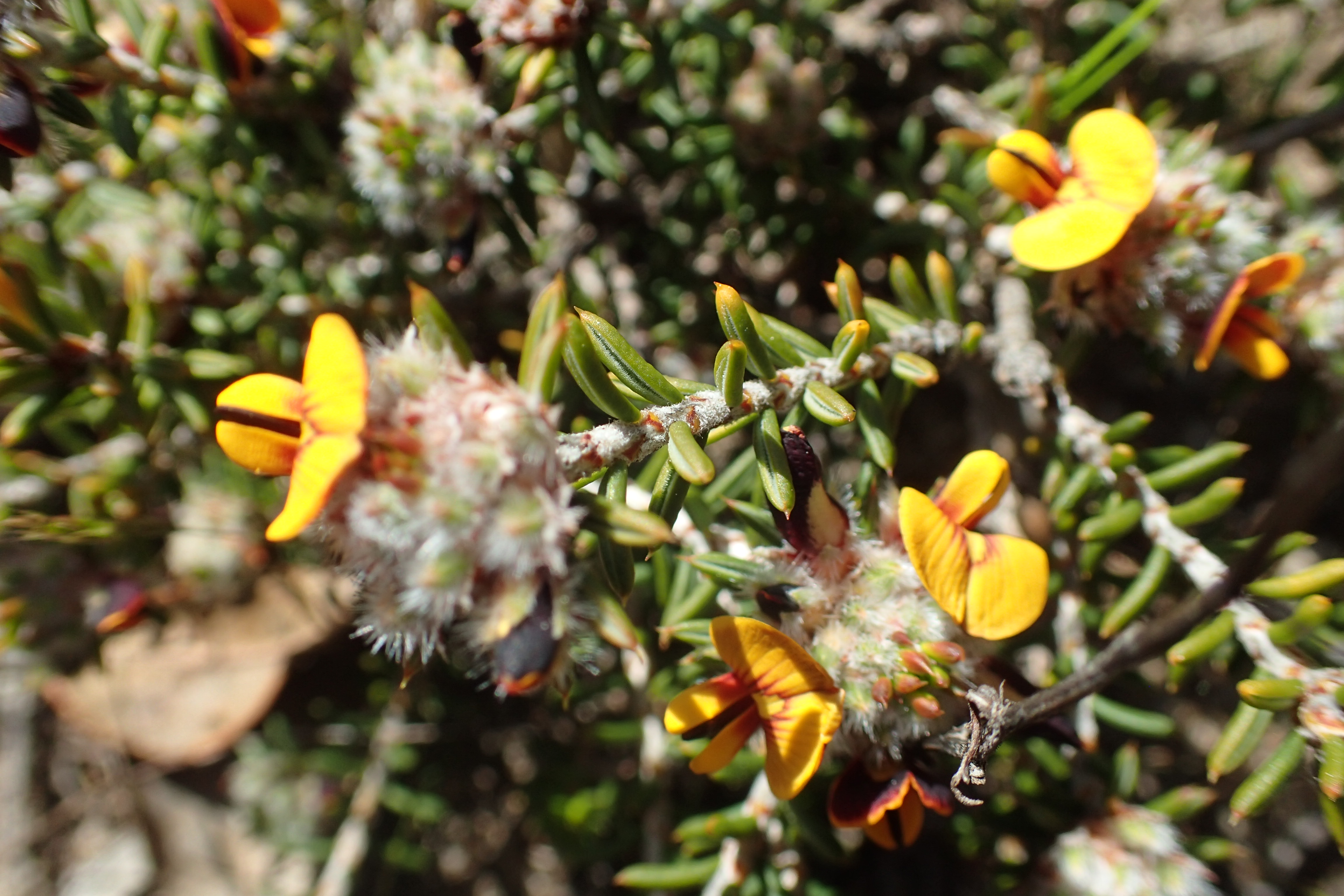

Scientific classification
- Kingdom: Plantae
- Clade: Tracheophytes
- Clade: Angiosperms
- Clade: Eudicots
- Clade: Rosids
- Order: Fabales
- Family: Fabaceae
- Subfamily: Faboideae
- Genus: Pultenaea
- Species: P. barbata

Binomial name
- Pultenaea barbata C.R.P.Andrews

= Pultenaea barbata =

Species of flowering plant

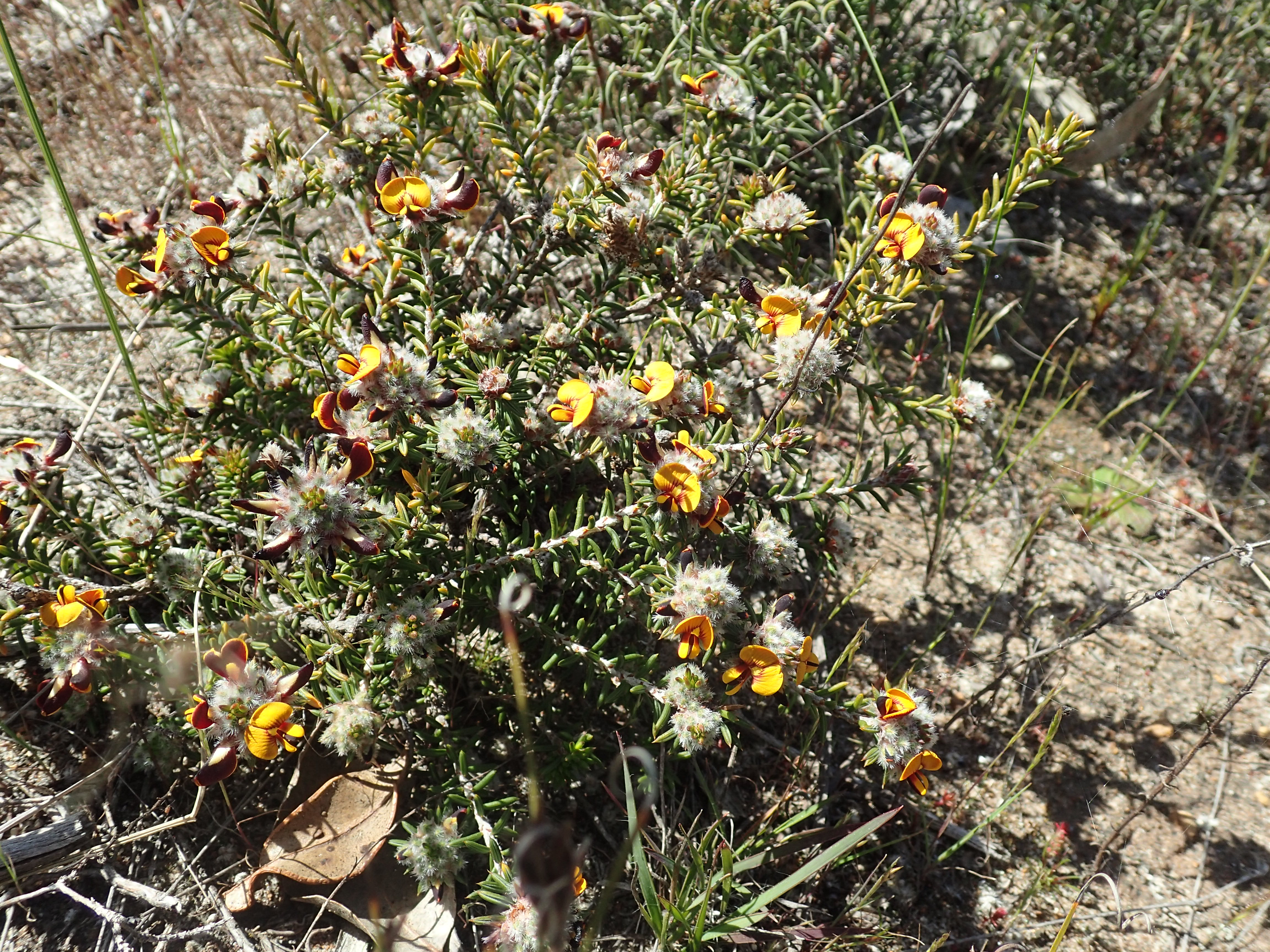
Habit near Jerdacuttup

Pultenaea barbata is a species of flowering plant in the family Fabaceae and is endemic to the south of Western Australia. It is a prostrate or spreading, spindly shrub with hairy, needle-shaped leaves and yellow, red, orange or brown flowers with red or yellow markings.

== Description ==
Pultenaea barbata is a spindly, prostrate or spreading shrub that typically grows to a height of 0.25–1.0 cm (0.098–0.394 in) with glabrous stems. The leaves are cylindrical but with a groove along the upper surface, 3–17 mm (0.12–0.67 in) long and 0.5–1.0 mm (0.020–0.039 in) wide and hairy with stipules at the base. The flowers are yellow, red, orange or brown with spots and blotches of yellow, red or orange. Each flower is borne on a hairy pedicel 2.5–3 mm (0.098–0.118 in) long with hairy bracteoles about 4 mm (0.16 in) long at the base. The sepals are 5.5–7 mm (0.22–0.28 in) long and hairy. The standard petal is 6.5–8 mm (0.26–0.31 in) long, the wings 7–7.5 mm (0.28–0.30 in) long and the keel is yellow, 5–7 mm (0.20–0.28 in) long. Flowering occurs from September to December and the fruit is an oval pod.

== Taxonomy and naming ==
Pultenaea barbata was first formally described in 1904 by Cecil Rollo Payton Andrews in the Journal of the West Australian Natural History Society from specimens he collected near the Phillips River in 1903. The specific epithet (barbata) means "bearded", referring to the style.

== Distribution and habitat ==
This pultenaea grows on plains in the Esperance Plains, Mallee and Warren biogeographic regions in the south of Western Australia.

== Conservation status ==
Pultenaea barbata is classified as "not threatened" by the Government of Western Australia Department of Parks and Wildlife.
