= Leucopogon denticulatus =

Scientific classification
- Kingdom: Plantae
- Clade: Tracheophytes
- Clade: Angiosperms
- Clade: Eudicots
- Clade: Asterids
- Order: Ericales
- Family: Ericaceae
- Genus: Leucopogon
- Species: L. denticulatus

Binomial name
- Leucopogon denticulatus W.Fitzg.
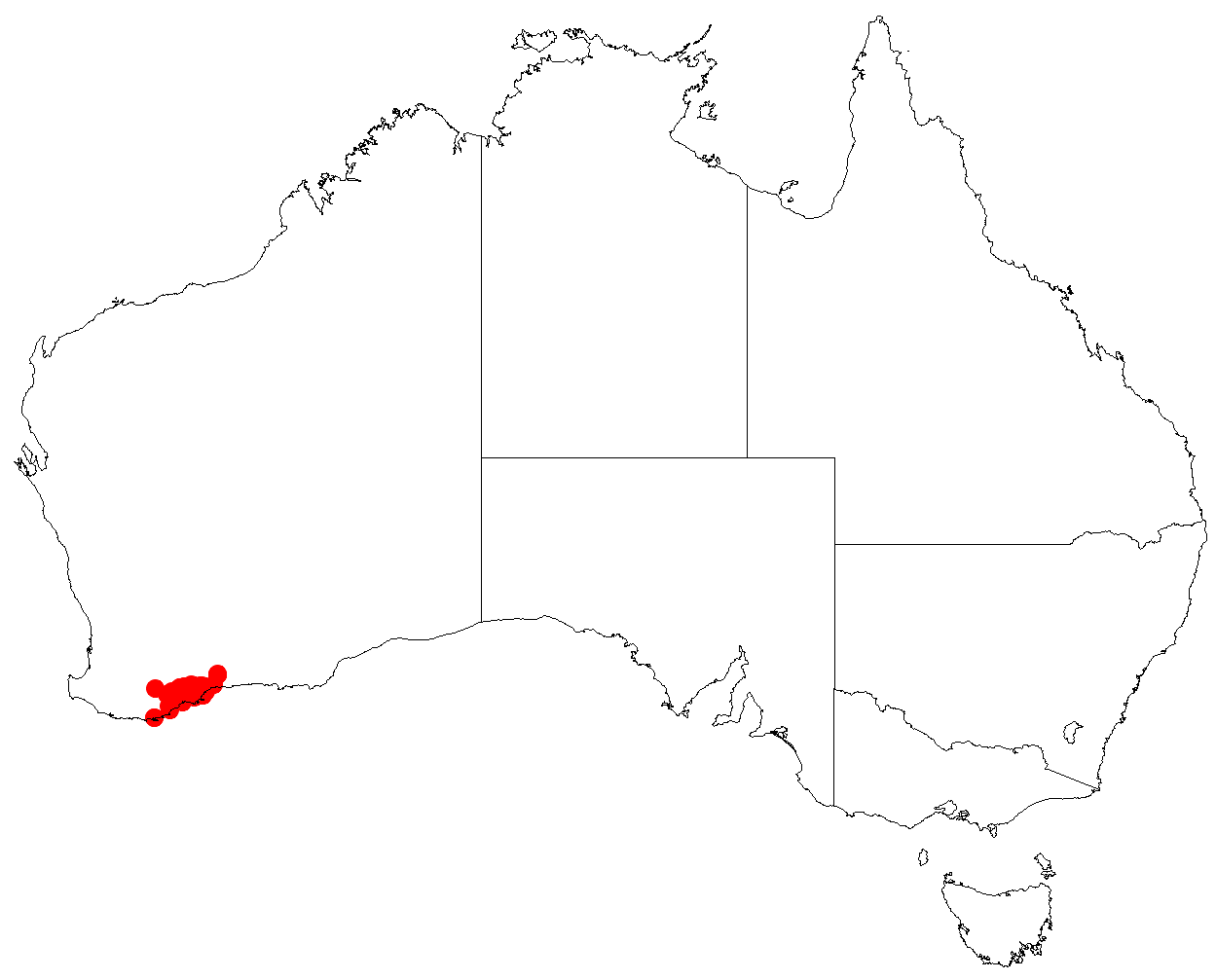
- Occurrence data from AVH

Species of plant

Leucopogon denticulatus is a species of flowering plant in the heath family Ericaceae and is endemic to the south-west of Western Australia. It is an erect shrub with hairy young branchlets, overlapping egg-shaped leaves with small teeth on the edges and white, tube-shaped flowers.

== Description ==
Leucopogon denticulatus is an erect shrub that typically grows to a height of 30–60 cm (12–24 in), its young branchlets hairy. The leaves are arranged in opposite pairs, forming 4 rows along the stems. The leaves are egg-shaped, overlapping, 2–3 mm (0.079–0.118 in) long with small teeth on the edges and two conspicuous veins either side of a prominent keel on the lower side. The flowers are arranged in short spikes near the ends of branches with leaf-like bracts and bracteoles. The sepals are lance-shaped, about 3 mm (0.12 in) long with short woolly hairs on the edges. The petals are white and joined at the base to form a tube about 4 mm (0.16 in) long, the lobes slightly longer than the petal tube. Flowering occurs from July to November, and the fruit is a drupe containing a single seed.

== Taxonomy and naming ==
Leucopogon denticulatus was first formally described in 1905 by William Vincent Fitzgerald in the Journal of the West Australian Natural History Society from specimens collected by Cecil Rollo Payton Andrews near Albany in 1903. The specific epithet (denticulatus) means "denticulate".

== Distribution and habitat ==
This leucopogon grows on sandplains and salt flats in the Esperance Plains, Jarrah Forest and Mallee bioregions of south-western Western Australia.

== Conservation status ==
Leucopogon denticulatus is classified as "not threatened" by the Western Australian Government Department of Biodiversity, Conservation and Attractions.
