= Banjup, Western Australia =

Banjup
- Suburb
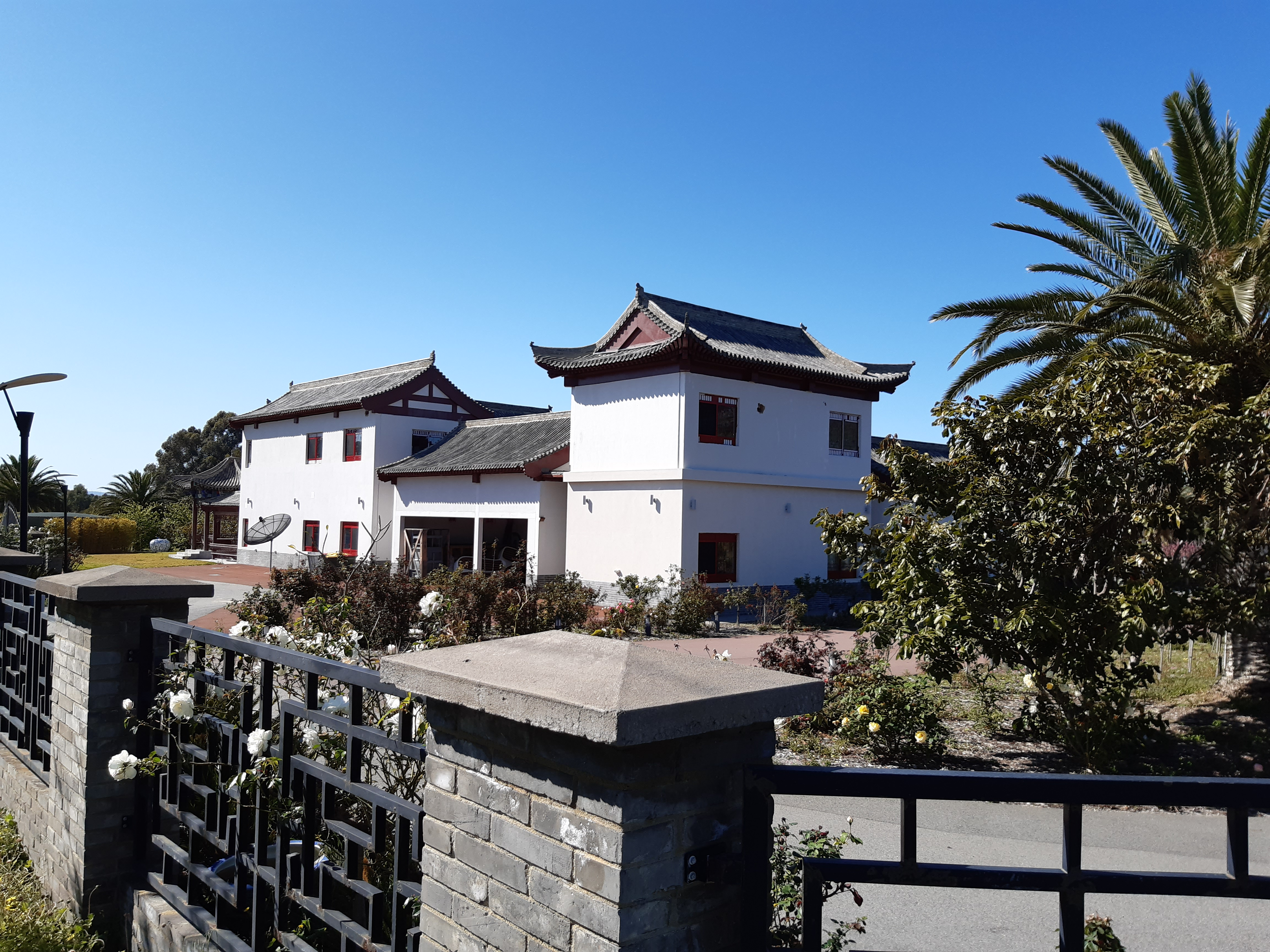
- Siheyuan style house in predominantly rural Banjup
- Interactive map of Banjup
- Coordinates: 32.124°S 115.876°E
- Country: Australia
- State: Western Australia
- City: Perth
- LGA: City of Cockburn
- Established: 1900s

Government
  - State electorate: Jandakot, Oakford
  - Federal division: Fremantle

Area
  - Total: 22.5 km^{2} (8.7 sq mi)

Population
  - Total: 1,377 (SAL 2021)
- Postcode: 6164
Suburbs around Banjup
Jandakot	Treeby	Piara Waters
Atwell and Aubin Grove	Banjup	Forrestdale
Wattleup and Hope Valley	Wandi	Oakford

Banjup is a suburb of Perth, Western Australia, located within the City of Cockburn. Its postcode is 6164. It is approximately 25 km (16 mi) south of the Perth central business district.

Banjup mainly consists of rural residential properties, with an average lot size of 2 hectares (5 acres), together with a small number of agriculture-based businesses (horticulture such as plant nurseries and flower growing). The suburb has a mixture of small scale rural properties which have been used for hobby farms (for example to run horses) and "lifestyle" residents who prefer open space and more space when compared to normal Perth suburban blocks.

Banjup is located on the Jandakot Water Mound. As part of the Western Australian State Government water resource protection policy development over the Jandakot Water Mound is limited to reduce the possibility of contamination from runoff from properties. As a consequence the number of animals per property is limited by the City of Cockburn zoning policies (for example 1 horse per 2 ha property - exemptions apply for established properties with livestock).

Much of the Jandakot Regional Park is located within Banjup.

== History ==
The name Bangup Lake was first recorded on an 1889 survey by James Oxley, probably from the Whadjuk Noongar word bangup/bangap meaning quokka. The name was applied to the surrounding district from the 1890s following the opening of the Jandakot Agricultural Area to settlement, with the spelling Banjupp adopted in the early 20th century. A siding on the Fremantle-Armadale railway line was named Bangup in 1907 and the spelling was altered to Banjup in the 1930s.

In 2016, the northern portion of Banjup (extending above Armadale Road) was turned into a new suburb, named Treeby.

== Banjup Memorial Park ==
Banjup Memorial Park was established after World War I. A gum tree was planted for each of the fourteen men from the district who had enlisted. If any of the trees dies, another is planted in its place. A plaque naming the men is displayed at the park and another is held at the Azelia Ley Homestead. The plaque names the men who returned safely as well as those who were wounded or killed. Cockburn RSL maintains Banjup Memorial Park.

Of the 14 Banjup men who served in the war, six were killed in action, four were wounded and the remaining four returned to Australia. This memorial records the highest "Killed in Action" and "Wounded" on a percentage basis, than any other war memorial in Western Australia.

== Transport ==
=== Bus ===
- 233 Cockburn Central Station to Gosnells Station – serves Armadale Road
- 518 Cockburn Central Station to Murdoch TAFE – serves Armadale Road
- 523 Cockburn Central Station to Treeby – serves Armadale Road
- 527 Cockburn Central Station to Aubin Grove Station – serves Tapper Road
- 529 Cockburn Central Station to Armadale Station – serves Armadale Road
- 537 Wandi to Aubin Grove Station – serves Lyon Road

== Community group ==
The Banjup Residents Group was established in 2010 to advocate on behalf of Banjup residents to local, state and federal governments. Approximately 45% of Banjup residents are members.
