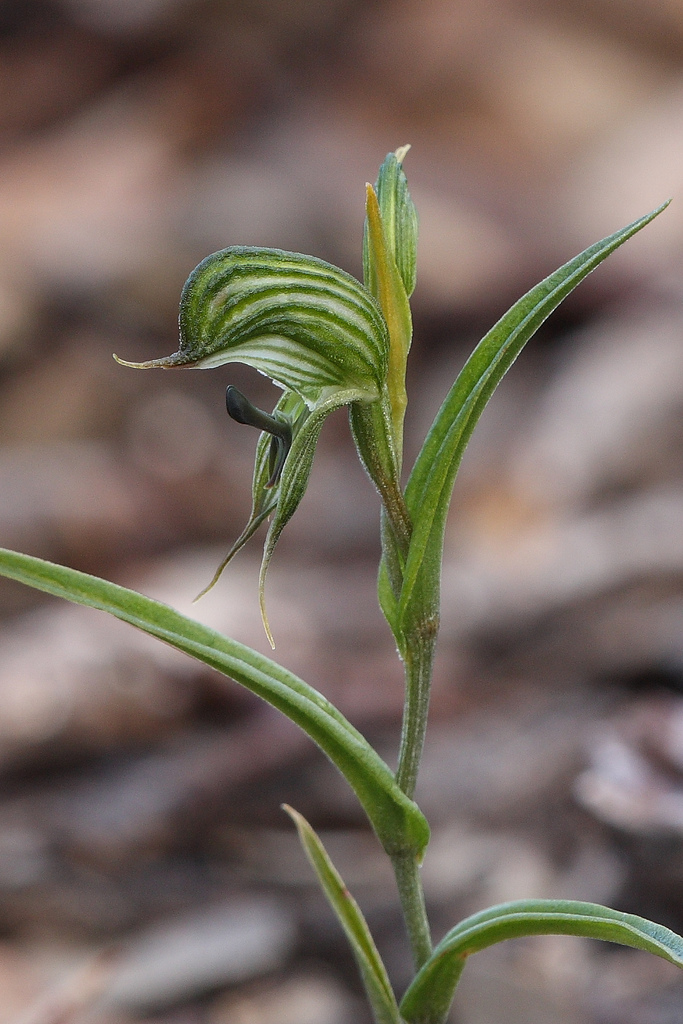
- Between Williams and Narrogin

Scientific classification
- Kingdom: Plantae
- Clade: Tracheophytes
- Clade: Angiosperms
- Clade: Monocots
- Order: Asparagales
- Family: Orchidaceae
- Subfamily: Orchidoideae
- Tribe: Cranichideae
- Genus: Pterostylis
- Species: P. sargentii

Binomial name
- Pterostylis sargentii C.R.P.Andrews

Synonyms
- Oligochaetochilus sargentii (C.R.P.Andrews) Szlach.; Pterostylis sargenti C.R.P.Andrews orth. var.; Ranorchis sargentii (C.R.P.Andrews) D.L.Jones & M.A.Clem.

= Pterostylis sargentii =

Frog greenhood

Species of orchid

Pterostylis sargentii commonly known as frog greenhood, is a plant in the orchid family Orchidaceae and is endemic to the south-west of Western Australia. It is a relatively common orchid which has up to six relatively small, white flowers with green or brown stripes and a fleshy, three-part, frog-like labellum. Non-flowering plants have a rosette of leaves on a short stalk.

== Description ==
Pterostylis sargentii, is a terrestrial, perennial, deciduous, herb with an underground tuber. Non-flowering plants have a rosette of between three and six leaves 5–18 mm (0.2–0.7 in) long and 3–8 mm (0.1–0.3 in) wide on a short stalk. Flowering plants lack a rosette but have between three and ten stem leaves which are 8–30 mm (0.3–1 in) long and 2–4 mm (0.08–0.2 in) wide on the flowering stem. Up to six white and green or brown striped flowers are borne on the flowering stem which is 50–200 mm (2–8 in) high. The flowers are 15–25 mm (0.6–1 in) long and 5–7 mm (0.2–0.3 in) wide. The dorsal sepal and petals form a hood or "galea" over the column with the dorsal sepal having a thread-like tip 2–3 mm (0.08–0.1 in) long. The lateral sepals turn downwards are joined for about half their length, then suddenly taper to narrow tips 4–6 mm (0.16–0.24 in) long. The labellum is 4–5 mm (0.16–0.20 in) long, about 2 mm (0.08 in) wide, dark brown with three lobes, the side ones with a large, horn-like appendage. Flowering occurs from July to October.

== Taxonomy and naming ==
Pterostylis sargentii was first formally described in 1905 by the British educator, Cecil Rollo Payton Andrews and the description was published in Journal of the West Australian Natural History Society. The specific epithet (sargentii) honours the Western Australian pharmacist Oswald Sargent who collected the type specimen.

== Distribution and habitat ==
Frog greenhood is found in a wide range of habitats throughout the south-west of Western Australia, but especially between Mullewa and Grass Patch.

== Conservation ==
Pterostylis sargentii is classified as "not threatened" by the Western Australian Government Department of Parks and Wildlife.
