= Cecil Andrews College =

School in Perth, Australia

Location
- Seville Grove, Perth, Western Australia; Australia; 32°08′30″S 115°59′34″E

Information
- Former name: West Armadale High School, Cecil Andrews Senior High School
- Type: Public co-educational high day school
- Motto: Achieving Excellence Together
- Established: 1980; 46 years ago
- Educational authority: WA Department of Education
- Principal: Mario Tufilli
- Years: 7–12
- Enrolment: 902 (2023)
- Campus type: Suburban
- Website: cecilandrewscollege.wa.edu.au

Cecil Andrews College is a public co-educational high day school, located on Seville Drive in the suburb of Seville Grove near Armadale, part of the metropolitan area of Perth, Western Australia.

Formerly known as West Armadale High School and Cecil Andrews Senior High School, it was established in 1980 and caters to students from Year 7 to Year 12.

== Overview ==
The school is named after Cecil Rollo Payton Andrews, a botanist, and an Inspector General of Schools in Western Australia from 1903 to 1912 and Director of Education of the WA Department of Education from 1912 to 1930. The school was renamed in Andrews' honour through the efforts of its foundation principal, Howard Rintoul.

Richard Hunter was the principal until 2013 when Stella (Ballae) Jinman became principal until 2024, where Mario Tufilli took lead. The school changed its name from Cecil Andrews Senior High School to Cecil Andrews College in 2017.

== See also ==
- List of schools in the Perth metropolitan area
