= Kewdale Freight Terminal =

Coordinates: 31.983994°S 115.966016°E

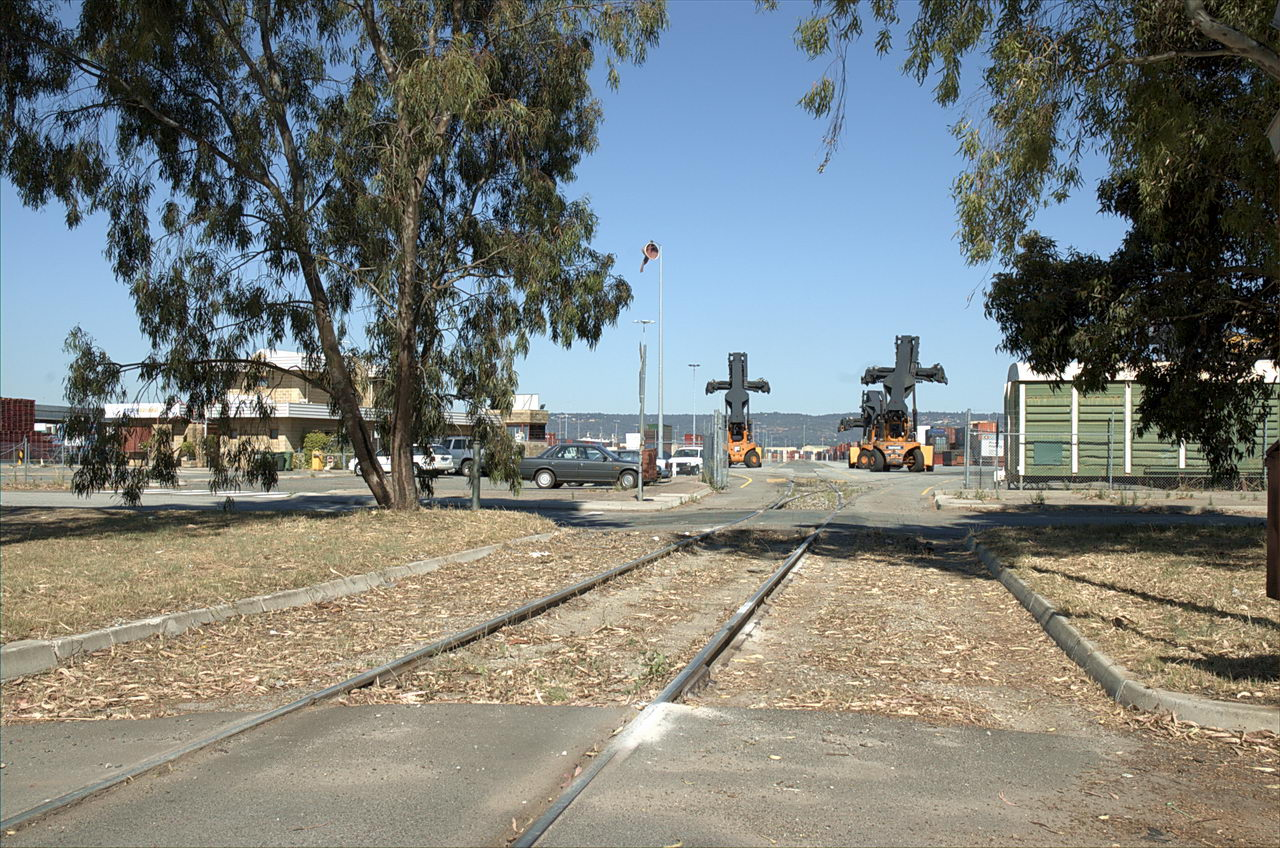
- Pacific National yard, Kewdale Freight Terminal
- Interactive map of Kewdale Freight Terminal

Location
- Location: Kewdale, Western Australia

Details
- Built: 1968
- Operated by: Pacific National
- Size: 17,500 m^{2} (188,000 sq ft)
- No. of platforms: 3
- Rail gauge: Standard gauge

Statistics
- Annual TEU: 330,000

Kewdale Freight Terminal is a large intermodal rail facility in the Perth suburb of Kewdale. Branching off the Kwinana railway line, it was built in the 1960s to replace the Perth Marshalling Yard. It initially comprised ten narrow gauge (1,067 mm or 3 ft 6.0 in) and seven standard gauge (1,435 mm or 4 ft 8.5 in) arrival roads.

The first narrow gauge sidings opened in early 1967; the first standard gauge sidings in November 1968.

== Users ==
- Pacific National yard and depot
- UGL Rail to service the carriages used on the Indian Pacific
- Transwa depot opened April 2005 to service WDA/WDB/WDC class railcars used on AvonLink, MerredinLink and Prospector services
- BP fuel siding
- Sadliers Transport siding
- Country Carriers siding
- BlueScope yard, moved to new facility in Forrestfield late 2005

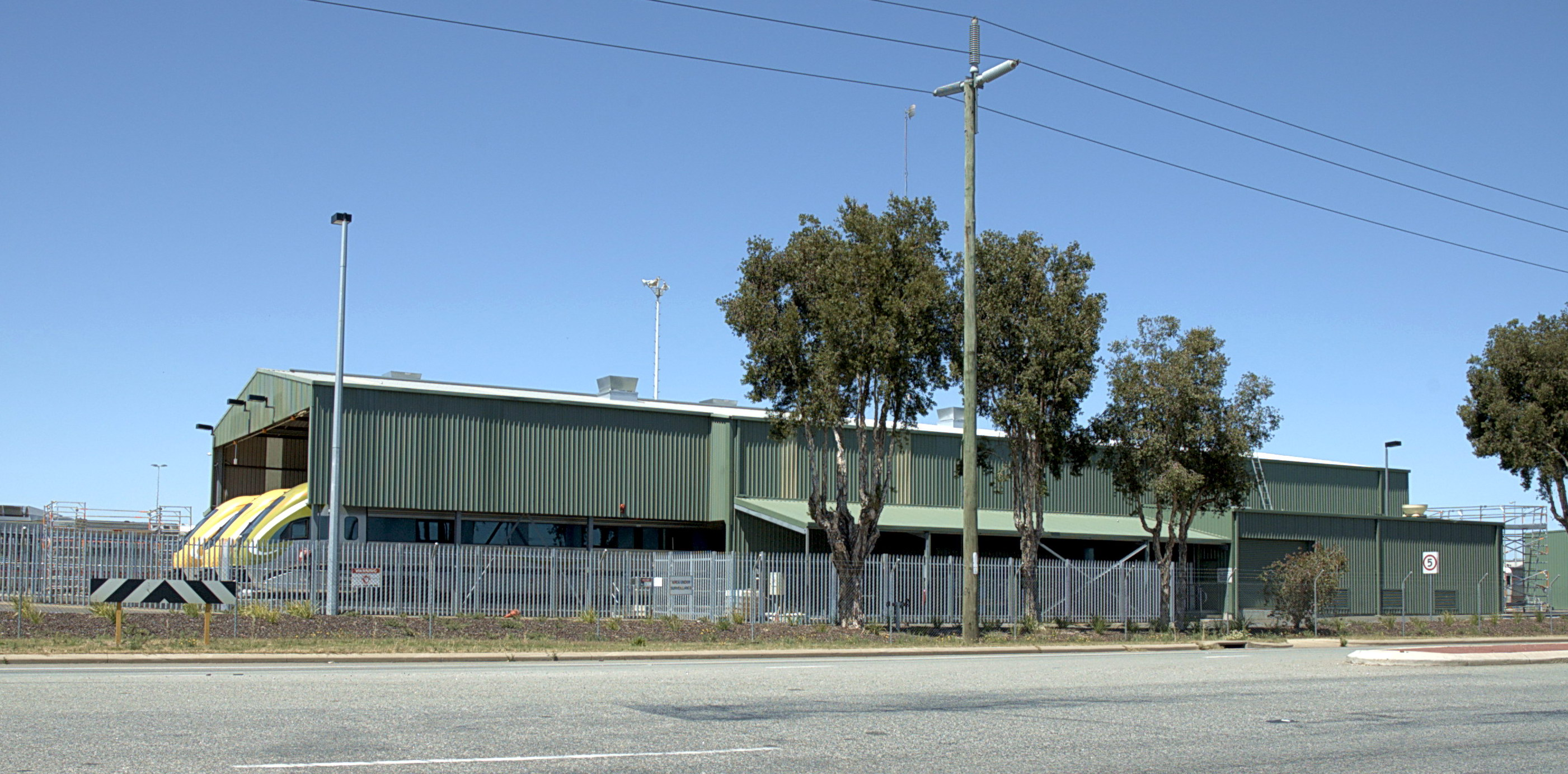
Transwa depot

== Redevelopment plans ==
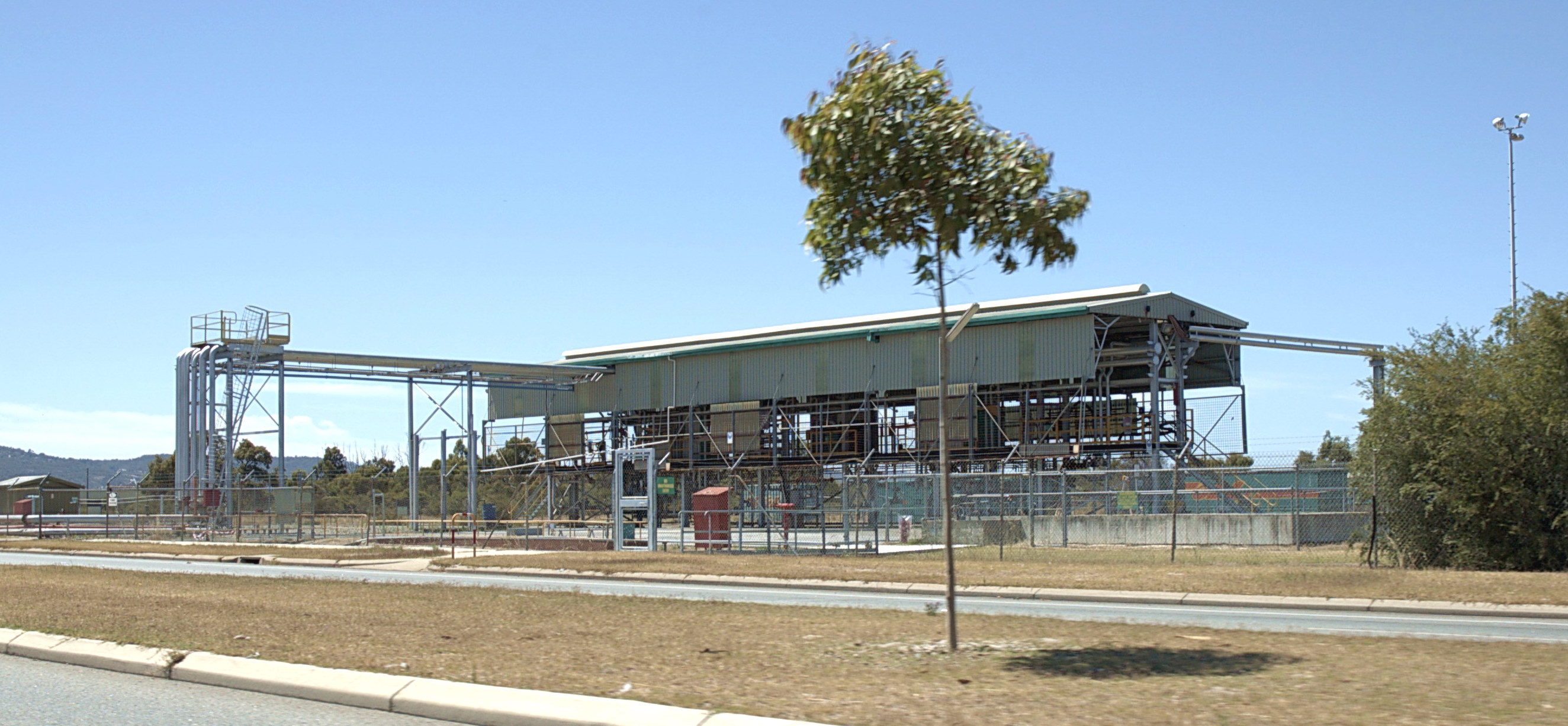
BP fuel siding

All rail freight in and out of this terminal is moved on a single standard gauge track that crosses Daddow Road, and this level crossing has become a congestion headache for road users in the industrial area. In November 2005 the federal government announced it had allocated $11.5 million for the construction of an overpass at the level crossing, which has since been completed.

Rail operators Aurizon, Pacific National and Transwa share common sections of the yard which can also lead to congestion. Apart from the departure road, the yard is unsignalled. Track occupation of the common sections – north service road, eastern diagonal, and western diagonal – is manually managed by radio communications with Arc Infrastructure Eastern Train Control.
