= Treeby, Western Australia =

Treeby
- Suburb
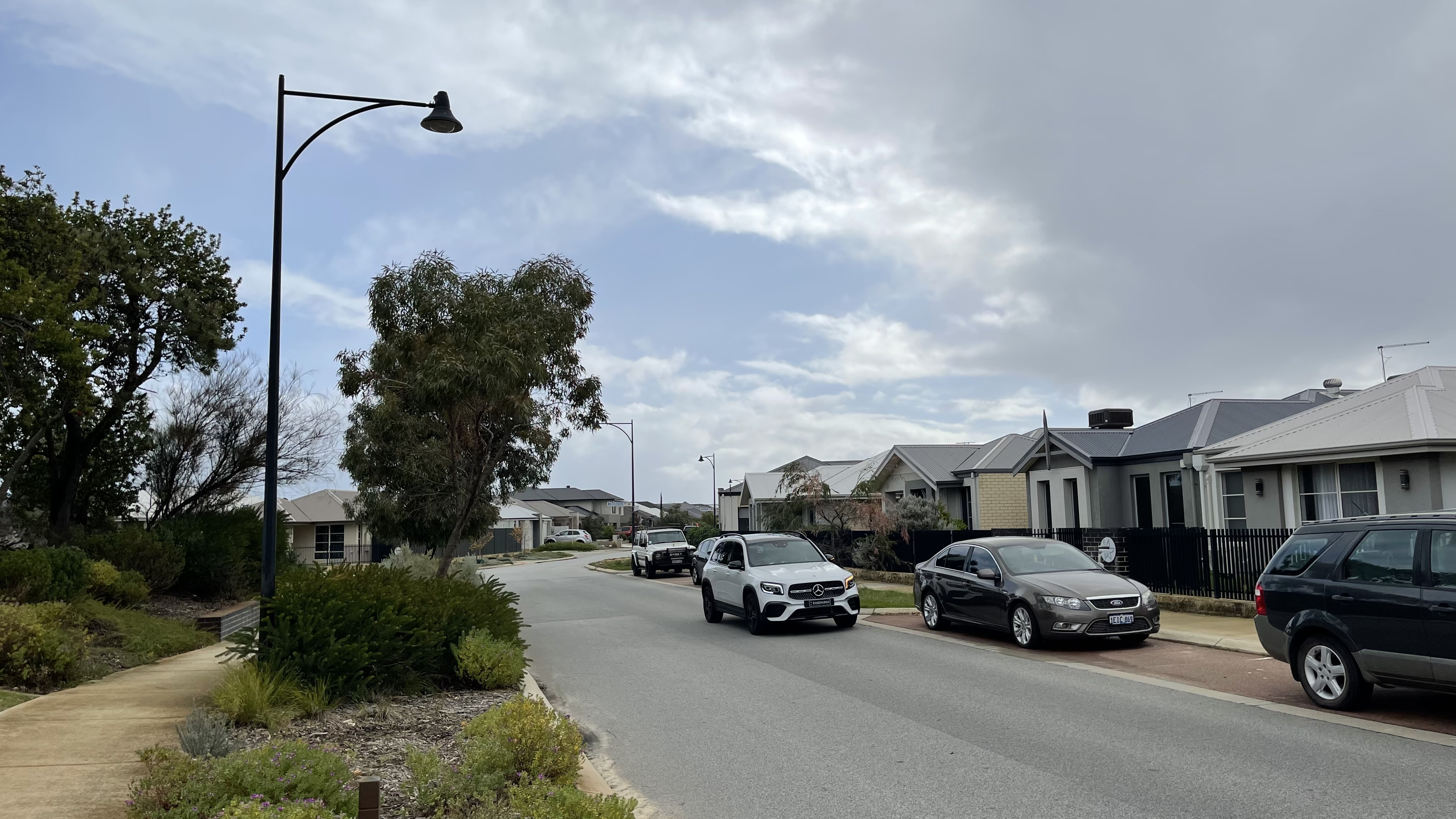
- Elderflower Street, Treeby, viewed from east.
- Interactive map of Treeby
- Coordinates: 32°07′15″S 115°53′33″E
- Country: Australia
- State: Western Australia
- Region: South Metropolitan Perth
- City: Perth
- LGA: City of Cockburn
- Location: 23 km (14 mi) from Perth
- Established: 2016; 10 years ago

Government
  - State electorate: Jandakot
  - Federal division: Fremantle

Area
  - Total: 8.2 km^{2} (3.2 sq mi)

Population
  - Total: 4,214 (SAL 2021)
- Postcode: 6164
Suburbs around Treeby
Jandakot	Canning Vale	Harrisdale
Jandakot	Treeby	Piara Waters
Atwell	Banjup	Forrestdale

Treeby is a southern suburb of Perth, Western Australia, located within the City of Cockburn. It is located on the east side of the Kwinana Freeway, close to Cockburn Central.

== History ==
Treeby is primarily a rural area, originally part of Banjup but made a separate suburb in 2016 from the portion of Banjup that extended north of Armadale Road. Situated on land traditionally inhabited by the Beeliar Whadjuk of the Noongar people, it is named after Joseph and Emma Treeby, early colonial settlers of the area. Arriving from South Australia with plans for apple orchards, the Treeby family established a market garden on over 14 hectares (35 acres) growing mainly cauliflower and cabbage.

In recent years, an area previously mined for sand was developed into a new residential estate called Calleya. Stockland has a large display village called Calleya with terraces, townhomes, house and land packages, and completed land. Stockland has sold over 1,100 house and land packages in Treeby. There is also a new estate called Kara in the western part of the suburb.

== Geography ==
Treeby is bounded in the north by the eastern border of the Jandakot Industrial Area, Dollier Street, Fraser Road, and the City of Canning, and in the east by the City of Armadale. The suburb is also bounded by Jandakot Road, Candelore Road and Acourt Road in the north, Warton Road in the east, Armadale Road in the south, and the suburb of Jandakot, Dollier Street and Solomon Road in the west.

== Education ==
Treeby has one primary school, Treeby Primary School, that opened in 2022 and caters for students from Kindergarten to Year 6. Its intake area encompasses southern parts of Treeby and Jandakot.

== Transport ==
=== Road ===
Treeby is served by nearby roads including Jandakot Road, Armadale Road, and Warton Road. Access to Perth in the north and Rockingham in the south is via the Kwinana Freeway, accessible via interchanges at Armadale Road and Berrigan Drive. Jandakot Airport, the general aviation airport in its immediate northwestern vicinity, is reachable via Berrigan Drive, and Armadale Road is connected to North Lake Road via a bridge over Kwinana Freeway that opened in 2021. Major roads in the suburb include Clementine Boulevard, Ghostgum Avenue, Greensand Promenade and Sapphire Drive.

=== Public transport ===
Transperth provides public bus services and trains for the Perth metropolitan area, and this includes regular bus services on route 523, which operates west to Cockburn Central station, located just outside the western boundary of Treeby, and Cockburn Gateway Shopping City in Success. Train services connect to Perth and Mandurah.

The suburb's closest railway stations are Cockburn Central and Aubin Grove, located in the suburbs of Cockburn Central and Atwell, respectively.

==== Bus ====
- 233 Cockburn Central Station to Gosnells Station – serves Armadale Road
- 518 Cockburn Central Station to Murdoch TAFE – serves Armadale Road
- 523 Cockburn Central Station to Treeby – serves Armadale Road, Ghostgum Avenue, Clementine Boulevard and Sapphire Drive
- 529 Cockburn Central Station to Armadale Station – serves Armadale Road

== See also ==
- List of Perth suburbs
