= Armadale Road =

Road in Perth, Western Australia

Armadale Road Western Australia

General information
- Type: Road
- Length: 16.2 km (10 mi)
- Opened: 1970s
- Route number(s): State Route 14

Major junctions
- East end: Albany Highway (State Route 30), Armadale
- Tonkin Highway (State Route 4); Nicholson Road (State Route 31); Beeliar Drive (State Route 14)
- West end: Kwinana Freeway (State Route 2)

Location(s)
- Major suburbs: Armadale, Brookdale, Forrestdale, Banjup, Atwell

Armadale Road is a major road in the south and south east of the Perth Metropolitan Area. It serves three purposes: firstly, providing a main route from Armadale to Fremantle; secondly, connecting Armadale to the Kwinana Freeway; and thirdly, since 2005, connecting it to the Tonkin Highway which ferries traffic to the eastern suburbs, Perth Airport and the Forrestfield and Kewdale industrial areas.

It commences at the Albany Highway/South Western Highway intersection in central Armadale, and follows the dismantled Spearwood–Armadale railway line west then northwest for 16.2 kilometres (10.1 mi) to terminate at the Kwinana Freeway/North Lake Road interchange in Cockburn Central. The road is signed as State Route 14 for almost its entire length, with the section west of Beeliar Drive unsigned.

== History ==
By 1973, the Shire of Armadale–Kelmscott was advocating for a bypass road to be built along the route of the former Spearwood–Armadale railway line.

Construction started in 1978 for a single carriageway from Abbey Road in Armadale to Forrest Road in Forrestdale. In 1983 it was extended it to the current Albany Highway/South Western Highway intersection via a dual carriageway section and Jull Street was subsequently disconnected from the intersection. In 1991 the dual carriageway was extended west to just past Seville Drive.

Before the mid 1990s Forrest Road was the main road from Hamilton Hill to Armadale. The realignment of Forrest Road in 1991, as the Kwinana Freeway was extended, saw it renamed a few years later as Armadale Road up to the freeway (with most of the remainder of the old Forrest Road being renamed North Lake Road).

As part of the Tonkin Highway extension from 2003 to 2005, Armadale Road was upgraded to a dual carriageway from Lake Road to Anstey Road. This was done in anticipation of the large volumes of traffic expected due to the extension.

== Recent upgrades ==
Following the 2017 election of Western Australian Labor to the state parliament, the controversial Perth Freight Link project was cancelled. This allowed for a new Commonwealth-State agreement to be reached, which would allow for A$2.3 billion of funding to be relocated to other road projects. Two of these projects were the $145-million Armadale Road dual carriage upgrade between Anstey Road and Tapper Road, as well as the $237-million North Lake Road bridge over Kwinana Freeway.

=== Anstey Road to Tapper Road ===
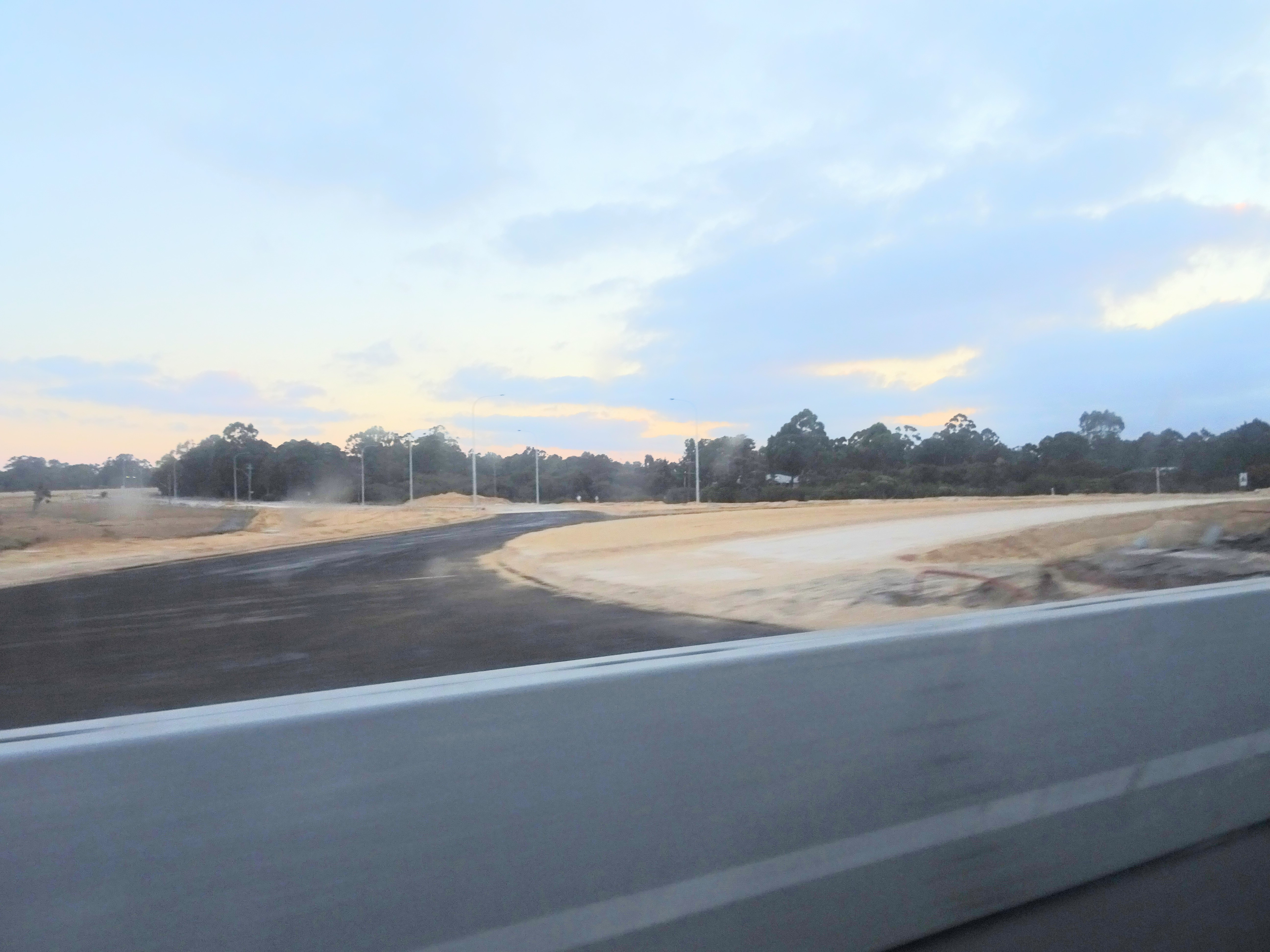
Intersection of Armadale and Liddelow roads under construction in January 2019

Work commenced on 7 March 2018, with Premier Mark McGowan, Federal Minister for Urban Infrastructure and Cities Paul Fletcher and State Transport Minister Rita Saffioti turning the first sod on the project. It was completed by February 2020.

The project involved the widening of the road to a dual carriageway. The intersection with Nicholson Road, one of the state's worst black spots, was upgraded to a bridge over a roundabout with the bridge named the Hugo Throssell VC Bridge after the late Victoria Cross Recipient. A shared path for pedestrians and cyclists was built adjacent to the road, with various facilities being installed along the length of the road. This was opened in March 2020. The upgrade also delivered new roundabouts at the intersection with Liddelow Road and at the intersection with Taylor Road and Wright Road, as well as upgrades at the Ghostgum Avenue intersection.

=== Armadale Road to North Lake Road Bridge ===
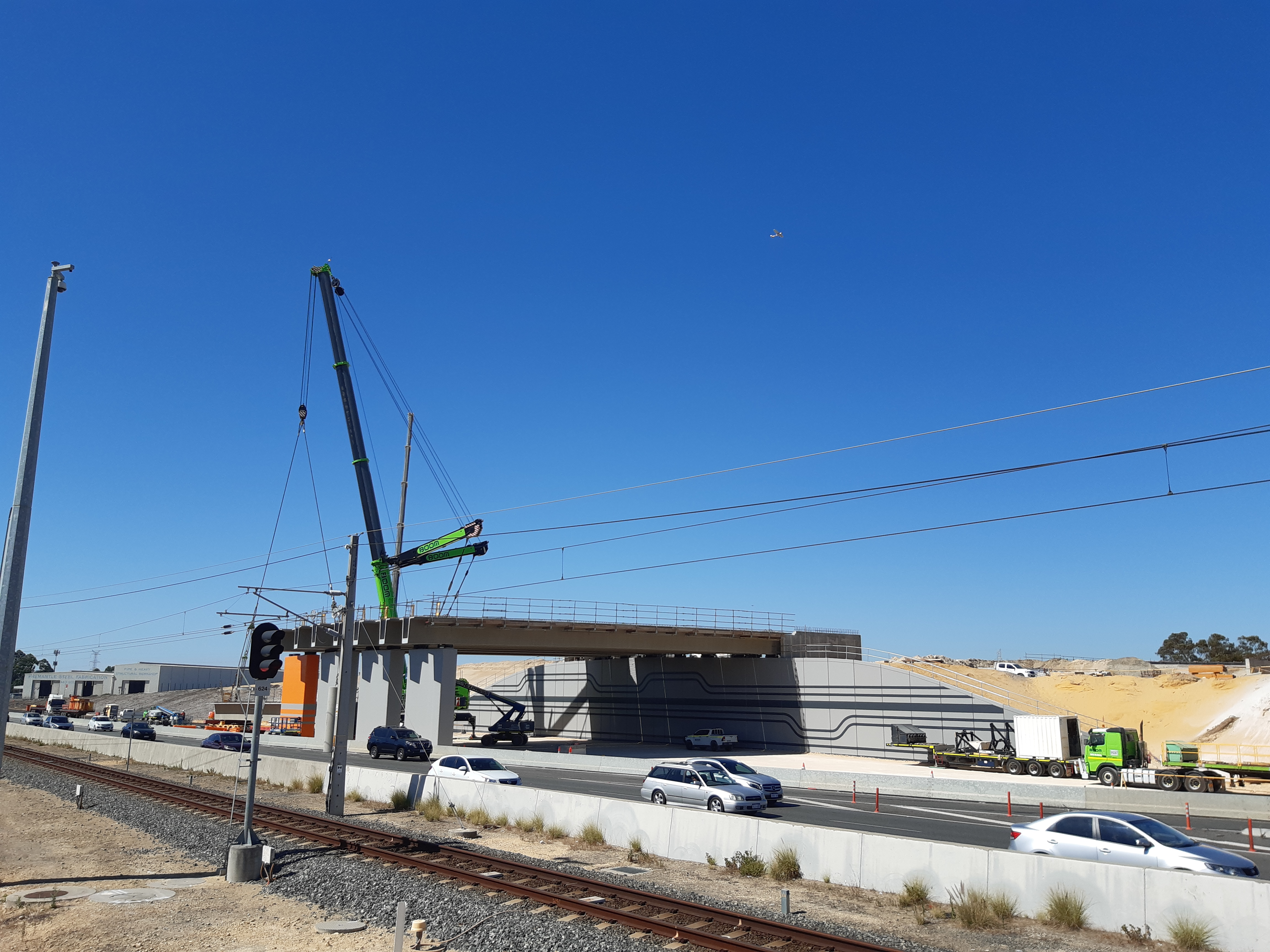
Construction of the bridge in December 2020

This project involved the construction of a bridge over Kwinana Freeway with north-facing on and off ramps, connecting Armadale Road to North Lake Road. This removed another one of the state's black spots, the Beeliar Drive and Midgegooroo Avenue intersection, reduce congestion on the Kwinana Freeway interchange, and improve access to Cockburn Central railway station. Grade separated roundabouts will be constructed at Tapper Road and Verde Drive and at a new Beeliar Drive and Solomon Road intersection. Going westwards Armadale Road is constructed to pass over the former roundabout as an overpass bridge but then lowers to pass under the latter roundabout, leading to the intersections being termed a duck and dive interchange.

This project will link with the Kwinana Freeway northbound widening from Russell Road to Roe Highway, the aforementioned Armadale Road widening and the extension of the Thornlie branch to terminate at Cockburn Central. Construction commenced in late 2019, with the new roads opening to traffic on 16 December 2021.

== Major intersections ==
LGA	Location	km	mi	Destinations	Notes
Armadale	Armadale	0	0.0	Albany Highway (State Route 30) north, east / South Western Highway (State Route 20) south – Perth, Bunbury, Albany	Traffic light intersection; Armadale Road continues as Albany Highway east of this point
Armadale	Armadale	0.3	0.19	Church Avenue	
Armadale	Armadale	0.5	0.31	Orchard Avenue	
Armadale	Armadale	0.9	0.56	Abbey Road southwest / Railway Avenue northeast – Brookdale, Kelmscott	Traffic light intersection
Armadale	Armadale	2.5	1.6	Seventh Road	
Armadale	Armadale–Seville Grove boundary	2.9	1.8	Seville Drive – Seville Grove	Traffic light intersection
Armadale	Armadale–Seville Grove–Haynes tripoint	3.6	2.2	Eighth Road	
Armadale	Seville Grove–Haynes–Forrestdale tripoint	4.6	2.9	Ranford Road (State Route 13) north / Twelfth Road south – Canning Vale, Fremantle	Roundabout
Armadale	Forrestdale	5.3	3.3	Alex Wood Drive	
Armadale	Forrestdale	6.2	3.9	Tonkin Highway (State Route 4) – Byford, Welshpool, Morley	Traffic light intersection
Armadale	Forrestdale	6.6	4.1	MacFarlane Road	Traffic light intersection. Formerly known as Keane Road
Armadale	Forrestdale	8.0	5.0	Anstey Road north / Weld Street south	Roundabout
Armadale	Forrestdale–Piara Waters boundary	9.4	5.8	Nicholson Road (State Route 31) – Oakford, Canning Vale	Roundabout interchange favouring Armadale Road. Overpass known as the Hugo Throssell VC Bridge
Armadale	Forrestdale–Piara Waters boundary	11.1	6.9	Taylor Road south / Wright Road north – Harrisdale	Roundabout
Armadale–Cockburn boundary	Forrestdale–Piara Waters–Treeby–Banjup quadripoint	12.1	7.5	Warton Road – Southern River, Gosnells	Traffic light intersection
Cockburn	Treeby–Banjup boundary	13.1	8.1	Liddelow Road south / Torwood Avenue north	Roundabout
Cockburn	Treeby–Banjup boundary	14.2	8.8	Ghostgum Avenue	Traffic light intersection
Cockburn	Banjup–Atwell–Jandakot tripoint	14.9	9.3	Tapper Road south / Verde Drive north – Atwell, Aubin Grove	The Duck and Dive. A set of two roundabout interchanges favouring Armadale Road as an overpass at Tapper Road / Verde Drive before switching to an underpass at Beeliar Drive / Solomon Road. Modified collector-distributor lanes with pedestrian signals connect the two roundabouts. State Route 14 western concurrency terminus at Beeliar Drive. Provides access to the Kwinana Freeway southbound.
Cockburn	Atwell–Jandakot boundary	15.4	9.6	Beeliar Drive (State Route 14) west / Solomon Road east – Cockburn Central, Success, Beeliar, Yangebup	The Duck and Dive. A set of two roundabout interchanges favouring Armadale Road as an overpass at Tapper Road / Verde Drive before switching to an underpass at Beeliar Drive / Solomon Road. Modified collector-distributor lanes with pedestrian signals connect the two roundabouts. State Route 14 western concurrency terminus at Beeliar Drive. Provides access to the Kwinana Freeway southbound.
Cockburn	Cockburn Central–Jandakot boundary	15.9	9.9	North Lake Road west / Kwinana Freeway (State Route 2) north / Knock Way south – North Lake, Fremantle, Perth	Half diamond interchange with southbound exit and northbound entry only. Westbound terminus: continues as North Lake Road. Knock Way provides access to Cockburn Central railway station for westbound traffic only
Concurrency terminus; Incomplete access

== Speed limits ==
The road has speed limits of 70 kilometres per hour (43 mph) between the Kwinana Freeway and Tapper Road in Atwell, and between the Armadale railway line and Albany Highway; all other sections are signed 80 kilometres per hour (50 mph).
