= Seville Grove, Western Australia =

Seville Grove Perth, Western Australia
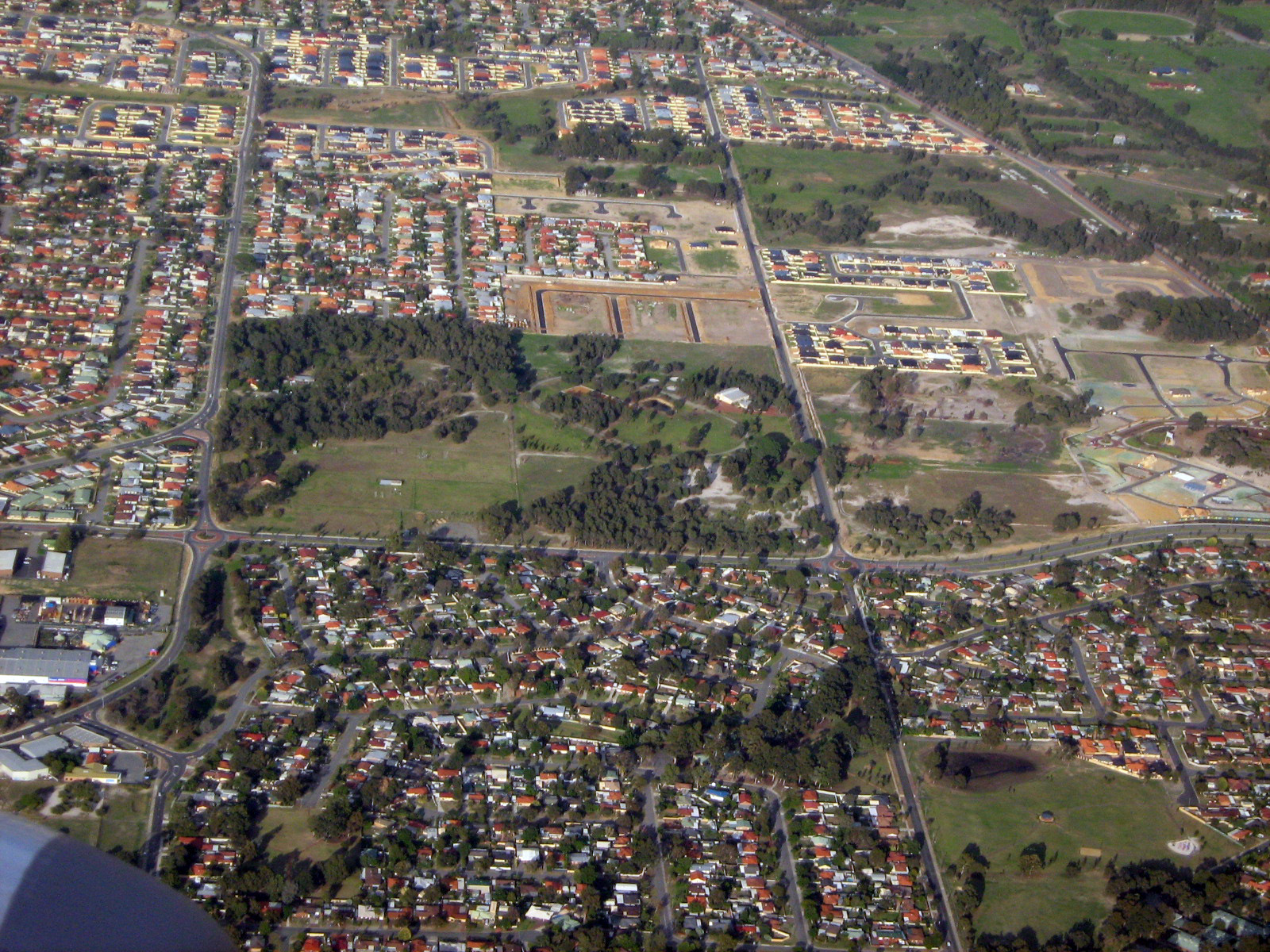
- Aerial view of Seville Grove in 2008
- Coordinates: 32.136°S 115.983°E
- Population: 11,408 (SAL 2021)
- Established: 1990s
- Postcode(s): 6112
- Area: 4.3 km^{2} (1.7 sq mi)
- Location: 30 km (19 mi) from Perth; 4 km (2 mi) from Armadale
- LGA(s): City of Armadale
- State electorate(s): Armadale
- Federal division(s): Burt
Suburbs around Seville Grove:
Champion Lakes	Kelmscott	Kelmscott
Forrestdale	Seville Grove	Armadale
Brookdale	Brookdale	Armadale

Seville Grove is a suburb of Perth, Western Australia in the City of Armadale.

Seville Grove used to be part of Armadale proper but was established as a separate suburb in 2002.

It contains a public high school, Cecil Andrews College, as well as a library, a Scout Hall and Swan TAFE's Equine Training Centre. It is served by buses from Armadale and Kelmscott and is close to Sherwood train station.

Seville Grove is home to new housing estates.

== Transport ==
=== Bus ===
- 243 Armadale Station to Kelmscott Station – serves Seville Drive and Champion Drive
- 244 Armadale Station to Kelmscott Station – serves Armadale Road, Seville Drive, Braemore Street, Williams Road and Champion Drive
- 245 Armadale Station to Kelmscott Station – serves Seville Drive, Strawberry Drive, San Jacinta Road, Hesketh Avenue and Westfield Road
- 519 Armadale Station to Murdoch TAFE – serves Armadale Road
- 529 Armadale Station to Cockburn Central Station – serves Armadale Road
