= Electoral district of Jandakot =

State electoral district of Western Australia

Jandakot Western Australia—Legislative Assembly
- Interactive map of electoral district boundaries from the 2025 state election
- State: Western Australia
- Dates current: 2025
- MP: Stephen Pratt
- Party: Labor
- Namesake: Jandakot
- Electors: 30,582 (2025)
- Area: 62 km^{2} (23.9 sq mi)
- Demographic: Metropolitan
- Coordinates: 32.10°S 115.89°E
Electorates around Jandakot:
Bateman	Riverton	Cannington; Thornlie
Bibra Lake	Jandakot	Southern River
Cockburn	Oakford	Oakford

Jandakot is an electoral district of the Legislative Assembly in the Australian state of Western Australia.

The district is based in the southern suburbs of Perth and is named for the suburb of Jandakot. It also includes the suburbs of Atwell, Leeming and Treeby as well as parts of Banjup, Canning Vale and Harrisdale.

Politically, the district is a marginal one. Based on the results of the 2005 state election, the district was created with a Labor Party majority of 53.6% to 46.4% versus the Liberal Party.

== History ==
Jandakot was first created in 1988 for the 1989 state election, largely replacing the abolished seat of Murdoch. It contained the suburbs of Bull Creek, Leeming and western and southern Willetton, as well as part of Canning Vale and Jandakot Airport.

Its first member was the then Liberal Opposition Leader, Barry MacKinnon. MacKinnon retired from politics in 1993 after being ousted as leader in favour of Richard Court a year earlier, and Mike Board, who later became a Minister in the Court government, won the seat in his stead. The name Murdoch was restored by the 1994 redistribution, taking effect at the 1996 state election.

A new seat named Jandakot was created ahead of the 2008 state election when the number of metropolitan seats was increased in accordance with the new one vote one value legislation on 29 October 2007. The new district was drawn from parts of the existing electorates of Cockburn, Murdoch, Riverton, Serpentine-Jarrahdale and Southern River. It included the suburbs of Canning Vale (part), Forrestdale, Harrisdale, Leeming, Piara Waters and, upon its creation in 2016, Treeby.

Population growth on Perth's outer predicated re-drawing of the state electoral boundaries again in 2015 ahead of the 2017 State Election, with the seat of Jandakot shifting eastward. A further redistribution in 2023 caused Jandakot to contract westwards, with the south-eastern part of the electorate (Forrestdale, Piara Waters and most of Harrisdale) transferred to the new seat of Oakford while gaining Atwell and Banjup (part) from Cockburn and the rest of Leeming from Riverton. Incumbent MP Yaz Mubarakai transferred to the new electorate for the 2025 state election, with Stephen Pratt retaining the seat for Labor.

== Members for Jandakot ==
Jandakot (1989–1996)
Member	Party	Term
Barry MacKinnon	Liberal	1989–1993
Mike Board	Liberal	1993–1996
Jandakot (2008–present)
Joe Francis	Liberal	2008–2017
Yaz Mubarakai	Labor	2017–2025
Stephen Pratt	Labor	2025–present

== Election results ==
2025 Western Australian state election: Jandakot
Party	Candidate	Votes	%	±%
Labor	Stephen Pratt	12,006	45.1	−16.0
Liberal	Nicole Robins	9,152	34.3	+8.1
Greens	Ariana Carot Collins	2,891	10.9	+5.2
One Nation	Igor Mironenko	1,139	4.3	+2.9
Christians	Marianne Pretorius	1,087	4.1	+1.7
Shooters, Fishers, Farmers	Alan Brian Strahan	369	1.4	+1.4
Total formal votes		26,644	96.3	−0.7
Informal votes		1,034	3.7	+0.7
Turnout		27,678	90.5	+6.8
Two-party-preferred result
Labor	Stephen Pratt	15,028	56.4	−11.7
Liberal	Nicole Robins	11,608	43.6	+11.7
Labor hold		Swing	−11.7	
