= Stephen Pratt =

Australian politician

Stephen Pratt MLA

Member of the Western Australian Legislative Council for South Metropolitan Region
- In office 22 May 2021 – 11 February 2025
- Succeeded by: Victoria Helps

Member of the Western Australian Legislative Assembly for Jandakot
- Incumbent
- Assumed office 8 March 2025
- Preceded by: Yaz Mubarakai

Personal details
- Born: 8 July 1984 (age 42) Subiaco, Western Australia
- Party: Labor
- Education: University of Notre Dame Australia
- Profession: Politician, senior advisor

Stephen Joel Pratt (born 8 July 1984) is an Australian politician and former local government councillor for the City of Cockburn and senior ministerial advisor to Roger Cook.

At the 2021 Western Australian state election, Pratt was elected to the Western Australian Legislative Council as a Labor member for South Metropolitan.

On 11 February 2025, Pratt resigned from the Legislative Council to contest the seat of Jandakot at the 2025 state election, where he was elected.

Western Australian Legislative Assembly
Preceded by Yaz Mubarakai	Member for Jandakot; 2025–present	Incumbent
