= Robbs Jetty Abattoir =

Former abattoir in Perth, Western Australia

Coordinates: 32.088582°S 115.759671°E

Robbs Jetty Abattoir was an operation that was part of the Western Australia government meat export industry between 1921 and 1994. It was located in South Fremantle and it utilised the transport services provided by the Robbs Jetty railway station.

It was known variously as Robb Jetty, Robbs Jetty and Robb's Jetty. The abattoir grew out of a complex of private meatworks established in the late 19th century, including Forrest, Emanuel & Company and Connor, Doherty & Durack.

In 1921 the Fremantle Freezing Works began operation as one of the three State Government regulated abattoirs under the 1909 Abattoir Act. The abattoir was the destination of the Stacey's Lamb Train and annual delivery on the Western Australian Government Railway system. The Stacy train's route was from Badjaling to Robbs Jetty and it usually required changes in the locomotive being used over the route.

Adjacent to abattoirs in Perth, local properties were utilised by skin drying sheds. At times the smells from the operations were objected to. The Midland Junction abattoir was operating at approximately the same time as the Robbs Jetty operation, as well as the Wyndham Meatworks 1919 to 1985. The Air Beef Scheme lasted a shorter time (between 1949 and 1965). All of these operations were linked to the Western Australia's meat industry efforts to have adequate facility to be involved in meat export.

The Robbs Jetty abattoir was closed in 1994; the jetty itself had previously been dismantled in the 1960s. The chimney is the only remaining part of the large complex of buildings that included offices, holding yards, freezer and chiller facilities. The chimney is listed in the State Register of Heritage Places.

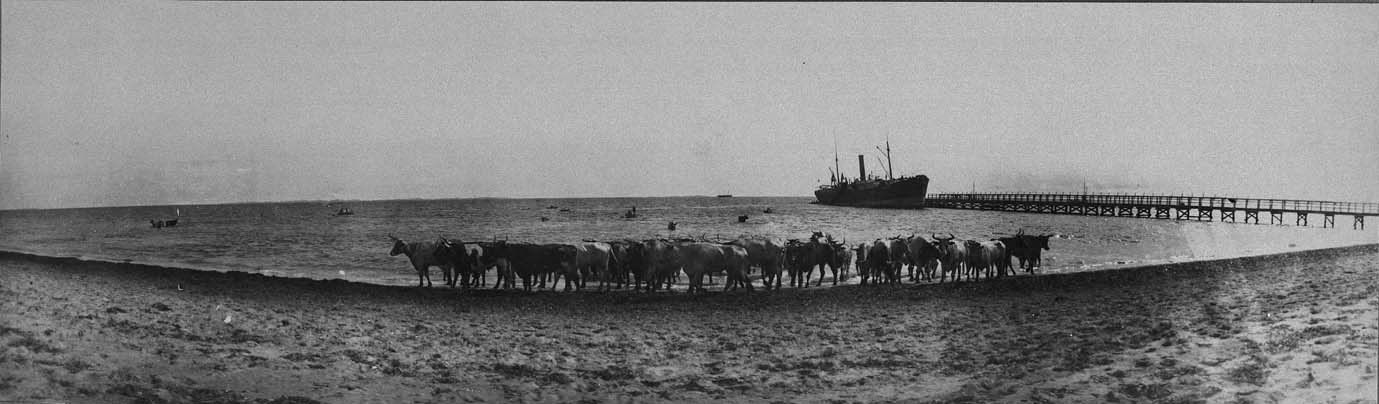
Cattle being unloaded from a ship at Robb Jetty in the 1920s. Livestock were shipped from the Kimberley.

== Robb Jetty Chimney ==
The Robb Jetty Chimney is situated to the west of Cockburn Road and the east of Robb Road. The chimney stands as the only remnant of the former Robb Jetty abattoir, which was demolished in 1995. The Abattoir was for many years a component of the meat industry in Western Australia, and a major source of employment.

The remaining chimney is a cylindrical stack resting on a square block of masonry with a total height of approximately 28 metres (92 ft). The brickwork is English bond with stretcher bricks curved to the radius of the shaft and header bricks tapered to maintain a uniform thickness of the mortar joints. The chimney is unlined, with the wall thickness decreasing from 470 millimetres (19 in) just above the plinth to 230 millimetres (9.1 in) at the top.
