= Yaz Mubarakai =

Australian politician

Yaz Mubarakai MLA
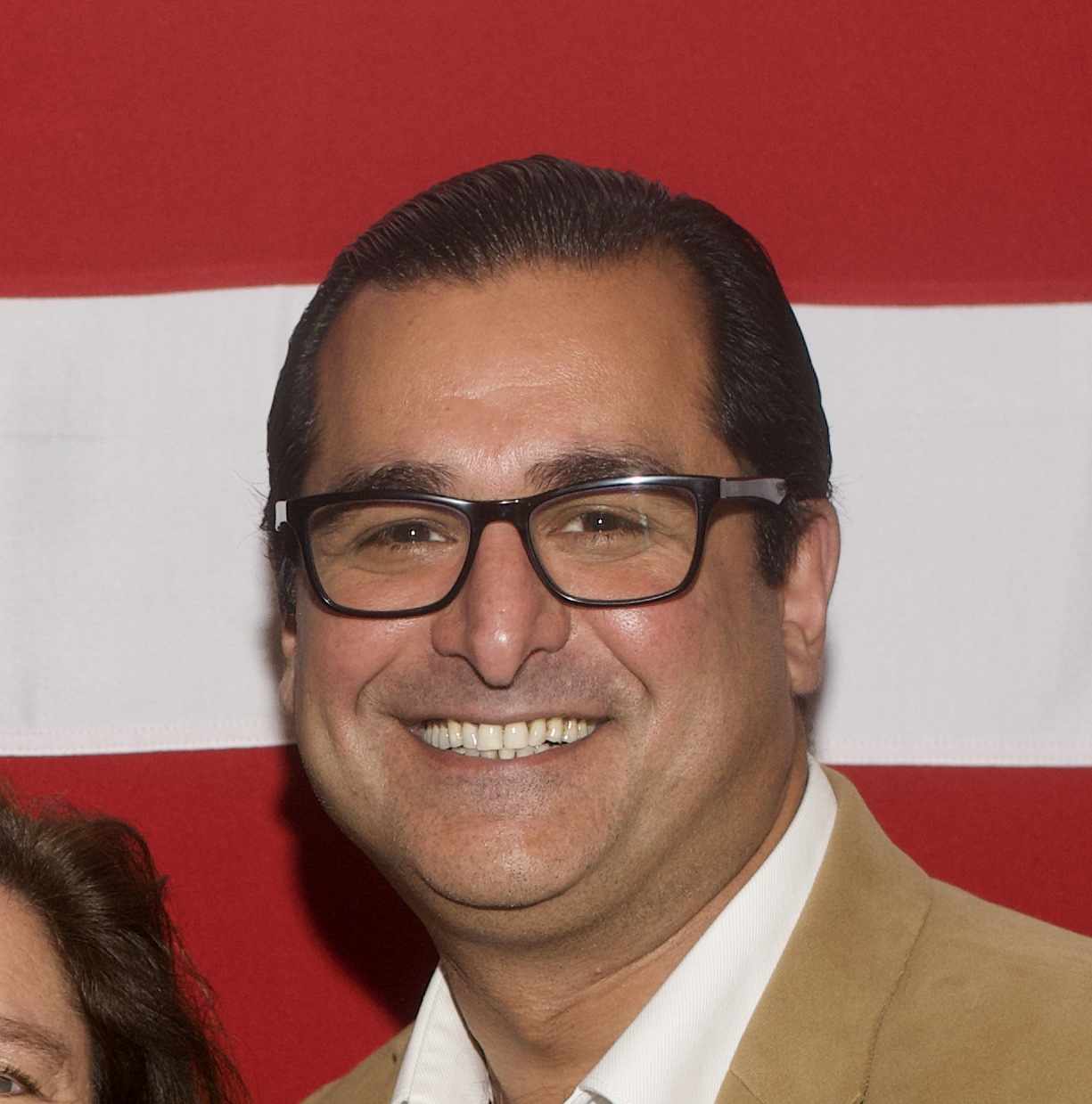
- Mubarakai in 2019

Member of the Western Australian Legislative Assembly for Oakford
- Incumbent
- Assumed office 8 March 2025
- Preceded by: Seat created

Member of the Western Australian Legislative Assembly for Jandakot
- In office 11 March 2017 – 8 March 2025
- Preceded by: Joe Francis
- Succeeded by: Stephen Pratt

Personal details
- Born: 24 October 1975 (age 50) Dahanu , Maharashtra, India
- Party: Labor
- Spouse: Jerestine Mubarakai
- Occupation: Small business owner and entrepreneur
- Website: jandakot.walabor.org.au

Shahyaz Yezdi "Yaz" Mubarakai (born 24 October 1975) is an Indian-born Australian politician. He has been a Labor member of the Western Australian Legislative Assembly since the 2017 state election, representing Jandakot from 2017 to 2025. Following the 2025 Western Australia state election, Mubarakai became the inaugural MP for the new electorate of Oakford.

Mubarakai was born in India in 1975. He later moved to Australia in 1997. He belongs to the Parsi community. He owns the post office at Success, a restaurant Majestic India and Cafe Royal in Cockburn Central. He previously served on Cockburn City Council.

Western Australian Legislative Assembly
Preceded by Joe Francis	Member for Jandakot; 2017–2025	Succeeded by Stephen Pratt
New seat	Member for Oakford; 2025–present	Incumbent
