= Forrestfield Marshalling Yard =

Marshalling yard in Forrestfield, Western Australia

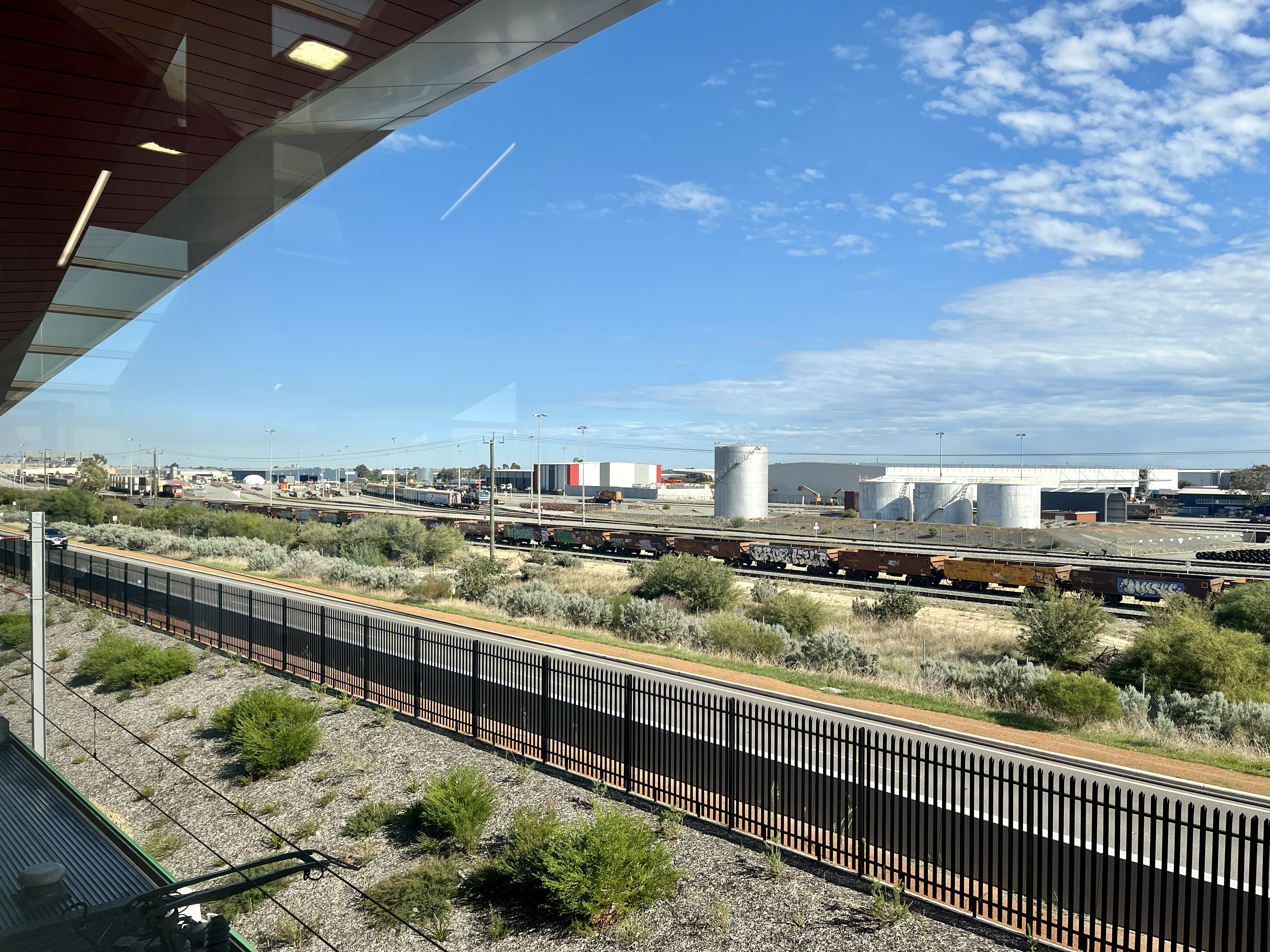
- Forrestfield Marshalling Yard from High Wycombe station in May 2023
- Interactive map of Forrestfield Marshalling Yard

Location
- Location: Forrestfield, Western Australia
- Coordinates: 31.956°S 115.990°E

Characteristics
- Owner: Arc Infrastructure
- Operator: Aurizon

History
- Opened: June 1973

Forrestfield Marshalling Yard is a marshalling yard in Forrestfield, Perth, Western Australia. Completed by the Western Australian Government Railways in 1973, it remains in use today in a diminished form.

== History ==
In December 1967 the Western Australian Government Railways commenced construction of a new marshalling yard on a 250-hectare (610-acre) site to replace Perth Marshalling Yard in Forrestfield off the Kwinana railway line. It has both narrow gauge and standard gauge sidings.

A four-storey control and administration centre was built by Sabemo.

In June 1969 an eight road locomotive depot built by Sabemo opened to replace East Perth Locomotive Depot. A wagon maintenance depot built by AVJennings opened in 1970.

In September 1970 a carriage servicing shed opened. It serviced stock for the Indian Pacific, Prospector and Trans-Australian. It closed in September 1998.

In June 1973 a hump yard was opened marking the completion of the project. The yard occupied 247 hectares (610 acres), with seven arrival, six departure, 31 classification and 10 secondary sorting sidings.

In 1998 a flyover previously used by trains heading south on the Kwinana and South Western lines that crossed over the yard was demolished. In 2000 the control centre was demolished. In 2000, 63 hectares (160 acres) of the yard was sold by LandCorp for warehouse distribution and freight related industries.
