= Kwinana freight railway =

Freight railway in Perth, Western Australia

Kwinana freight railway lines
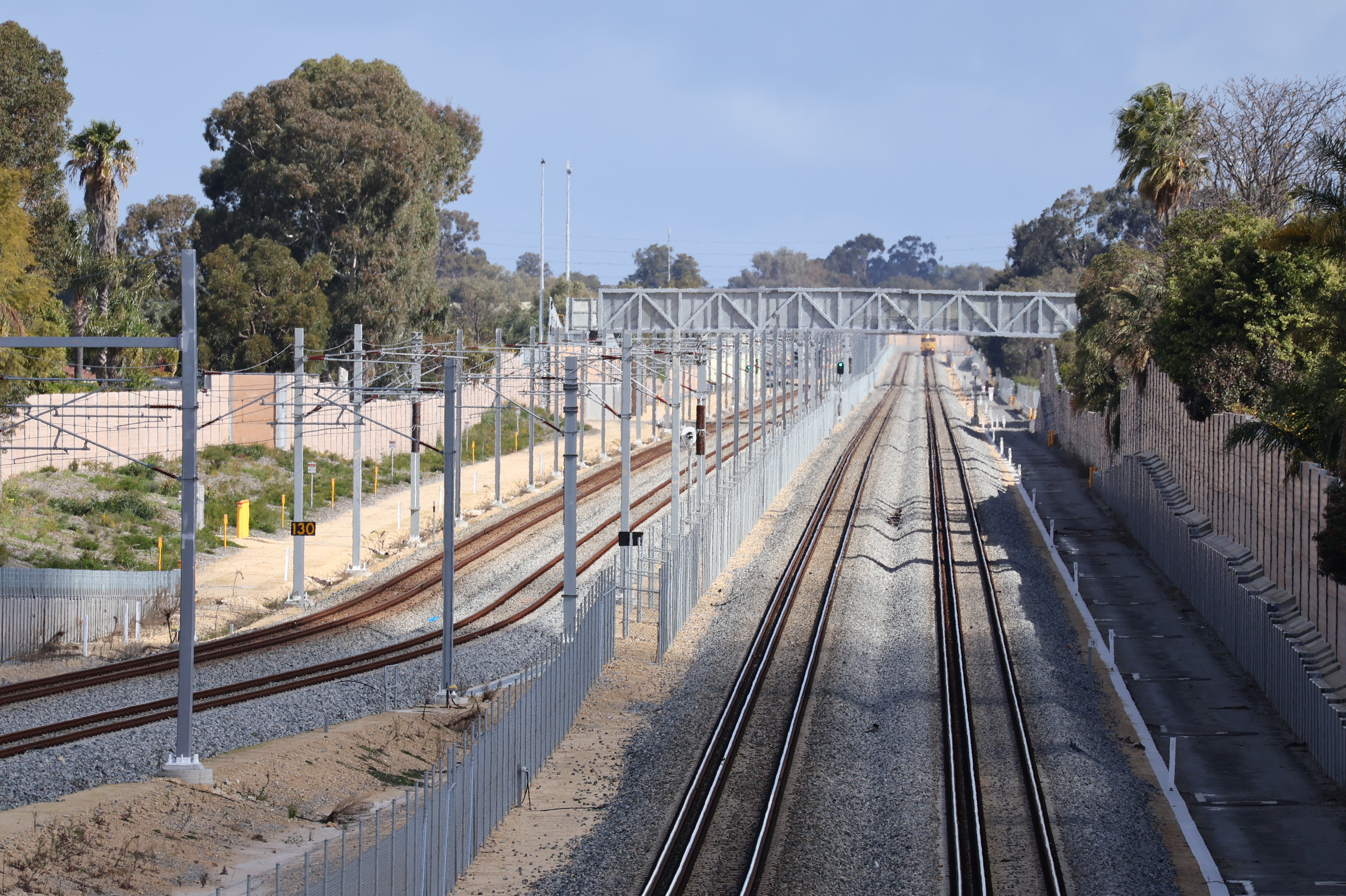
- The Kwinana freight railway (right) next to the Thornlie–Cockburn line (left)

Overview
- Owner: Arc Infrastructure (leased from the Public Transport Authority
- Locale: Perth, Western Australia
- Termini: Midland; Robbs Jetty, Mundijong Junction

Service
- Type: Freight rail

Technical
- Track gauge: 1,067 mm (3 ft 6 in); 1,435 mm (4 ft 8 1/2 in)

The Kwinana freight railway lines are a network of railways predominantly servicing the heavy industrial areas at Kwinana Beach south of Perth and to provide for the transport of freight servicing Fremantle Harbour, Kewdale Intermodal Facility and other freight destinations in Perth. While some lines were constructed in the 1900s, most of the network was constructed in the 1950s and 1960s.

Arc Infrastructure leases the majority of the network, with the exception of privately owned spur lines.

== Route components ==
The Kwinana and Forrestfield freight rail network comprises several sections of lines including sections which have now been closed, existing and proposed, which are described below.

=== Robb Jetty–Kwinana ===
After 1898 the Fremantle railway line terminated at Robb's Jetty in North Coogee. On 1 July 1903 the line was extended south along the coast to Coogee servicing Woodman Point. On 19 December 1955 the line was extended to Kwinana to provide a rail service to the Kwinana Oil Refinery.

During the late 1960's, the location name Robb's Jetty became Robb Jetty. This timing is consistent with the formation of government policy to remove all possessive apostrophes from formal place names.

The line was made redundant by the later construction of the freight line further east, and on 16 September 1973 the section between Coogee and Naval Base (north of the Alcoa refinery) was closed. The section between Robb Jetty and Coogee closed in February 1986.

=== Robb Jetty–Armadale ===
A line between Robb Jetty and Jandakot (including Spearwood) was opened in 1906, and the line was extended to Armadale in 1907 as a means of providing transport for agricultural goods in the Forrestdale area to Fremantle Harbour.

With the construction of a new railway line between Kewdale and Cockburn, the Jandakot to Armadale section closed on 23 January 1964, followed by Bibra Lake to Jandakot on 6 June 1966. The Spearwood to Bibra Lake section was retained to serve CBH Group and Elders Limited sidings until it too closed in 1991.

The section between Robb Jetty and Spearwood remains in use today.

=== Spearwood–Cockburn Cement ===
A branch line was constructed off the Robb Jetty–Armadale line at Spearwood to link with the Cockburn Cement plant in Munster in 1961.

The line now forms part of the main freight line between Kwinana and Fremantle.

=== Midland Junction–Kewdale–Welshpool ===
A freight railway was constructed between the Midland line west of the Midland Junction railway station and the Armadale line at Welshpool in 1957. The line provided access to the Kewdale Intermodal Facility - a major (if not the main) rail freight terminal in Perth.

The section between Kewdale and Welshpool is now closed. The rest of the line was replaced in 1968 by a new route to the east of the new Forrestfield Marshalling Yard.

=== Kewdale–Kwinana and the East–West Australia rail corridor ===
Prior to the 1960s, the majority of railways constructed in Western Australia were built at narrow gauge, with the exception of the standard gauge Trans-Australian Railway linking Western Australia with South Australia at Kalgoorlie. In 1961 the Western Australian Government passed the Railways (Standard Gauge) Construction Act 1961 to construct a standard gauge railway between Perth and Kalgoorlie to facilitate the movement of interstate freight.

The following new railways were constructed and existing railways upgraded to dual gauge, with construction complete by 3 August 1968

- The Midland Junction–Kewdale line was converted to dual gauge and then rerouted around the new Forrestfield Marshalling Yard.
- A new Kewdale–Kwinana line was constructed between Kewdale and the Spearwood–Cockburn Cement line at Cockburn, and the Cockburn Cement line extended south to intersect with the Robb Jetty–Kwinana line at Naval Base. A marshalling yard was constructed south of Rockingham Road.
- The Spearwood–Cockburn Cement line and Robb Jetty–Spearwood line was doubled by adding a standard gauge line alongside the existing narrow gauge, and continued north to Fremantle and the Leighton Marshalling Yard as a dual gauge line.
- The Robb Jetty–Coogee line to Woodman Point (now removed) remained narrow gauge only.
- The Kwinana loop rail was constructed at dual gauge.

The railways constructed and upgraded under the Railways (Standard Gauge) Construction Act 1961 form the backbone of the freight railway network in Perth.

=== Kenwick Intermodal Terminal ===
The Kenwick Intermodal Terminal was constructed in the early 2020's on the Kewdale-Kwinana line between Kewdale and the Armadale line flyover in Kenwick. It opened in September 2024 lifting the rail share capacity of import/export containers from 20% to as high as 50%.

=== Canning Vale ===
In the 1970's, a dual gauge siding was constructed from the Kewdale-Kwinana line at the rear of the Canning Vale Industrial Area to service the Swan Brewery and other industrial facilities. Although used frequently in the late 1970's and early 1980's, the line ended up being short-lived and was replaced by road transport by the late 1980's.

=== Kwinana Intermodal Terminal ===
In 2006 the government commenced an investigation for the development of an intermodal freight terminal in the Kwinana area, and in 2007 a preferred site was identified in the Latitude 32 industrial area at Hope Valley/Wattleup. Planning is progressing for the intermodal terminal.

=== Kwinana Bulk Terminal ===
The Kwinana Bulk Terminal (KBT), formerly known as the Kwinana Bulk Jetty, is a common-user bulk cargo facility located within Kwinana Port on Cockburn Sound. Constructed during the development of the Kwinana Industrial Area in the 1950s, the terminal was established to support the growing heavy industrial precinct and the State Government's post-war industrialisation programme. The facility was originally designed for the handling of imported and exported bulk commodities and remains a key component of Western Australia's industrial logistics infrastructure.

The terminal is connected to the Kwinana freight railway network by both standard and narrow-gauge rail infrastructure. Rail receival facilities at the site include bottom-dump unloading equipment linked to conveyors, stockyards and ship-loading systems, enabling the direct transfer of bulk commodities between trains and vessels. Commodities handled through the terminal have included iron ore, coal, cement clinker, gypsum, coke and slag, while liquid bulk exports such as liquefied petroleum gas are also accommodated.

Substantial upgrades undertaken during the late 2000s and early 2010s increased terminal throughput capacity and included reinstatement of rail infrastructure for standard-gauge rolling stock and modernisation of train unloading systems. The terminal continues to serve as a major bulk freight hub, including as Western Australia's only clinker import facility. Planning for a replacement terminal south of the existing facility is underway as the current infrastructure approaches the end of its operational life and projected capacity limits.

=== Kwinana Loop ===
The Kwinana Loop Railway branches from the main line at Kwinana first constructed under the Industrial Lands (Kwinana) Railway Act 1966 and later extended to the CBH Group terminal under the Kwinana Loop Railway Act 1968 with a balloon loop at the terminus. The southern portion has not been constructed, and access to the Loop Railway is reliant upon the triangle intersection at Kwinana.

The Department of Transport has identified the Kwinana triangle is now approaching capacity, and it is seeking alternatives in order to ensure that future growth in rail-hauled freight can be accommodated. Completion of the southern portion of the Kwinana Loop as planned, between the CBH balloon loop and the Kwinana–Mundijong line, is an option being considered.

In December 2015 the City of Rockingham publicised its objection to the reinstatement of the extension of the loop railway.

=== Kwinana–Mundijong ===
The Kwinana–Mundijong line was constructed to connect Kwinana with the South Western Railway. The line also extended to Jarrahdale and one of the main purposes of the line was to transport bauxite between Jarrahdale and Alcoa's Naval Base refinery.

The Kwinana–Mundijong line is one of the few narrow gauge only lines in the network.

=== Mundijong freight rail relocation ===
The Shire of Serpentine–Jarrahdale has adopted a structure plan for future urban in the Mundijong/Whitby district. The South Western Railway bisects the district, and one of the key components of the structure plan is the relocation of the freight rail along the western perimeter of the structure plan area. The relocation is intended to free up land for the construction of a new passenger rail terminus on the Armadale Line near the point where the Kwinana–Mundijong line joins the South Western Railway, servicing a proposed town centre at Whitby.

The relocated rail will run through the proposed West Mundijong Industrial Area, on the western side of the future Tonkin Highway alignment. There is a possibility an intermodal freight facility will be located along the relocated freight railway

=== Midland freight rail realignment ===
The possibility of realigning the Midland freight rail line was first identified in the Midland Revitalisation Charette held in 1997, as a means to reduce the impact of ‘wheel squeal’ for residents in the Woodbridge area. An alignment linking to the existing Eastern Railway east of Midland and joining the Midland Junction-Kewdale line south of Woodbridge has been identified.
