= Jandakot, Western Australia =

Jandakot
- Suburb
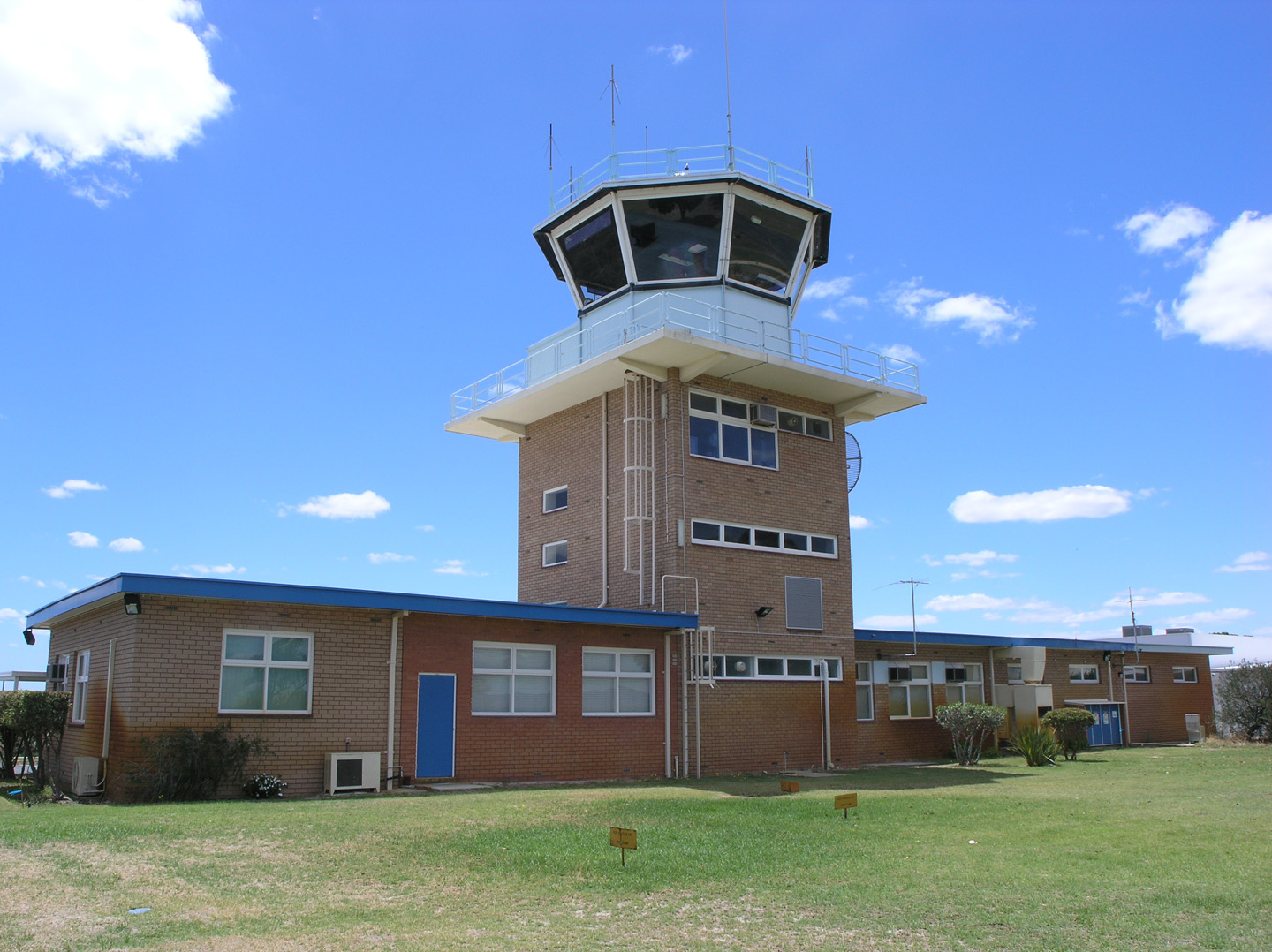
- Rear of air traffic control tower, 2006
- Interactive map of Jandakot
- Coordinates: 32°06′09″S 115°52′20″E
- Country: Australia
- State: Western Australia
- City: Perth
- LGA: City of Cockburn
- Location: 21 km (13 mi) from Perth

Government
  - State electorate: Jandakot
  - Federal division: Fremantle

Area
  - Total: 16.2 km^{2} (6.3 sq mi)

Population
  - Total: 2,533 (SAL 2021)
- Postcode: 6164
Suburbs around Jandakot
North Lake	Leeming	Canning Vale
Bibra Lake; South Lake	Jandakot	Treeby
Cockburn Central; Success	Atwell	Banjup

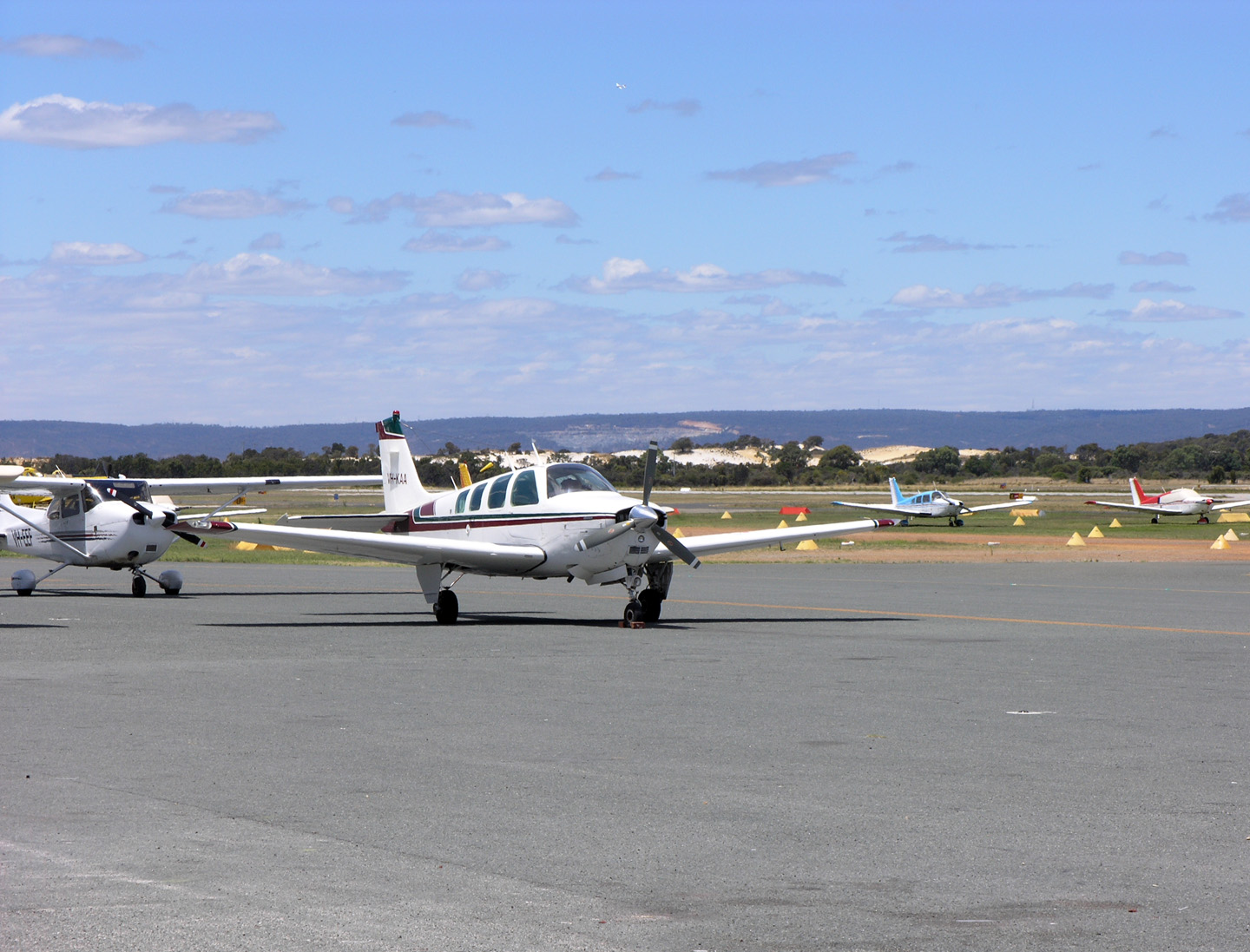
Light aircraft at Jandakot Airport, with the Darling Range in the distance.

Jandakot is a southern suburb of Perth, Western Australia, located within the City of Cockburn local government area. It is best known for Jandakot Airport that is situated entirely within the suburb, the airport being "the busiest general aviation airport in Australia in terms of aircraft movements", the sixth-busiest civilian airport in Australia in the fiscal year ending 30 June 2018, and in the 2011 fiscal year even the busiest civilian airport in Australia.

== History ==
Jandakot was originally named after Lake Jandakot, which was renamed lake Forrestdale in 1973. Maps of the Swan River Colony produced in the early 1830s show a lake of vast extent situated south west of Kelmscott. The name of the first European to find the lake remains unknown but, in February 1833, Surveyor-General Septimus Roe found the size of the lake had been greatly exaggerated. It became well known as a watering place on the original track between the Canning River and Pinjarra and in 1844 its Aboriginal name was recorded as Jandacot by surveyor J. W. Gregory, brother of Augustus Gregory. During subsequent years, the name was recorded variously as Jandicott, Jandakoot and Jandakott, but the spelling eventually adopted was Jandakot. The Aboriginal meaning of the word is said to be "place of the whistling eagle".

== Geography ==
It is bounded to the north by the Roe Highway, Kwinana Freeway to the west, Johnston Road to the east and to the south by Fraser Road, Jandakot Road, Solomon Road and Armadale Road. The northeastern boundary of the suburb is also the municipal boundary of the City of Melville and the eastern boundary is the municipal boundary of the City of Canning.

== Jandakot Airport ==
Jandakot is best known for Jandakot Airport located within it. Jandakot Airport serves pilot testing and domestic plane flights. It is the busiest secondary airport in Australia. A popular feature is the cafe that overlooks the runway. The airport was opened in 1963.

A land development company is keen to redevelop the land occupied by Jandakot Airport in exchange for a new airport more than 70 kilometres (43 mi) from many airport customers. In contrast to the tens of thousands of people now living in its vicinity, there is stiff opposition from the aviation community. The aforementioned land development company received a further setback in 2006 when the Minister for Transport wrote advising them that the airport was to be operated in its current location and in accordance with their lease from the Federal Government. This will include major re-development of the airside facilities including a new parallel 12/30 runway.

== Green hydrogen project ==
In 2018, the Australian Renewable Energy Agency (ARENA), an independent government agency, announced A$1.5 million in funding for Australia's first green hydrogen project, called the ATCO Hydrogen Microgrid, at Jandakot. The project involved a trial by ATCO to produce, store, and use renewable hydrogen to power a microgrid and assess the feasibility of a similar process on a larger scale. After solar energy has been used to separate hydrogen molecules from water, the hydrogen was captured and injected into a micro-grid system at the Clean Energy Innovation Hub (CEIH) at Jandakot. The total project cost was A$3.53m, with A$1.79m coming from ARENA, and the project was completed on 30 November 2019.

== Transport ==
=== Bus ===
- 233 Cockburn Central Station to Gosnells Station – serves Beeliar Drive and Armadale Road
- 515 Jandakot to Murdoch Station – serves Berrigan Drive
- 518 Cockburn Central Station to Murdoch TAFE – serves Beeliar Drive and Armadale Road
- 523 Cockburn Central Station to Treeby – serves Beeliar Drive and Armadale Road
- 527 Cockburn Central Station to Aubin Grove Station – serves Beeliar Drive and Armadale Road

=== Rail ===
- Mandurah Line
  - Cockburn Central Station

== Climate ==
Jandakot gets the comfortable climate of the Perth area with cool, wet winters and hot, dry summers. Summer temperatures can get as high as 45 °C (113 °F), winter weather gets mild temperatures around 15 °C (59 °F). Jandakot holds the record for the lowest temperature in the Perth metro area, of −3.4 °C (25.9 °F), and regularly drops below freezing in winter.

Climate data for Jandakot Airport
Month	Jan	Feb	Mar	Apr	May	Jun	Jul	Aug	Sep	Oct	Nov	Dec	Year
Record high °C (°F)	45.7 (114.3)	46.6 (115.9)	43.0 (109.4)	39.2 (102.6)	33.4 (92.1)	25.6 (78.1)	25.9 (78.6)	29.4 (84.9)	34.2 (93.6)	37.4 (99.3)	40.3 (104.5)	44.0 (111.2)	46.6 (115.9)
Mean maximum °C (°F)	40.3 (104.5)	40.2 (104.4)	38.5 (101.3)	33.5 (92.3)	28.2 (82.8)	23.7 (74.7)	22.3 (72.1)	24.0 (75.2)	26.9 (80.4)	32.2 (90.0)	36.6 (97.9)	39.2 (102.6)	42.0 (107.6)
Mean daily maximum °C (°F)	31.3 (88.3)	31.6 (88.9)	29.6 (85.3)	25.8 (78.4)	22.0 (71.6)	19.2 (66.6)	18.0 (64.4)	18.7 (65.7)	20.1 (68.2)	22.9 (73.2)	26.5 (79.7)	29.2 (84.6)	24.6 (76.3)
Mean daily minimum °C (°F)	16.8 (62.2)	17.2 (63.0)	15.6 (60.1)	12.5 (54.5)	9.3 (48.7)	7.6 (45.7)	6.9 (44.4)	7.2 (45.0)	8.2 (46.8)	9.8 (49.6)	12.7 (54.9)	14.8 (58.6)	11.6 (52.9)
Mean minimum °C (°F)	9.4 (48.9)	10.3 (50.5)	7.2 (45.0)	5.0 (41.0)	2.5 (36.5)	1.0 (33.8)	−0.1 (31.8)	0.8 (33.4)	1.6 (34.9)	3.0 (37.4)	5.8 (42.4)	7.9 (46.2)	−0.9 (30.4)
Record low °C (°F)	4.7 (40.5)	6.5 (43.7)	1.6 (34.9)	2.3 (36.1)	−0.6 (30.9)	−3.4 (25.9)	−2.8 (27.0)	−1.4 (29.5)	−1.3 (29.7)	−1.0 (30.2)	0.8 (33.4)	3.2 (37.8)	−3.4 (25.9)
Average rainfall mm (inches)	16.1 (0.63)	17.5 (0.69)	16.4 (0.65)	41.1 (1.62)	105.2 (4.14)	152.4 (6.00)	173.1 (6.81)	129.1 (5.08)	84.2 (3.31)	46.0 (1.81)	27.1 (1.07)	10.6 (0.42)	819.6 (32.27)
Average precipitation days	2.6	2.3	3.8	7.2	12.0	15.6	17.8	15.5	13.5	9.0	6.0	3.4	108.7
Average afternoon relative humidity (%) (at 15:00)	37	36	38	45	51	57	58	55	53	48	43	39	47
Source: Bureau of Meteorology; Temperatures: 1989–2020; Rain data: 1972–2020; Relative humidity: 1990–2010
