= Robbs Jetty railway station =

Former railway station in Western Australia

Robbs Jetty railway station was a railway station in Perth, Western Australia. Located south of Fremantle, it was active from 1902 to 1972.

== History ==
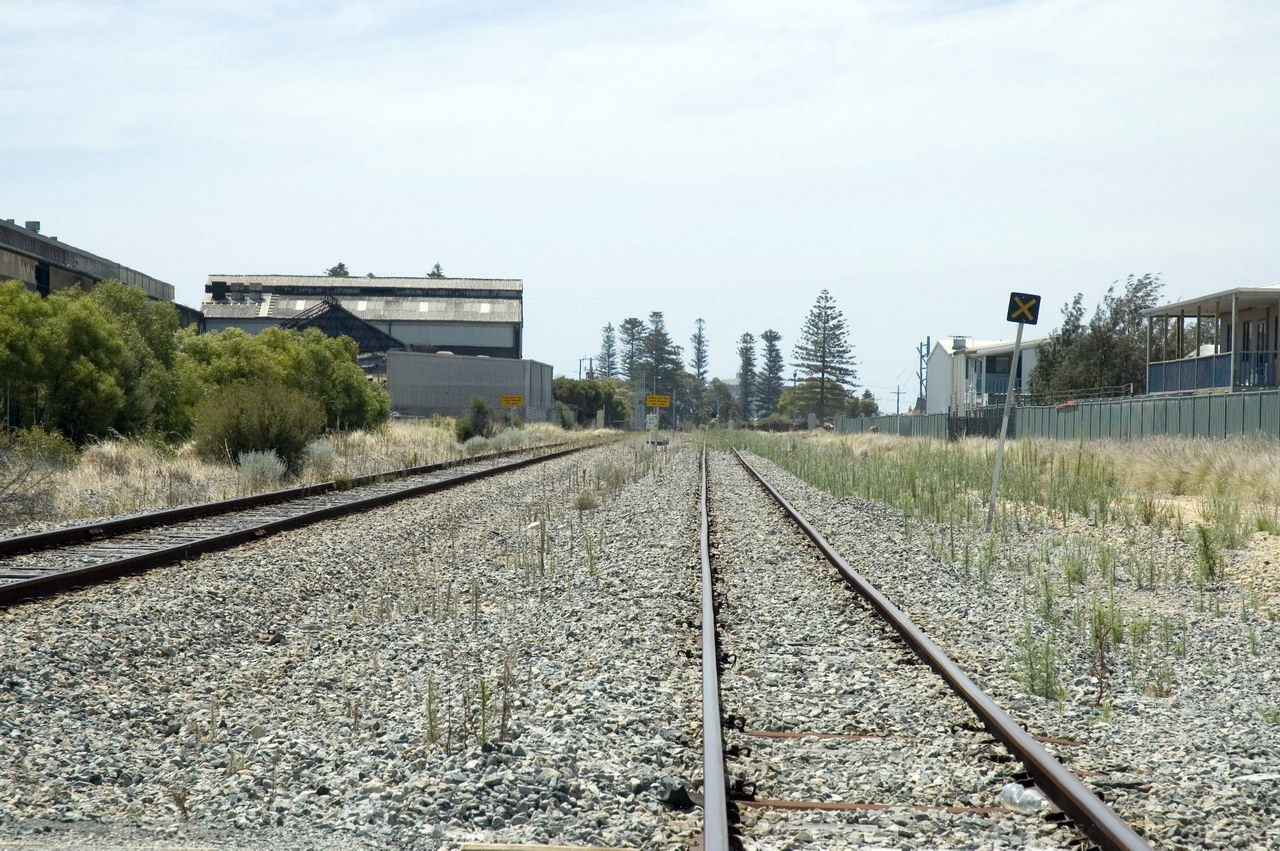
Area of former Robb Jetty Yard in February 2006

On 22 October 1898, the Fremantle line was extended south for 5 kilometres (3.1 mi) to Robbs Jetty. On 1 July 1903, the line was extended to Coogee. Initially the line was only served by freight trains; a passenger service began in 1913. The station was removed to make way for the Robb Jetty Yard in 1972.

Robbs Jetty station was near the Robbs Jetty Abattoir and South Fremantle Power Station.

Location of the Robb Jetty Yard

Robb Jetty Yard, a large dual gauge marshalling yard with a four-storey signal box tower, was built by the Western Australian Government Railways in the 1960s as part of the standard gauge project from Kalgoorlie to Leighton to serve local industries. With the closure of the power station in 1985 and the abattoir 1992, the yard was decommissioned and lifted. The site has been earmarked for residential redevelopment.
