= Cecil Rollo Payton Andrews =

Australian botanist (1870–1951)

Cecil Rollo Payton Andrews (2 February 1870 – 13 June 1951) was an English educator, botanist and collector who was born in London in 1870 and died in Surrey in 1951.

He was educated at Merchant Taylors' School and St John's College, Oxford and graduated with second-class honours in humanities and classics and in 1892 . He was then employed as a teacher from 1893 to 1896 and as a resident tutor at Battersea Teachers Training College.

Most of his adult working life was spent in Western Australia where he arrived in 1901 and was employed as the principal of Claremont Teachers College and later as the Director of Education and then as the Pro-Chancellor of the University of Western Australia. He returned to England sometime between 1929 and 1930.

During his time in Australia he collected and described several species of plant including some Acacias. Eucalypts and Pultenaea.

Cecil Andrews College in south-east suburban Perth is named after Andrews.
