= Mandurah railcar depot =

Transperth railway depot in Perth, Western Australia

- Interactive map of Mandurah railcar depot

Location
- Location: Rafferty Road, Mandurah
- Coordinates: 32.5200°S 115.7483°E

Characteristics
- Owner: Public Transport Authority
- Rolling stock: Transperth B-series & Transperth C-series
- Routes served: Mandurah and Yanchep

History
- Opened: 23 December 2007

Mandurah railcar depot is a Transperth railcar depot in the suburb of Mandurah. It is situated on Rafferty Road, southwest of the intersections of Mandurah Road, Kirkpatrick Drive and Mandjoogoordap Drive immediately north of the terminus of the Mandurah line.

== History ==
Mandurah railcar depot was constructed as part of the Mandurah line under the PTA's New Metrorail project and was opened along with the rest of the railway line on 23 December 2007. The depot is connected north of Mandurah station and is accessible by trains on both the up and down lines from the station via a series of crossovers.

== Function ==
The depot serves to stow and clean trains, with maininenance of Mandurah and Yanchep line trains occurring at Nowergup railway depot on the Yanchep line instead. The depot stows Transperth B-series and Transperth C-series train sets as Transperth A-series railcars are not used on the Mandurah or Yanchep lines. In recent months the new TransWA ADR/ADS railcars for the Australind route to Bunbury have used the depot during night test runs along the Mandurah Line The depot has capacity for up to 17 three-car train sets.
