= Mandurah line =

Suburban rail line in Perth, Western Australia

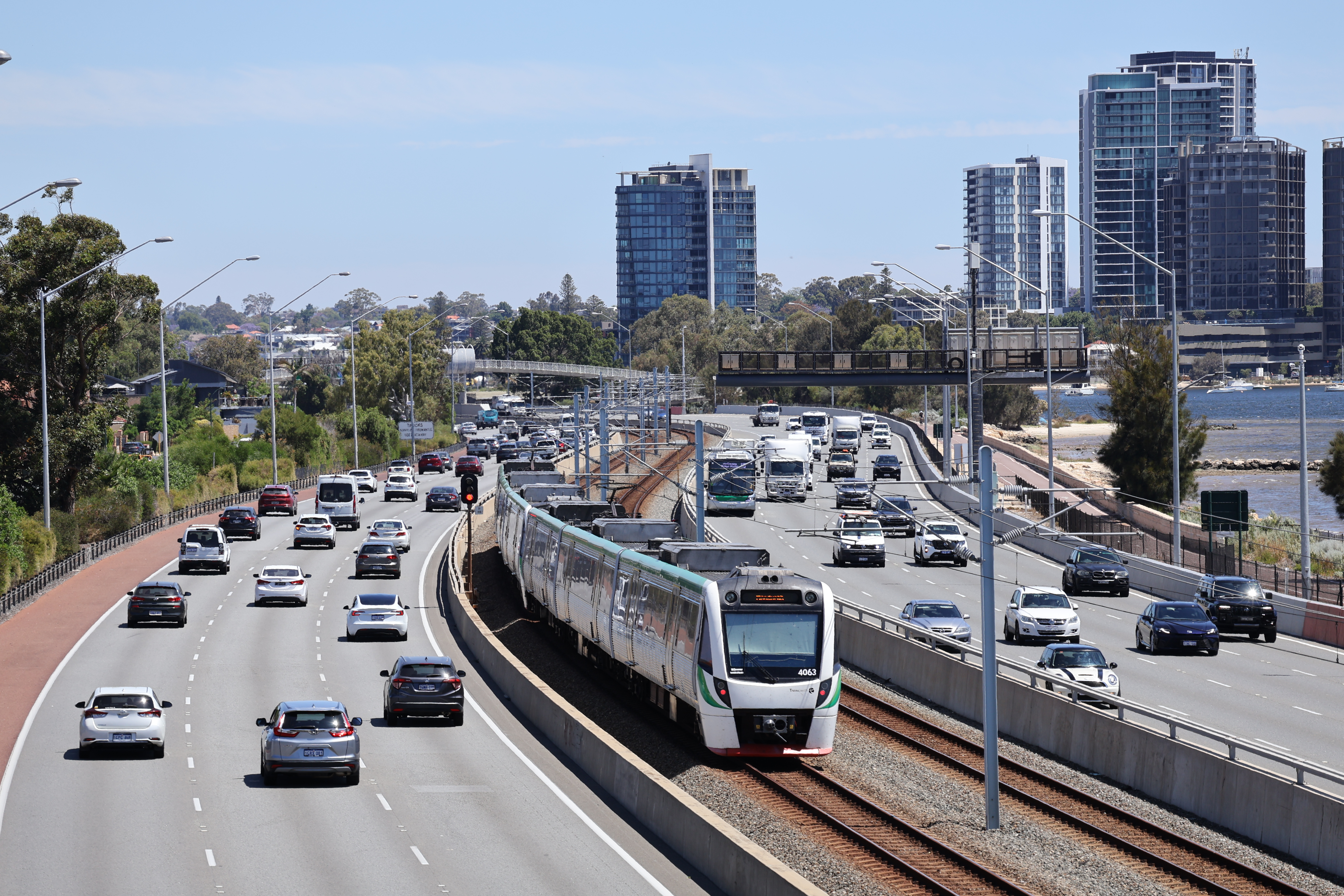
- A B-series train in the median strip of the Kwinana Freeway in Como

Overview
- Other names: South West Metropolitan Railway; Southern Suburbs Railway (during construction)
- Owner: Public Transport Authority
- Locale: Perth and Mandurah, Western Australia
- Termini: Perth Underground (north); Mandurah (south)
- Continues from: Yanchep line
- Stations: 13

Service
- Type: Suburban rail
- System: Transperth
- Operator: Public Transport Authority
- Depots: Mandurah; Nowergup
- Rolling stock: Transperth B-series trains; Transperth C-series trains
- Ridership: 23,728,644 (year to June 2026)

History
- Work began: 26 February 2004
- Opened: 23 December 2007

Technical
- Line length: 70.8 km (44.0 mi)
- Num of tracks: 2
- Character: At-grade and underground
- Track gauge: 1,067 mm (3 ft 6 in) narrow gauge
- Electrification: 25 kV 50 Hz AC from overhead catenary
- Operating speed: 130 km/h (81 mph)
- Signalling: Fixed block signalling
- Train protection system: Automatic train protection

The Mandurah line is a suburban railway line in Western Australia that links Perth's central business district (CBD) with Mandurah to the south. Operated by the state's Public Transport Authority (PTA) as part of the Transperth system, the Mandurah line is 70.8 kilometres (44.0 mi) long and has thirteen stations. The line operates as a through service with the Yanchep line to the north, and includes two stations in the William Street tunnel under the CBD. It continues south via the Kwinana Freeway's median strip, where five of its stations are located, then diverges from the freeway for the southernmost six stations in the cities of Kwinana, Rockingham and Mandurah.

Known during planning and construction as the Southern Suburbs Railway or the South West Metropolitan Railway, early planning for the line began in 1989 during planning for the Yanchep line. In 1994, a route branching off the Armadale line at Kenwick to follow the Kwinana freight railway and Kwinana Freeway was selected, but after the election of a Labor state government in 2001, the planned route was changed to go via a tunnel under the CBD. The Mandurah line, which was built as part of the New MetroRail project, was divided into eight contract packages. It was designed similarly to the Yanchep line, using widely spaced stations with bus interchanges and large park-and-rides.

Construction began in February 2004; it was disrupted by labour strikes and technical issues, particularly on the CBD tunnel section. Originally planned to open between Perth and Warnbro station in 2006 and between Warnbro and Mandurah in 2007, the tunnel opened on 15 October 2007 and the rest of the line opened on 23 December 2007. The total cost of New MetroRail was A$1.725 billion. Two infill stations have since opened: Aubin Grove in April 2017 and Lakelands in June 2023. In June 2025, the Thornlie line was extended to Cockburn Central station on the Mandurah line, completing the Kenwick route that was planned before 2001.

B-series and C-series trains are the main rolling stock used on the Mandurah line, and A-series trains were also formerly common. Trains run at a fifteen-minute headway during most times, reducing to as short as five-minutes in peak periods, when some services terminate at Cockburn Central. The travel time from Perth to Mandurah is 54 minutes. Initial patronage has significantly exceeded forecasts. The line recorded 23,728,644 boardings in the year to June 2026, making it the busiest Transperth railway line.

== History ==
=== Route selection ===
In February 1989, ahead of that year's state election, the Government of Western Australia announced it was investigating the construction of a railway line from Perth to Rockingham or Mandurah. At the time, planning was underway for the Northern Suburbs Railway, now known as the Yanchep line. Later that year, the South West Rapid Transit Study was formed; its steering committee consisted of representatives from the Department of Transport, the Main Roads Department, the Department of Planning and Urban Development, Transperth and Westrail. In 1990, the committee released a report outlining two route options: an extension of the Fremantle line or a branch off the Armadale line at Kenwick, both of which made use of freight rail corridors. The premier of Western Australia, Carmen Lawrence, announced in February 1992 the Fremantle option had been chosen. By this stage, bus rapid transit had been ruled out. The South West Area Transit (SWAT) Steering Committee was formed to consider rail-based alternatives, such as light rail. The section between Fremantle and Rockingham was scheduled to open in 1996, with the Rockingham-to-Mandurah section opening five years later. Legislation to build the railway was introduced to the Parliament of Western Australia later that year. By January 1993, the SWAT Steering Committee had recommended to government the rail line should be an extension of the existing network, and not light rail.

Independently of the SWAT Steering Committee, Westrail investigated a direct route from Perth to Mandurah via Thomsons Lake at the behest of the Department of Planning and Urban Development. The Kwinana Freeway's median strip south of the Narrows Bridge was considered too narrow compared to that of the Mitchell Freeway, where the Northern Suburbs Railway was constructed. An underground route from Perth to the Mount Henry Bridge was determined to cost about A$800 million, (Note: All currency totals are unadjusted for inflation.) which was considered too expensive.

Following the 1993 state election, the new Liberal government deferred the construction of the railway to Mandurah, but continued its planning. The Kenwick route became the preferred option because its travel time to Perth was shorter than that of the Fremantle route. The Kenwick route was reserved in the Metropolitan Region Scheme in December 1994. Ahead of the 1996 state election, Labor leader Geoff Gallop committed to building within four years a railway line from Fremantle to Rockingham that would be extended to Mandurah if Labor won a second term in government. Western Australia's Transport Minister Eric Charlton instead pledged the new line would branch off the Armadale line at Kenwick.

==== Kenwick route ====
In August 1997, the Liberal state government commissioned a master plan for the Kenwick route. The cabinet endorsed the South West Metropolitan Railway Master Plan and released it in March 1999. The plan outlined the route of the Mandurah line and its construction. The new track was to be 69 kilometres (43 mi) long; including existing track between Perth and Kenwick, the distance from Perth to Mandurah would have been 81.6 km (50.7 mi). Commencing at Kenwick, the railway would run parallel to the Kwinana freight railway until the Glen Iris estate in Jandakot, then south along the Kwinana Freeway's median strip to Kwinana, then southwest through Kwinana, Rockingham and Mandurah along the alignment reserved in the Metropolitan Region Scheme. Three options were given for the railway's route through Rockingham. The new line was forecast to cost, in total, $941 million, of which $629 million was for infrastructure and $312 million was for rolling stock. The line was planned to open as far as Thomsons Lake in 2005, with an extension to Rockingham and Mandurah opening in 2006. Two busways were built to supplement the railway; one along the Kwinana Freeway from Perth to the Murdoch Park 'n' Ride, and one from Fremantle to Rockingham.

Stations were planned at Thornlie, Nicholson Road, Canning Vale (later renamed Ranford Road), South Lake, Thomsons Lake (later renamed Cockburn Central), Thomas Road (later renamed Kwinana), Leda (later renamed Wellard), one or two stations in Rockingham, Waikiki (later renamed Warnbro), and Mandurah, with provision for additional intermediate stations in the future. Upgrades along the Armadale line would have been necessary due to short station spacing and level crossings. Lathlain and Welshpool stations were to be closed, and Carlisle and Victoria Park stations were to be rebuilt and relocated, in part to fill the gap left by the closure of Lathlain station. Perth, Oats Street, Queens Park and Beckenham stations were to be upgraded as well. Several road and pedestrian level crossings were to be grade separated. The new service was to operate as a through service with the Yanchep line, known at the time as the Joondalup line, (Note: The Joondalup line was renamed the Yanchep line on 15 June 2024.) due to the lines' similar levels of patronage, leaving the Armadale line to terminate at Perth station.

Proposed routes for the Mandurah line through Rockingham: the Rockingham city centre route (blue), the bypass route (green), and the route selected in the 2002 master plan (orange).

The master plan gave three options for the railway's route through Rockingham. Two options would run via Rockingham city centre, the first having a 2.25 km (1.40 mi) tunnel and the second having a 1.40 km (0.87 mi) tunnel, each with a station in the city centre and at Ennis Avenue. The third option would run along Rockingham's outskirts, bypassing the city centre, with one station at Dixon Road. The options were costed at $143 million, $107 million and $31 million, respectively. The City of Rockingham was strongly in favour of the first two options, but in the first two options, trains travelling through Rockingham would take another five minutes, and demand modelling projected similar patronage for all three options. Two weeks after the master plan was released, a task force was formed to meet with members of the Rockingham community and receive submissions. Out of nine thousand written submissions, 93 percent supported running the route through the city centre. In October 2000, the state government announced that a route through the Rockingham city centre had been chosen.

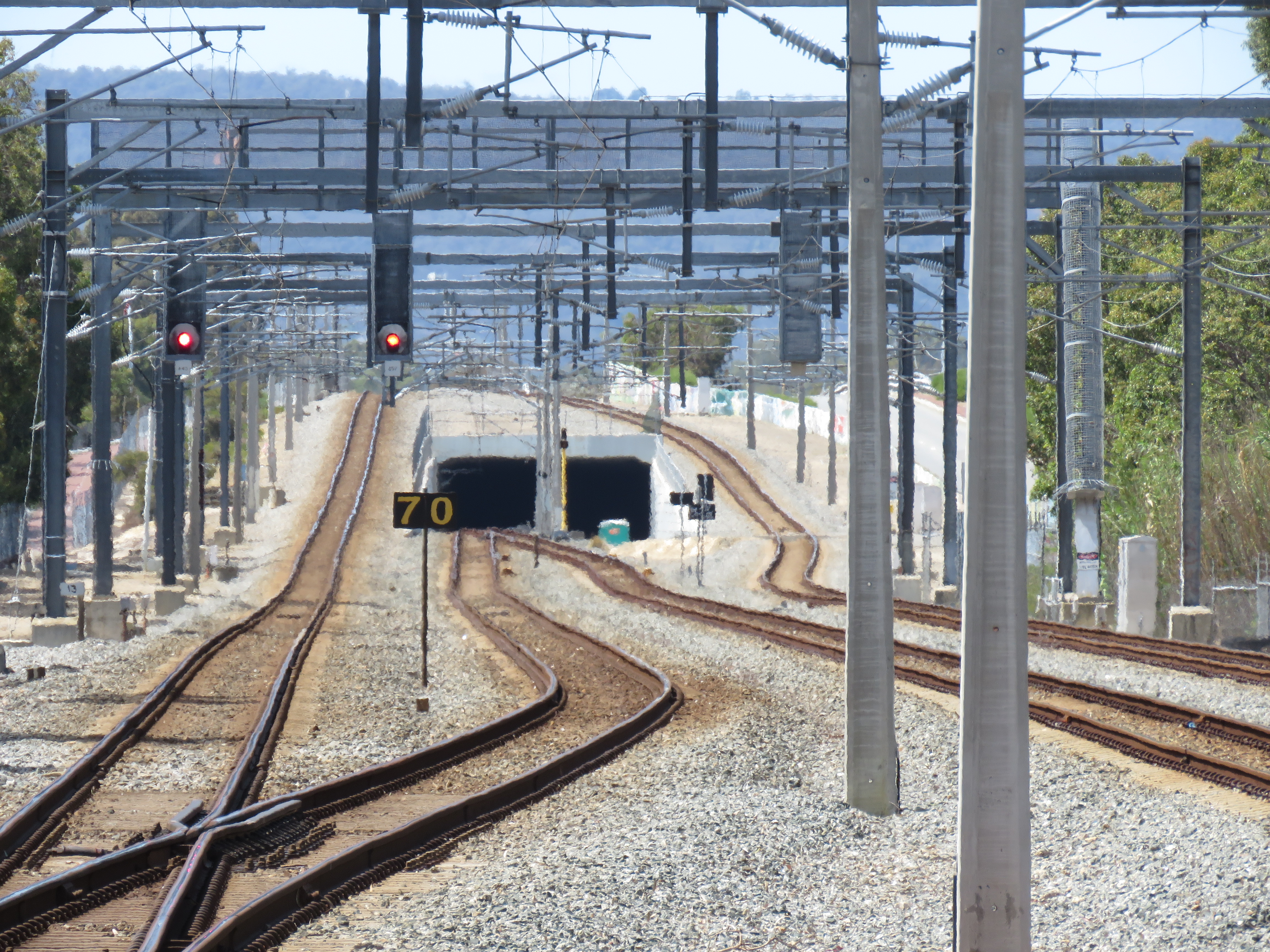
The Kenwick tunnel, which was used for the Thornlie line instead, after the direct route was selected.

Excluding Rockingham, three short tunnels were required for this route, which were constructed ahead of time. The two tunnels for the railway to enter and exit the Kwinana Freeway median strip, at Glen Iris and Anketell, were constructed for $30 million as part of a project to upgrade and extend the freeway. The northbound freeway carriageway between Kwinana and Jandakot was also moved 10 metres (33 ft) west to accommodate the railway line in the median strip. A tunnel was constructed in Kenwick as part of the extension of Roe Highway and the realignment of Albany Highway. Between Warnbro and Mandurah, the line was planned to have a single track, allowing a maximum of two trains per hour to Mandurah. The plan for that section was changed to double track in 2000 for an additional $20 million.

State Parliament passed the Railway (Northern and Southern Urban Extensions) Act 1999 in November 1999, authorising the construction of the railway to Mandurah, and the extension of the Joondalup line to Clarkson and Butler. A new master plan with revisions was released in April 2000, and in June 2000, the South West Metropolitan Railway project and the Joondalup line extension to Clarkson were merged into one project, known as the Perth Urban Rail Development Project. In October 2000, the funding arrangements were decided, allowing the planned opening date to be brought forward to 2004 for Kenwick to Thomsons Lake, and 2005 for the full line to Mandurah. The two projects combined were forecast to cost $1.1 billion, of which the privatisation of AlintaGas would provide $300 million, a railcar lease would provide $398 million, and the remaining $449 million would be funded by government debt.

==== Direct route ====
While in opposition, the Labor Party opposed the Kenwick route and wanted the railway to be an extension of the Fremantle line. Murdoch University professor and transport expert Peter Newman criticised the route for not going via Fremantle, but by 1999, had changed to advocating for a direct route along the Kwinana Freeway between Perth and Jandakot. By 2000, the Labor Party was in favour of the Kenwick route; the party did not want to appear too critical, according to the member of parliament (MP) for Rockingham, Mark McGowan. The Department of Transport opposed the direct route, saying it would require the closure of the Kwinana Freeway bus lanes and serve a lower population than the Kenwick route. The following year, Labor was elected to state government, and in July 2001, the new Cabinet approved a change from the Kenwick route to the direct route along the Kwinana Freeway. This direct route involved a tunnel to bring the line through the central business district (CBD). The route's main advantage was that it made for a shorter, more direct journey from Mandurah to Perth, reducing the journey time by twelve minutes. It also allowed for stations near Murdoch University and at the southern side of the Perth CBD, but was more expensive, requiring parts of the original plan to be cut. To make use of the already-constructed Kenwick tunnel, the Thornlie line was to be built as a one-station spur off the Armadale line. The Mandurah line's opening date was postponed for a year, but the government committed to not exceeding the cost of the Kenwick route.

The master plan for the new route was released in August 2002. There were to be stations at William Street (later renamed Perth Underground), Esplanade (later renamed Elizabeth Quay), (Note: Esplanade station was renamed Elizabeth Quay station on 31 January 2016.) Canning Bridge, Leach Highway (later renamed Bull Creek), South Street (later renamed Murdoch), Thomsons Lake (later renamed Cockburn Central), Thomas Road (later renamed Kwinana), Rockingham, Waikiki (later renamed Warnbro), and Mandurah. (Note: The stations between Canning Bridge and Mandurah adopted their current name by the time contracts were awarded for their construction in 2004 and 2005. Perth Underground station adopted its current name before opening in 2007.) South Lake station at Berrigan Drive was removed to save $6 million. Leda station was funded but not initially planned for construction due to the lack of nearby suburban development; the station, now known as Wellard, was later brought forward to be constructed with the rest of the line. Planned upgrades to the Armadale line between Perth and Kenwick were scaled back. The section from Perth to Waikiki was planned to open in December 2006, and the section between Waikiki and Mandurah was planned to open the following December.

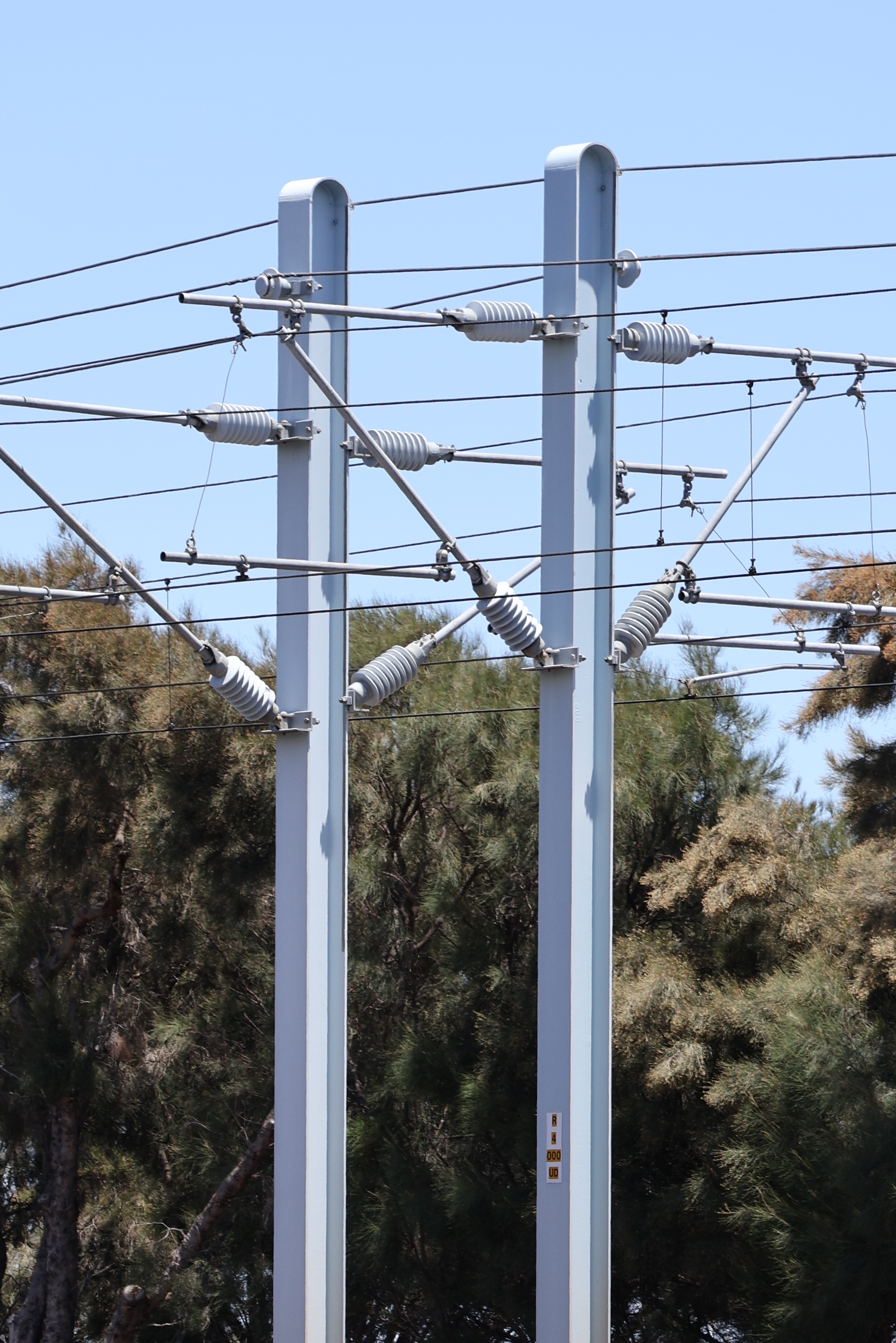
Blue poles in South Perth

The direct route received criticism from several sources. Residents of South Perth complained the railway would be an eyesore and encroach on the Royal Perth Golf Club. The local MP, Phillip Pendal, and former transport minister Julian Grill called for the railway and freeway to be put underground between the Narrows Bridge and Mount Henry Bridge; the minister for planning and infrastructure, Alannah MacTiernan, said doing so would cost $500 million, and that the ground-level option would have minimal aesthetic impact because it would be in the middle of a freeway. Use of a third rail instead of overhead lines in South Perth was considered but ruled out due to cost, operational reasons, safety and aesthetics. In response to community concerns, the poles for the overhead lines in South Perth were painted blue and made of steel rather than concrete, allowing them to be slim.

To ensure costs remained within that of the Kenwick route, the diversion through the Rockingham city centre was cancelled, resulting in criticism from the mayor of Rockingham, Chris Elliott. Rockingham station was relocated to the intersection of Ennis Avenue and Rae Road by using a corridor reserved for the unbuilt Garden Island Highway; this was closer to the Rockingham city centre than the 1999 master plan's bypass route. The Rockingham City Centre Transit System was proposed to link the station to the Rockingham city centre and foreshore. Guided buses and light rail were considered, and in 2004, a bus service running partially along a dedicated transitway was chosen. The cancellation of stage two of the Kwinana Freeway Bus Transitway, (Note: Stage one of the Kwinana Freeway Bus Transitway, from the Narrows Bridge to Canning Bridge, was already under construction and would open in February 2002.) a reduction in railcars required for the shorter route, and a downscaling of the Armadale line and Perth station upgrades also helped ensure the direct route could remain within the costs of the Kenwick route. The plan to lease the railcars was also cancelled because it would have been more expensive in the long term. A new budget of $1.4 billion was approved for the entire Perth Urban Rail Development Project, taking into account the Southern Suburbs Railway, extension to Clarkson, and Thornlie line.

=== Construction ===
The Perth Urban Rail Development Project was renamed New MetroRail in March 2003. Construction of the Southern Suburbs Railway was divided into eight contract packages; this allowed for works on the freeway and bridges to begin before other parts of the project were finalised, and for the awarding of contracts to smaller businesses. With the exception of Package E, which was managed by Main Roads Western Australia, the packages were managed by New MetroRail, now a division of the Public Transport Authority (PTA). The eight packages were:

List of contract packages
Package	Original value	Scope
A	$310 million	Drainage, earthworks, tracks and the overhead line equipment from Mandurah to the Narrows Bridge; Roadworks, bridges, and underpasses from Mandurah to Glen Iris; Signalling and communications for the entire line; Mandurah railcar depot
B	$32 million	Cockburn Central, Kwinana, and Wellard stations
C	$38 million	Rockingham, Warnbro and Mandurah stations
D	$32 million	Canning Bridge, Bull Creek, and Murdoch stations
E	$105 million	Roadworks along the Kwinana Freeway, including new bridges, barriers, and modification of the existing bridges
F	$324.5 million	Tunnelling, Perth Underground station, Esplanade station and the connection to the rest of the rail network
G	$10.6 million	New train control system
H	—	Various minor works

State Parliament passed the Railway (Jandakot to Perth) Act 2002 in November 2002 to authorise the Jandakot to Perth section. To secure the support of the Greens and defeat an opposition motion for the bill to be sent to a parliamentary committee, the government committed to building South Perth station by 2010. Public comments for the environmental review began soon thereafter. The Environmental Protection Authority recommended to the minister for the environment that the South West Metropolitan Railway be approved. The minister, Judy Edwards, approved the project in November 2003. As part of the environmental approval, fauna underpasses were required to be built within Leda Nature Reserve and Rockingham Lakes Regional Park.

==== Tunnelling ====
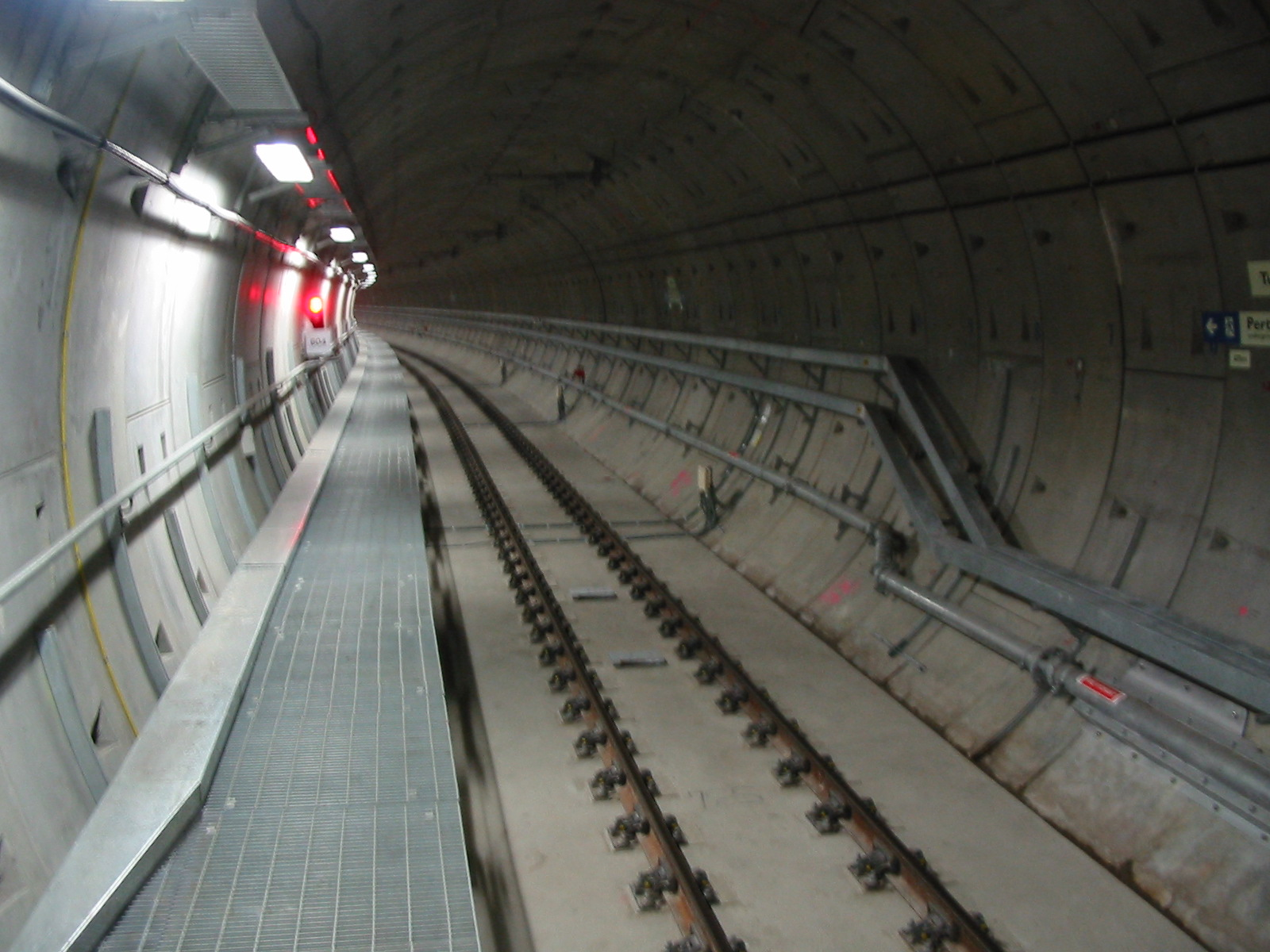
The William Street tunnel north of Elizabeth Quay station, known before 2016 as Esplanade station

In October 2001, the Perth City Rail Advisory Committee was formed in response to controversy over the route through Perth's CBD. The committee released its report in March 2002, detailing three main route options: a western route via the Mitchell Freeway, a central route via a tunnel under William Street and an eastern route via a longer tunnel further east. The committee recommended the eastern route but the government ruled that out due to its cost. The committee was re-established to reconsider the two remaining route options in more detail. In May, it recommended the William Street route, which was approved by Cabinet in June. Expressions of interest for Package F, which was expected to cost $200 million, were called for in March 2003. Five consortia submitted expressions of interest, and in May 2003, CityConnect (Clough–McConnell Dowell–Obayashi) and Leighton–Kumagai Gumi were shortlisted. In November that year, Leighton–Kumagai Gumi was selected; the contract was signed in February 2004 for $324.5 million.

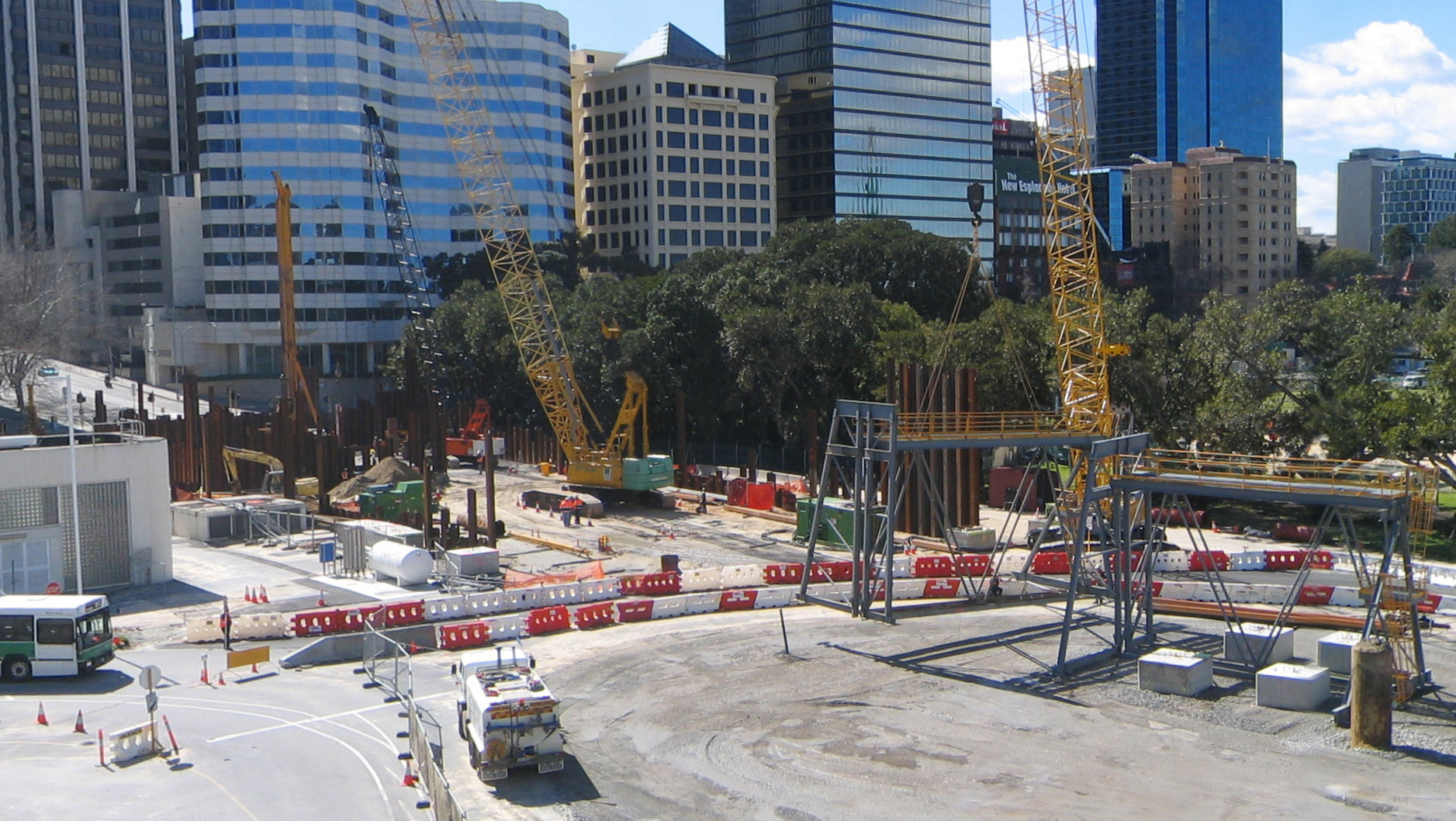
Construction work at the Esplanade station site, February 2005

On 26 February 2004, a ceremony was held to mark the start of preliminary drilling and surveying, which was the first physical work done for the Southern Suburbs Railway. Demolition of buildings to make way for William Street station began in April 2004. Technical issues with the tunnel boring machine (TBM) delayed the start of tunneling. Tunnelling from Esplanade station began on 25 October 2005. Initially expected to reach William Street station before Christmas, the first phase of tunnelling was delayed by technical issues and industrial action, which led to the Australian Industrial Relations Commission issuing a strike ban for the remainder of the project in December 2005. Over 400 workers struck for twelve days in February and March 2006. Tunnelling was also paused for several weeks in April and May 2006 because of a dispute between the contractors and the PTA regarding insurance. The TBM broke through into William Street station on 7 February 2006. It was relaunched heading north on 4 May, reaching the Roe Street dive structure on 3 June. The TBM was launched from Esplanade station for the second time on 19 July, and reached William Street station on the night of 30–31 August. It was relaunched on 22 September and reached the Roe Street dive structure on 24 October 2006, marking the end of tunnelling.

107 workers were prosecuted for violating the strike ban, of which eighty-seven were fined up to $10,000. Leighton filed several writs against the PTA in the Supreme Court of Western Australia regarding a dispute over the contract's rise-and-fall provisions, the cost of disposing of contaminated soil, an extension of the practical completion deadline, and the cost of dewatering. All legal action ended with a settlement in May 2009, bringing the total cost of the City Project to $439.3 million, excluding legal fees. Leighton also reached two settlements, worth millions of dollars, with the Construction, Forestry and Maritime Employees Union.

==== Kwinana Freeway roadworks ====
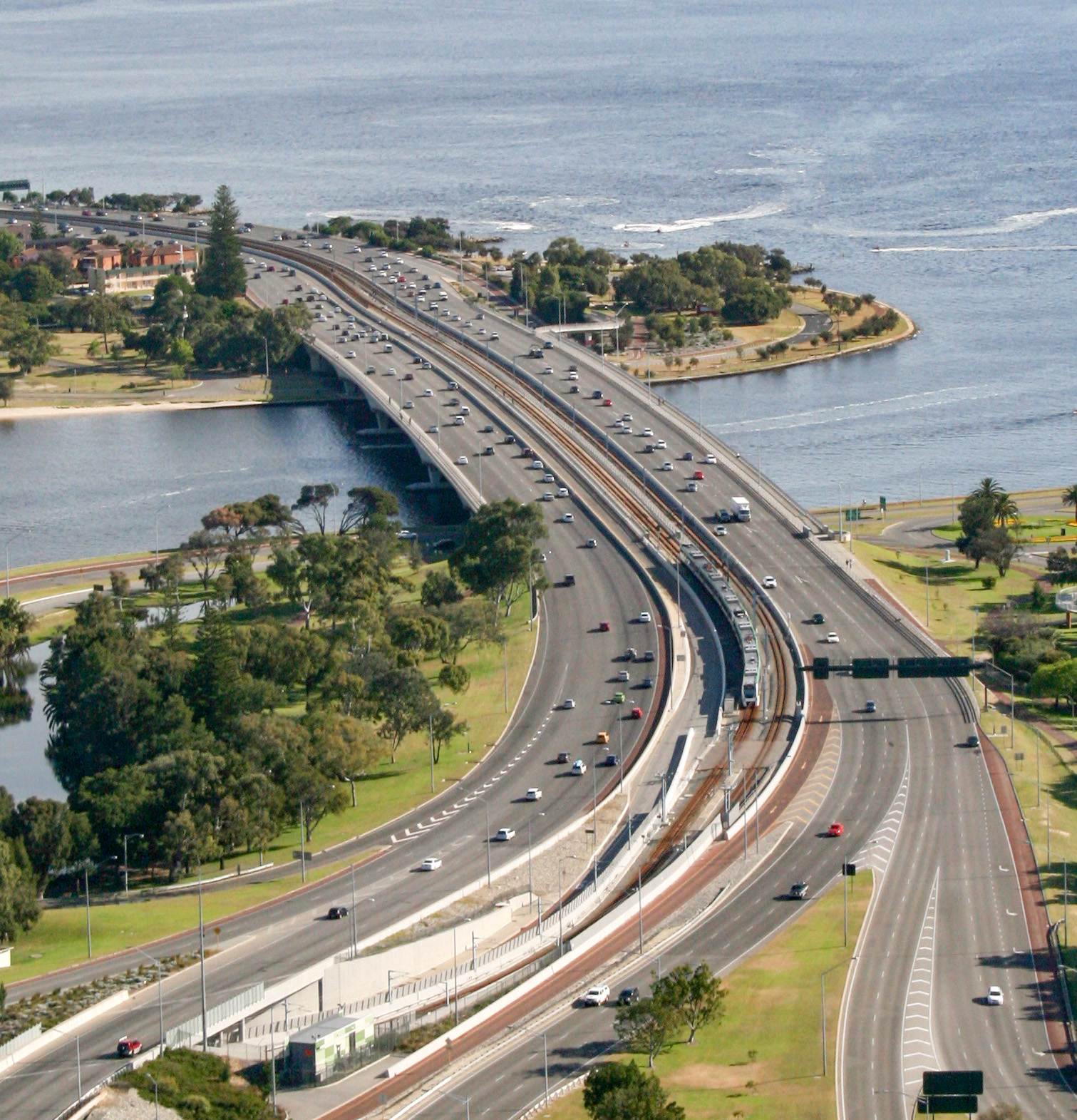
The three parallel Narrows Bridges photographed in 2013

Package E was for alterations to the Kwinana Freeway between the CBD and Glen Iris. This included upgrades to the Narrows and Mount Henry Bridges, earthworks for Bull Creek and Murdoch stations, the realignment and reconstruction of the freeway ramps and intersections at Leach Highway and South Street, a replacement bus on-ramp at Canning Bridge station, and a realignment of the freeway carriageways. Work was not required south of Glen Iris; this had already been done as part of the previous Kwinana Freeway upgrade. By May 2003, two consortia had been shortlisted: Leighton Contractors, and a joint venture between Thiess and Barclay Mowlem. Because Thiess was a subsidiary of Leighton, concerns about a lack of competition in the tender process were raised, but MacTiernan said a lack of competent contractors left the government with no choice but to accept the bids. Leighton was selected in October 2003 and the contract was signed in January 2004 for $99 million. (Note: A later source reported the cost of Package E was $105 million.)

Before the Mandurah line was built, the Narrows Bridge, which crosses the Swan River, consisted of two parallel bridges with bus lanes as the innermost lane of each bridge. The recently built northbound bridge was able to carry the northbound Mandurah line track with only minor strengthening, but the older southbound bridge was too weak and did not have enough room for the southbound track, so a new bridge for the southbound track was built in between the two bridges. The new bridge was built using precast concrete beams that were craned into position. The first four beams were lifted into place by October 2005, and the bridge was completed by April 2006. The original plan for the Mount Henry Bridge, which crosses the Canning River, was the addition of extra lanes to both its west and east sides, and for the Mandurah line to run across the middle. Leighton proposed to construct a single bridge on the western side instead, saving $17 million. Construction at the Mount Henry Bridge began in May 2004. The new bridge is 15 m (49 ft) wide and 660 m (2,170 ft) long, and was constructed using the incremental launch method. It opened on 22–23 January 2006, allowing work on the rail corridor to begin on the original bridge. To enable the Mandurah line to exit the freeway and enter the William Street tunnel, a bridge was built for the southbound carriageway of the Mitchell Freeway. This was built from the top down, allowing three lanes to remain open at all times. Package E was completed in June 2006.

==== Railway construction ====
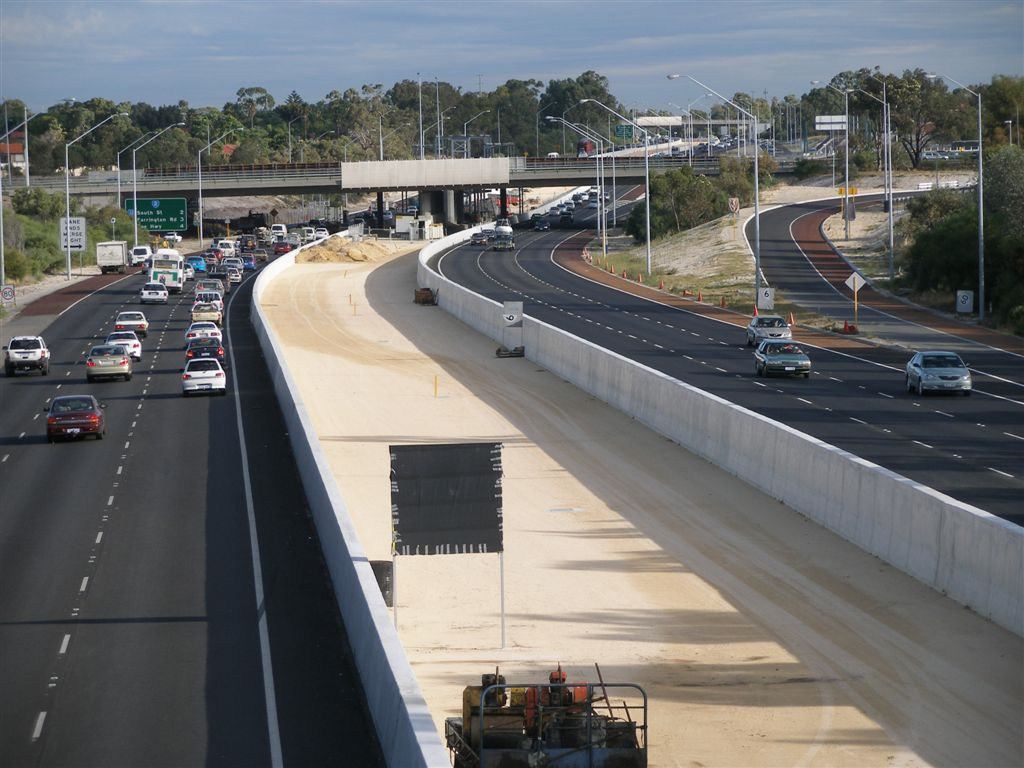
View from Cranford Avenue, April 2006

Package A involved civil works, drainage, construction of track and overhead line equipment, as well as earthworks for stations between Cockburn Central and Mandurah. By May 2003, four consortia had qualified to tender for Package A: ConnectWest (Queensland Rail and BGC Contracting); Leighton Downer MVM (Leighton Contractors, Works Infrastructure and MVM Rail); RailLink Joint Venture (John Holland, Macmahon Contractors and Multiplex Constructions); and Thiess Barclay Mowlem (Thiess and Barclay Mowlem). As well as Package E, concerns about a lack of competition were raised for Package A, because John Holland and Thiess were subsidiaries of Leighton Contractors, meaning three of the four bids involved Leighton. After ConnectWest withdrew during the tender period, the RailLink Joint Venture was selected in December 2003 and awarded the contract in May 2004 for $310 million.

External image
- Track laying machine north of Bull Creek station, September 2006 via Flickr

Tracklaying began on 16 March 2006, starting from a temporary depot in Hillman. For the most part, a tracklaying machine that could lay 1 km (0.6 mi) of track per day was used. The machine started by laying track north from Hillman to Roe Highway, then south from Hillman to Gordon Road in Mandurah, then north from Roe Highway to the Narrows Bridge. The machine did not lay any track south of Gordon Road as the Gordon Road bridge was not completed until later in the project and it was deemed not worth it to turn the machine around a third time. By the end of 2006, track laying was complete. Because of a delay caused by the late completion of other packages, the PTA reached a $21.8 million settlement with RailLink in June 2006. By April 2007, the completion of Package A was further delayed by problems with the installation of signalling, which by August that year was the main issue delaying the opening of the Mandurah line.

==== Station construction ====
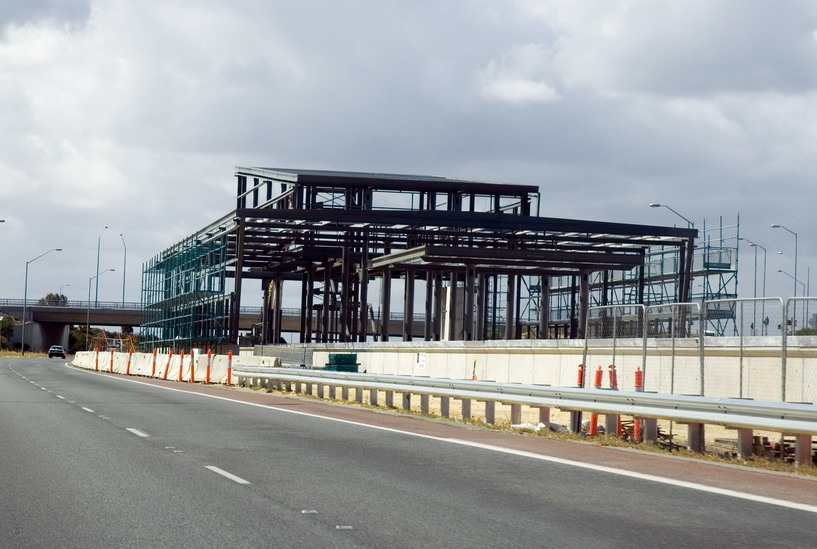
Cockburn Central station under construction in December 2005

The nine stations between Canning Bridge and Mandurah were grouped into three packages. In September 2003, the state government called for expressions of interest for the three station packages. The Package D contract, which was for Canning Bridge, Bull Creek and Murdoch stations, was awarded to John Holland for $32 million in November 2004. In March 2005, the Package B contract, which was for Cockburn Central, Kwinana and Wellard stations, was awarded to a joint venture between DORIC Constructions and Brierty Contractors for $32 million. Package C was divided into two contracts, which were awarded in June 2005 for a total of $38 million. The contract for Rockingham and Warnbro stations was awarded to the DORIC–Brierty Joint Venture, and the contract for Mandurah station was awarded to JM and ED Moore.

By the end of 2005, construction had begun on most stations. All stations between Canning Bridge and Mandurah reached practical completion in the first half of 2007: Cockburn Central, Kwinana, Wellard and Mandurah stations in January or February, Rockingham and Warnbro stations in March or April, and Canning Bridge, Bull Creek and Murdoch stations in June.

==== Train control system and depot ====
Package G was for a new train control system for the Southern Suburbs Railway and the existing network, which used a system installed in 1989. The Package G contract was awarded to Union Switch & Signal for $10.6 million in July 2003. The new system was launched on 4 July 2005. Package H was for minor works for the integration of the Mandurah line with the rest of the network, such as modifications to the power distribution system in the Perth CBD area. EDI Rail and Bombardier Transportation built Nowergup railcar depot on the Joondalup line as part of the contract to construct the B-series trains. The depot opened on 13 June 2004.

==== Cost escalations and opening ====
The 2002 master plan gave an expected opening of 2006 for the line between Perth and Warnbro, and 2007 for Warnbro to Mandurah. When the first contracts were approved in December 2003, the completion date for the whole line was brought forward to December 2006. In April 2005, MacTiernan said the Southern Suburbs Railway would be completed on time and on budget, despite the ongoing industrial problems. Later that month, she said the opening had been delayed from December 2006 to April 2007 because of delays on the City Project as a result of heritage protection works at Perth Underground station, engineering challenges on the foreshore, and industrial disputes, which also delayed Package A's tracklaying. A $45 million escalation in the project's budget contingency was also announced because the last two station contracts cost more than expected. In April 2006, a further postponement to July 2007 was announced, along with a $50 million escalation in the budget contingency due to claims made by Leighton–Kumagai and RailLink. The May 2006 state budget revealed the Mandurah line's debt would be fully paid off using a budget surplus.

In May 2007, it was announced the July opening date would not be met and that the new opening date was unknown. In June 2007, a completion deadline of that year's November was given. Another $50 million cost escalation was revealed in September 2007, bringing the total cost of New MetroRail to $1.66 billion, of which $1.103 billion was for the Mandurah line. (Note: The rest of the $1.66 billion was for the Thornlie line, Clarkson extension, Nowergup depot, and B-series railcars. The media reported the $1.66 billion figure as the cost of the Mandurah line, not the cost of New MetroRail as a whole.) The 2009–10 and the 2010–11 state budgets revealed further cost increases, making the final cost of New MetroRail $1.725 billion. The Mandurah line's construction cost was substantially lower than that of other comparable Australian rail projects. For example, a 2011 New South Wales parliamentary inquiry noted that Sydney's South West Rail Link was estimated to cost almost ten times more per kilometre than the Mandurah line, and a 2010 paper by Paul Mees showed that Melbourne's Regional Rail Link cost more than three times the Mandurah line, despite its smaller scope.

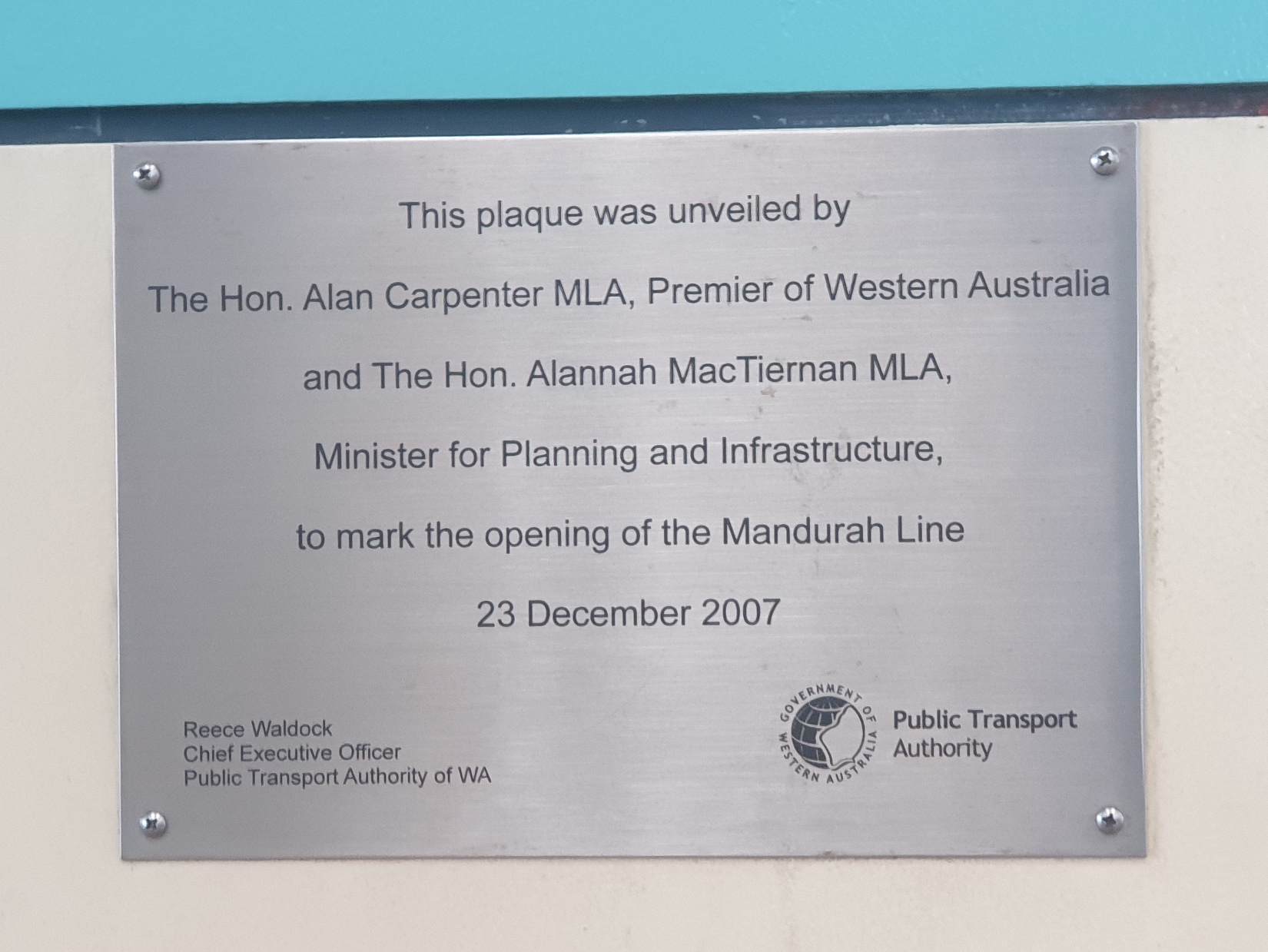
Plaque at Mandurah station commemorating the opening of the Mandurah line on 23 December 2007

The first train ran through the William Street tunnel in August 2007. The City Project reached practical completion in September 2007 and was handed to the PTA on 10 September. From 7–14 October, the Fremantle line was fully closed and the Joondalup line was closed south of Leederville station so the William Street tunnel's tracks, signalling, electrical and communications systems could be connected to the rest of the network. Perth Underground and Esplanade stations opened on 15 October 2007.

Power for the whole line was first switched on in September 2007. The first train south of the Narrows Bridge, a test train running between Perth and Rockingham, ran on 9 November 2007. The success of the test train allowed for the announcement of the line's opening date of 23 December 2007 the following day. Driver training was scheduled to begin on 19 November. A public ballot was held for people to win a ticket to ride the inaugural train. Premier Alan Carpenter and the minister for planning and infrastructure, Alannah MacTiernan, opened the line on 23 December.

=== After opening ===
Within weeks of the line opening, parking at several stations was at capacity, causing many people to park illegally. In March 2008, the government acknowledged the car parks were full, and said it was considering expanding them and adding more bicycle storage facilities. In September 2008, the Liberal Party committed $49 million to adding 3,000 new parking bays along the Mandurah and Joondalup lines, and Labor committed to adding 2,000 bays. The first new parking bays were opened at Murdoch station in July 2009. By July 2012, the 3,000-parking-bay promise had been exceeded.

==== Infill stations ====
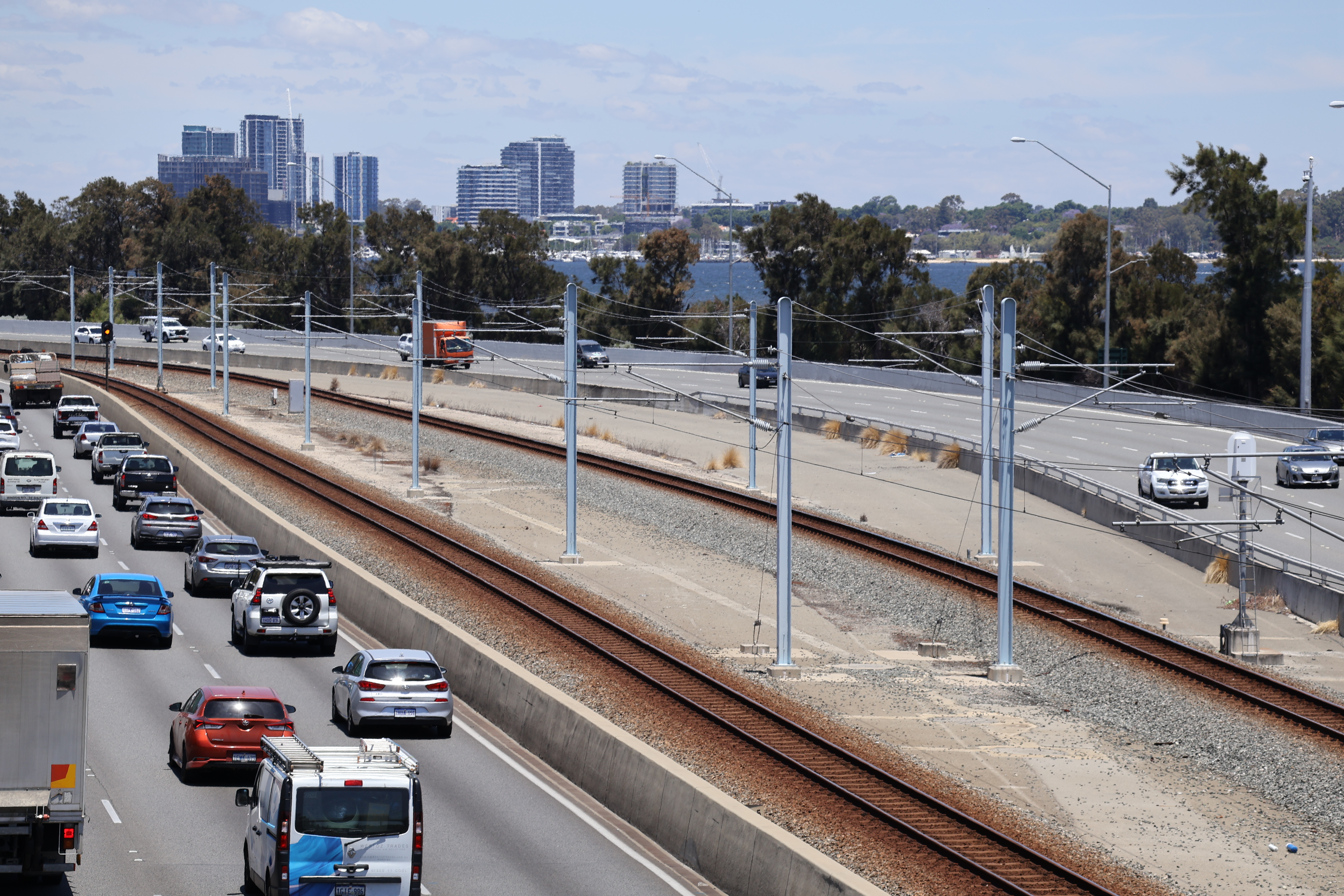
The site of the proposed South Perth station

Provisions were made for infill stations at South Perth, Berrigan Drive, Russell Road / Gibbs Road, Rowley Road, Anketell Road, Challenger Avenue, Stakehill Road, Paganoni Road, Lakelands, and Gordon Road. The 2002 master plan justified not building South Perth station with the rest of the Mandurah line as the station would receive low patronage because the existing bus and ferry services were attractive, and there was little opportunity to provide car parking. Later that year, to receive the support of the Greens in passing the Railway (Jandakot to Perth) Bill, the government committed to constructing the station by 2010. During the Mandurah line's construction, the southbound freeway carriageway was relocated in the vicinity of Richardson Street to create room for South Perth station. In 2008, the PTA deferred the opening of South Perth station to 2013, and in 2009, the station was indefinitely deferred after being left out of the state budget. Since then, the City of South Perth has advocated for the station to be built, with the mayor of South Perth saying in 2017 that the station would receive 4,500 to 5,500 boardings per day by 2026.

In August 2012, the government announced Aubin Grove station would be built at Russell Road / Gibbs Road, with a budget of $80 million. This followed a commitment two months earlier by Opposition Leader Mark McGowan to build the station if Labor were to win the upcoming state election. The station was planned to relieve pressure on Cockburn Central station, where car parks became fully occupied the earliest each day of any Mandurah line station. Georgiou Group was selected as the construction contractor in February 2015 for $57 million and the contract was signed in late 2015. The remaining $23 million in the budget was used to acquire two new three-car trains. Construction began in March 2016 and the station opened on 23 April 2017.

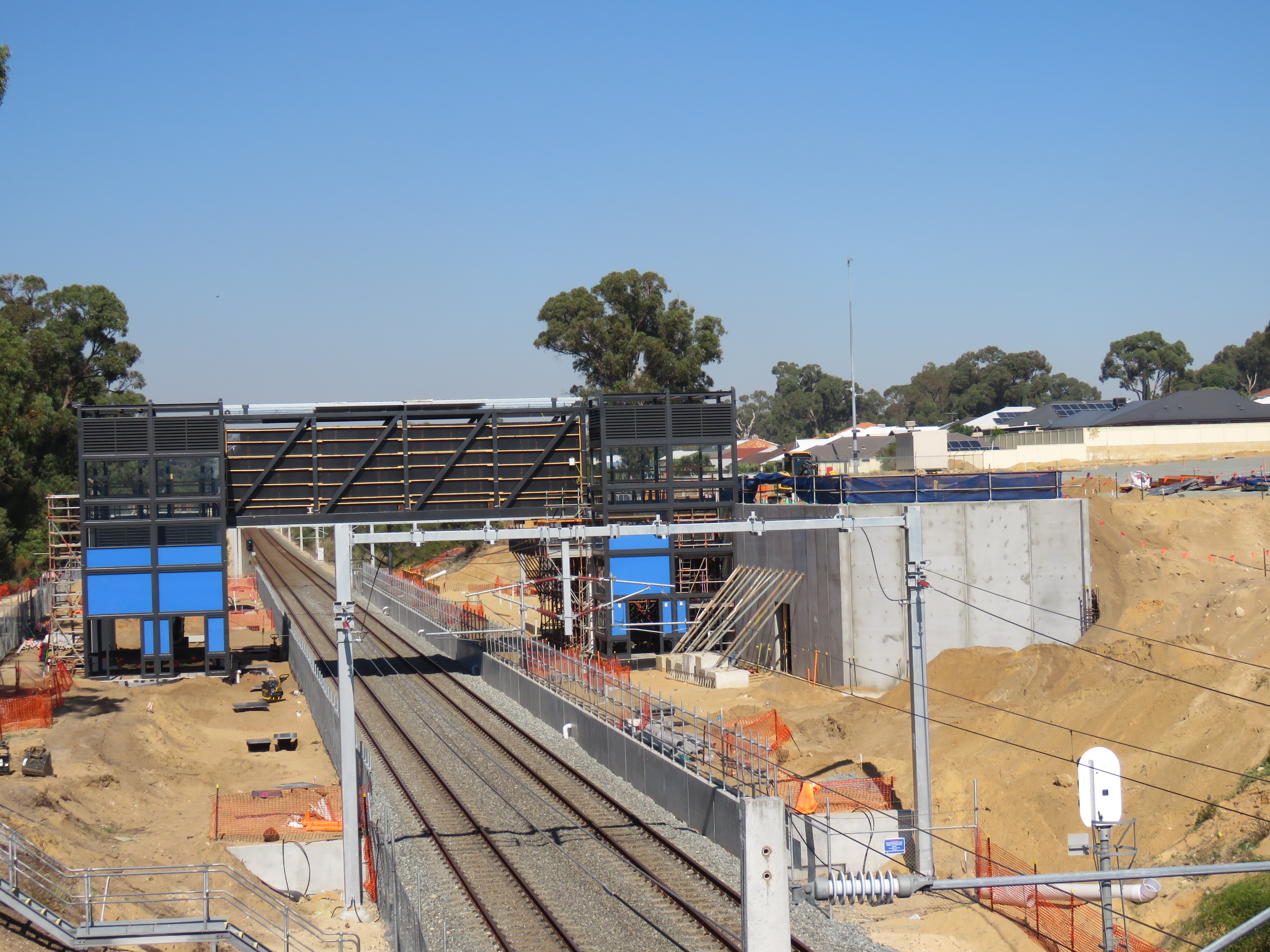
Lakelands station under construction, May 2022

In 2015, citing rapid population growth in the region, McGowan pledged to build Karnup station at Paganoni Road if he became Premier. After Labor won the 2017 state election, planning for the station commenced. Later that year, several public figures, including Mandurah Mayor Marina Vergone and federal Liberal MP Andrew Hastie, began advocating for Lakelands station to be built instead. By July 2019, the federal government had committed $35 million towards Lakelands station, which Transport Minister Rita Saffioti said was insufficient for the state government to build the station. After the federal contribution increased to $64 million in November 2019—80 percent of the station's estimated $80 million cost—the state government deferred Karnup station and instead committed to constructing Lakelands station. The contract to build Lakelands station was awarded to ADCO Constructions in January 2021. Early works commenced in August that year and the station opened on 11 June 2023, $8 million under budget.

In 2026, in light of the Secret Harbour by-election, the state government committed to starting construction on Karnup station in 2028. The cost was set at $156 million, to be half funded by land sales and half by the federal government, which has not yet committed the funding.

==== Thornlie–Cockburn Link ====
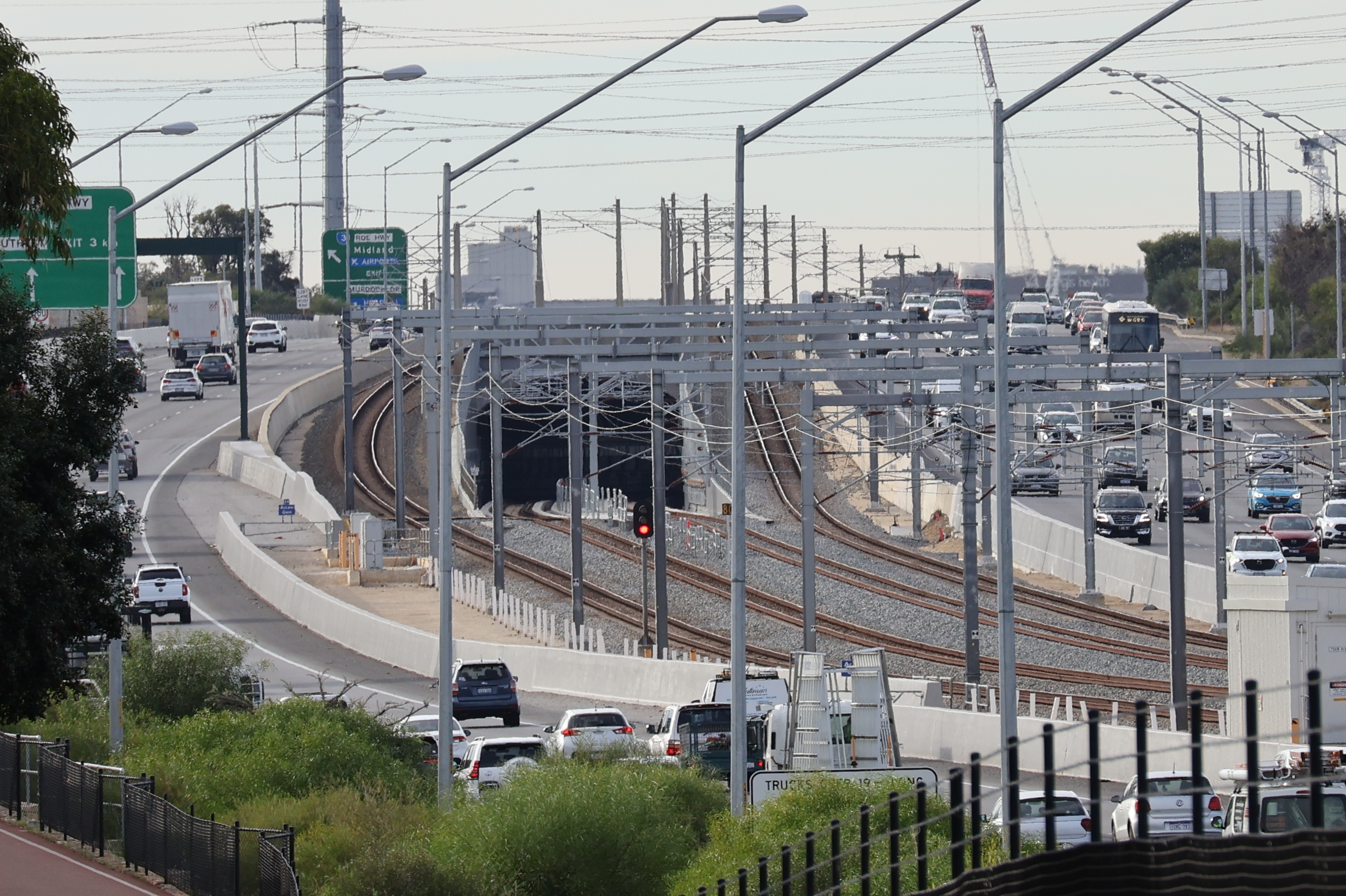
The Thornlie–Cockburn line entering the Glen Iris tunnel

Ahead of the 2017 state election, the Labor Party also committed to extending the Thornlie line from Thornlie to Cockburn Central, completing the original planned route of the Mandurah line. The NEWest Alliance, a joint venture between CPB Contractors and Downer, was awarded the contract in December 2019, and construction was underway by the middle of 2020. The Glen Iris tunnel, which was constructed in 2000 for the Mandurah line's Kenwick route, was used by the Thornlie–Cockburn line to enter the Kwinana Freeway median strip to reach Cockburn Central. The platform at Cockburn Central was extended to the north to create a new "dock-style platform", allowing the Thornlie–Cockburn line to remain operationally separate from the Mandurah line.

From 26 December 2021 to 14 January 2022, the Mandurah line between Elizabeth Quay and Aubin Grove stations was shut to facilitate works on the Thornlie–Cockburn Link. A temporary bus station was opened in Perth Convention and Exhibition Centre. This was the longest planned shutdown of a railway line in Perth's history at the time; 3 km (2 mi) of track between Cockburn Central station and the Glen Iris tunnel was moved to accommodate track for the Thornlie–Cockburn line. A second major shutdown of the Mandurah line occurred between 26 December 2022 and 3 January 2023 for the installation of turnouts linking the Thornlie–Cockburn line with the Mandurah line, communication and signalling equipment, overhead line equipment, and 4 km (2.5 mi) of rail. The Thornlie–Cockburn Link opened on 8 June 2025, with a final cost of $1.35 billion.

== Description ==
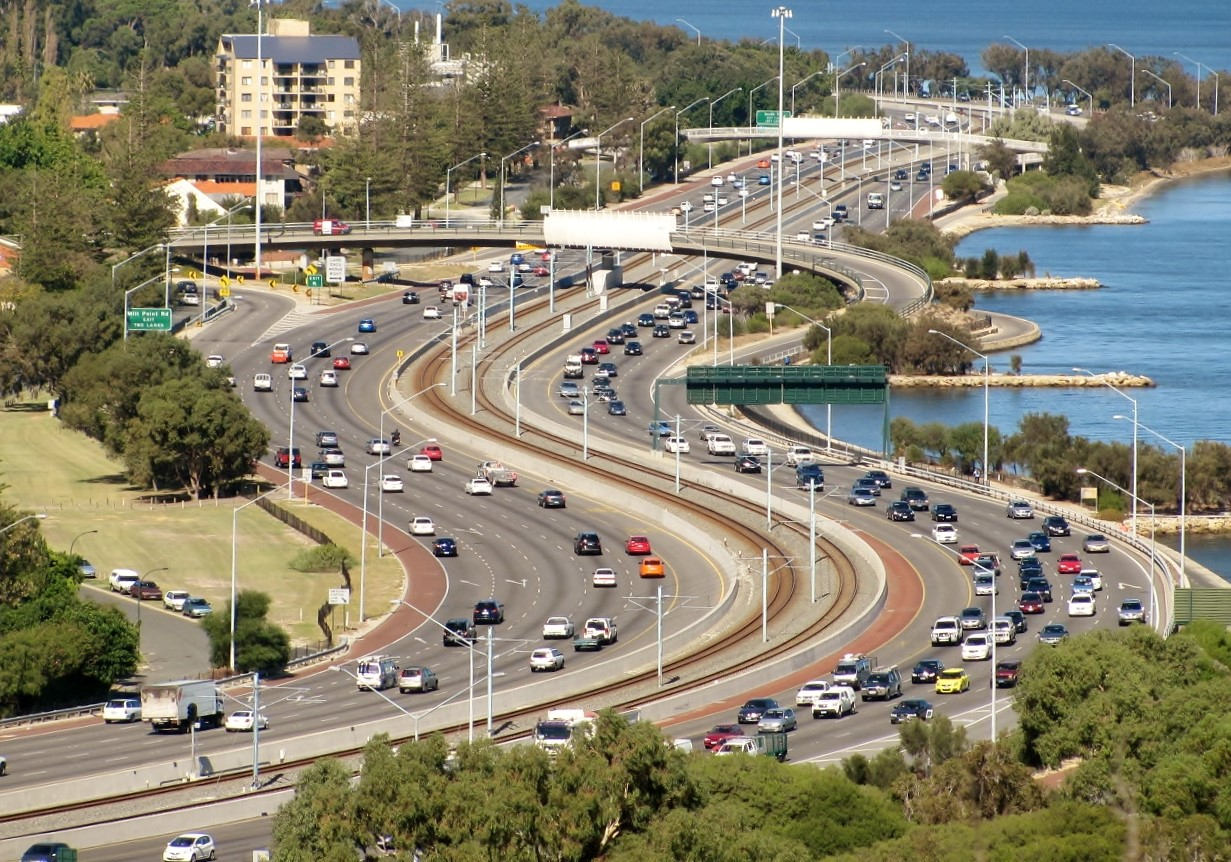
The Mandurah line is within the Kwinana Freeway's median strip between Perth and Kwinana

The Mandurah line was built with 1,067 mm (3 ft 6 in) narrow gauge track. Trains are powered by 25 kV 50 Hz AC overhead line equipment that is supplied with electricity by substations at Sutherland Street in West Perth, Glen Iris, and Parklands near Mandurah. The line is designed for a maximum speed of 140 kilometres per hour (87 mph), although the trains are only designed for speeds of 130 km/h (81 mph). The line uses automatic train protection and is signalled to allow for headways as short as three minutes using fixed block signalling. As part of the High Capacity Signalling Project, Alstom and DT Infrastructure will replace the signalling system with Alstom's Urbalis communications-based train control (CBTC) system, allowing for higher frequencies of service. As of 2026, this is planned to be operational in 2030.

=== Route ===
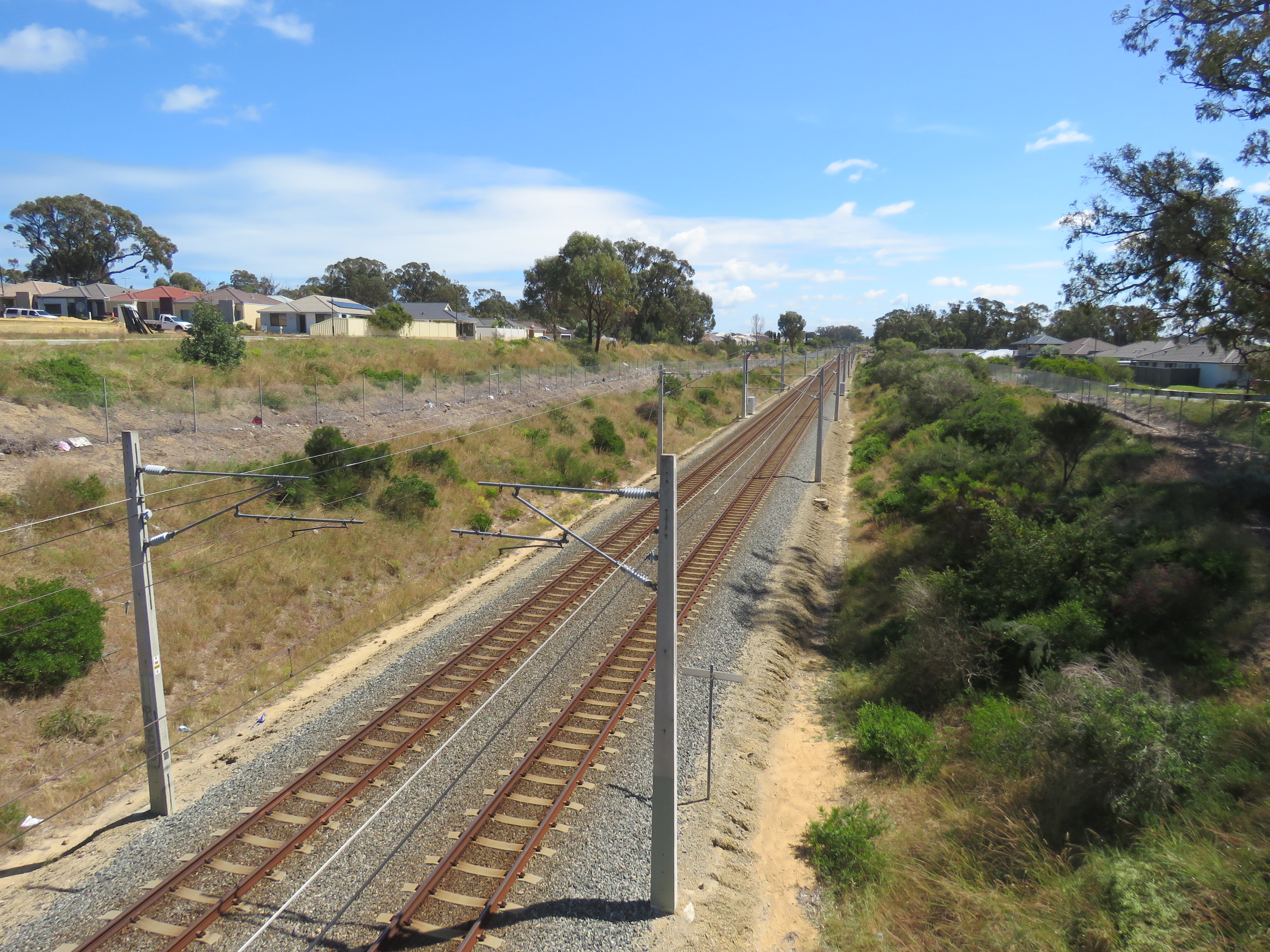
View north of Lake Valley Drive, Lakelands

The Mandurah line runs from Perth Underground station in the north to Mandurah station in the south, a distance of 70.8 km (44.0 mi). North of Perth Underground station, the line continues as the Yanchep line. Trains in the William Street tunnel between Perth Underground and Elizabeth Quay stations are considered to be simultaneously part of the Yanchep line and Mandurah line.

The Mandurah line runs south from Perth Underground station, through a 0.6 km (0.4 mi) tunnel to Elizabeth Quay station, surfaces and enters the Kwinana Freeway's median strip, and crosses the Swan River via the Narrows Bridge at the 1.9 km (1.2 mi) mark. South of the Narrows Bridge, the Mandurah line continues southwards along the Kwinana Freeway median strip, crossing the Canning River on the Mount Henry Bridge at the 10.1 km (6.3 mi) mark. There are five stations along the Kwinana Freeway; they are, from north to south: Canning Bridge, Bull Creek, Murdoch, Cockburn Central, and Aubin Grove. The Mandurah line connects to the Thornlie–Cockburn line at Cockburn Central station. South of Cockburn Central station are two turnback sidings where trains change direction.

Near Kwinana, at approximately 31.5 km (19.6 mi), the Mandurah line exits the Kwinana Freeway and veers to the south-west via the Anketell tunnel. South-west from there, the line has six stations: Kwinana, Wellard, Rockingham, Warnbro, Lakelands, and Mandurah. At Rockingham station, the Mandurah line veers southwards to parallel Ennis Avenue for a few kilometres. Continuing southwards, the line traverses the Mandjoogoordap Drive median strip and terminates at Mandurah station, where the Mandurah railcar depot is located.

=== Stations ===
All stations on the Mandurah line are fully accessible. Due to the distant station spacing, each station has a bus interchange and most stations have a large car park to provide good station access. All platforms are approximately 150 m (490 ft) long, allowing for six-car trains to stop at all stations.

List of Mandurah line stations
Station	Image	Distance from Perth		Location	Opened	Connections
Station	Image	km	mi	Location	Opened	Connections
Perth Underground	Perth Underground station concourse	0.0	0.0	Perth CBD	15 October 2007	Bus at Perth Busport; Australind, Airport, Armadale, Ellenbrook, Fremantle, Midland and Thornlie–Cockburn lines Services continue on the Yanchep line
Elizabeth Quay	Elizabeth Quay station underground platform	0.6	0.4	Perth CBD	15 October 2007	Bus at Elizabeth Quay bus station
Canning Bridge	Canning Bridge station platforms	7.2	4.5	Como	23 December 2007	Bus
Bull Creek	Bull Creek station platform	11.7	7.3	Bateman, Bull Creek	23 December 2007	Bus
Murdoch	Murdoch station platform	13.9	8.6	Leeming, Murdoch	23 December 2007	Bus
Cockburn Central	Cockburn Central station platform	20.5	12.7	Cockburn Central, Jandakot	23 December 2007	Bus, Thornlie–Cockburn line
Aubin Grove	Aubin Grove station platform	23.8	14.8	Atwell, Success	23 April 2017	Bus
Kwinana	Kwinana station platforms	32.9	20.4	Bertram, Parmelia	23 December 2007	Bus
Wellard	Wellard station platforms	37.1	23.1	Wellard	23 December 2007	Bus
Rockingham	Rockingham station platforms	43.2	26.8	Cooloongup, Rockingham	23 December 2007	Bus
Warnbro	Warnbro station platforms	47.5	29.5	Warnbro	23 December 2007	Bus
Lakelands	Lakelands station platforms	64.4	40.0	Lakelands	11 June 2023	Bus
Mandurah	Mandurah station viewed from a bridge	70.8	44.0	Mandurah	23 December 2007	Bus

== Service ==
Transperth train services are operated by the Public Transport Authority. Mandurah line headways are as short as five minutes during peak hours, increasing to fifteen minutes outside peak and on weekends, and half-an-hour to an hour at night. During peak times, some trains terminate or commence at Cockburn Central station. The travel time from Perth Underground station to Mandurah station is 54 minutes. As a result of the distant station spacing, the Mandurah line has an average speed of 79 kilometres per hour (49 mph), making it by far Australia's fastest suburban rail line. On weeknights, the last train arrives at Mandurah station at 1:11 am and the first train departs at 4:35 am. On Saturday and Sunday nights, the last train arrives at Mandurah station at 3:09 am, and the first train departs at 5:02 am on Saturdays and at 6:25 am on Sundays. During events at Perth Stadium, extra services run from Mandurah to Perth Stadium station and vice versa via the Thornlie–Cockburn line.

Before January 2016, express services operated on the Mandurah line during peak periods to manage overcrowding. The introduction of more B-series sets allowed for most peak-time trains to be six cars long, which increased capacity and allowed all services to stop at all stations from 31 January 2016. Before then, some peak trains did not serve Canning Bridge station. Before June 2009, services terminating at Cockburn Central also operated off-peak, making for 7½-minute headways between Perth and Cockburn Central during the day. These services were withdrawn to reduce costs.

From 2031, peak frequencies on the Mandurah line are planned to reach 18 trains per hour. This will be made possible by the C-series trains having three doors per car, which reduces dwell times compared to B-series trains, and the communications-based train control signalling upgrade.

=== Rolling stock ===
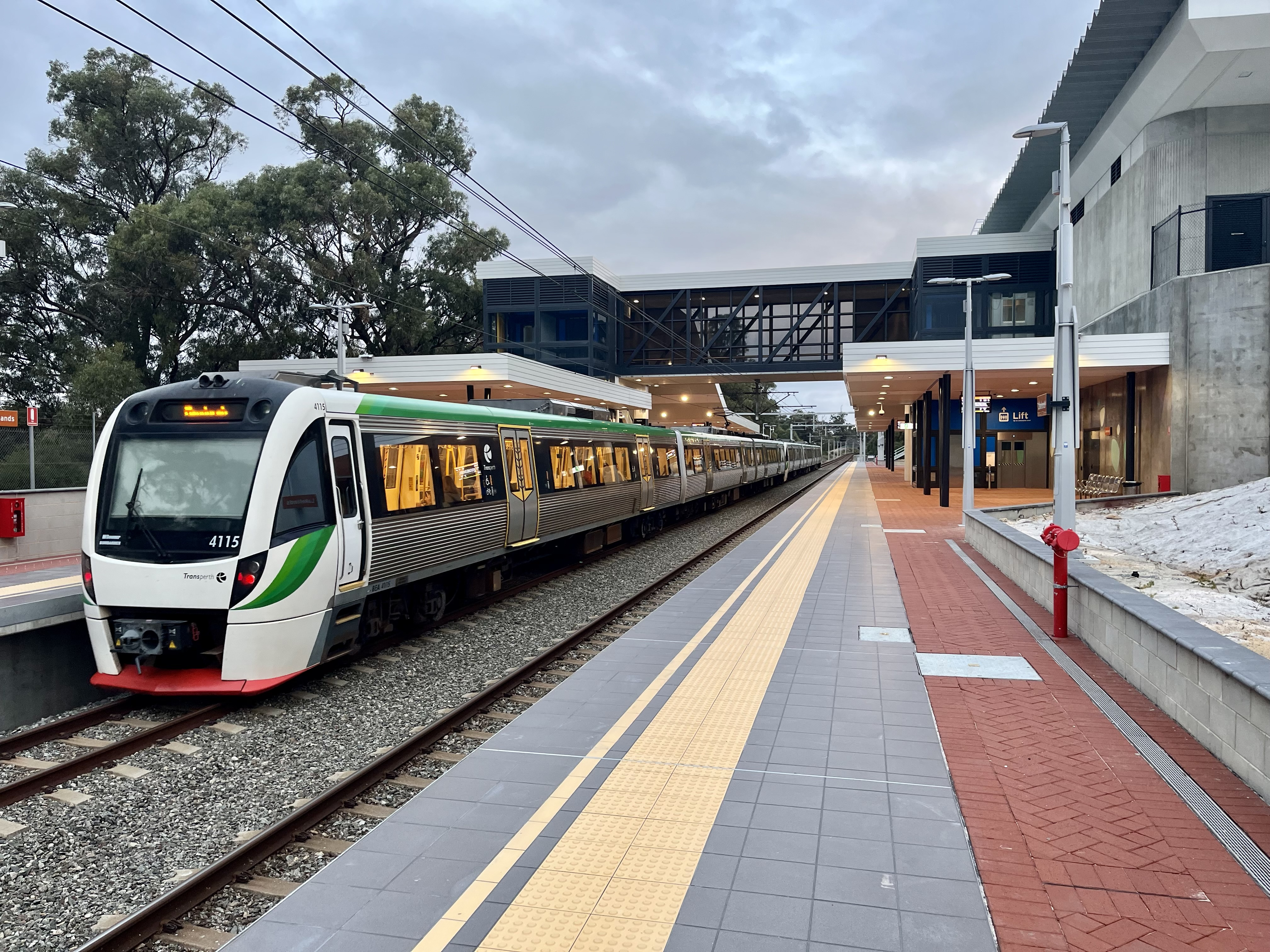
A B-series train at Lakelands station

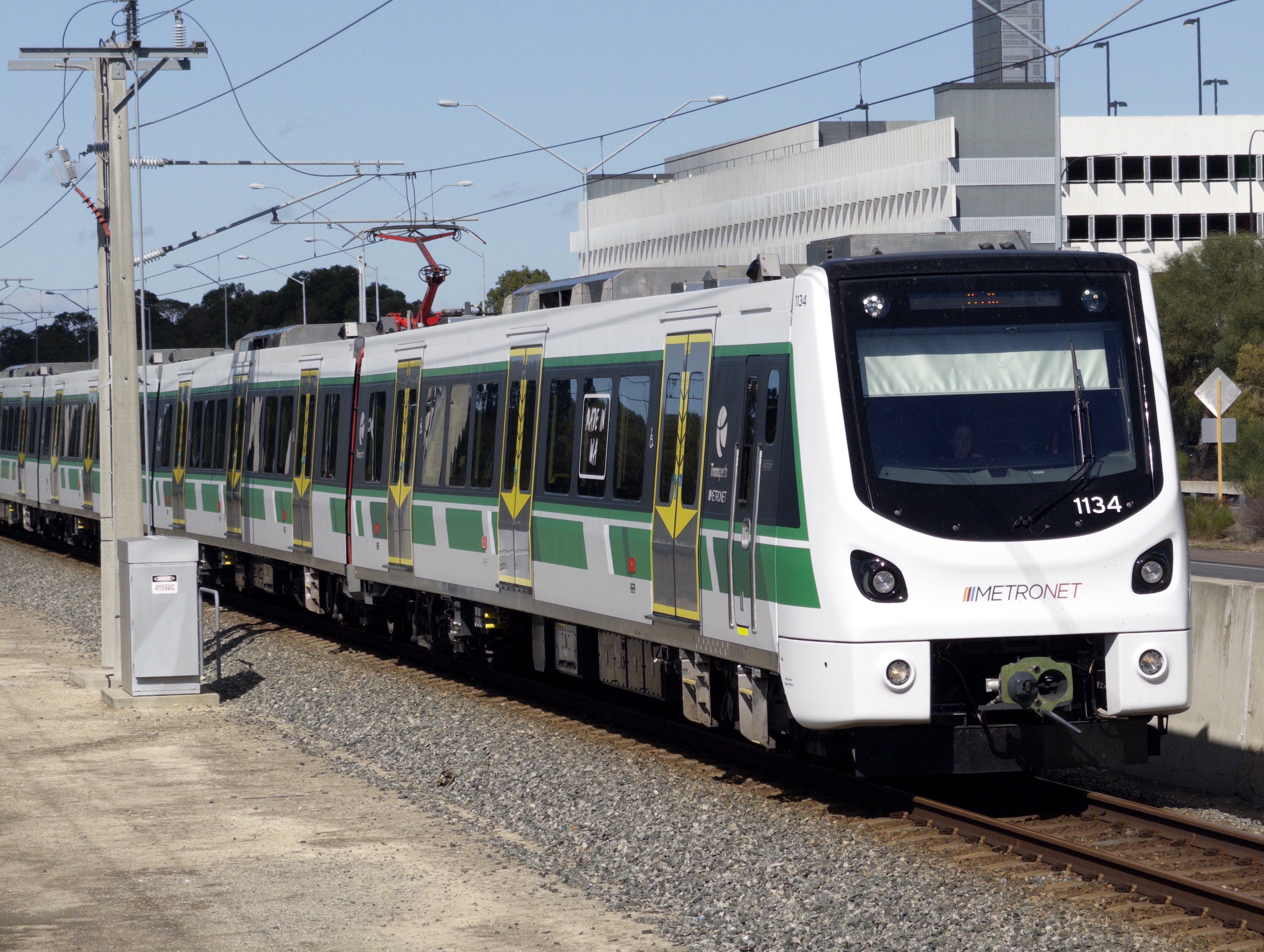
A C-series train at Murdoch station

The main rolling stock used on the Mandurah line are Transperth B-series and C-series trains, with occasional use of A-series trains. The A-series trains entered service between 1991 and 1999, have a maximum speed of 110 km/h (68 mph), and consist of two cars that are usually joined to form four-car trains. Each car has two doors on each side. The B-series trains entered service between 2004 and 2019, have a maximum speed of 130 km/h (81 mph), and consist of three cars that are usually joined to form six-car trains. Each car has two doors per side. The C-series trains have been entering service since 2024, have a maximum speed of 130 km/h (81 mph), and consist of six cars with three doors on the side of each car.

In May 2002, the state government signed a contract with EDI Rail and Bombardier Transportation for the construction of Nowergup depot at the northern end of the Joondalup line, and the delivery and maintenance of 31 three-car B-series trains to be used on the Joondalup and Mandurah lines. Those trains were all delivered by June 2006. The government ordered another 15 B-series trains in December 2006. The first of the new railcars entered service in June 2009, allowing for the transfer of some A-series trains to other lines. In July 2011, a further 15 B-series trains were ordered; this order was eventually increased to 22. The first of these trains entered service in December 2013, and by the end of the order, all A-series trains had been transferred to other lines and almost every peak-hour train on the Mandurah line had six cars.

In December 2019, the state government signed a contract with Alstom for the delivery and maintenance of 41 C-series trains to replace the A-series trains and provide rolling stock for network expansions. The C-series trains have three doors on the side of each car, decreasing dwell times. The first C-series train entered service on the Mandurah and Joondalup lines on 8 April 2024. The C-series trains are planned to be initially used only on the Yanchep and Mandurah lines, and the B-series trains transferred to other lines to replace the retiring A-series trains.

=== Patronage ===
Mandurah line annual patronage
Year	Patronage	±%
2010–11	18,519,864	—
2011–12	20,293,223	+9.58%
2012–13	21,150,408	+4.22%
2013–14	20,663,690	−2.30%
2014–15	20,699,900	+0.18%
2015–16	20,595,401	−0.50%
2016–17	20,343,828	−1.22%
2017–18	20,545,716	+0.99%
2018–19	20,900,819	+1.73%
2019–20	16,882,261	−19.23%
2020–21	14,856,023	−12.00%
2021–22	14,357,888	−3.35%
2022–23	17,669,846	+23.07%
2023–24	21,874,779	+23.80%
2024–25	23,075,517	+5.49%
2025–26	23,728,644	+2.83%

Patronage on the Mandurah line has exceeded expectations, and has driven increases in use on other train lines and bus routes by extending the network's overall reach. Before opening in December 2007, it was projected that 50,000 passengers would use the Mandurah line per weekday, or about 15 million per year. By February 2008, the line's average number of boardings were over 30,000 per weekday and 15,000 per weekend day. By March, patronage exceeded 40,000 boardings per weekday, and by July, nearly 50,000 boardings per weekday, reaching the target more quickly than expected. Patronage on the bus routes that were replaced was 16,000 per weekday. Boardings across the whole train network had increased by 57 percent since the Mandurah line opened, from 115,000 to 180,000 per day. Canning Bridge, Bull Creek and Murdoch, the stations the Kenwick route did not serve, recorded some of the strongest patronage. In the first half of 2008, the Mandurah line made up 28 percent of all fare-paying boardings on Transperth trains, and over the whole of 2008, the Mandurah line had approximately 15 million boardings, exceeding that of the Joondalup line to become the busiest Transperth railway line. The PTA's chief executive officer Reece Waldock described the Mandurah line as a "victim of its own success" due to overcrowding and full car parks. He attributed the higher-than-expected patronage to a resources boom in Western Australia at the time, an increase in fuel prices and individual awareness of climate change.

The Mandurah line reached an initial peak of 21,150,408 boardings in the 2012–13 financial year (Note: An Australian financial year is from 1 July to 30 June the following year.) before a period of stagnation. Patronage declined the following financial year because of shutdowns caused by the Perth City Link and economic factors, but slightly increased the next year. In 2015–16 and 2016–17, patronage declined again, but then increased over the following two years, reaching 20,900,819 in 2018–19 due to a rebound in Western Australia's economy. The COVID-19 pandemic's onset in 2020 resulted in a massive decrease, reaching a low of 14,357,888 boardings in 2021–22, since then recovering to reach a record high of 23,728,644 boardings in 2025–26, making the line the busiest Transperth railway line.

The busiest stations on the Mandurah line as of 2013–14 were Perth Underground, Elizabeth Quay, Murdoch, Cockburn Central, Mandurah, and Bull Creek. The least-busiest stations as of 2013–14 were Wellard, Kwinana, and Canning Bridge. As of October 2017, Elizabeth Quay and Murdoch stations are the second-busiest and third-busiest Transperth stations, respectively.
