= Rockingham Light Rail =

Proposed public transport infrastructure in Western Australia

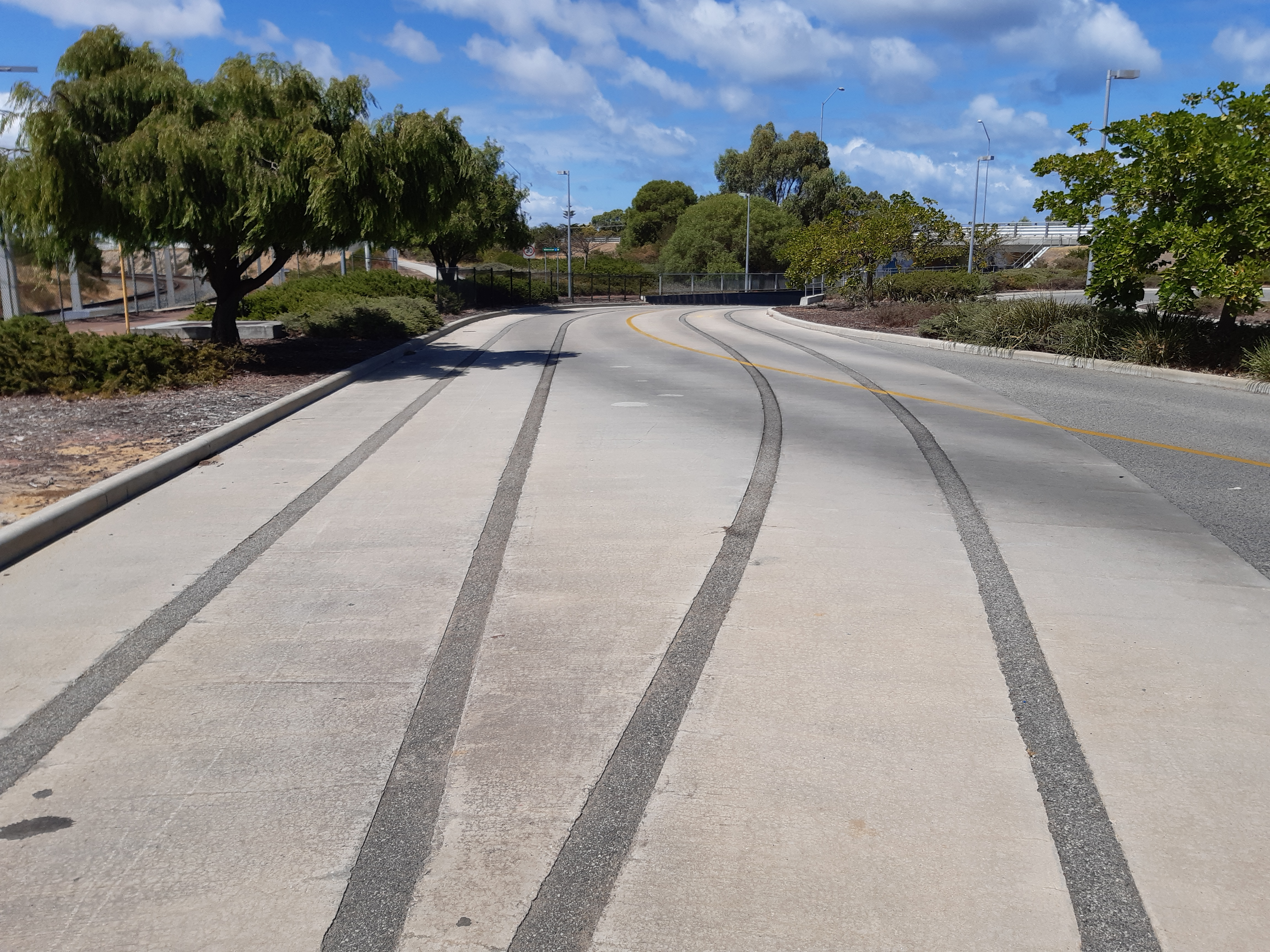
- Provisions for light rail track at Rockingham station

Overview
- Locale: Rockingham, Western Australia
- Transit type: Light rail
- Number of lines: 1
- Number of stations: 13

Technical
- System length: 6.8 km (4.2 mi)
- Track gauge: 1,435 mm (4 ft 8 1/2 in)

The Rockingham Light Rail is a proposed light rail system within the City of Rockingham in Western Australia. The proposal aims to link Rockingham station with the Rockingham Beach foreshore via the Rockingham Centre and central business district.

== History ==
Under the original 1999 Southern Suburbs Railway plan, Rockingham station would have been located within the Rockingham central business district close to major shopping and civic areas. This plan proposed the line to access Rockingham CBD by tunnel. However, in 2002, the Mandurah railway line was altered to operate via a more direct route from Perth via the median strip of the Kwinana Freeway rather than via the Armadale and Kwinana lines as originally planned. The planned central Rockingham station was abandoned at this time, in order to offset the extra cost of the Perth leg. The new location avoided the cost of tunneling under Rockingham, but was now located on the edge of the city rather than in the centre of it two kilometres east of the Rockingham Centre.

To make up for the lost heavy rail link, the State Government announced plans to construct a light rail link to the Rockingham CBD instead. This did not transpire, although provision was made in the station design and layout for it. Evidence of the abandoned light rail is seen in the busway approach to the station, where concrete tracks can be seen.

The cost of the proposed light rail system was estimated at $107 million in 2012. As of 2017, the City of Rockingham and surrounding councils remain supportive of building the transport link.
