= List of mayors of South Perth =

The City of South Perth is a local government area in Perth, Western Australia. It was established on 9 June 1892 as the South Perth Road District, with a chairman as the leader of the road board. In February 1902, it became the Municipality of South Perth, with a mayor as the leader of its municipal council. It changed back to the South Perth Road District in March 1922, and then changed back to the Municipality of South Perth in February 1956. It became the City of South Perth in June 1959, still with a mayor as the leader of the city council.

== South Perth Road Board (1892–1902) ==
Chairman	Term	Ref
A. B. Wright	1892–1893	
W. James	1893–1894	
John Daniel Manning	1894–1895	
W. James	1895–1896	
John Daniel Manning	1896–1897	
E. C. Shenton	1898–1899	
J. D. Manning	1899–1901	

== Municipality of South Perth (1902–1922) ==
Mayor	Term	Ref
J. Charles	1902	
A. B. Wright	1902–1904	
S. W. Curtis	1904–1906	
T. Coombe	1906–1908	
H. McA. Henning	1908–1909	
E. C. Shenton	1909–1912	
R. D. Jones	1913–1914	
Alec Clydesdale	1914–1921	
J. W. Paterson	1921	

== South Perth Road Board (1922–1956) ==
Chairman	Term	Ref
J. W. Paterson	1922	
H. A. Pilgrimm	1922	
E. Tindale	1922–1924	
S. H. Fletcher	1924–1925	
G. H. W. Long	1925–1926	
I. C. Campbell	1926–1928	
G. H. W. Long	1928–1930	
H. A. Pilgrim	1930–1934	
G. V. Abjornson	1934–1940	
D. F. Vincent	1940–1948	
S. Lambert	1948–1951	
R. W. King	1951–1956	

== Municipality of South Perth (1956–1959) ==
Mayor	Term	Ref
R. W. King	1956	
W. C. G. Thomas	1956–1959	

== City of South Perth ==
Mayor	Term	Ref
W. C. G. Thomas	1959–1968	
J. G. Burnett	1968–1989	
P. Campbell	1989–1995	
J. E. Hardwick	1995–1999	
S. E. Pierce	1999–2000	
None (Commissioner was J. F. Donaldson)	2000–2002	
John Collins	2002–2007	
James Best	2007–2011	
Sue Doherty	2011–2019	
Greg Milner	2019–present	
