= Transperth C-series train =

Type of Transperth train

Transperth C-series
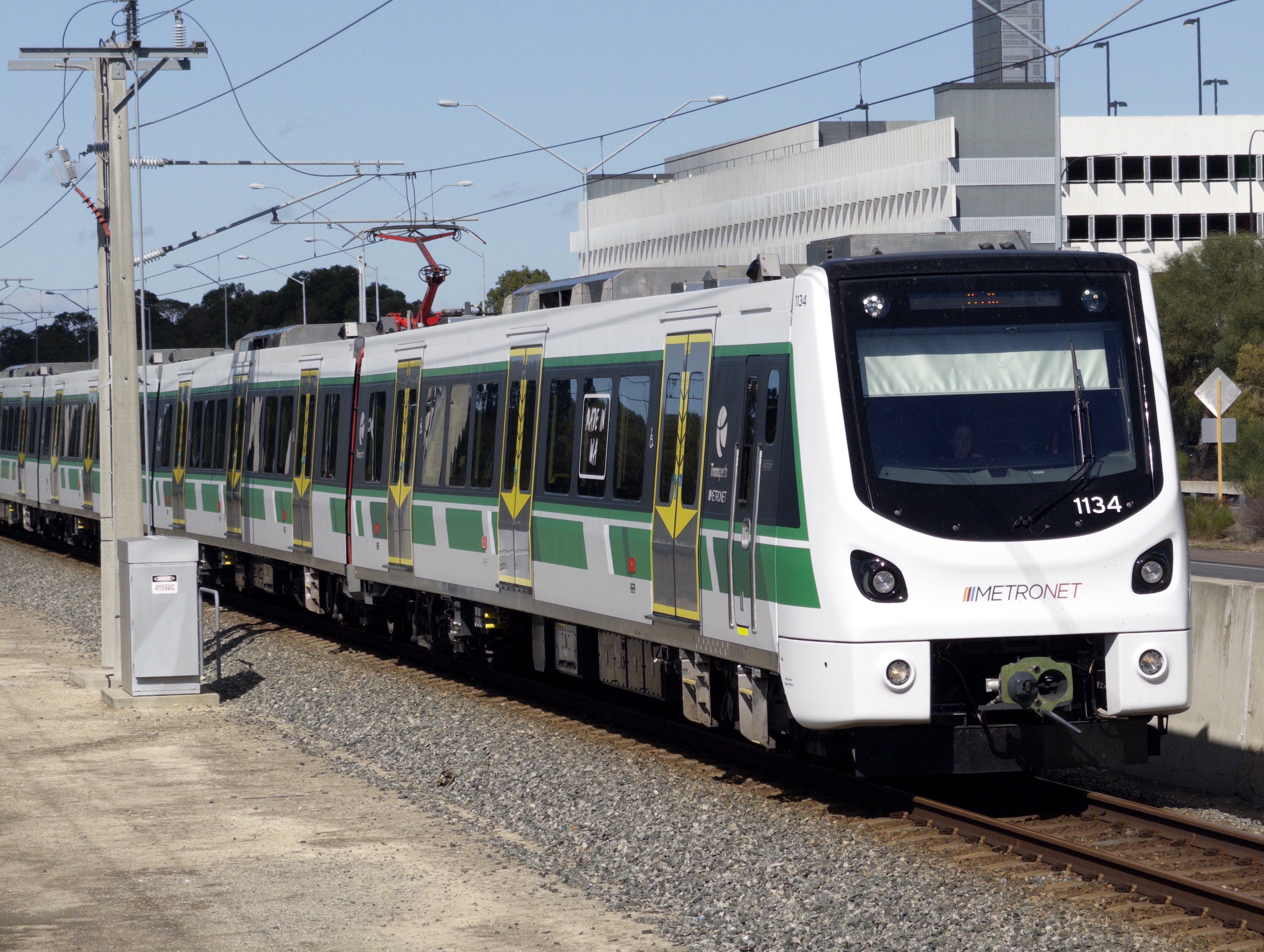
- C-series railcar at Murdoch station

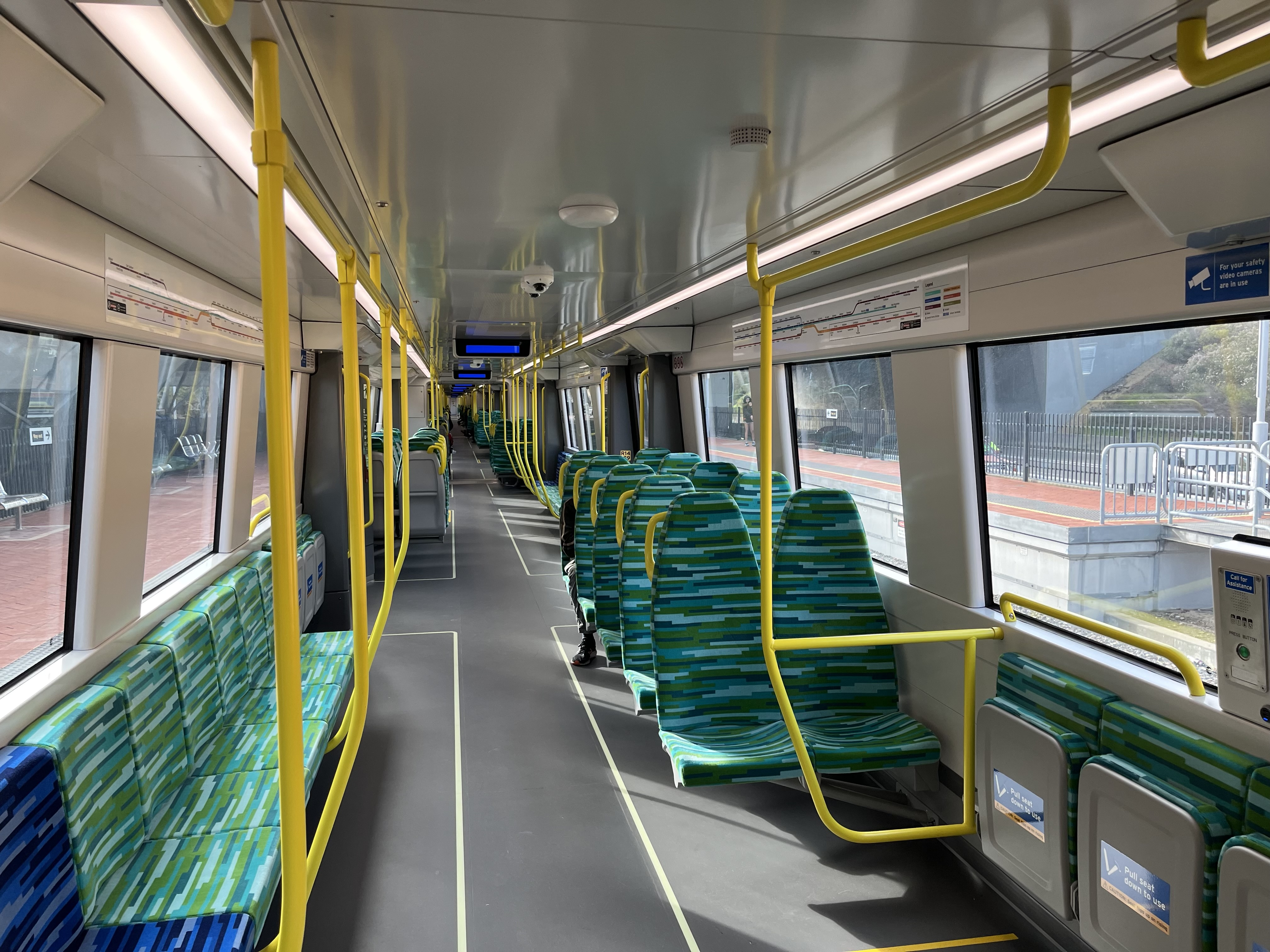
- Interior of a C-series train
- Stock type: Electric multiple unit
- In service: 2024–present
- Manufacturer: Alstom
- Assembly: Bellevue, Western Australia
- Built at: Bellevue Railcar Manufacturing and Maintenance Facility
- Family name: X'Trapolis
- Replaced: A-series
- Constructed: 2022–2029 (planned)
- Entered service: 8 April 2024
- Number under construction: Total delivery of 246 carriages (41 sets)
- Number in service: 54 carriages (9 sets)
- Predecessor: B-series
- Formation: 6-car sets
- Fleet numbers: 127–
- Capacity: 336 seated; (approx) 1184 total
- Operator: Public Transport Authority
- Depot: Nowergup
- Lines served: Mandurah; Yanchep; Thornlie–Cockburn (Stadium Event Days)

Specifications
- Car body construction: Stainless steel
- Train length: 143.35 m (470 ft 4 in)
- Car length: 24,435 mm (80 ft 2 in) (end cars); 23.62 m (77 ft 5 15/16 in) (intermediate cars)
- Width: 2,860 mm (9 ft 4 5/8 in)
- Height: 3,941 mm (12 ft 11 3/16 in)
- Entry: Level
- Doors: 3 per side of car
- Wheel diameter: 850–770 mm (33–30 in) (new–worn)
- Wheelbase: 2,400 mm (7 ft 10 1/2 in)
- Maximum speed: 160 km/h (99 mph); 130 km/h (81 mph) (operational)
- Weight: 245 t (241 long tons; 270 short tons)
- Traction motors: 16 × 6 ECA 3022 A 320 kW (430 hp)
- Power output: 5,120 kW (6,870 hp)
- Deceleration: 0.865 m/s^{2} (2.84 ft/s^{2})
- Electric system: 25 kV 50 Hz AC (nominal) from overhead catenary
- Current collection: Pantograph
- UIC classification: Bo′Bo′+2′2′+Bo′Bo′+Bo′Bo′+2′2′+Bo′Bo′
- Bogies: CL 606
- Braking systems: Regenerative and disc
- Coupling system: Dellner
- Seating: Mixed longitudinal and transverse
- Track gauge: 1,067 mm (3 ft 6 in)

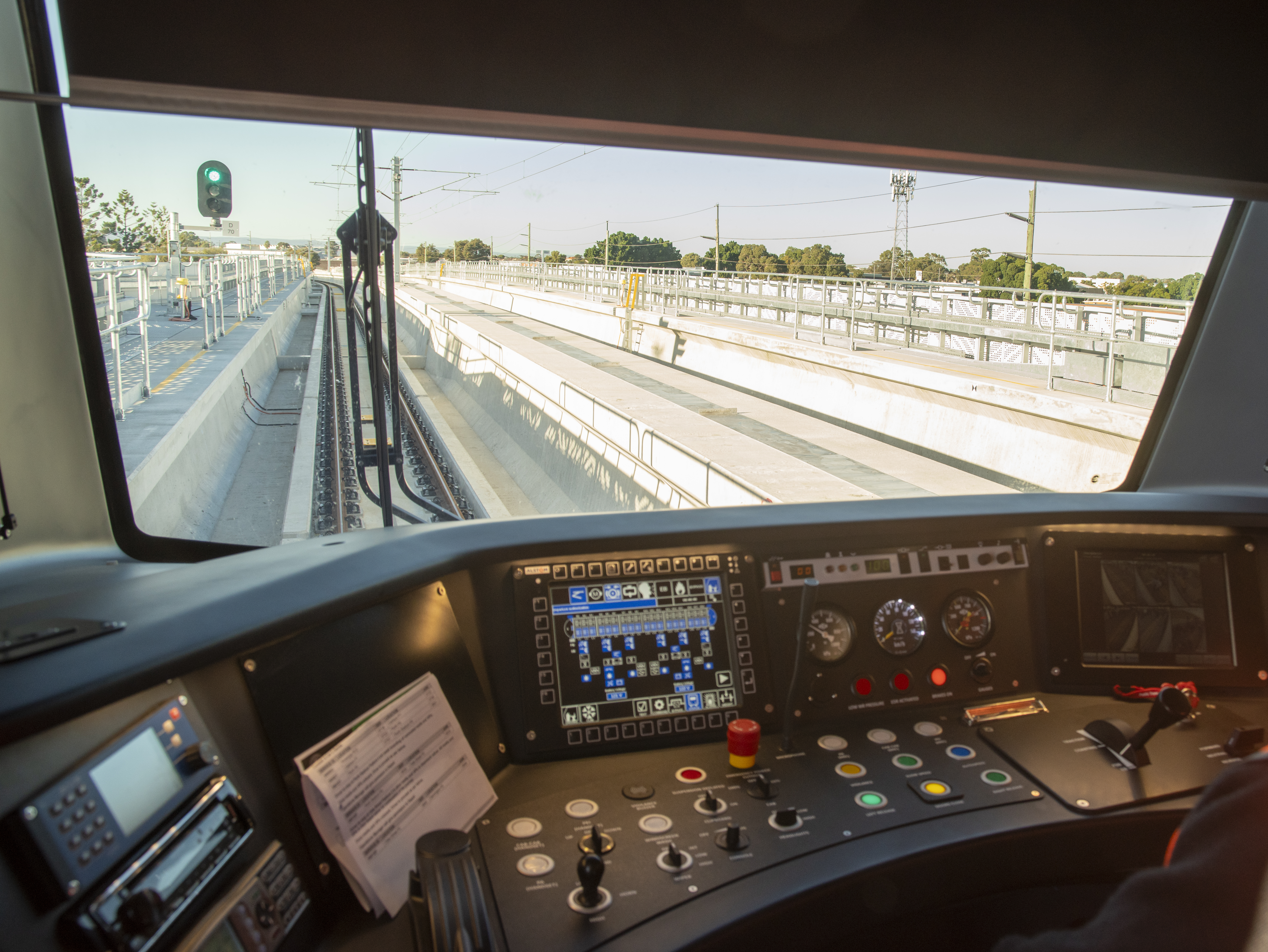
The driver's cab

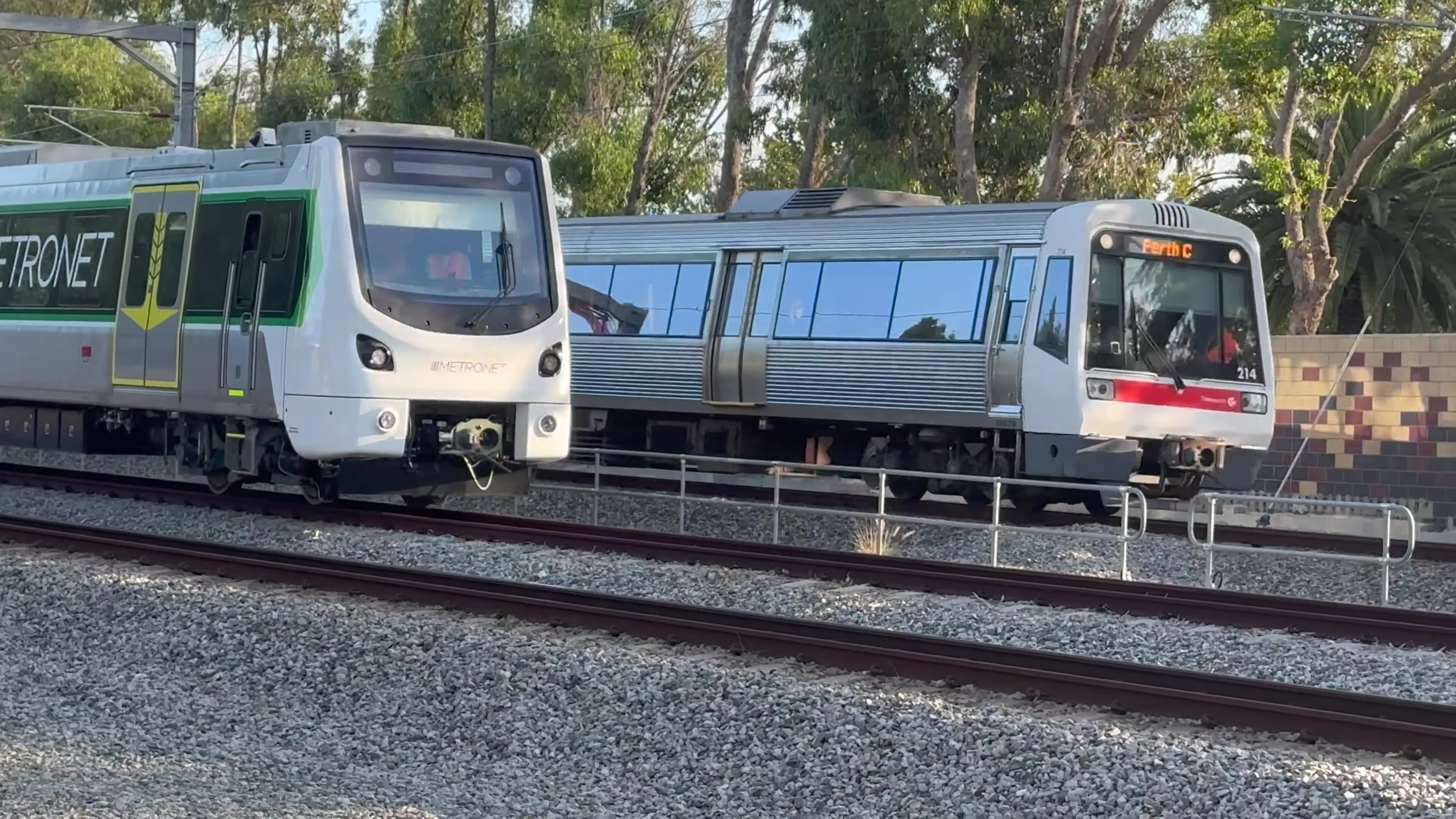
A C-series train (left) with its predecessor the A-series (right) in 2023

The Transperth C-series trains are a class of electric multiple units part of Alstom's X'Trapolis family of trains for Transperth that are being delivered as part of Metronet. The trains are operating on Perth's suburban rail network and entered service on the Yanchep and Mandurah lines on 8 April 2024. As of June 2026, there are nine out of a planned 41 C-series trains in service.

== History ==
In April 2018, the Public Transport Authority called for expressions of interest to build 41 6-carriage electric multiple units. Three consortia were shortlisted to bid:

- Alstom
- Bombardier / EDI Rail
- Momentum West, a consortium of CAF and UGL

On 18 August 2019, Alstom was announced as the successful bidder. The trains will be assembled in Bellevue. 17 sets will be delivered to provide rolling stock for network extensions as part of the Metronet project, while the other 24 will replace the A-series stock from 2024.

In December 2019, Alstom released details of the contract and early renders of what the new trains will look like. Under the contract, worth approximately €800 million (AUD1.3 billion), Alstom will be responsible for the design, supply, manufacturing, testing and commissioning of 41 six-car electric-multiple-unit (EMU) trains for suburban services and four, three-car diesel-multiple-unit (DMU) trains later named the ADR/ADS class for the Australind. The contract would include 50% local content, twenty years maintenance of the EMU trains and maintenance support services for the DMU trains.

From 3 April to 18 April 2021, a two thirds length mock-up of a single carriage was made available for the general public to view and provide feedback at Yagan Square. Notable features of the new trains include a mixture of high back seats and bench seating, graphical passenger information displays (that are used the same as its predecessors in service), USB ports and hard-worn flooring instead of the carpet-laid floors of previous trains. Later, the train mock-up was seen in the 2023 Perth Royal Show.

On 7 June 2021 (Western Australia Day), the Railcar Manufacturing and Assembly Facility was officially opened at the Bellevue Railcar Depot, and handed over to Alstom to commence manufacturing the trains. The first train was revealed on 14 August 2022, with twelve months of testing along the Joondalup and Mandurah lines set to occur before they are put in passenger service. Testing along the Joondalup line between Clarkson station and Butler station commenced on 23 December 2022.

The trains entered service on the Yanchep and Mandurah lines on 8 April 2024. A commemorative "first journey" occurred the day before on 7 April, with tickets to that open to the public via a lottery. As of 26 March 2026, there are nine C-series trains in service, with all current C-series trains used during weekdays, mostly on full line services. On weekends, approximately five C-series trains run on the Yanchep/Mandurah lines.

Since their introduction there have been complaints from passengers about the comfort and utility of the model. This includes complaints about the seats, lack of hanging straps and difficult to use door opening buttons. On 2 April 2025, the Transperth social pages announced that passengers could now "pre select" the doors before the train has fully stopped, similar to the A and B-series trains.

As of June 2026, there are nine C-series trains in service.
