= List of mayors of Rockingham =

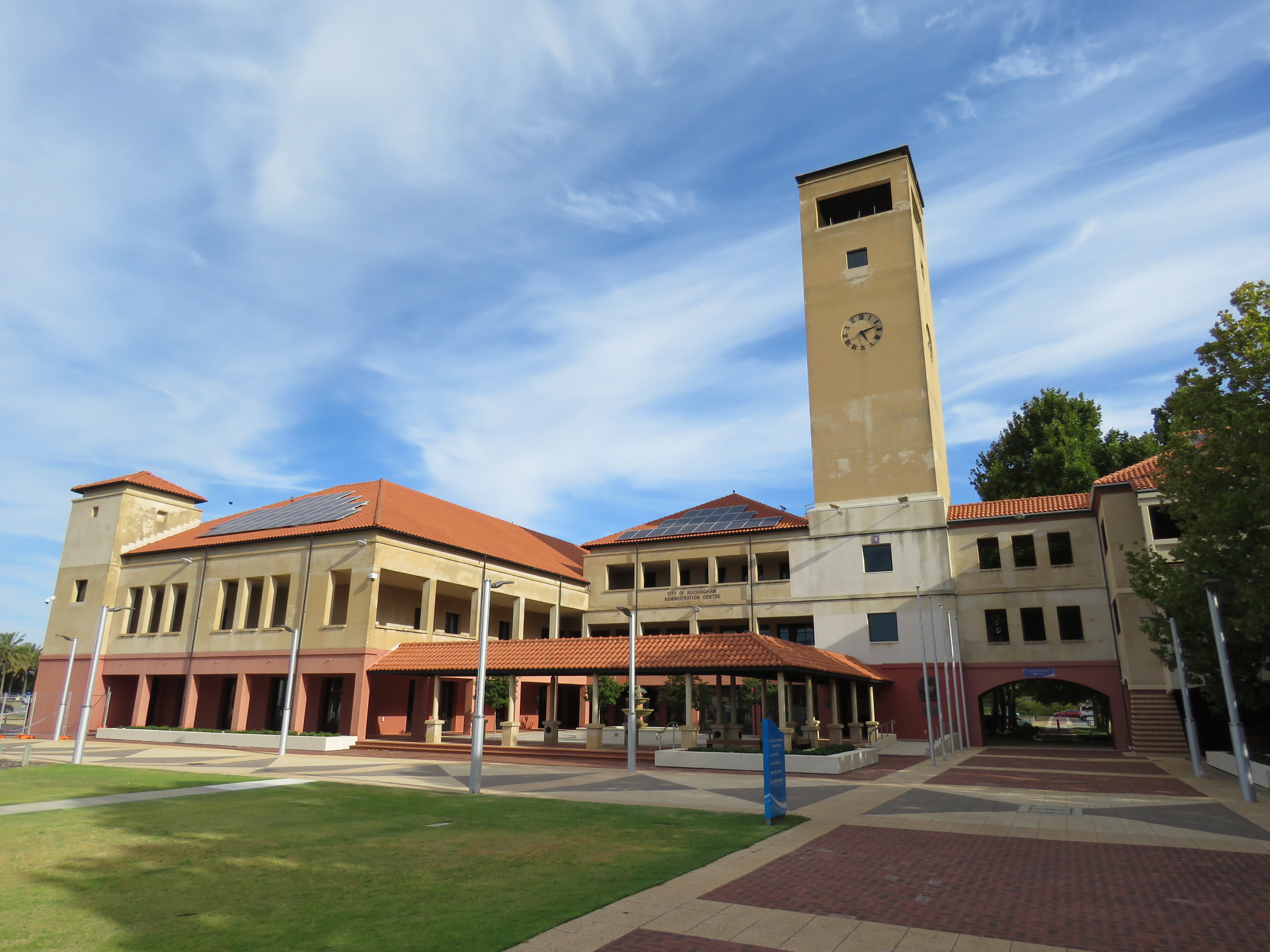
The Rockingham council chambers, seat of the mayor of Rockingham

The City of Rockingham in Perth, Western Australia, was gazetted on 4 February 1897 as the Rockingham Road Board with a chairman and councillors under the Roads Boards Act 1871. With the passage of the Local Government Act 1960, all road boards became Shires with a shire president and councillors effective 1 July 1961, the Rockingham Road Board thereby becoming Shire of Rockingham. Rockingham attained city status on 12 November 1988, at which point the president became a mayor.

Rockingham's current mayor, Lorna Buchan was elected in October 2025, with her predecessor being Deb Hamlin who was the first female to hold this office. Barry Sammels retired in August 2021 had been the longest-serving active mayor in Western Australia, having first been elected mayor of Rockingham in 2003.

Previous to the 2021 elections, the mayor of Rockingham had historically been elected by the councillors. After an eight year debate, the council voted in September 2020 to change to a publicly-elected mayor.

== Chairmen ==
The chairman of the Rockingham Road Board:

Chairman	Term
C. Parkin	1897–1902
E. Thorpe	1903–1908
C. G. Meade	1909–1912
S. Dvoretsky	1913–1916
D. Mitchinson	1917–1919
S. Dvoretsky	1920–1928
G. E. Grigg	1925–1938
S. Dvoretsky	1931–1932
T. H. Purdy	1939
F. W. Churcher	1940–1943
G. E. Grigg	1940–1947
H. E. France	1944
H. M. Growden	1947
W. L. Hughes	1948–1949
F. W. Churcher	1950
C. G. Lynch	1951–1953
N. H. France	1954–1956
Alf Powell	1957–1961

== Shire presidents ==
The shire presidents of the Shire of Rockingham:

President	Term
Alf Powell	1962–1981
W. D. A. Mays	1982–1986
Laurie E. Smith	1986–1988
Richard R. Smith	1988

== Mayors ==
The mayors of the City of Rockingham:

Mayor	Term
Richard R. Smith	1988–1991
Laurie E. Smith	1991–1994
F. W. Gardiner	1994–1997
Chris S. Elliott	1997–2003
Barry William Sammels	2003–2021
Deb A. Hamblin	2021–2025
Lorna Buchan	2025–

== Election results ==
The election results since switching to a publicly-elected mayor:

=== 2021 ===
2021 Ordinary Election – Rockingham
Candidate	Votes	%
Deb Hamblin	6,386	25.79
Lornan Buchan	5,489	22.17
Mark Jones	4,411	17.81
Craig Buchanan	4,203	16.97
Cullum Ashton	2,573	10.39
Jack Pleiter	1,699	6.86
Total formal votes	24,366	98.40
Informal votes	395	1.60
Turnout	24,761	28.58

=== 2025 ===
2025 Ordinary Election – Rockingham
Candidate	Votes	%
Lorna Buchan	10,054	37.81
Deb Hamblin	7,554	28.41
Mark Jones	6,644	24.99
Mike Crichton	2,054	7.72
Total formal votes	26,306	98.94
Informal votes	281	1.06
Turnout	26,587	27.03
