= Nowergup railway depot =

Transperth railway depot in Perth, Western Australia

- Interactive map of Nowergup railway depot

Location
- Location: Hester Avenue, Nowergup
- Coordinates: 31.6586°S 115.7277°E

Characteristics
- Owner: Public Transport Authority
- Operator: EDi Rail / Alstom Transport
- Rolling stock: Transperth B-series & Transperth C-series
- Routes served: Yanchep & Mandurah lines

Nowergup railway depot is a Transperth depot in the suburb of Nowergup, Western Australia. It is situated in the median of the Mitchell Freeway between the Lukin Drive and Hester Avenue interchanges.

== History ==
Nowergup depot was built to service the Transperth B-series electric multiple units that were ordered to operate service on the Yanchep line (formerly known as the Joondalup line). It is owned by the Public Transport Authority and leased to EDi Rail / Alstom Transport as part of its contract to maintain the B-series trains.

The depot was completed on 17 May 2004 and officially opened on 13 June 2004 by Premier Geoff Gallop and Planning & Infrastructure Minister Alannah MacTiernan. It was built at the end of a single track extension of the Yanchep line (then called the Joondalup line) beyond its then terminus of Clarkson. The line was extended to Butler in 2014 with the track duplicated and was further extended to Yanchep in 2024.

The depot is currently the base for B-series and C-series electric multiple units that operate services on the Yanchep and Mandurah lines. It is capable of holding 47 of the 3-car trains.
