= Transperth A-series train =

Type of Transperth train

Transperth A-series
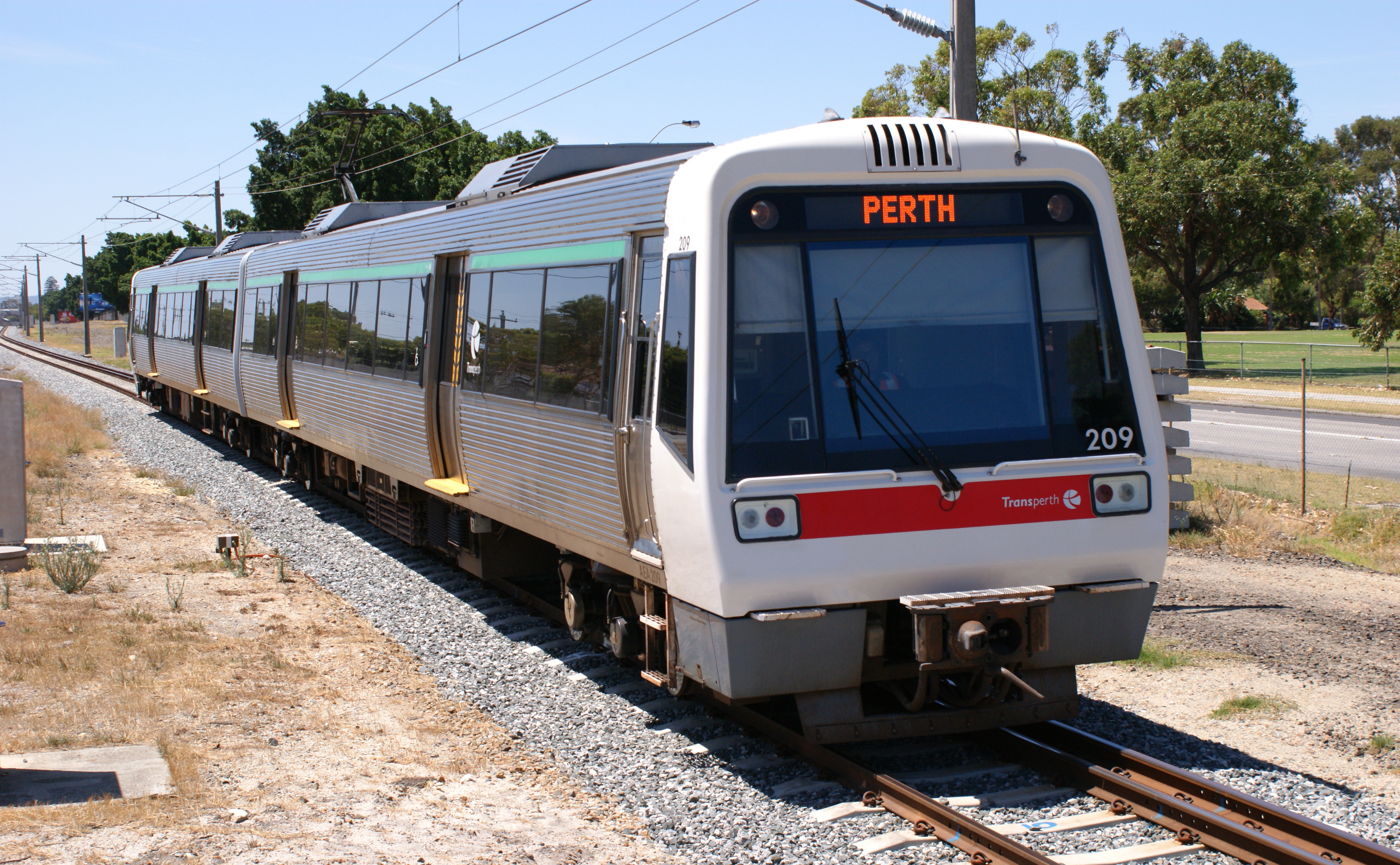
- A-series set 09 between Bassendean and Ashfield

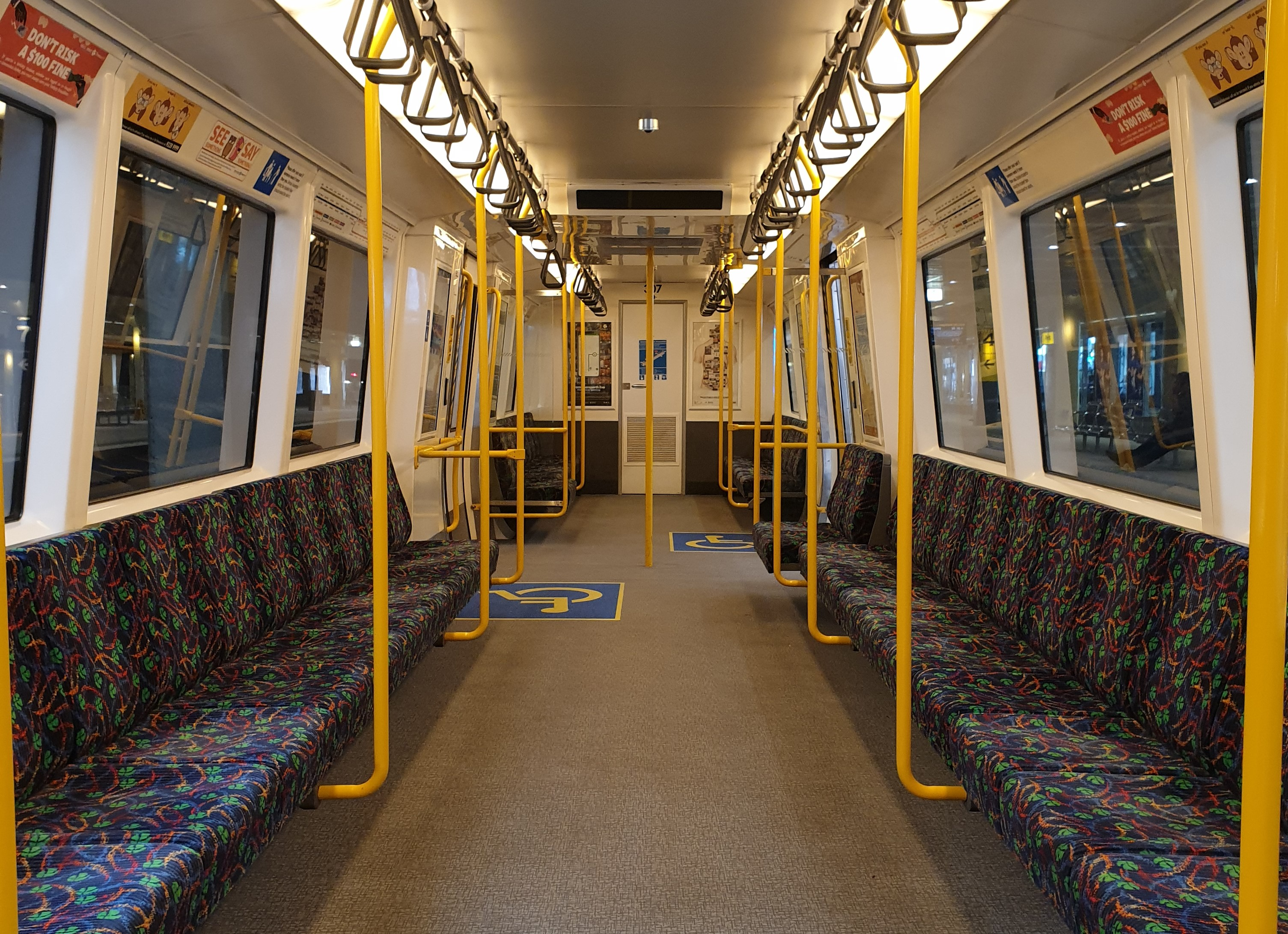
- Refurbished interior
- In service: 1990–present
- Manufacturers: ABB/Adtranz and Walkers
- Built at: Maryborough, Queensland
- Replaced: ADK/ADB and ADL/ADC class diesel railcars
- Constructed: 1990–1999
- Number built: 96 carriages (48 sets)
- Number in service: 96 carriages (48 sets)
- Successor: B-series, C-series
- Formation: 2-car sets
- Fleet numbers: 01–48; AEA: 201–248; AEB: 301–348
- Capacity: 148 seated, 164 standing (2-car set as delivered)
- Operator: Transperth
- Depot: Claisebrook
- Lines served: Armadale; Ellenbrook; Fremantle; Midland; Thornlie–Cockburn (Occasionally)

Specifications
- Car body construction: Stainless steel
- Train length: 48,422 mm (158 ft 10 3/8 in) (over coupler faces)
- Car length: 24,211 mm (79 ft 5 3/16 in) (over coupler faces)
- Width: 2.89 m (9 ft 5 3/4 in)
- Height: 3,699 mm (12 ft 1 5/8 in) (excluding roof equipment); 3,922 mm (12 ft 10 7/16 in) (including roof equipment)
- Doors: Pneumatic sliding pocket, 2 per side of car
- Wheelbase: 2,500 mm (8 ft 2 7/16 in)
- Maximum speed: 120 km/h (75 mph) (design); 110 km/h (68 mph) (service)
- Weight: 94 t (93 long tons; 104 short tons)
- Traction system: ABB GTO–phase-fired controller
- Traction motors: 6 × ABB 195 kW (261 hp) DC motor
- Power output: 1.17 MW (1,569 hp)
- Acceleration: 0.8 m/s^{2} (2.6 ft/s^{2})
- Deceleration: 1.12 m/s^{2} (3.7 ft/s^{2})
- Electric system: 25 kV 50 Hz AC (nominal) from overhead catenary
- Current collection: Pantograph
- UIC classification: Bo′Bo′+Bo′2′
- Bogies: Fabricated steel
- Braking systems: Electro-pneumatic braking (Davies and Metcalfe)
- Safety system: Ansaldo STS L10000 ATP
- Coupling system: Scharfenberg; Dellner (2012 and 2022 refit)
- Seating: Longitudinal
- Track gauge: 1,067 mm (3 ft 6 in)

Notes/references
- Sourced from except where noted

The A-series trains are a class of electric multiple unit built by Walkers Limited in Maryborough, Queensland for Transperth between 1991 and 1999. When introduced in 1991, the A-series trains became the first electric passenger trains to operate in Western Australia and until 2004, were the only type of train in use on the Perth suburban rail network.

== History ==
Studies for the electrification of Perth's suburban rail network began in 1984 and in 1988 43 two-car electric railcars were ordered from Walkers Limited, Maryborough. Prior to this, Perth's rail transport network consisted of three railway lines radiating from Perth and operated by a mixture of diesel railcars and diesel locomotive hauled trains. In 1979, one of these lines, the Fremantle line, was closed but reopened in 1983 following a change in State Government.

The trains were transported across the continent on standard gauge bogies and converted to Western Australia's 3 ft 6 in (1,067 mm) gauge standard locally. The first set, set 01, arrived in September 1990 and immediately became the subject of industrial action at Westrail's Midland Railway Workshops over a pay dispute and the impending one-man train operation which the new trains would ensure.

Testing of the new trains began soon afterwards and mostly on the Armadale line while the electrification process continued. While the trials were largely successful a number of negative points were noted, not the least of which were braking issues and the creation of a harmonic vibration from the train's bogies which caused nausea in otherwise healthy passengers.

The trains entered revenue service on the 28 September 1991, running Perth Royal Show specials and by April 1992 had virtually taken over the suburban network timetables, with only a very limited number of services still operated by the older diesel trains. The last entered service on 30 October 1992.

Some sets have been named:

- 01 City of Perth named 11 April 1992
- 02 City of Armadale named 11 April 1992
- 03 Shire of Swan named 11 April 1992
- 04 City of Fremantle named 11 April 1992
- 05 City of Wanneroo named 21 March 1993
- 43 City of Maryborough named 30 October 1993

The new trains revolutionised the commuter services on the Perth network, but their success was marred by project delays and a number of early accidents. Some of those accidents involved collisions with motor vehicles at unprotected level crossings, the increased speed and quieter operation as opposed to the older, slower and louder, diesel trains being considered as a contributing factor. In three accidents within the first twelve months of operations three fatalities - all in motor vehicles - were suffered.

Other accidents did not involve loss of life and some, such as a collision between sets while shunting at the train depot at Claisebrook, meant that some sets were mixed while their other half underwent repairs. Several months in 1993, for instance, saw the pairings of AEA226 and AEB339, and AEA217 and AEB326. When repairs were completed the original set combinations were restored.

Additionally, a number of teething troubles soon presented themselves, such as braking problems which meant that trains would sometimes fail to stop in the space required and thus not be correctly positioned at the station platforms. These problems were eventually overcome and the type has provided stable service ever since.

In April 1997, a further five were ordered, entering service in 1998/99. These sets introduced longitudinal seating and the current green Transperth livery to the fleet, and with detail improvements including internal information panels, extra security cameras and quieter wheel motors, were subsequently dubbed 'second generation' sets. They are externally identical. Some of the first generation trains were then progressively updated to bring them inline with the more recent units.

== Configuration ==
There are currently 48 two-car A-series trains in operation. Each set consists of two semi-permanently coupled cars, designated AEA and AEB, both of which have a driver's cab and powered bogies. It is common practice to operate them only as either two- or four-car consists, but three sets may be coupled together to make a six-car train.

Originally, the majority of A-series trains featured two inward-facing rows of bench seats either side of the car forward of the front set of doors and to the back of the rear set of doors, with two-seat rows running down each side of the car in between the doors. In this configuration each car has the capacity to carry 72 seated and 82 standing passengers, giving unmodified the A-series trains a total capacity of 308.

However, since 2010, all sets have been reconfigured with two inward-facing bench rows running the entire length of the car. This reduces the number of seats available but increases standing room capacity. Each car has 1-2 wheelchair spaces available.

== Upgrades ==
Over time the A-series received several upgrades, including new External Destination Indicators (EDI) and Internal Passenger Information Displays (PID), Passenger Emergency Intercom (PEI), USB Charging and Onboard Public Address System for controlling Announcements which were designed and supplied by COMRAIL. Upgrades to the traction/brake traction controllers were made by retrofitting the fleet with a controller similar to those found in the B-series. The controllers improved operation comfort and control reliability, as the older controller design caused discomfort to the driver if used for long periods of time and suffered from a very "Notchy and inconsistent" feel when changing between traction and brake levels.

== In service ==
The A-series trains mainly run on the Fremantle, Midland, Armadale, and occasionally Thornlie–Cockburn lines. Until late-2016, the Yanchep and Mandurah lines were also serviced by 12 two-car A-series trains at high-demand periods, coupled together to make 4 cars. From 2024 until the opening of the Thornlie-Cockburn Line on 8 June 2025, upon which they were reallocated to the new line, A-series trains were occasionally operating as 4- or 6-car consists in service between Cockburn and Yanchep, primarily on the "W" patterns between Cockburn and Whitfords, however an A series did at one point go the full route to Mandurah whilst in service due to a B-series breakdown at Claisebrook Depot on March 20th 2025. After the opening of the Thornlie-Cockburn Line the A-series occasionally run on these lines when demand is high, such as during events at Perth Stadium. C-series trains have also been made and are servicing these lines as well.

=== USB charging ports ===
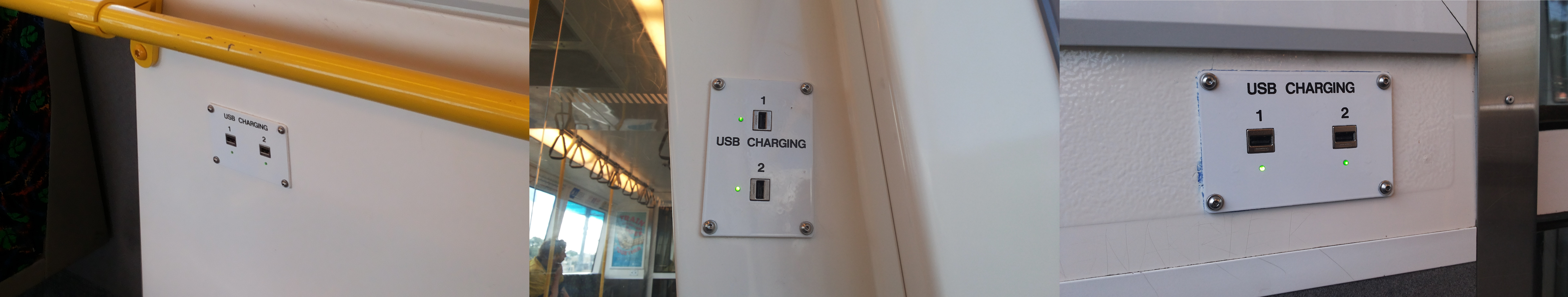
The USB charging ports on A-series (sets 43 and 44)

In early-2016, A-series sets 43 and 44 were fitted by COMRAIL with USB charging ports as part of a 6-month trial which was deemed successful. The USB port were designed and built by COMRAIL for the PTA to handle the harsh conditions and were tested to rail specifications. They are located at the wheelchair bays, on the exterior of the door housing alongside the priority seats and beside the inter-carriage gangway door.

== See also ==
- Transperth B-series train
- Transperth C-series train
- Queensland Rail Suburban multiple unit
- Queensland Rail Interurban multiple unit
