= Harvey railway station, Western Australia =

Railway station in Western Australia

Harvey
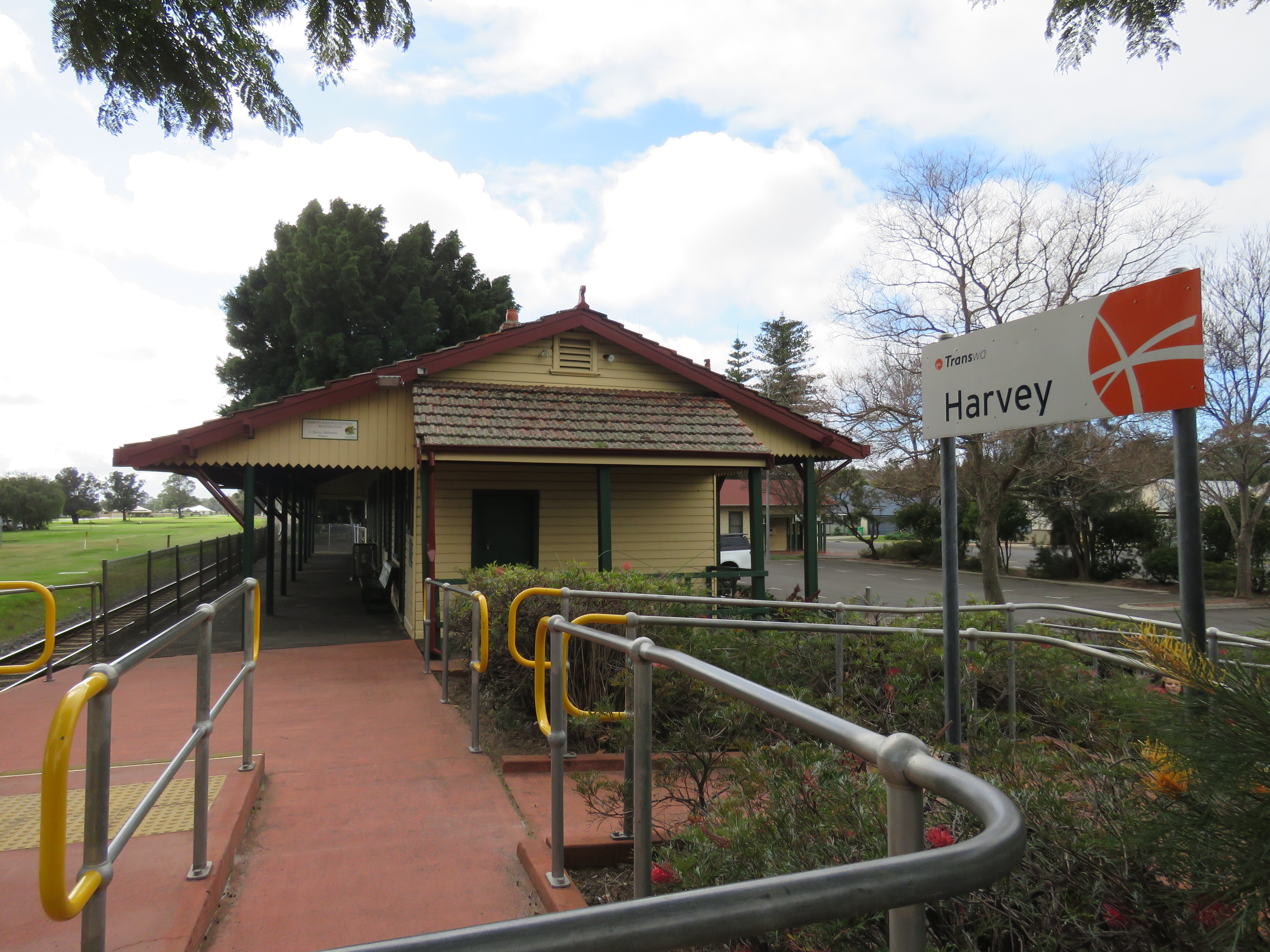
- Harvey railway station in July 2023

General information
- Location: Harper Street, Harvey; Australia
- Coordinates: 33.079°S 115.898°E
- Owner: Public Transport Authority
- Operator: Transwa
- Line: South Western
- Distance: 138 kilometres (86 mi) from Perth
- Platforms: 1
- Tracks: 1

Construction
- Structure type: Ground
- Accessible: Yes

History
- Opened: 1893

Services
Preceding station	Transwa	Following station
Cookernup towards Perth	Australind	Brunswick Junction towards Bunbury
Location

Harvey railway station is located on the South Western Railway in Western Australia. It serves the town of Harvey.

== History ==
Harvey station opened in August 1893 shortly after the South Western Railway was extended from Pinjarra to Bunbury.

In 1936, the station was extended and the building improved with rustic weatherboards to the exterior and the roof tiled. Harvey's timber, dairy, beef and other agricultural commodities trade, including from the irrigated dairy industry, ensured busy goods traffic at the station. Passenger traffic at the station was substantial well into the 1970s. Harvey was serviced by both the iconic 'Australind' passenger service as well as the early-morning Bunbury Belle shopper - both of which ran between Perth and Bunbury. The advent of greatly improved road linkages on the South West Highway and the efficiency of road-based transport saw usage of the line progressively decline from the 1970s onwards.

The station became unattended in 1984 with the building now housing the Harvey Railway Station Museum. In 2000, a high-level platform was built as part of a disability upgrade.

The station is today still served by Transwa's twice daily Australind service.
