= WAGR ADF/ADU class =

Western Australian diesel railcars

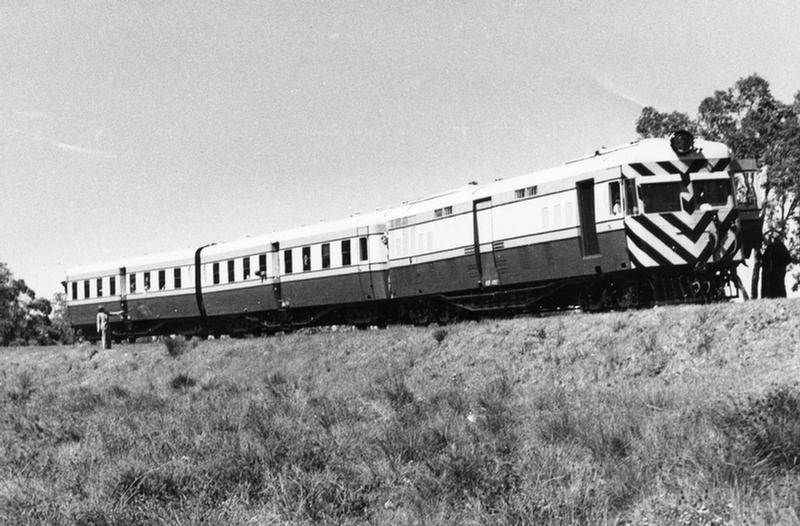
- ADF490 and two ADUs on a test run in 1949
- Stock type: Diesel railcar
- In service: 1949-1963, 1964-1975
- Manufacturer: Midland Railway Workshops
- Replaced: ADE "Governor" railcar
- Constructed: 1949-1950
- Entered service: 1949
- Refurbished: 1964
- Retired: 1963, 1975
- Number built: ADE: 6 ADU: 12
- Number in service: 0
- Number preserved: ADF: 1
- Number scrapped: ADF: 5 ADU: 11
- Predecessor: ADE "Governor" railcar
- Formation: ADF + 2x ADU; Later ADF + 4x ADU + ADF for Bunbury Belle and The Shopper
- Fleet numbers: ADF 490-495; ADU 580-591
- Capacity: ADU: 64 passengers
- Operator: WAGR

Specifications
- Car body construction: Steel clad
- Train length: 165 ft (50 metres)
- Car length: ADF: 62 ft (19 metres) over body, 63 ft (19 metres) over couplers. ADU: 51 ft (16 metres)
- Width: 8 feet 10 inches (2,690 mm)
- Height: 11 feet 2 1/4 inches (3.410 m)
- Floor height: 2 feet 5 1/2 inches (749 mm)
- Doors: ADF: 2 per side, not for passenger use ADU: 1 per side
- Wheel diameter: 2 feet 7 1/2 inches (800 mm)
- Wheelbase: ADF: 53 feet 6 inches (16.31 m); ADU: 49 feet 6 inches (15.09 m)
- Weight: 50 long tons 15 cwt (113,700 lb or 51.6 t)
- Prime mover: 2 x English Electric 6H
- Engine type: tbd
- Cylinder count: 6
- Cylinder size: 8 inch (203mm) stroke, 6 inch (152mm) bore
- Power output: 209 bhp at 1500rpm
- Transmission: ADF: Electric
- Wheels driven: 8 per ADF
- Seating: ADU: Transverse saloon
- Track gauge: 1,067 mm (3 ft 6 in)

The WAGR ADF class (also known as the Wildflower class) was a six member class of diesel-electric railcars operated by the Western Australian Government Railways between 1949 and 1975.

== History ==
In 1949/50, the Midland Railway Workshops delivered built six diesel-electric railcar sets to replace the Governor sets. Each set had one powered ADF railcar and two ADU trailers. All were named after wildflowers, hence the class name.

Number	Name
ADF490	Boronia
ADF491	Crowea
ADF492	Grevillea
ADF493	Hovea
ADF494	Leschanaultia
ADF495	Banksia

The first was launched to the media on 23 August 1949 followed by a demonstration run from Perth to Pinjarra. They entered service shortly after, operating from Perth to Albany, Perth to Geraldton via Wongan Hills and Mullewa, Perth to Merredin, Perth to Chidlow, Perth to Ongerup and Kalgoorlie to Esperance.

All were withdrawn between 1959 and 1963 as daylight country passenger trains were withdrawn and replaced by road coaches. In 1964 three ADFs (492, 493, and 495) and four ADUs (588-591) were refurbished to operate the new Bunbury Belle and The Shopper services, the normal consist on these trains being four ADUs with an ADF at each end, repainted in the suburban livery of green, white, and red. A further four ADUs were converted to locomotive hauled carriages. All were written off in 1975 with ADF495 preserved by Rail Heritage WA.

== Sources ==
- Higham, Geoffrey (2007). Marble Bar to Mandurah: A History of Passenger Rail Services in Western Australia (1st ed.). Bassendean: Rail Heritage WA. ISBN 978-0-9803922-0-3. OCLC 271545712. Wikidata Q140375689.
