= The Shopper =

Rail service in Western Australia

Overview
- Service type: Passenger train
- Status: Ceased
- Locale: South West Western Australia
- First service: 1 June 1964
- Last service: 31 July 1975
- Former operator: Western Australian Government Railways

Route
- Termini: Perth; Bunbury
- Distance travelled: 167 kilometres
- Train number: 92/93
- Line used: South Western

The Shopper was a passenger train operated by the Western Australian Government Railways between Perth and Bunbury via the South Western line from June 1964 until July 1975.

== History ==
The Shopper commenced operating on 1 June 1964 between Perth and Bunbury with Wildflower class railcars. It ceased on 31 July 1975, being replaced by road coaches.

== Sources ==
- Higham, Geoffrey (2007). Marble Bar to Mandurah: A History of Passenger Rail Services in Western Australia (1st ed.). Bassendean: Rail Heritage WA. ISBN 978-0-9803922-0-3. OCLC 271545712. Wikidata Q140375689.

== See also ==
- Bunbury Belle
