= South Western Railway, Western Australia =

Main railway route between Perth and Bunbury in Western Australia

South Western Railway
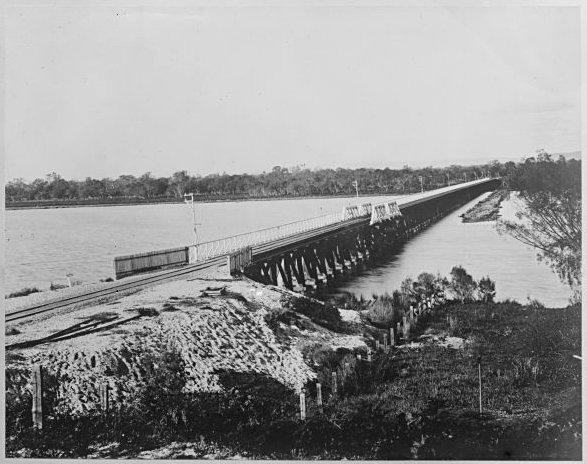
- Bunbury Bridge in 1930

Overview
- Owner: Public Transport Authority; Arc Infrastructure
- Termini: Perth; Bunbury
- Stations: 31

Service
- Type: Commuter rail Heavy rail
- Operator(s): Public Transport Authority; Aurizon

History
- Opened: 22 May 1893 (Perth–Pinjarra); 22 August 1893 (Pinjarra–Bunbury)

Technical
- Line length: 181 km (112 mi)
- Track gauge: 1,067 mm (3 ft 6 in)

The South Western Railway, also known as the South West Main Line, is the main railway route between Perth and Bunbury in Western Australia.

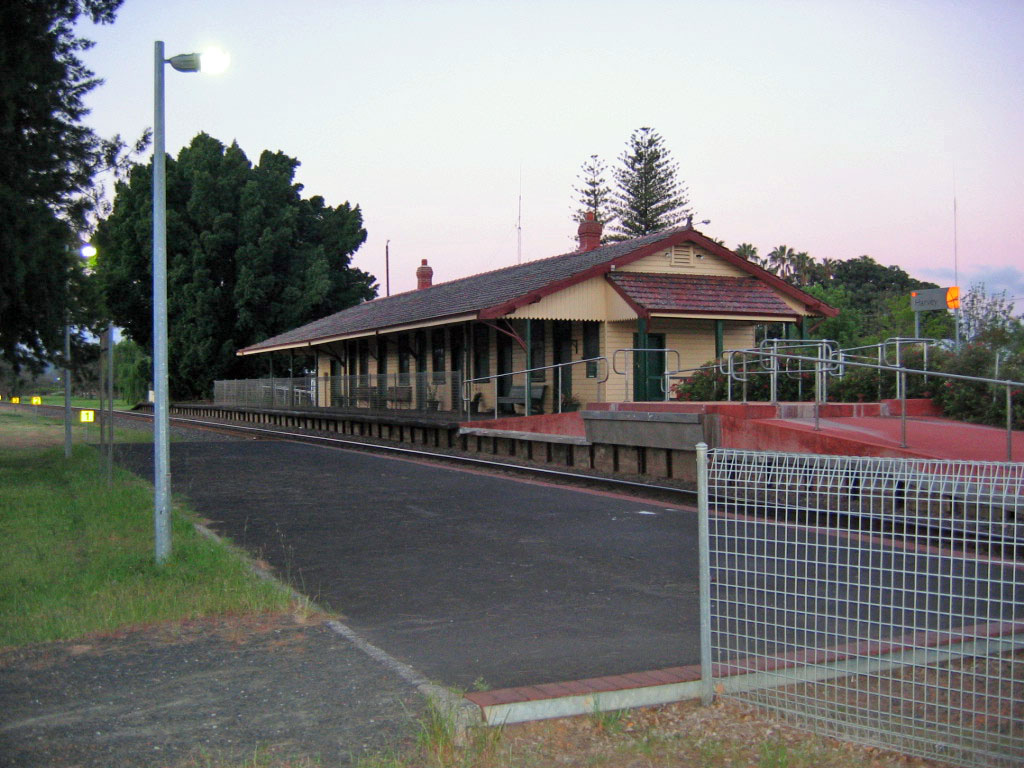
Harvey station in October 2006

== History ==
The South-Western Railway Act 1891 (54 Vict. No. 14), an act by the Parliament of Western Australia granted assent on 26 February 1891, authorised the construction of the railway line from Bayswater to Bunbury.

=== Construction ===
The South Western Railway was constructed for the Western Australian Government Railways (WAGR) by various private contractors from 1891. Among these was the engineer and magistrate William W. L. Owen.

Construction was completed in two parts. The first, East Perth to Pinjarra, was undertaken by William Atkins (former mill manager of the Neil McNeil company at the Jarrahdale Timber Station) and Robert Oswald Law (who built the Fremantle Long Jetty) from the end of 1891. Work began in 1892 but was slowed by difficulties with building the bridge over the Swan River. This section opened on 22 May 1893.

The second phase of construction was also completed by Atkins and McNeil, starting at Bunbury and working north to Pinjarra opening on 22 August 1893. Bunbury station was opened by John Forrest on 14 November 1894.

=== Post-World War II improvements ===
Prior to 1938, the WAGR determined that the South Western Railway would soon reach saturation point. During World War II, plans for its full duplication between Armadale and Brunswick Junction were therefore included in an intended post-war improvement project.

A special committee later recommended, however, that the proposed duplication be replaced with centralized traffic control (CTC), and in 1944 that recommendation was confirmed by the WAGR's newly appointed Signal and Telegraph Engineer, who had gained experience with CTC while working for the New Zealand Railways Department.

In 1949, the plans for lengthy duplication of the line were shelved, and installation of CTC was approved. The incoming WAGR Commission later placed orders for the necessary materials.

Post-war improvements to the WAGR network as a whole also encompassed a major program for relaying track on various main and secondary lines with heavier, welded, rails; included in that program were rerailing, reballasting and ancillary works on the South Western Railway.

The first part of that line to be relayed was the 132-kilometre-long (82 mi) Armadale to Picton Junction section, on which work began in 1952 and was completed in 1954. Work on the 8-kilometre (5 mi) section between Picton Junction and Bunbury followed in 1960, and then the double track section in Perth's south eastern suburbs equivalent to 55 kilometres (34 mi) was relaid in 1961 and 1962.

Meanwhile, installation of CTC equipment began with the equipping of a pilot section between Armadale and Byford in 1958. The CTC was then extended progressively southwards, to North Dandalup by April 1959, and then to Pinjarra, including a crossing loop at Venn, by June 1959.

Proposals for a 7.9-kilometre (4.9 mi) extension of the double tracked Perth suburban portion of the line from Armadale as far as Byford, and installation of the CTC all the way to Brunswick Junction, both ended up being abandoned due to a shortage of funds. Even so, the truncated 63-kilometre-long (39 mi) project, when it entered fully into service, was the first large-scale application of CTC in Australia.

== Alignment ==
As operated by the WAGR, the line was 185.4 kilometres (115.18 mi) from Perth to Bunbury. Since that time, the line has been shortened to 181 kilometres (112 mi) as some stations have closed, moved or been replaced by passing loops.

The first 30 kilometres (19 mi) of the line from Perth are served by Transperth's Armadale Line. This section is double-tracked and electrified using 25 kV AC. The line south of Armadale is not electrified and predominantly single-track, with passing loops at various locations. The section from Perth to Mundijong Junction is controlled by the Public Transport Authority, with the remainder of the line controlled by Arc Infrastructure.

The section controlled by Arc Infrastructure has been upgraded to accommodate 21-tonne (46-thousand-pound) axle loads, featuring concrete sleepers and continuous welded 50 kilograms per metre (100 lb/yd) rail.

=== Bridges ===
The Bunbury Bridge near Perth was the most significant engineering structure on the line. It was replaced by the Goongoongup Bridge in 1996. Other notable bridges include:

- Jenna Bidi Bridge over the Canning River in Gosnells
- Murray River Bridge south of Pinjarra
- Harvey River Bridge north of Harvey
- Collie River Bridge south of Roelands

=== Branches ===
The line connects with all Transperth commuter rail lines at Perth, with specific branches to the Midland, Airport and Ellenbrook lines at Claisebrook and the Thornlie–Cockburn line at Kenwick.

In terms of key freight connectivity, the line branches to the Kwinana Line at Kenwick and Mundijong Junction. The Jarrahdale branch was accessed at Mundijong, but this line is now out of service. A branch south of Pinjarra serves Alcoa and provides access to the Hotham Valley branch. The Collie branch connects at Brunswick Junction, providing access to Worsley Alumina and Collie. At Picton the line once continued 200 kilometres (120 mi) south as the Northcliffe branch, with further branches to Flinders Bay and Katanning, however only the first few kilometres of this line remain in use. A 10-kilometre (6.2 mi) spur to Bunbury Harbour provides access to the port west of Picton.

==== Timber tramways ====
Several timber mills used to operate along the railway, each with their own access to the mainline. Many of these mills operated extensive timber tramways that fed significant quantities of timber to the railway.

== Operations ==
=== Passenger ===
The Transperth commuter rail Armadale Line operates a frequent electric passenger service along the railway from Perth to Byford.

Beyond Byford, the only passenger service on the line is The Australind. It has been closed since November 2023 due to upgrade works on the Armadale Line section, and is due to resume with new rolling stock on 29 June 2026. Before its temporary closure, it traversed the entire length of the line from Perth to Bunbury twice a day in each direction, taking about 2 hours and 30 minutes each way. Other named trains that previously operated on the line were the Bunbury Belle and The Shopper.

==== Stations ====
There are currently 31 passenger stations on the line, of which 20 are served by Armadale Line services. Beyond the Armadale Line section, all stations meet Disability Discrimination Act standards. The stations at Brunswick Junction and Bunbury provide connections to Transwa coach services.

=== Freight ===
Freight services on the line are operated by Aurizon and are primarily focused on bauxite and alumina mining and refining. Bulk bauxite is carried from Alcoa Pinjarra to Kwinana for export and bulk alumina is transported from Alcoa Wagerup as well as from Worsley Alumina to Bunbury port. Caustic soda is transported from Bunbury Port to Wagerup and Worsley for use in alumina refining and some coal from the Collie branch is also carried on the line. Potential exists for the line to carry mineral sands, agricultural produce, lithium ore and containerised freight on the line in the future.

== See also ==
- Railways in Perth
