= Cookernup, Western Australia =

Cookernup
- Town
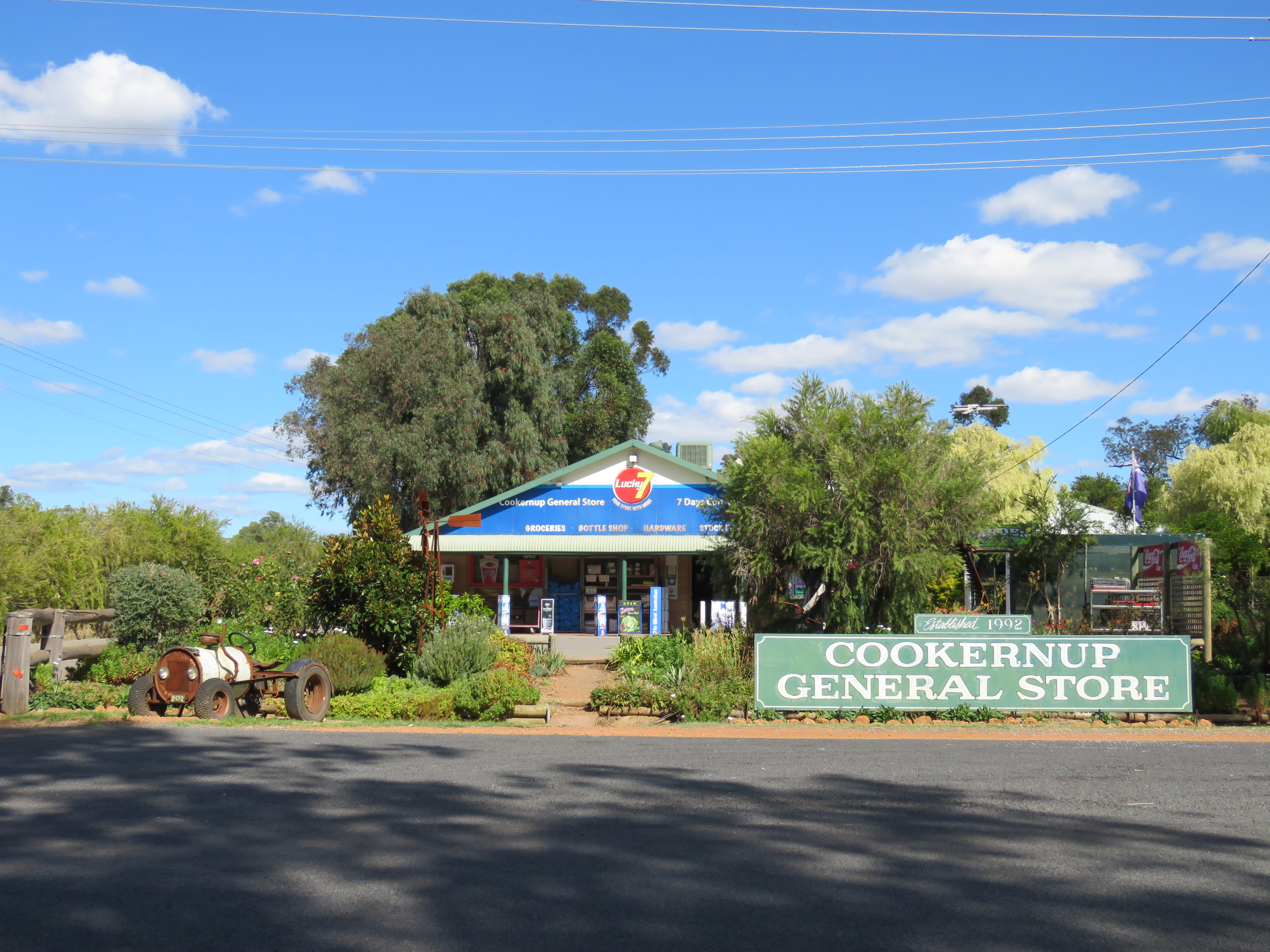
- The Cookernup General Store in April 2022

- Interactive map of Cookernup
- Coordinates: 32.99°S 115.893°E
- Country: Australia
- State: Western Australia
- LGA: Shire of Harvey
- Location: 131 km (81 mi) from Perth; 13 km (8.1 mi) from Harvey
- Established: 1860s

Government
  - State electorate: Murray-Wellington
  - Federal division: Forrest

Area
  - Total: 82.5 km^{2} (31.9 sq mi)

Population
  - Total: 435 (UCL 2021)
- Postcode: 6219

Cookernup is a town in the South West region of Western Australia near the South Western Highway, between Waroona and Harvey.

== History ==
In 1835 Stephen Henty and Thomas Peel were the first Europeans to visit the area, being guided through the reaches of the Harvey River by local Aboriginal people.

Cookernup's name derives from an Aboriginal name meaning "the place of the swamp hen" (cooki). The first settler, Joseph Logue, came to the area in 1852 with his extended family in search of good farming land, acquiring a 9,000-hectare (22,000-acre) grant which he called Kookernup. He later settled on the north bank of a nearby brook, now called Logue Brook.

The area was important in the milling and transport of local timber, with a railway reserve being constructed for timber stacking. In the early 1890s, Cookernup had a much greater population than Harvey, and had a school and telegraph office several years earlier.

The population of the town was 59 (35 males and 24 females) in 1898.

== Present day ==
Cookernup is a small agricultural town with services offered from nearby Harvey, and there have been applications for subdivision in the area. However, a 5-kilometre (3.1 mi) buffer zone around the Alcoa Wagerup alumina refinery was doubled by the Health Department following the approval of a $1.5 billion expansion to the refinery. In August 2008, Alcoa had bought over 40 local properties. As of 2015, Alcoa's purchases made little to no impact to Cookernup, with the majority of properties being purchased in nearby Yarloop.

Cookernup has experienced steady growth in recent years, with several houses being built a year. Cookernup has a fire brigade, town hall, general store, large exercise area and playground.

Nearby Logue Brook Dam, 6 kilometres (3.7 mi) to the east and set in jarrah forests on the western boundary of the Murray State Forests, has a number of camping, accommodation and recreational facilities, and offers bushwalking, horse-riding, waterskiing, canoeing and ropes courses.

Warawarrup is a small village 5 kilometres (3.1 mi) to the south that is home to the Harvey Trotting Track. It was originally planned as a growth area, but the growth failed to eventuate.

== Transport ==
The town serves as a stop on the Australind passenger train service from Perth to Bunbury.

Preceding station	Transwa	Following station
Yarloop towards Perth	Australind (closed until early 2026)	Harvey towards Bunbury
