= WAGR ADE/ADT class =

Former railcars in Western Australia

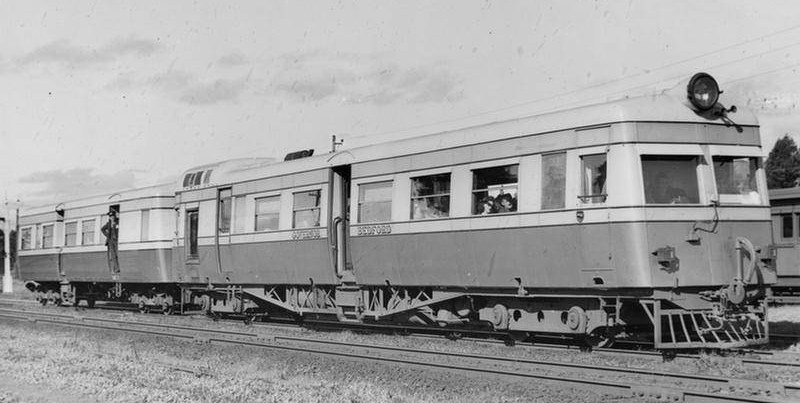
- ADE 451 and ADT 7 at Midland in 1939
- Stock type: Diesel railcar
- In service: 1937-1962
- Manufacturers: ADE: WG Armstrong; ADT: Midland Railway Workshops
- Entered service: ADE: 1937; ADT: 1939
- Number built: ADE: 6; ADT: 6
- Number preserved: 1
- Number scrapped: 11
- Formation: ADE or ADE+AG "Gilbert" car trailer until 1939; ADE+ADT
- Fleet numbers: ADE: 446-451; ADT: 7-12
- Capacity: ADE: 40 seats; ADT: 36 seats
- Operator: WAGR

Specifications
- Car body construction: Steel clad
- Train length: 117 ft (35.66 m)
- Car length: ADE: 60 ft (18.29 m); ADT: 52 ft (15.85 m)
- Width: 8 ft 10 in (2.69 m)
- Height: ADE: 12 ft 3 3/4 in (3.75 m); ADT: 11 ft 4 in (3.45 m)
- Floor height: 3 ft 6 5/8 in (1.08 m) loaded
- Doors: 1 per side (ADE and ADT)
- Wheelbase: ADE: 42 ft (12.80 m) bogie centres; ADT: 37 ft (11.28 m) bogie centres
- Weight: ADT: 11 long tons 13 cwt (11.84 t)
- Prime mover: Saurer
- Engine type: 6 cylinder
- Power output: 140 horsepower at 1400rpm
- Track gauge: 1,067 mm (3 ft 6 in)

The WAGR ADE class (also known as the Governor class) was a six member class of diesel railcars operated by the Western Australian Government Railways between 1937 and 1962.

== History ==
In December 1937, WG Armstrong, Newcastle upon Tyne delivered the first ADE railcar. It was the first diesel-electric rail vehicle to enter service in Australia. It was followed in 1938 by a further five that were delivered in knocked down form and assembled at the Midland Railway Workshops. All were named after Governors of Western Australia, hence the class name.

Number	Name
ADE446	Governor Stirling
ADE447	Governor Lawley
ADE448	Governor Hutt
ADE449	Governor Weld
ADE450	Governor Hampton
ADE451	Governor Bedford

It soon became apparent that the railcars had insufficient capacity so five AG "Gilbert" carriages were adapted as trailers cars as an interim solution, pending six ADT trailers being delivered by the Midland Railway Workshops in late 1939.

They operated on services from Perth to Merredin via Wyalkatchem, Perth to Merredin via the York-Bruce Rock line, Perth to Katanning, Bunbury to Northcliffe, Busselton and Donnybrook, and Geraldton to Mullewa and Yuna. An additional introduced from Geraldton to Ajana in July 1943.

In 1949/50, they were displaced by the Wildflower class diesel railcars and sent to operate services in more remote parts of the state. Withdrawals commenced in 1957, with the last withdrawn in April 1962. After being stored at Midland Railway Workshops, most were scrapped in 1974.

ADT 9 and ADT 12 survive. ADT 9 was used as an office at the Mary Springs lead mine off the North West Coastal Highway, north of the Murchison River. In 2002, it was sold and moved to a farm in Northampton. On 27 October 2014, it was relocated to the former Northampton railway station. ADT 12 is on a property near Quairading minus its bogies.

== Sources ==
- Higham, Geoffrey (2007). Marble Bar to Mandurah: A History of Passenger Rail Services in Western Australia (1st ed.). Bassendean: Rail Heritage WA. ISBN 978-0-9803922-0-3. OCLC 271545712. Wikidata Q140375689.
