= Brunswick Junction railway station =

Rural railway station in Australia

Coordinates: 33.2579°S 115.8383°E

Brunswick Junction
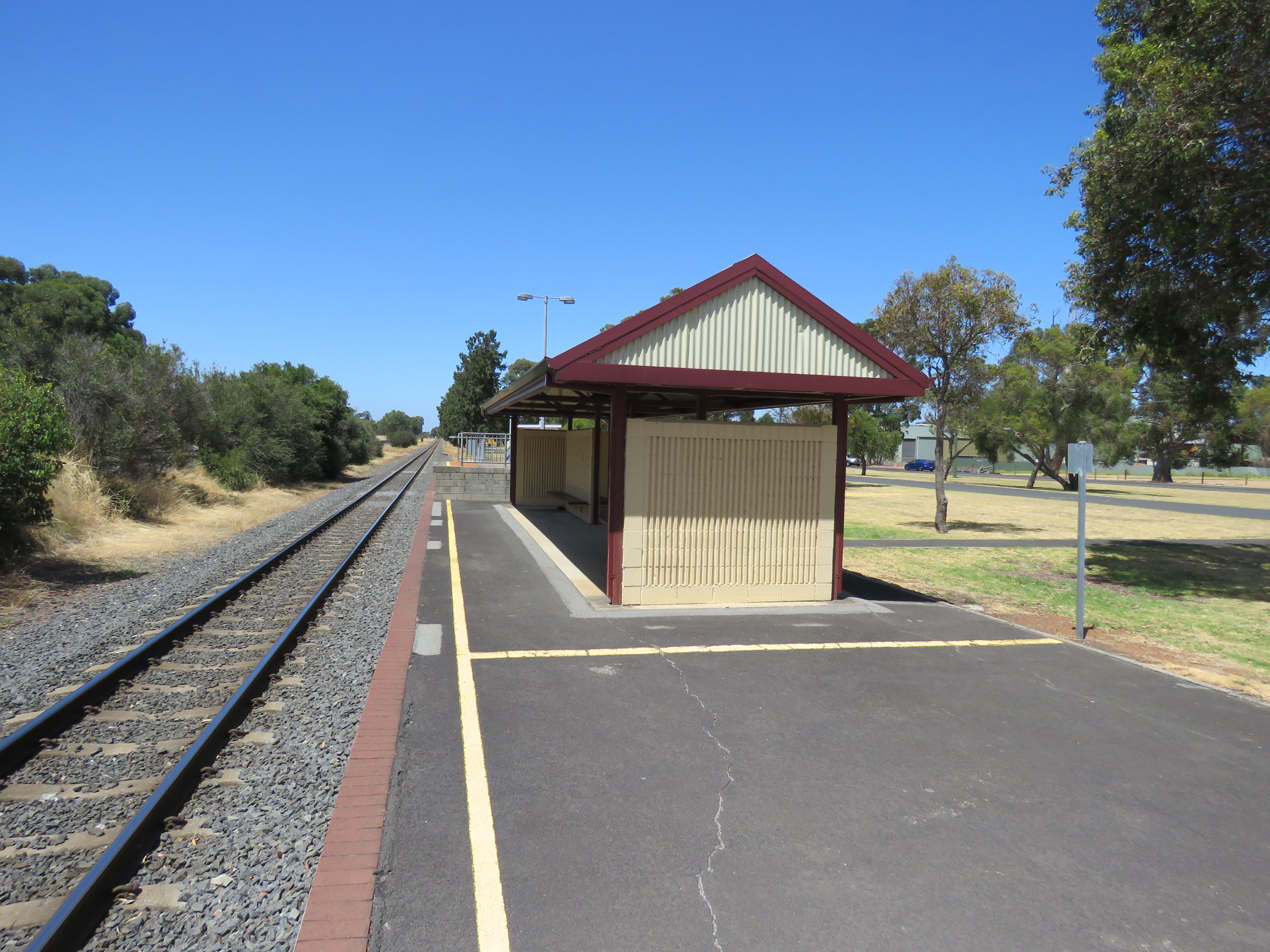
- View of the platform, January 2023

General information
- Location: Ommaney Road, Brunswick; Australia
- Owner: Public Transport Authority
- Operator: Transwa
- Line: South Western
- Platforms: 1
- Tracks: 3

Construction
- Structure type: At-grade

History
- Opened: 1898
- Opening: Mid 2025
- Closed: 20 November 2023 (Temporary)
- Rebuilt: 1941, 1982

Services
Preceding station	Transwa	Following station
Harvey towards Perth	Australind	Bunbury Terminus
Location

Brunswick Junction is a rural railway station serving the town of Brunswick Junction, Western Australia and is the penultimate stop on Transwa's Australind train service.

== History ==
Brunswick Junction opened in 1898, with its station building and interlocking completed in 1899 as a passenger stop on the South Western Railway connecting Perth to Bunbury, as well as the junction for the Brunswick Junction to Narrogin railway line.

The original station building was closed and demolished in 1941 to be replaced by a much larger structure completed in 1942. The new station building had many more amenities than the previous building, including a waiting room and a large signal box.

In 1981, after years of neglect and declining use, the station building was demolished and replaced with a basic shelter, which still stands today. After declining usage in 1988 the Brunswick Junction to Narrogin line was truncated at Collie, where it ends today.
