= Bunbury Belle =

Former rail service in Western Australia

Overview
- Service type: Passenger train
- Status: Ceased
- Locale: South West Western Australia
- First service: 6 June 1964
- Last service: 27 July 1975
- Former operator: Western Australian Government Railways

Route
- Termini: Perth; Bunbury
- Distance travelled: 167 kilometres
- Train number: 20/11
- Line used: South Western

The Bunbury Belle was a passenger train operated by the Western Australian Government Railways between Perth and Bunbury via the South Western line from June 1964 until July 1975.

== History ==
The Bunbury Belle commenced operating on 6 June 1964 between Perth and Bunbury with Wildflower class railcars. It ceased on 27 July 1975, being replaced by road coaches. It operated on weekends only.

== Sources ==
- Higham, Geoffrey (2007). Marble Bar to Mandurah: A History of Passenger Rail Services in Western Australia (1st ed.). Bassendean: Rail Heritage WA. ISBN 978-0-9803922-0-3. OCLC 271545712. Wikidata Q140375689.

== See also ==
- The Shopper
