= Pinjarra railway station =

Railway station in Western Australia

Pinjarra
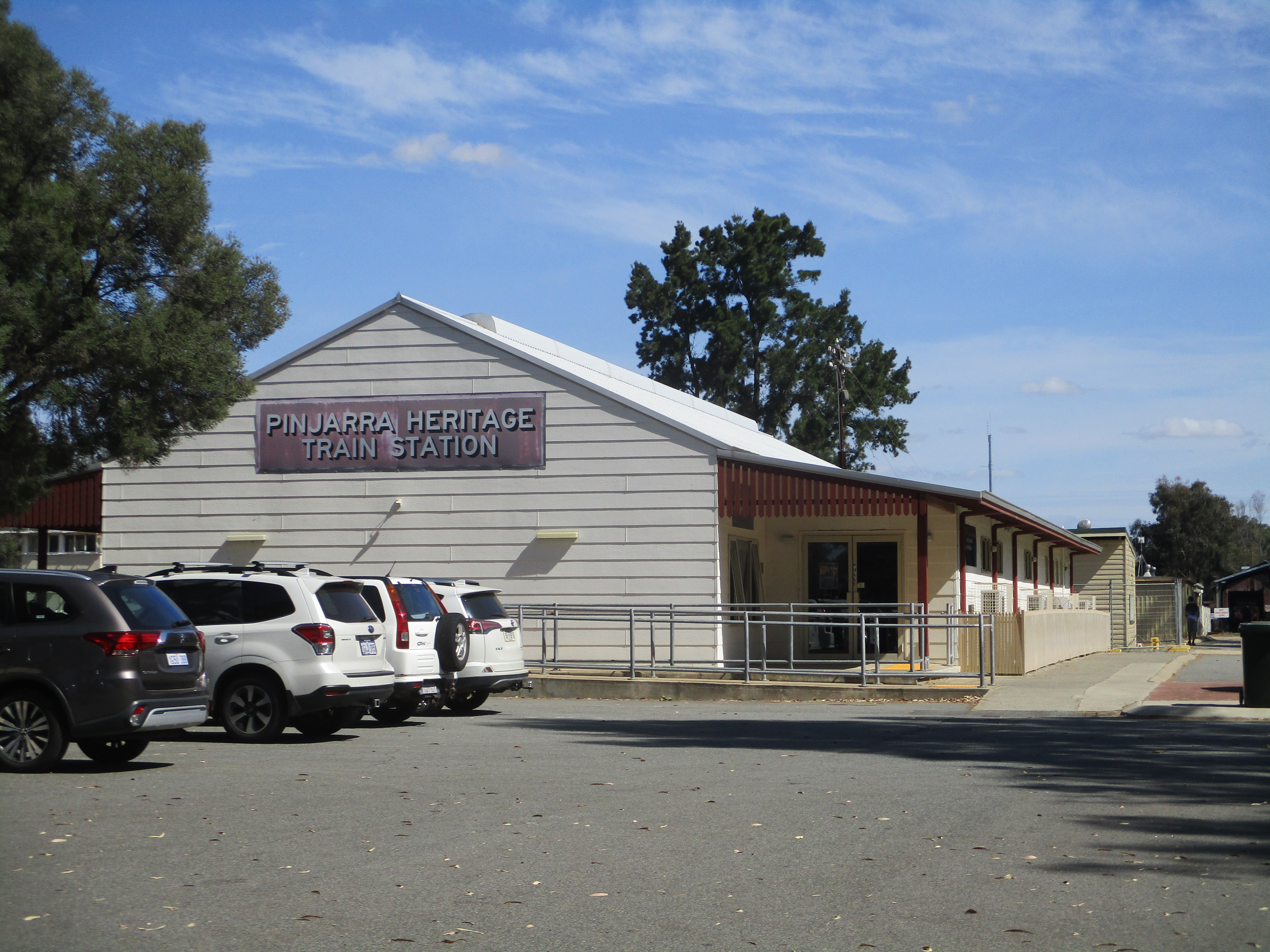
- Pinjarra railway station building in 2019

General information
- Location: South Western Highway, Pinjarra; Australia
- Coordinates: 32.62818°S 115.88027°E
- Owner: Public Transport Authority
- Operator: Transwa
- Line: South Western
- Distance: 86 kilometres (53 mi) from Perth
- Platforms: 1
- Tracks: 2

Construction
- Structure type: Ground
- Accessible: Yes

History
- Opened: 22 May 1893
- Rebuilt: 2007

Services
Preceding station	Transwa	Following station
North Dandalup towards Perth	Australind	Waroona towards Bunbury

Western Australia Heritage Register
- Official name: Pinjarra Railway Yards
- Type: State Registered Place
- Designated: 12 May 2000
- Reference no.: 3097
Location

Pinjarra railway station is located on the South Western Railway in Western Australia. It is located at the town of Pinjarra.

== History ==
Pinjarra station opened on 22 May 1893 as the interim terminus of the South Western Railway from Perth. On 22 August 1893, the line was extended to Bunbury. In the early 1900s the station had an island platform and pedestrian bridge as part of the station layout. In 1911, Pinjarra became a junction station with the opening of the Pinjarra to Narrogin railway.

For a period of time, operations of the Hotham Valley Railway extended to its depot opposite the Pinjarra station. Following the cessation of mainline activity by the Hotham Valley Railway, the station and yard are separate from the railway which terminates at Isandra Siding.

In 1986, the station building was destroyed in a fire. A new building was erected in 2007 and housed the Pinjarra Visitor Centre. The station was used by Transwa's twice daily Australind service.
