= Western Australian Government Railways =

Former government railway commission in Western Australia

Agency overview
- Formed: 1 October 1890
- Preceding agency: Department of Works & Railways
- Dissolved: 30 June 2003
- Superseding agency: Public Transport Authority
- Jurisdiction: Western Australia
- Headquarters: Public Transport Centre
- Key document: Government Railways Act 1904 (WA)

Western Australian Government Railways (WAGR) was the state owned operator of railways in the state of Western Australia between October 1890 and June 2003. Owned by the state government, it was renamed a number of times to reflect extra responsibility for tram and ferry operations that it assumed and later relinquished. Westrail was the trading name of the WAGR from September 1975 until December 2000, when the WAGR's freight division and the Westrail brand were privatised. Its remaining passenger operations were transferred to the Public Transport Authority in July 2003.

== History of operations ==
The WAGR had its origins (as Western Australian Railways, or just WAR) in 1879, when the Department of Works and Railways was established.

The first government railway line in Western Australia opened on 26 July 1879, between Geraldton and Northampton. It was followed by the Eastern Railway from Fremantle to Guildford via Perth on 1 March 1881. The WAR adopted the narrow gauge of 3 ft 6 in (1,067 mm) to reduce construction costs.

Over the next few decades, an extensive network of railway lines throughout Western Australia was built, primarily to service the wheatbelt. Prior to the expanded use of road transport, the network was of vital importance in the state, particularly for moving agricultural, forestry and mining products.

In 1890, WAR and the Department of Works and Railways were abolished and replaced by the WAGR and the Department of Works and Buildings (later the Public Works Department).

The WAGR network was joined to that of the rest of mainland Australia, albeit to 4 ft 8 1/2 in (1,435 mm) standard gauge, a different gauge, in October 1917 with the opening of the Commonwealth Railways' Trans-Australian Railway to Kalgoorlie.

Legislative restrictions were implemented to limit competition from road transport, most notably from the 1930s until the 1950s, when the Transport Co-ordination Board kept strict control over commercial road traffic through powers vested by the State Transport Co-ordination Act 1933. As road transportation expanded and losses escalated, many lines closed from 1949.

The network peaked in 1937 at 6,600 kilometres (4,100 mi). Unusually for such a large network, only one tunnel was required, the Swan View Tunnel. A few isolated lines were operated, such as the Marble Bar line in the Pilbara and the Hopetoun to Ravensthorpe railway line on the South Coast. With many lines in need of heavy maintenance, rolling stock in need of replacement and heavy losses being incurred, during the 1950s many branches closed with 1,320 kilometres (820 mi) of the network so treated in 1956–57, although 275 kilometres (171 mi) were subsequently reopened on a seasonal basis.

In the late 1960s, the Eastern and Eastern Goldfields lines between Perth and Kalgoorlie was gauge converted to allow through operation of trains from the eastern states along with the Esperance & Menzies lines, with sections through the Avon River and east of Southern Cross built on new alignments. A concerted program of dieselisation saw diesel locomotives replace the last steam locomotives in March 1972.

In the late 20th century, the end of restrictions on competing road transport resulted in the WAGR and its successors moving from being a small customer-oriented system to a predominantly main line bulk carrier operation. This resulted in many smaller communities losing their facilities. However, in the wheatbelt, bulk handling of grain continued despite the changes.

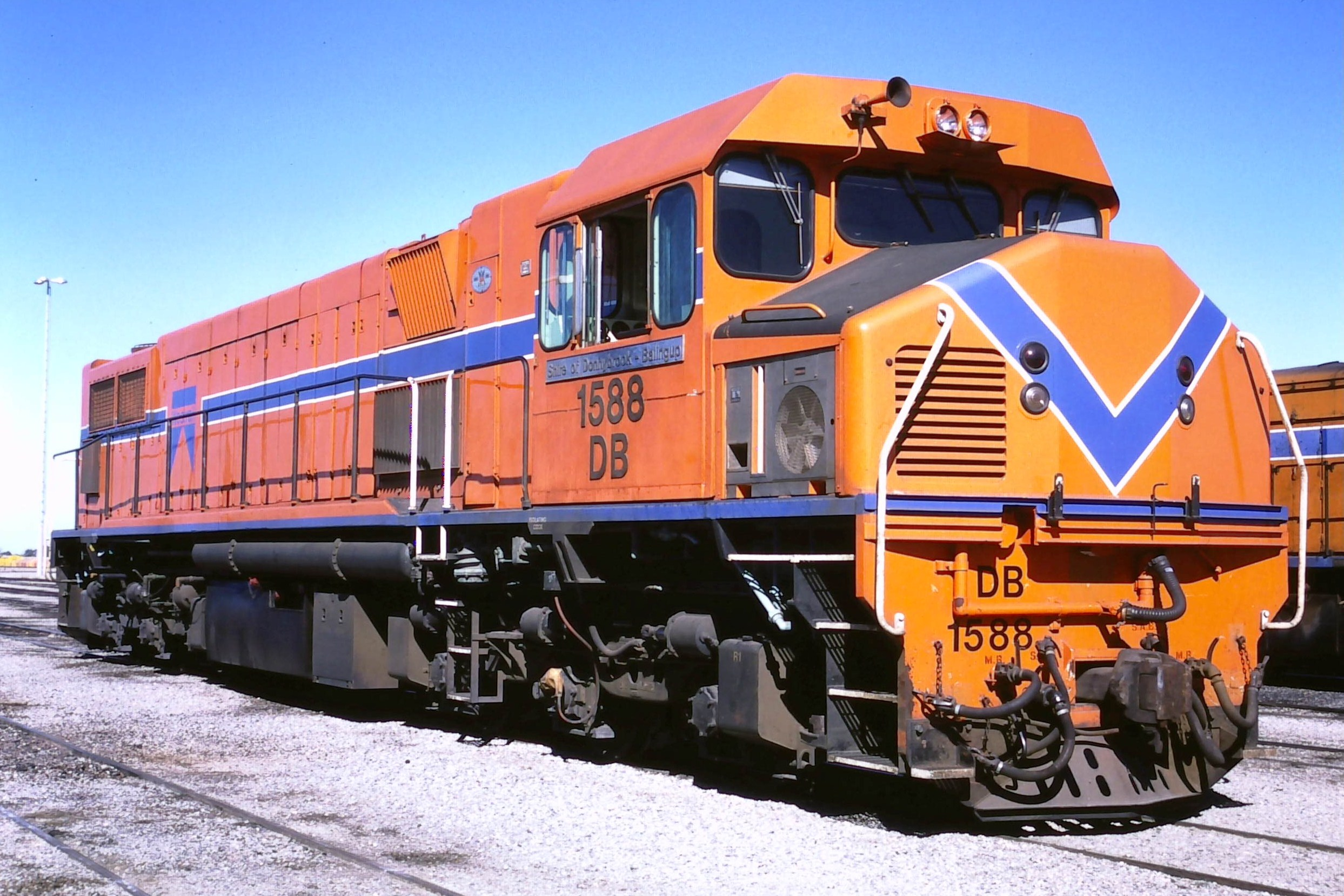
DB1588 Forrestfield, 1986, in the orange and blue livery

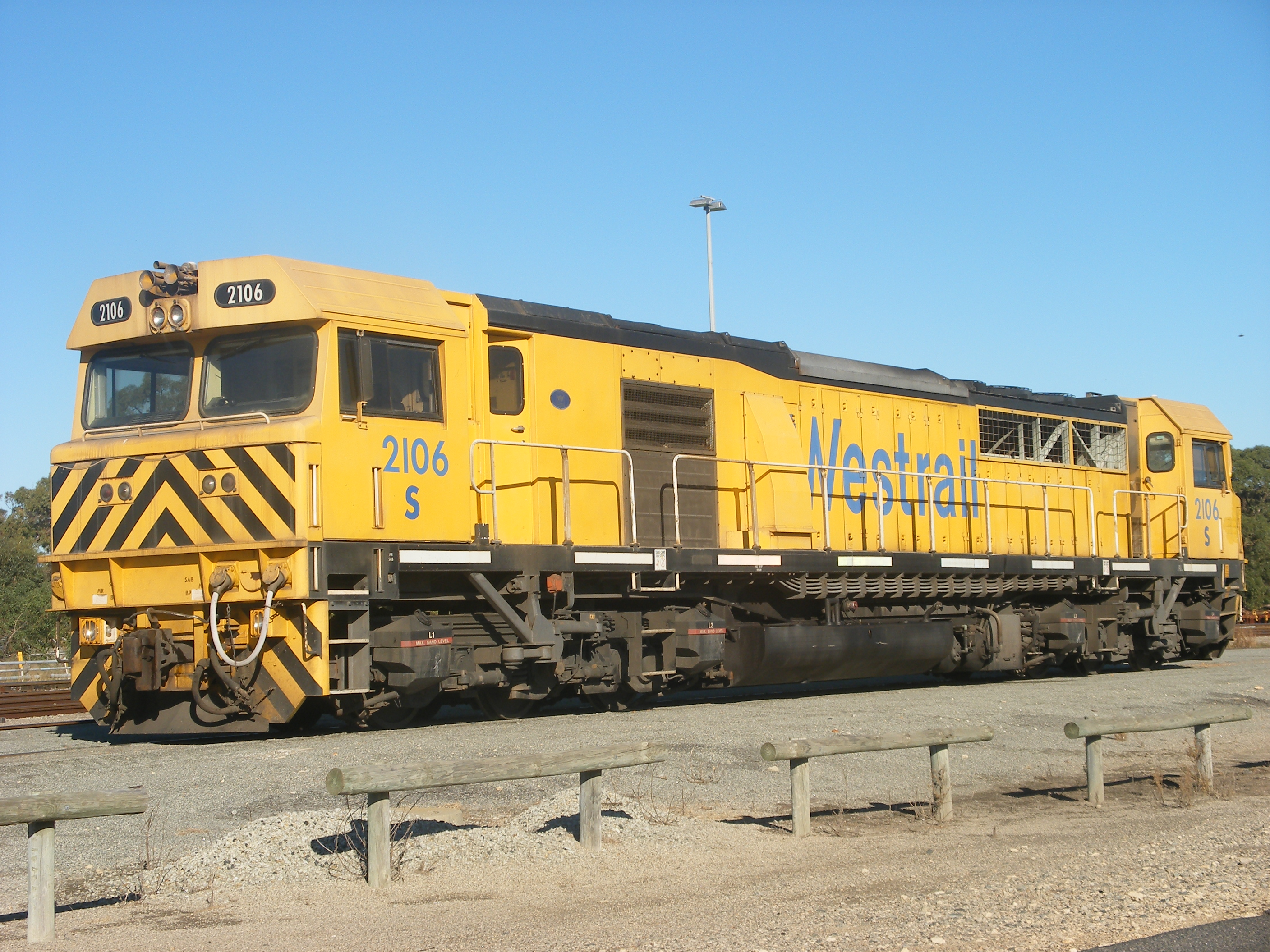
S2106 in the yellow and blue livery

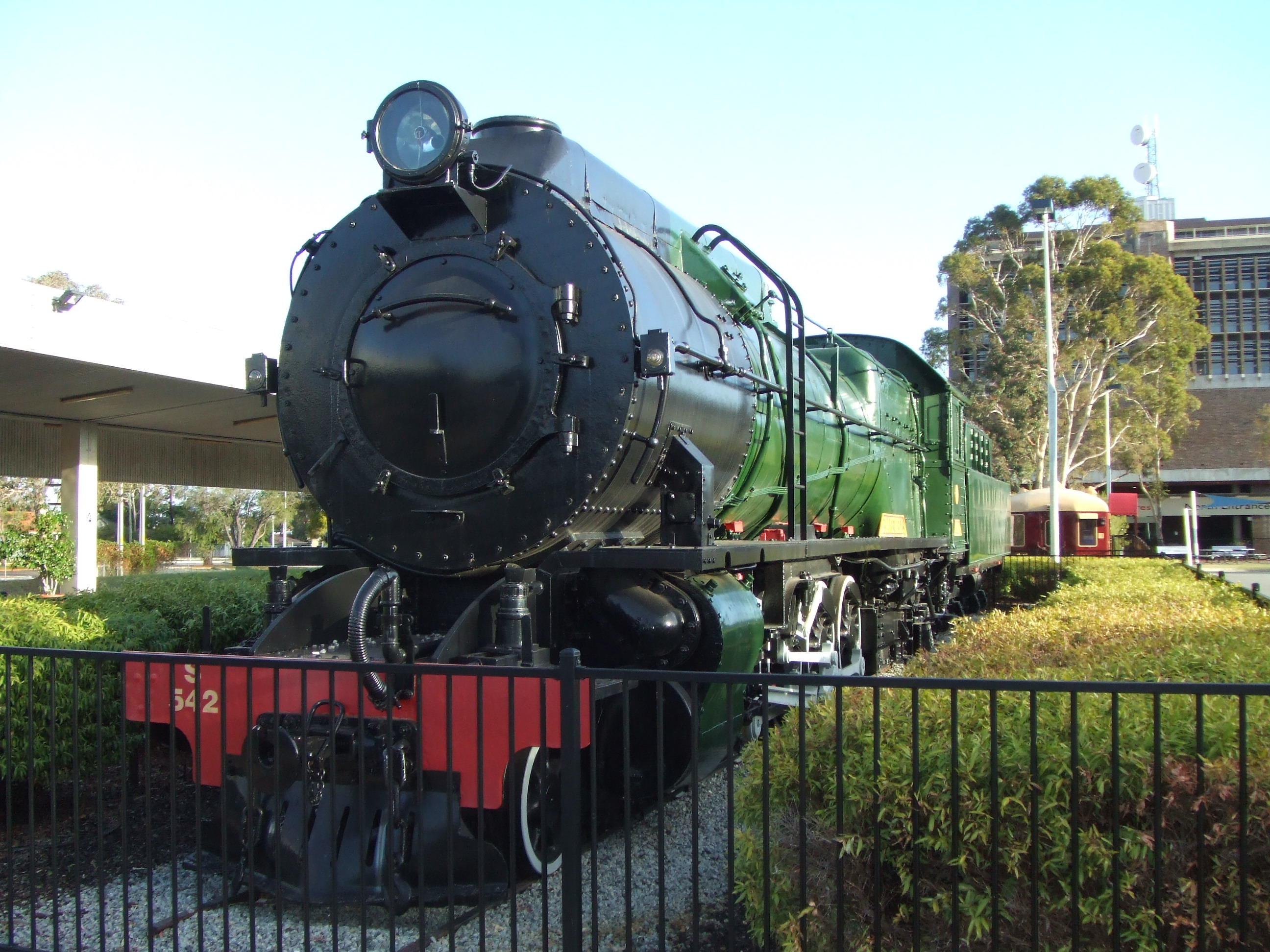
Preserved S542 at the Public Transport Centre in April 2006

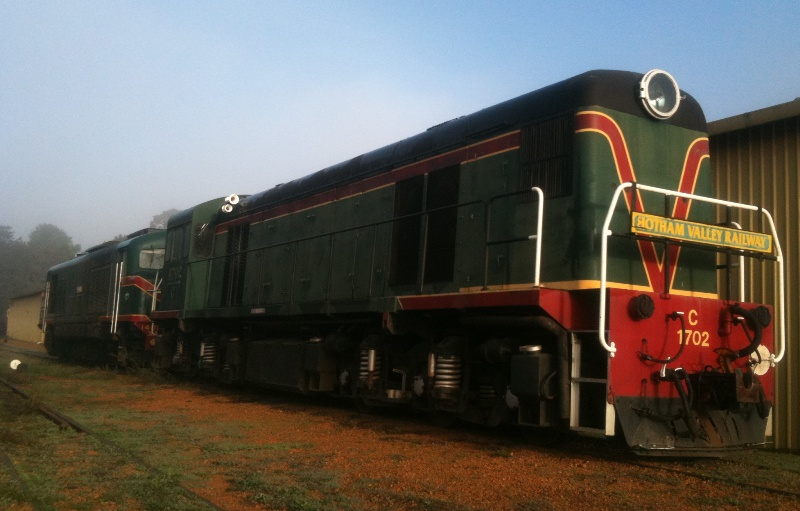
Preserved C1702 at the Hotham Valley Railway in September 2011 in the original diesel livery

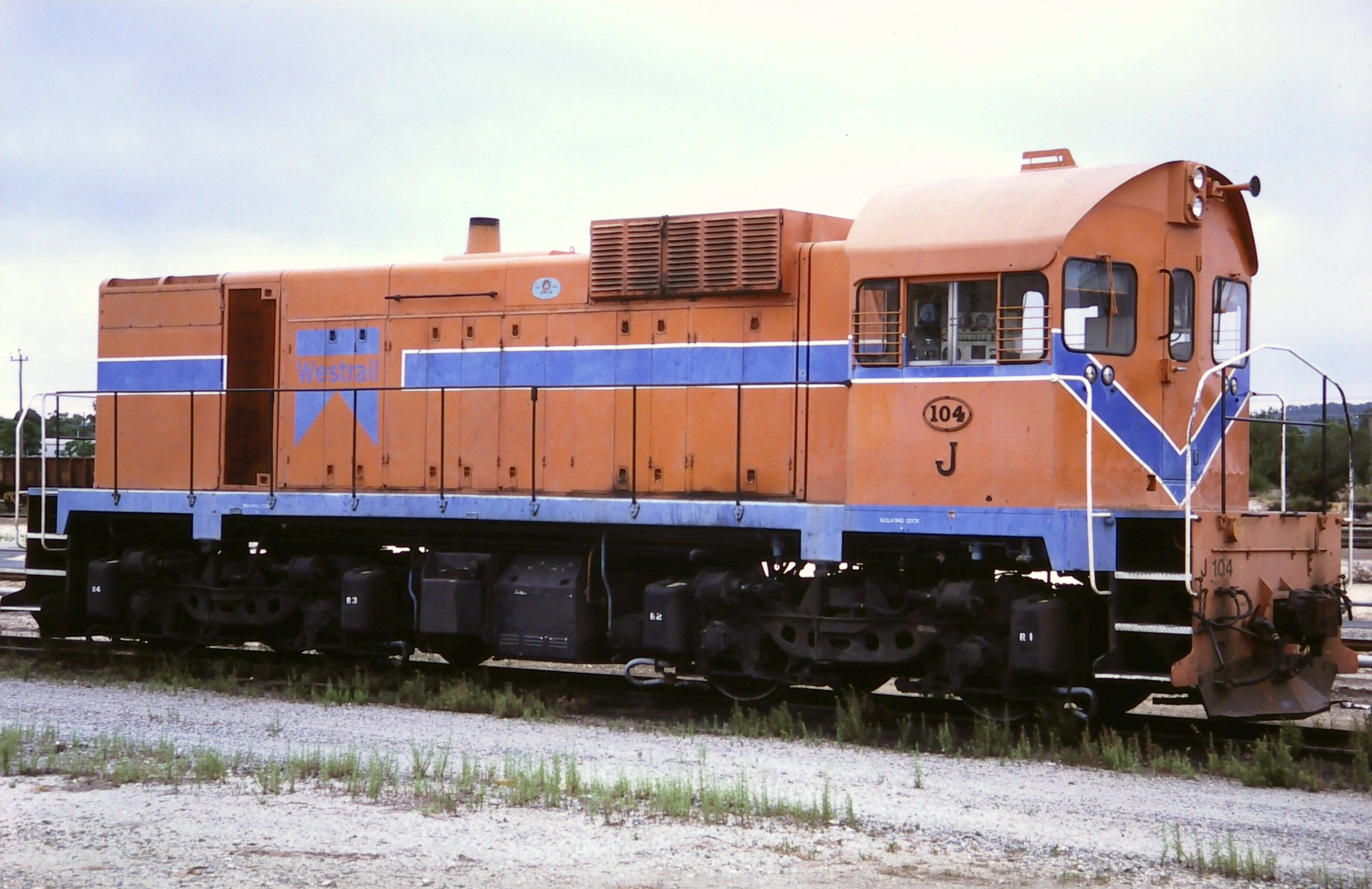
J104 at Forrestfield in March 1986 in Westrail livery

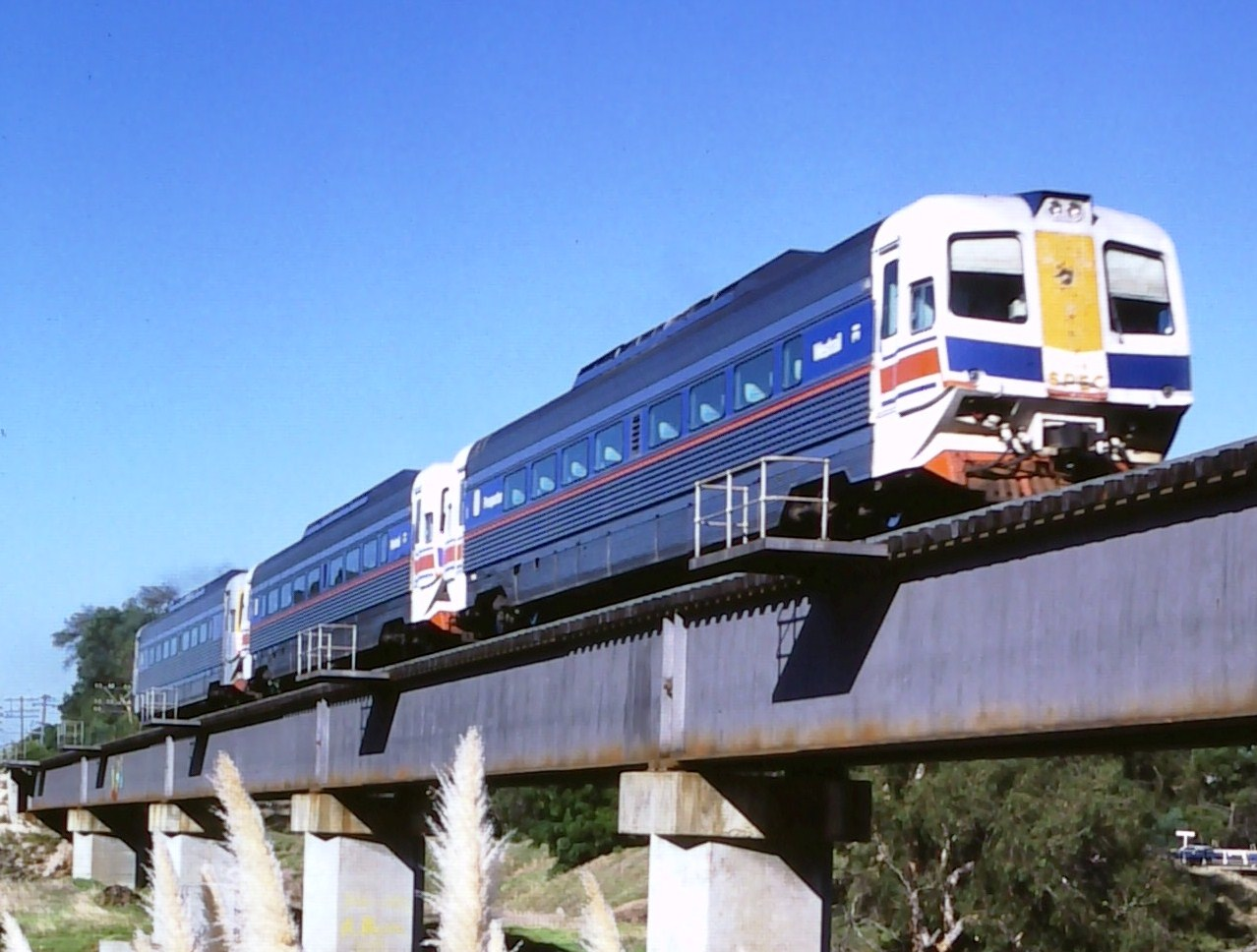
The Prospector crossing the Guildford Railway Bridge in April 1986

=== Westrail ===
In September 1975, the WAGR adopted the trading name Westrail and an associated logo. However, the official name of the WAGR was not changed.

The new name was the main element of a complete program to improve the WAGR's public image. Every visible feature of the organisation was to be associated with the new Westrail identity. The transition from WAGR to Westrail quickly began, with the new name rapidly and almost universally replacing the old one in the vocabulary of staff and the public.

Strong impetus to acceptance of the new corporate identity was given by the completion of a new Westrail office headquarters and passenger facility at East Perth Terminal (then known as Perth Terminal). The new building, named the Westrail Centre, was opened by the Premier of Western Australia, Charles Court, on 12 November 1976.

Westrail was responsible for managing the state's rail infrastructure. It operated urban and regional passenger and freight services throughout Western Australia. In Perth, Westrail provided the metropolitan area rail service, under contract to another arm of the state government. Its country passenger services involved the operation of both trains and road coaches.

In October 1987, it was announced by Premier Brian Burke and Federal Minister for Land Transport & Infrastructure Support, Peter Duncan, that a merger of Westrail with Australian National was being investigated. Nothing ever came of it.

On 17 December 2000, the WAGR's freight division along with the Westrail name and logo were sold to Australia Western Railroad, a subsidiary of the Australian Railroad Group (ARG). The deal also saw the WAGR's freight lines leased to ARG for 49 years.

The WAGR's remaining functions, including owning the rail network and operating regional passenger services, were transferred to the Western Australian Government Railways Commission. On 1 January 2003, the WAGR Commission's functions were absorbed by the Public Transport Authority.

The former Westrail Centre is now known as the Public Transport Centre.

== Names ==
The WAGR was renamed a number of times to reflect extra responsibility for tram and ferry operations that it assumed and later relinquished.

- 1 January 1880 – 30 September 1890: Department of Works & Railways
- 1 October 1890 – 30 June 1914: Western Australian Government Railways (I)
- 1 July 1914 – 30 June 1922: Western Australian Government Railways & Tramways
- 1 July 1922 – 30 June 1930: Western Australian Government Railways, Tramways & Electricity Supply
- 1 July 1930 – 30 June 1946: Western Australian Government Railways, Tramways, Ferries & Electricity Supply
- 1 July 1946 – 21 April 1949: Western Australian Government Railways, Tramways & Ferries
- 22 April 1949 – 16 December 2000: Western Australian Government Railways (II)
- 19 September 1975: WAGR adopted the trading name Westrail
- 17 December 2000: The freight business, Westrail name and a 49-year lease on the network outside of Perth were sold to the Australian Railroad Group. The public entity that continued to operate passenger services was renamed the Western Australian Government Railways Commission (WAGRC).
- 1 July 2003: WAGRC succeeded by Public Transport Authority that today operates services under the Transperth and Transwa brands

== Corporate identity ==
Initially, Westrail applied an orange with blue stripe livery to its locomotives and passenger vehicles. Freight rolling stock and road trucks were painted yellow, and blue was used on all signs, buildings and printed material. The Westrail logo incorporated a stylised ⟨W⟩ surmounted by a solid bar representing a railway track. Between the bar and the ⟨W⟩ was the word ⟨Westrail⟩.

In July 1997, a yellow with blue livery was unveiled when the first Q class diesel-electric locomotive was delivered.

== Inquiries and royal commissions ==
A range of committees of inquiry as well as royal commissions were conducted on aspects of the railways between 1893 and 1959, however to appreciate the number of commissions that had relevance to railway operations, the coal and wheat industries were linked with the railway operations as well. The following are a selected group of commissions:

- Report of the Royal Commission appointed to inquire into the condition and organisation of the railway workshops at Fremantle.
  - Chairperson: Charles Harper.
- Royal Commission on City Railway Traffic 1899
  - Chairperson: H. W. Venn 30/06/1897
- Royal Commission appointed to inquire into the administration of the locomotive branch of the Western Australian Government Railways
  - Chairperson: Richard Speight 23/08/1899
- Royal Commission on charges made against high officials in the service of the Western Australian Government Railways 1906
  - Chairperson: Robert F. McMillan
- Royal Commission on railways 1922
  - Chairperson: George W. Stead
- Report of the Royal Commission appointed to inquire into Australian Standard Garratt Locomotive 1947
  - Chairperson: Albert A. Wolff
- Second interim report of the Royal Commission appointed to enquire into (inter-alia) the supply of local coal to the Western Australian government railways
  - Chairperson: Alexander J. Gibson
- First interim report of the Royal Commission appointed to inquire into the Midland Junction Workshops of the Western Australian Government Railways
  - Chairperson: Alexander J. Gibson
- Report of the Royal Commission appointed to inquire into the management, workings and control of the Western Australian Government Railways
  - Chairperson: Alexander J. Gibson
- Royal Commission appointed to inquire into administration of the Western Australian Government Railways
  - Report on the working of the government railways for quarter ended 30 September 1957
  - Report of the Western Australian Government Railways Commission for the year ended 30 June 1959
  - Chairperson: Alan G. Smith

== Acquisitions ==
The WAGR purchased the Great Southern Railway in December 1896 and the Midland Railway of Western Australia in August 1964.

== Services ==
The WAGR operated a wide variety of services throughout its history, including the more standard country and suburban passenger and freight workings as well as a limited electrified service, early country railcar services, road bus services and overnight sleeper services to distant destinations.

=== Named services ===
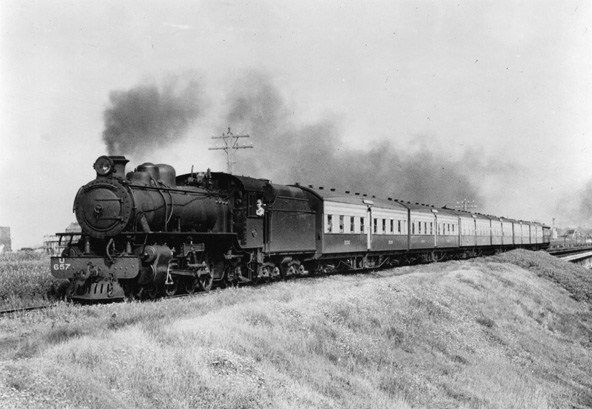
U657 hauling The Australind in 1950

Although some passenger trains were bestowed nicknames, it was not until The Westland was launched in 1938, that a service was officially named. Further trains were named in the 1960s in an effort to increase the prestige of rail travel.

Name	Origin	Destination	Commenced	Ceased
Albany Progress	Perth	Albany	1961	1978
Albany Weekender	Perth	Albany	1964	1975
The Australind	Perth	Bunbury	1947	present
Bunbury Belle	Perth	Bunbury	1964	1975
The Shopper	Perth	Bunbury	1964	1975
The Midlander	Perth	Geraldton	1964	1975
The Westland	Perth	Kalgoorlie	1938	1969
The Kalgoorlie	Perth	Kalgoorlie	1962	1971
The Prospector	East Perth	Kalgoorlie	1971	present
The Mullewa	Perth	Mullewa	1961	1974

=== Unnamed services ===
The WAGR operated services from Perth to many destinations throughout the state. In 1935, it operated 63 sleeper services a week. It also operated local passenger, many operating as mixed trains. The last of these ceased in 1973.

=== Electrified services ===
While the current Perth urban passenger network operated by Transperth is entirely electrified, between May 1924 and March 1969 the State Electricity Commission operated the only electrified line in Western Australia as part of the WAGR network. The line was 800 metres (2,600 ft) in length and operated within the confines of the East Perth Power Station. The electric locomotive used on the railway is preserved at the Western Australian Rail Transport Museum in Bassendean, though is currently not on display.

=== Country diesel railcar services ===
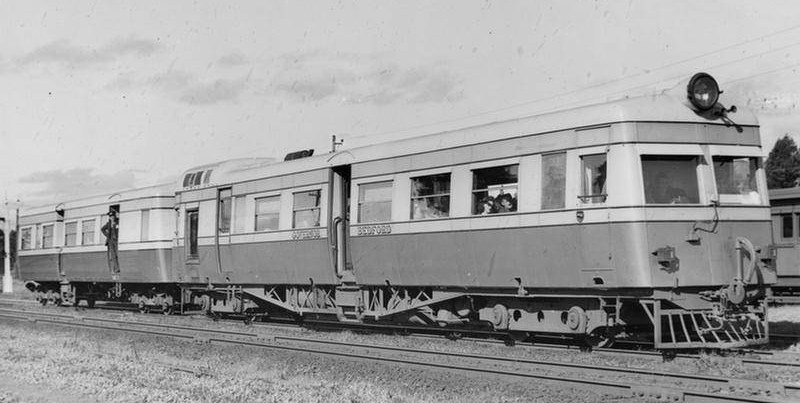
Governor class railcars at Midland Junction in 1939

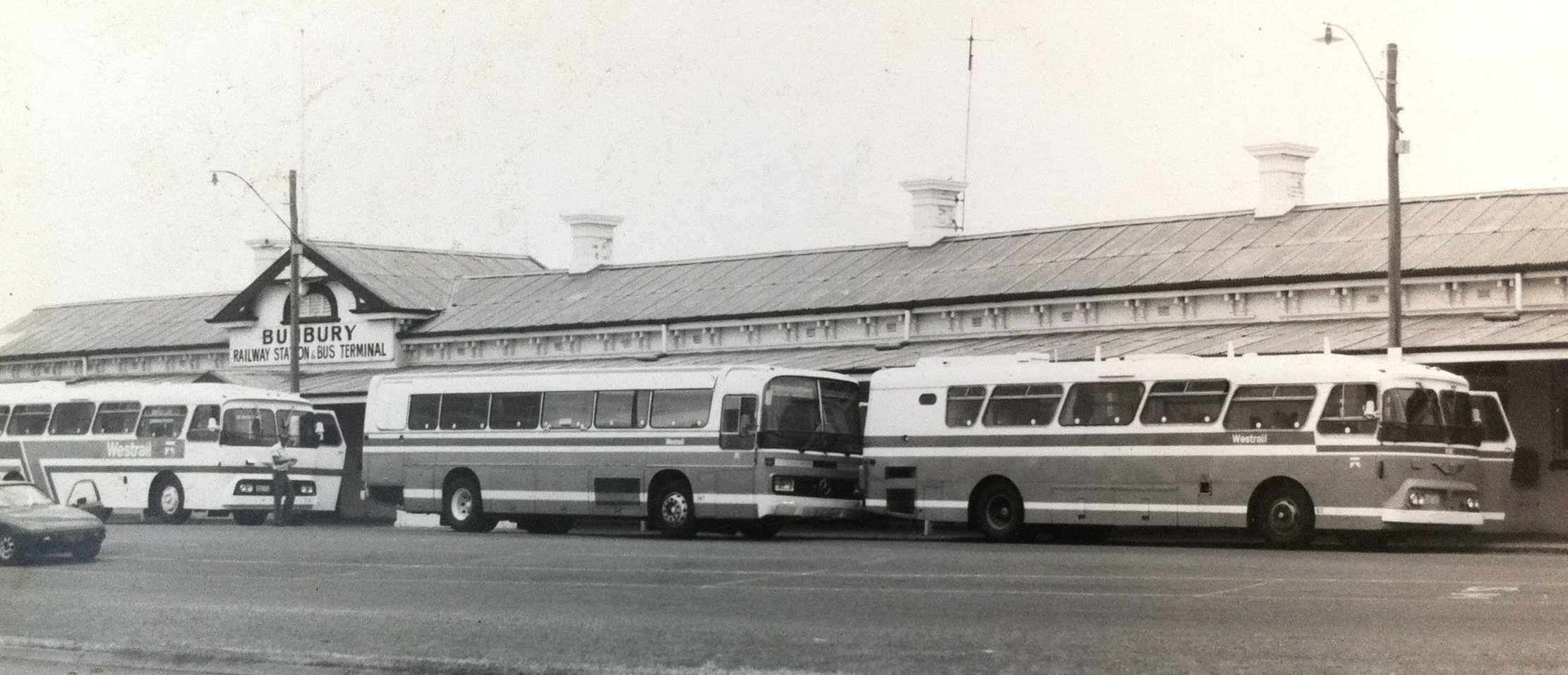
Road coaches outside Bunbury station

In December 1937, the Governor class diesel railcars were introduced on daylight regional services from Perth. The longer distance services remained locomotive hauled.

=== Road bus service ===
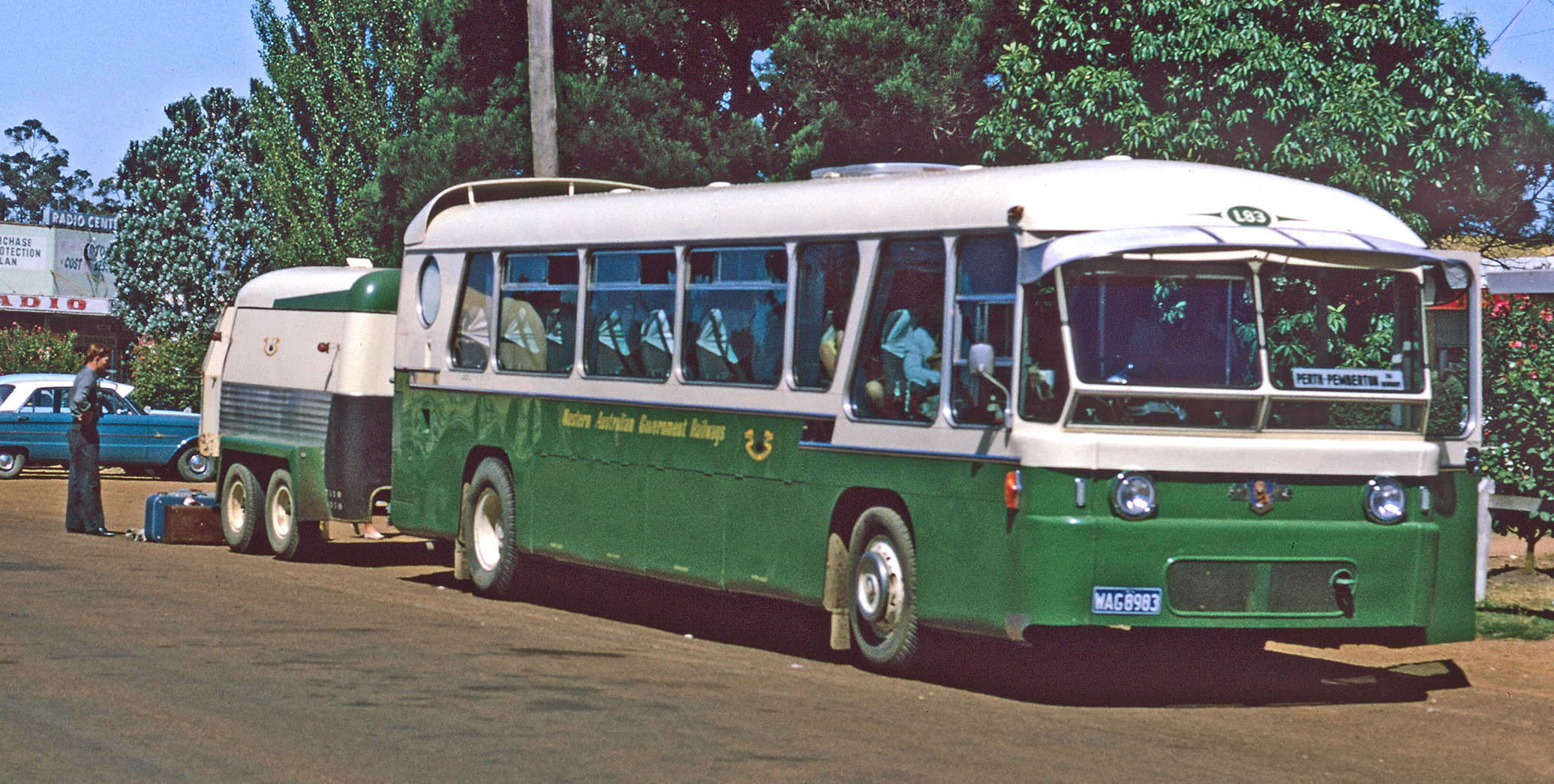
Perth-Pemberton bus service

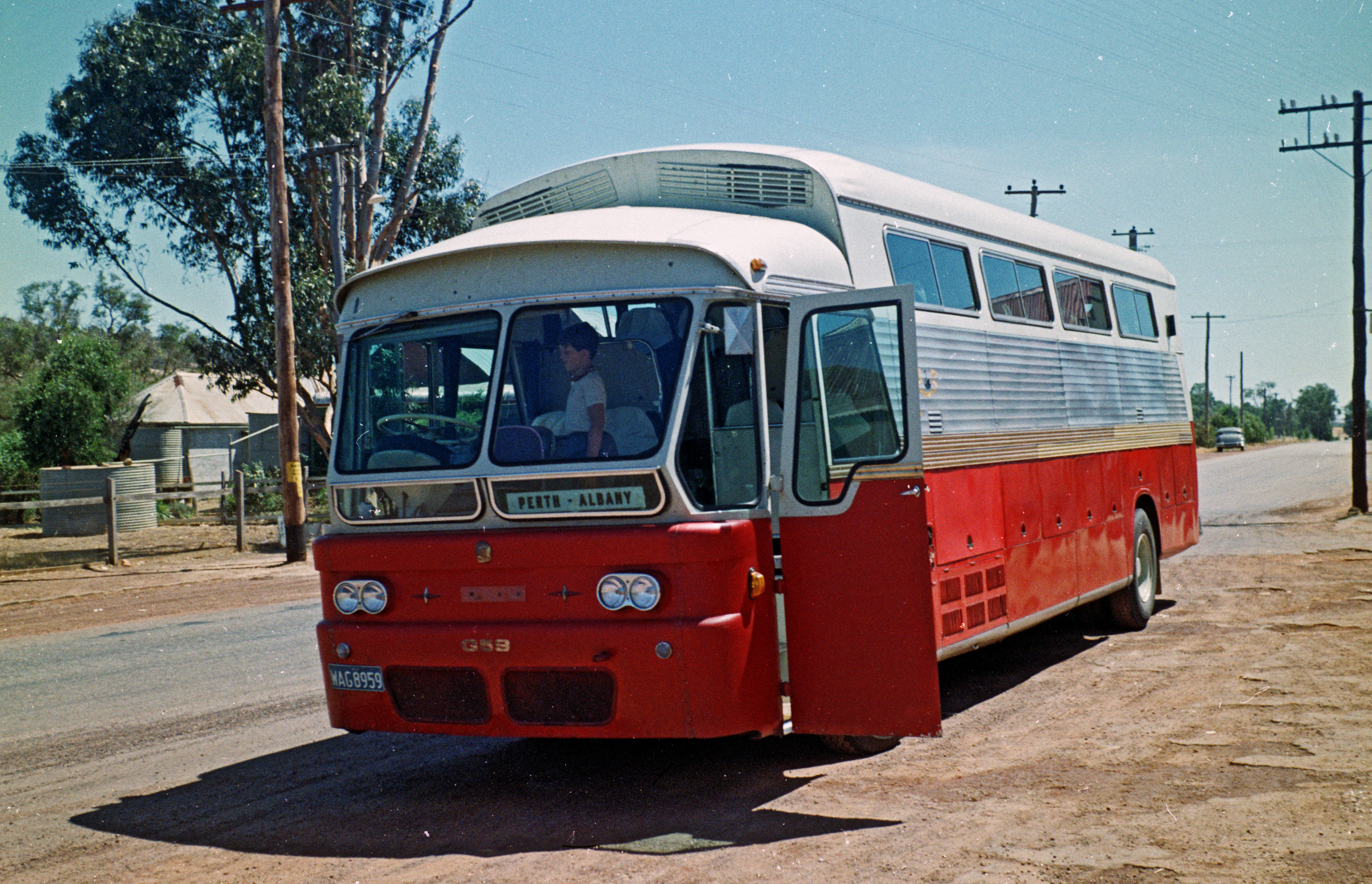
Perth-Albany bus service

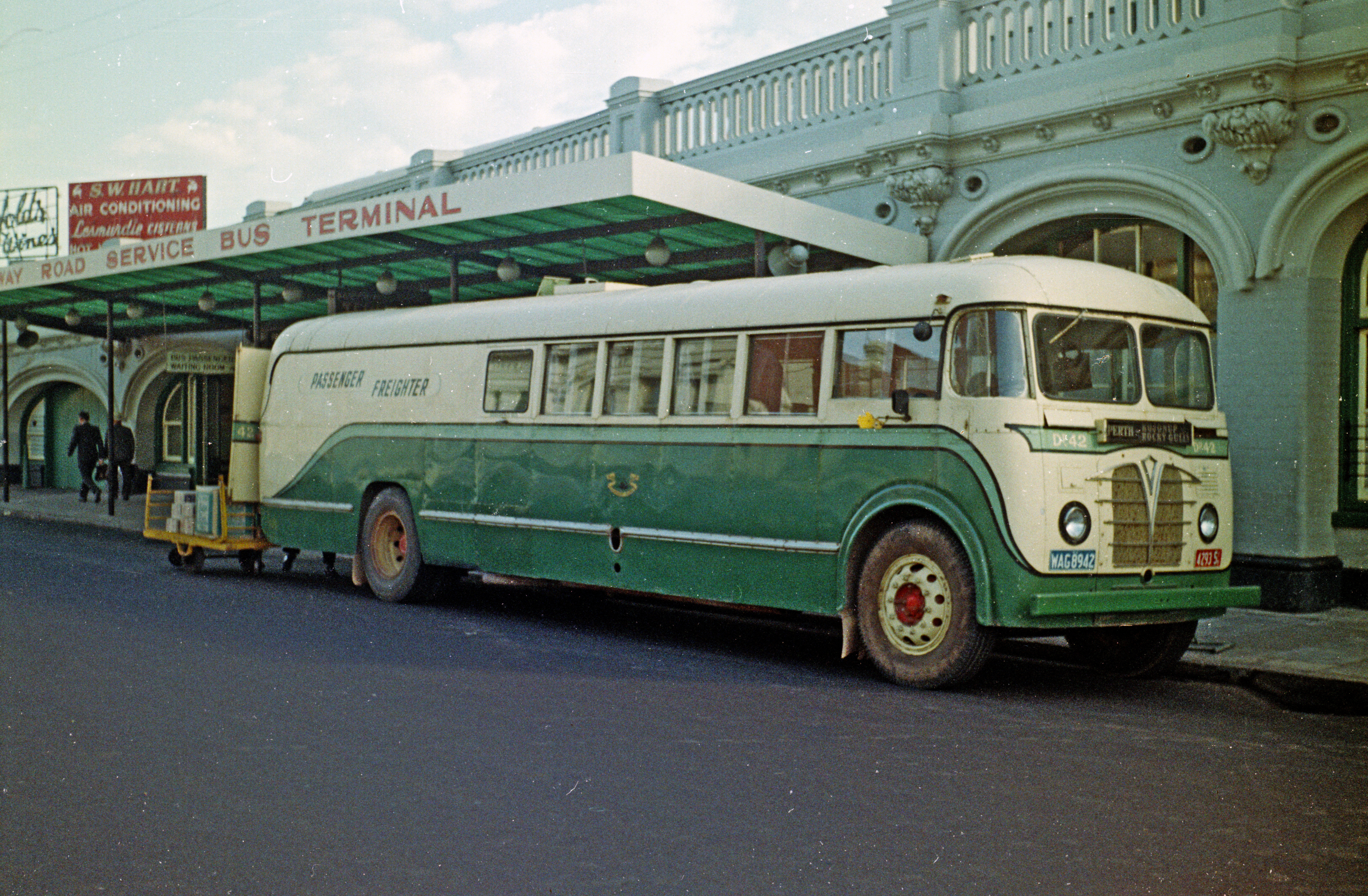
Passenger freighter bus service

Where lines were closed in the 1940s and 1950s, or passenger services discontinued, road bus services were introduced. Most of the services and the same routes continue to the present.

The rail-road services commenced on 24 November 1941 with one vehicle operating a service from Perth to Kojonup via Boddington. By 1949, there were 28 buses, and by 1959 more than fifty. Dual-purpose buses that also carried freight were introduced in 1949. Buses operated included Fodens, articulated trailer buses, AECs, Leyland Lions, Hino RC320Ps and Mercedes-Benz O303s.

In the late 1960s, long-distance coaches operated from Perth to Meekatharra, Esperance, Geraldton and Albany.

In the early 1970s the WAGR Bus service included seasonal six-day Wildflower Study Tours from Perth and along roads to and from Geraldton through the northern wheatbelt. These had first been operated in 1948 by the Midland Railway of Western Australia. Also in the early 1970s, the King Karri Scenicruiser buses ran from Bunbury through Manjimup, Pemberton, Northcliffe and Walpole to Albany at the same time the Albany Progress overnight train was still operating, making it possible to do a round trip by rail from Perth to Albany and bus from Albany to Perth via Bunbury.

In the mid-1970s some services reflected where rail services had either closed or had ceased providing facilities for passengers, the following selection is not the total service at the time.

- Albany-Denmark-Nornalup-Walpole
- Perth-Wooroloo-Wundowie-Northam
- Perth-Toodyay-Goomalling-Wubin-Mount Magnet-Meekatharra
- Wagin-Katanning-Pingrup-Jerramungup

=== Railway road truck services ===
There were also road-freight services, while the restrictions on non-government trucking were still in force, with suburban truck services from Perth to Midland, Fremantle, Kewdale and Gosnells. The country services were extensive having Perth and country rail stations as terminal locations.

=== Reso tours ===
From 1928 until the 1970s (excluding a hiatus from 1929 to c. 1933, due to the Great Depression), WAGR ran "reso tours" as a way of publicising WA's natural resources, and the associated industries. These tours went as far north as Geraldton and east to Kalgoorlie, but most commonly south to the forest areas around Pemberton and that town's timber mills. Tours also covered apple festivals in Bridgetown and Manjimup. The first tour was organised for industry and business leaders from Victoria, but by 1933 they were open to the public and sufficiently popular to have waiting lists.

A defining aspect of the tours was that they included all food and accommodation; passengers slept on the train rather than in a separate hotel, and the trains were referred to as "hotels on wheels". Tours typically ran over a weekend, leaving on Friday evening and returning on Monday morning. There were longer tours; in 1961 an 18-day tour included Geraldton, Kalgoorlie, Bunbury, Katanning and Pemberton.

== Liveries ==
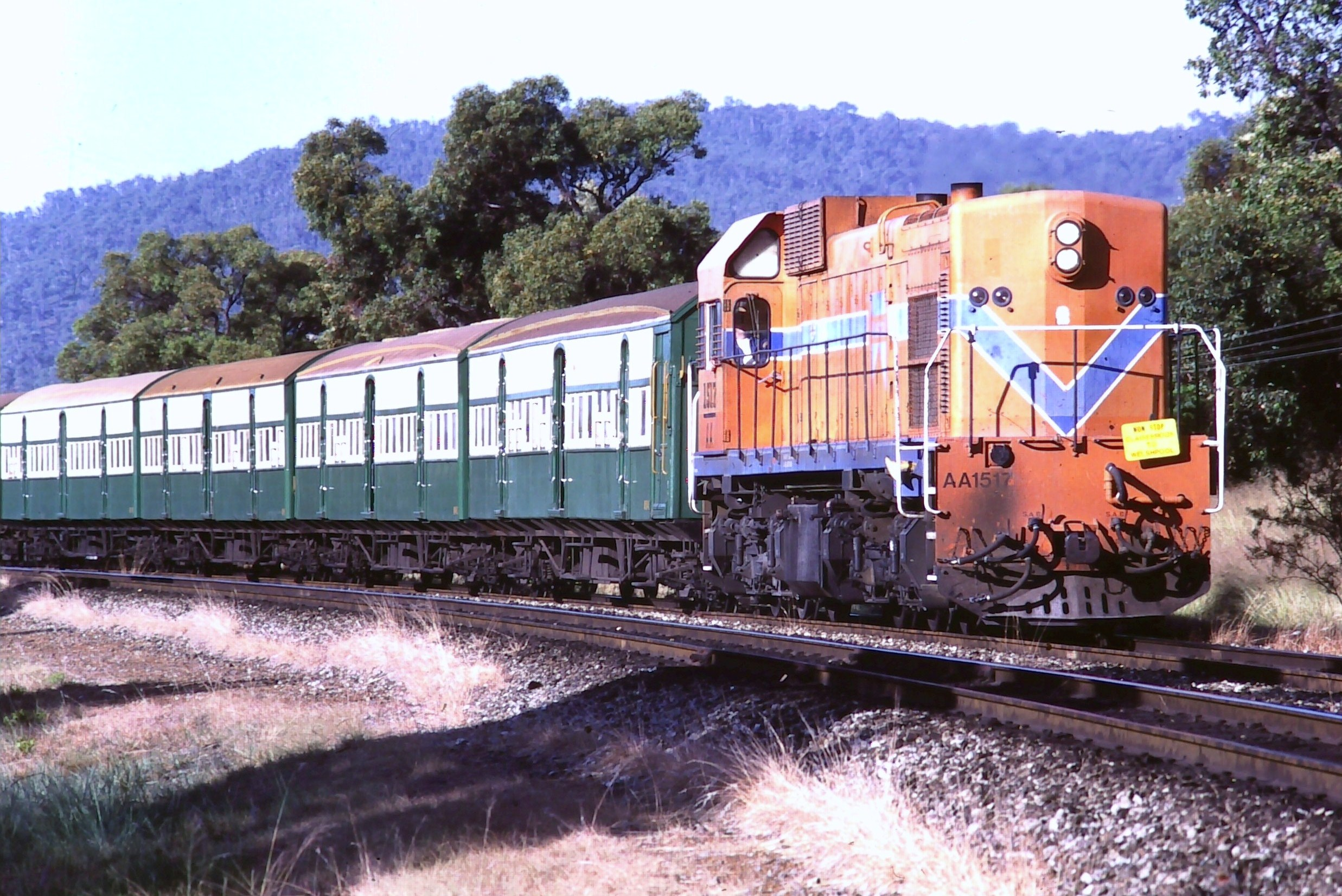
Westrail liveried AA1517 with carriages in WAGR larch green and cream livery near Kelmscott in December 1986

Until 1951, most steam locomotives were painted black. From that date, locomotives used on passenger services were painted green. The early diesel locomotives were painted green, with a red stripe later added. In the late 1960s, a grey and light blue livery was introduced. The latter was resurrected by South Spur Rail Services in the early 2000s.

Carriages were painted Indian red, before a larch green and cream livery was introduced in October 1951. When launched in 1964, The Midlander stock was painted in a maroon and ivory livery. When the Westrail brand was introduced in 1975, an orange and blue livery was introduced for locomotives. In the late 1990s, this was superseded by a yellow and blue livery.

== Rolling stock ==
The WAGR operated a large number of unique steam, diesel and electric locomotive classes. Most of the steam locomotives were built in the United Kingdom, with the WAGR's Midland Railway Workshops building some from 1915. The early diesels were mainly built by Beyer, Peacock and Company in England, Clyde Engineering in Sydney, and English Electric in Brisbane. Later diesels were assembled in Perth.

The WAGR built much of its carriage and wagon stock at the Midland Railway Workshops. From the late 1930s, the WAGR operated diesel railcars such as the Governor and Wildflower classes.

In 1936, the WAGR owned 420 locomotives, 4 railcars, 461 carriages, 24 brake vans and 11,052 goods wagons.

A survey of goods wagons carried out in 1949 disclosed that the WAGR had 54 classes of 4-wheeled vehicles and 13 different types of bogie wagons. The 4-wheeled vehicles had been built on 12 different types of underframes in no fewer than 71 variations, ranging in length from 3.4 to 6.4 metres (11 to 21 ft). The bogie wagons were mounted on six different types of bogie trucks and represented a total of 61 styles. The lack of uniformity caused difficulties in operation and maintenance, and made necessary a large and widely varying stock of spare parts of limited interchangeability.

In the early 1950s, the WAGR implemented a replacement program of goods wagons built instead to rigidly standard designs, on only three types of underframes, 5.5, 11.0 and 12.8 metres (18, 36 and 42 ft) in length, respectively. The new standard designs provided for increased axle loads and higher tare-load ratios, and the new wagons were also fitted with NCDA-type central drawbars and doubly articulating couplers.

In connection with the gauge conversion of the Eastern and Eastern Goldfields Railways in the late 1960s, the WAGR constructed a stock of standard gauge goods vehicles, including a class of wheat hopper wagons that, with a maximum payload of almost 77 tonnes (170,000 lb), were the largest freight vehicles operated by any Government railway in Australia.

== Chief Mechanical Engineer ==
Chief Mechanical Engineer was the highest posting at the Midland Railway Workshops, which in turn managed (through construction, repair and design) all aspects of railway maintenance and equipment. The post was established in 1900 and abandoned in 1989.

== Legacy and preservation ==
A number of former WAGR locomotives and rolling stock types, as well as many examples of WAGR architecture and railway infrastructure have been preserved, with the Hotham Valley Railway and Rail Heritage WA holding extensive collections. Some items are preserved interstate, notably by the Pichi Richi Railway. With the deregulation of the Australian rail market in the 1990s, former WAGR rolling stock has operated in other states, with L class locomotives having operated in the eastern states for ATN Access, Aurizon and Pacific National.

== Publications ==
In September 1970, WAGR News Letter was launched as a staff newsletter. The last edition was published in December 1973, with Movement superseding it.

From 1975 until 1981, Westrail News Letter was published as a staff newsletter.

== See also ==
- Rail transport in Western Australia
- Railway dams and reservoirs of Western Australia
- Transperth
- Transwa
- Wheatbelt railway lines of Western Australia

== Sources ==
- Affleck, Fred (1978). On Track: The Making of Westrail, 1950–1976. Perth: Westrail. ISBN 0724475605. OCLC 6489347.
- Higham, Geoffrey (2007). Marble Bar to Mandurah: A History of Passenger Rail Services in Western Australia (1st ed.). Bassendean: Rail Heritage WA. ISBN 978-0-9803922-0-3. OCLC 271545712. Wikidata Q140375689.

== Bibliography ==
- WAGR Publicity Section, Perth. Pamphlets and information sheets produced in the early 1960s.
