= Bunbury railway station =

Railway station in Western Australia

Bunbury Terminal
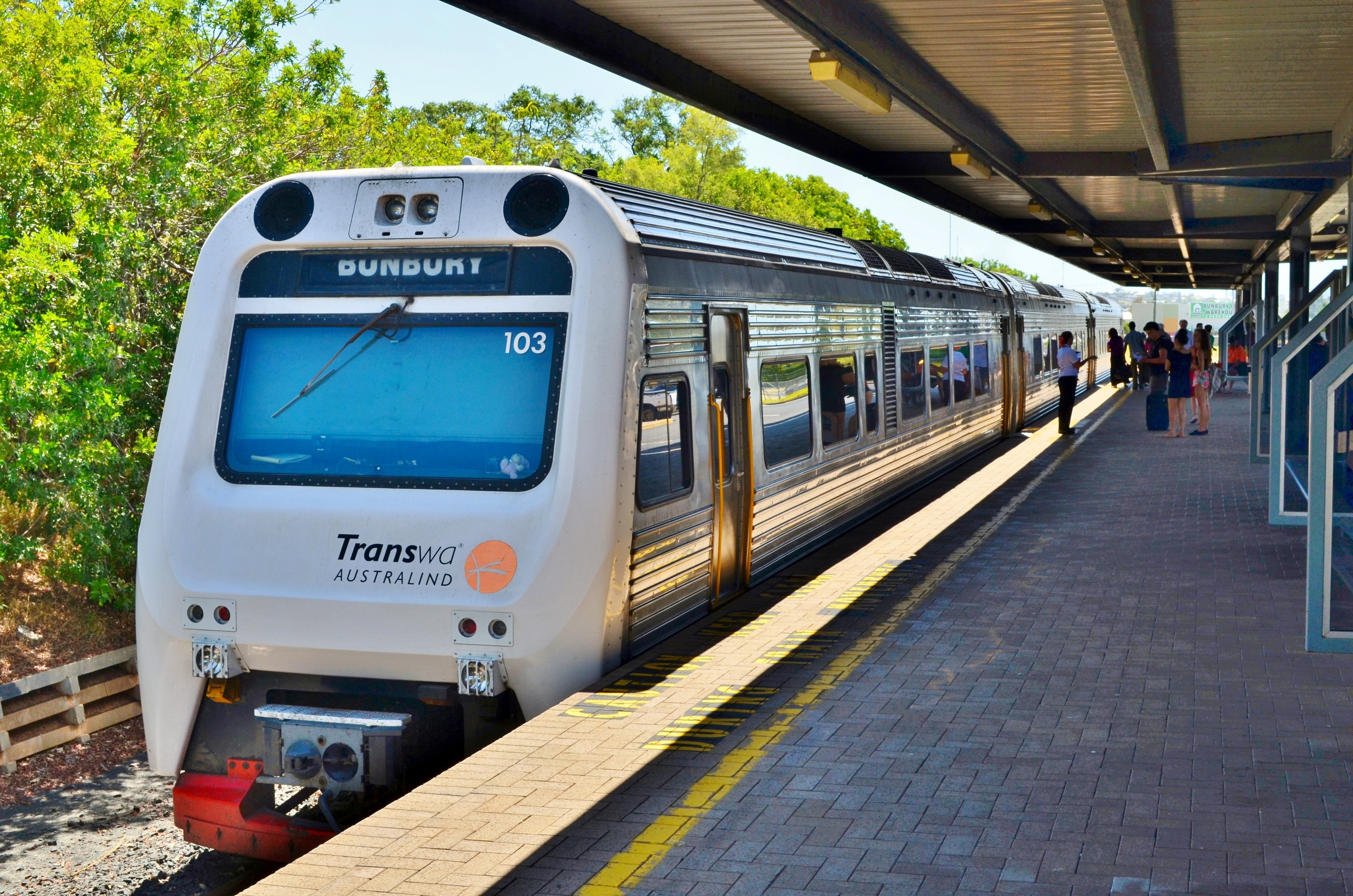
- The Australind at Bunbury station in January 2014

General information
- Location: Picton Road, East Bunbury; Western Australia
- Coordinates: 33°20′40″S 115°39′26″E
- Owner: Public Transport Authority
- Operator: Transwa
- Line: South Western

Construction
- Structure type: Ground

History
- Opened: 29 May 1985

Services
Preceding station	Transwa	Following station
Brunswick Junction towards Perth	Australind	Terminus
Location

Bunbury Terminal (also known as Bunbury Passenger Terminal) is a train and bus station for Transwa services. The terminal is located in East Bunbury, Western Australia.

It is the terminus station for the Australind train service to/from Perth along the South Western line. It was built as a replacement for the more centrally located station, being opened on 29 May 1985 by Minister for Transport Julian Grill.

Transwa coach services operate to Walpole, Augusta, Pemberton, Donnybrook, Collie, Boyup Brook and Bridgetown.

TransBunbury bus routes 826 and 827 connect Bunbury Terminal with the Bunbury city centre.

== Platform ==
Bunbury Passenger Terminal platform
Stop	Platform	Line	Stopping pattern	Destination	Notes
95022		Australind		Perth	
95023		Australind		Bunbury Passenger Terminal	Arrival stop number

== Bus routes ==
Transwa coach services

Stop	Route	Destination / description	Notes
Bunbury Passenger Terminal	SW1 Odds	to Pemberton via Busselton, Siesta Park Roadhouse, Margaret River, Augusta and Nannup	
Bunbury Passenger Terminal	SW2 Odds	to Pemberton via Donnybrook, Mullalyup, Bridgetown and Manjimup	
Bunbury Passenger Terminal	SW3 Odds	to Pemberton via Collie, Boyup Brook, Bridgetown and Manjimup	
Bunbury Passenger Terminal	SW1 Evens SW2 Evens SW3 Evens	to East Perth Terminal via Mandurah Station and Cockburn Central	

TransBunbury services

Stop	Route	Destination / description	Notes
Bunbury Passenger Terminal	826	to Bunbury Bus Station via Sandridge Road and Blair Street	
Bunbury Passenger Terminal	827	to Bunbury Bus Station via Bunbury Forum and Austral Parade	
Bunbury Passenger Terminal	827	to Glen Iris via Picton Road, Orchid Drive and Ince Road	
Picton Road (east bound)	826	to Bunbury Bus Station via Sandridge Road and Blair Street	
Picton Road (east bound)	827	to Bunbury Bus Station via Bunbury Forum and Austral Parade	
Picton Road (east bound)	827	to Glen Iris via Picton Road, Orchid Drive and Ince Road	
