= Old Bunbury railway station =

Former railway station in Bunbury, Western Australia

Coordinates: 33°19′27″S 115°38′19″E

Bunbury
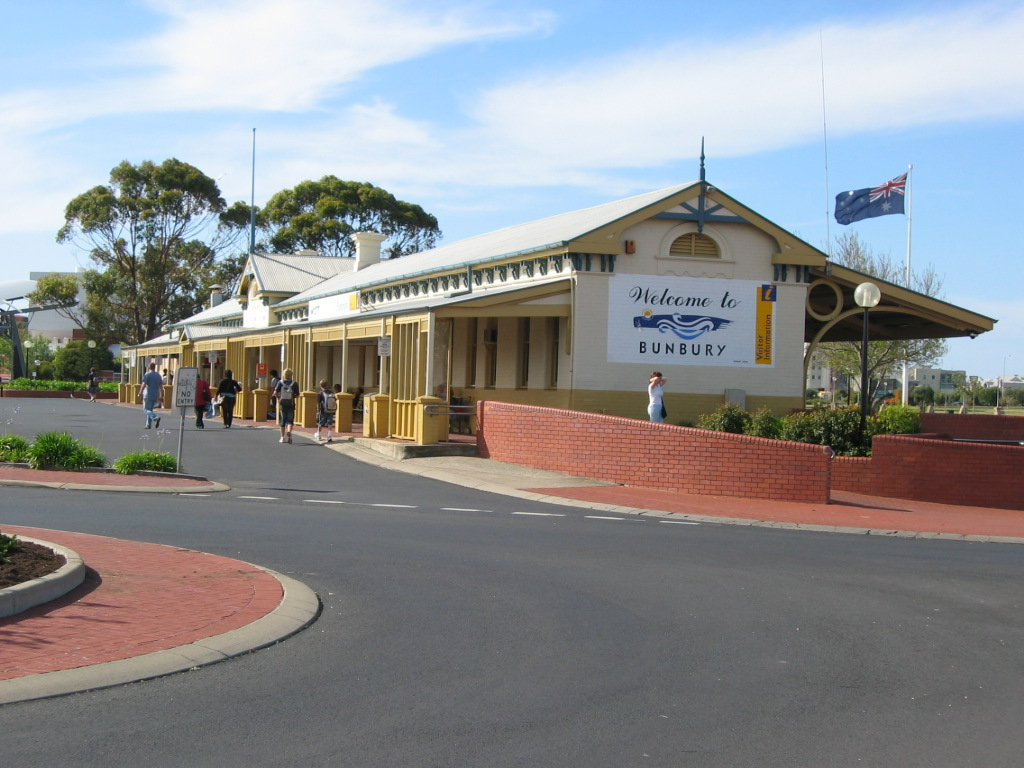
- Old Bunbury station in October 2006

General information
- Location: Carmody Place, Bunbury; Western Australia
- Owner: Western Australian Government Railways
- Operator: Westrail
- Line: South Western

Construction
- Structure type: Ground

History
- Opened: 14 November 1894
- Closed: 28 May 1985
- Rebuilt: 1905, 1928

Western Australia Heritage Register
- Type: State Registered Place
- Designated: 7 February 1997
- Reference no.: 331
Location

The former Bunbury railway station was the main railway station for Bunbury, Western Australia from 1894 until 1996. It was the terminus for the Australind passenger railway service from Perth. It was replaced in May 1985 by the current Bunbury Terminal in East Bunbury.

== History ==
The original structure was constructed in the 1880s; the railway was not connected to Perth at that stage. On 14 November 1894, the first station opened as the terminus for the South Western Railway.

A fire in December 1904 destroyed the original wooden station building with a brick replacement opened in 1905. In 1928, the station was rebuilt again.

== Bus terminal ==
Bunbury station was the terminus for bus services from regional locations in the south and south west of Western Australia, to connect with the rail service to Perth. As regional railway passenger services declined, and branch lines were closed, railway bus services were put in place to replace the loss of rail access. The former branch lines to Flinders Bay, Nannup, Manjimup and Pemberton were served by WAGR road buses.

== Relocation of railway ==
The last train to use the station departed on 28 May 1985 with a new station opening at East Bunbury, 4 kilometres (2.5 mi) to the south-east the following day, along with the railway marshalling yard and other railway facilities. In the early 1990s the re-location was reviewed and confirmed.

== Current use ==
Bunbury Bus Station

General information
- Location: Carmody Place; Bunbury, Western Australia; Australia
- System: Regional Town bus station
- Bus routes: 11
- Bus stands: 8, 7 in use
- Bus operators: Public Transport Authority / TransBunbury

Other information
- Fare zone: 1
Location

The station building is still used as a bus station which serves as the main terminus for TransBunbury bus services to surrounding suburbs, as well as being the Bunbury Visitor Centre.

=== Bus Routes ===
The following public bus routes service the bus station:

Route	Destination	Via	Ref.
[72029] Stand 1
825	Dolphin Discovery Centre	Koombana Drive	
826 ‡	Bunbury Passenger Terminal	Blair Street and Sandridge Road	
830	College Grove	Holywell Street, Timperley Road, Bunbury Health Campus and Somerville Drive	
[72030] Stand 2
828	Bunbury Health Campus	Yorla Road and Armanta Drive	
829	Bunbury Health Campus	Frankel Street and Hamersley Drive	
[72031] Stand 3
827 ‡	Glen Iris	Herbert Road, Austral Parade, Bunbury Forum, Bunbury Passenger Terminal, Orchid Drive and Ince Road	
845	Australind (Kingston Drive)	Blair Street, Australind Bypass, Eaton Fair Shopping Centre, Eaton Drive, The Boulevard, Treendale and Leisure Drive	
[72032] Stand 4
844	Eaton/Millbridge (Millbridge Boulevard)	Blair Street, Hale Street, Eaton Fair Shopping Centre, Lusitano Avenue and Millbridge Boulevard	
[72033] Stand 5
841	Australind (Travers Drive)	Blair Street, Clifton Park, Old Coast Road and Garfield Drive	
[72034] Stand 6
843	Dalyellup	Minninup Road, Minninup Forum, Hornibrook Road and Gutmann Parkway	
[72035] Stand 7
832	Bunbury Health Campus	Mangles Street, Ocean Drive, Minninup Forum, Withers and Usher	
[72036] Stand 8

- ‡ This service is free for passengers connecting to or from the Transwa Australind rail service.

== See also ==
- Albany railway station, Western Australia
