= Perth railway station =

Railway station in Perth, Western Australia

Perth
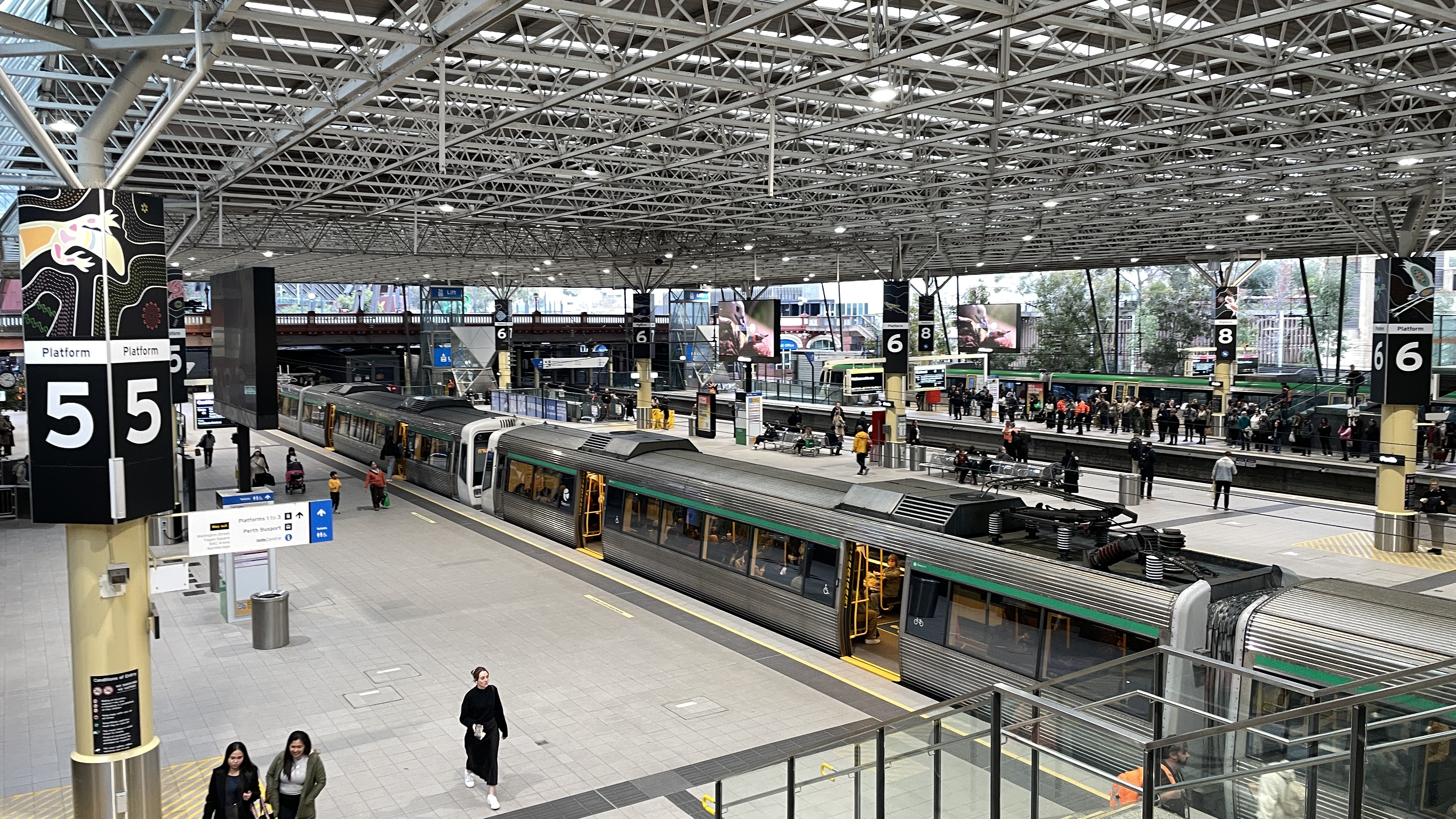
- Platforms 5 to 9

General information
- Location: Wellington Street, Roe Street; Perth, Western Australia; Australia
- Coordinates: 31°57′05″S 115°51′37″E
- Owner: Public Transport Authority
- Operator: Transperth Train Operations
- Lines: Airport line; Armadale line; Ellenbrook line; Fremantle line; Mandurah line; Midland line; Thornlie–Cockburn line; Yanchep line; Australind
- Platforms: 9 (3 side above ground, 2 islands above ground, 1 island below ground)
- Tracks: 9
- Bus routes: 20
- Connections: Bus transfer at Perth Busport, Wellington Street, and William Street Mandurah and Yanchep services at Perth Underground

Construction
- Structure type: At-grade & underground
- Platform levels: 2
- Parking: No
- Cycle facilities: Yes
- Accessible: Yes
- Architectural style: Neoclassical

Other information
- Status: Staffed
- Station code: MPH
- Fare zone: 1 /

History
- Opened: 1 March 1881

Passengers
- 2017: 38,159 daily

Services
Preceding station	Transperth	Following station
Terminus	Armadale line	McIver towards Byford
Terminus	Thornlie–Cockburn line	McIver towards Cockburn Central
through to Fremantle line	Midland line	McIver towards Midland
City West towards Fremantle	Fremantle line	through to Midland line
City West towards Claremont	Airport line	McIver towards High Wycombe
Terminus	Ellenbrook line	McIver towards Ellenbrook
Preceding station	Transwa	Following station
Terminus	Australind	Armadale towards Bunbury
Special event services
Preceding station	Transperth	Following station
Terminus	Armadale line PE	Perth Stadium Terminus
Showgrounds Terminus	Fremantle line SE	Terminus

Western Australia Heritage Register
- Official name: Perth Railway Precinct
- Type: State Registered Place
- Designated: 28 August 2001
- Reference no.: 2133
Location
- Location of Perth railway station

Perth railway station is the largest station on the Transperth network, serving the central business district of Perth, Western Australia. It serves as an interchange between the Airport, Armadale, Ellenbrook, Fremantle, Midland, and Thornlie–Cockburn lines as well as Transwa's Australind service. It is also directly connected to Perth Underground railway station, which has the Yanchep and Mandurah lines.

== History ==
=== Establishment ===
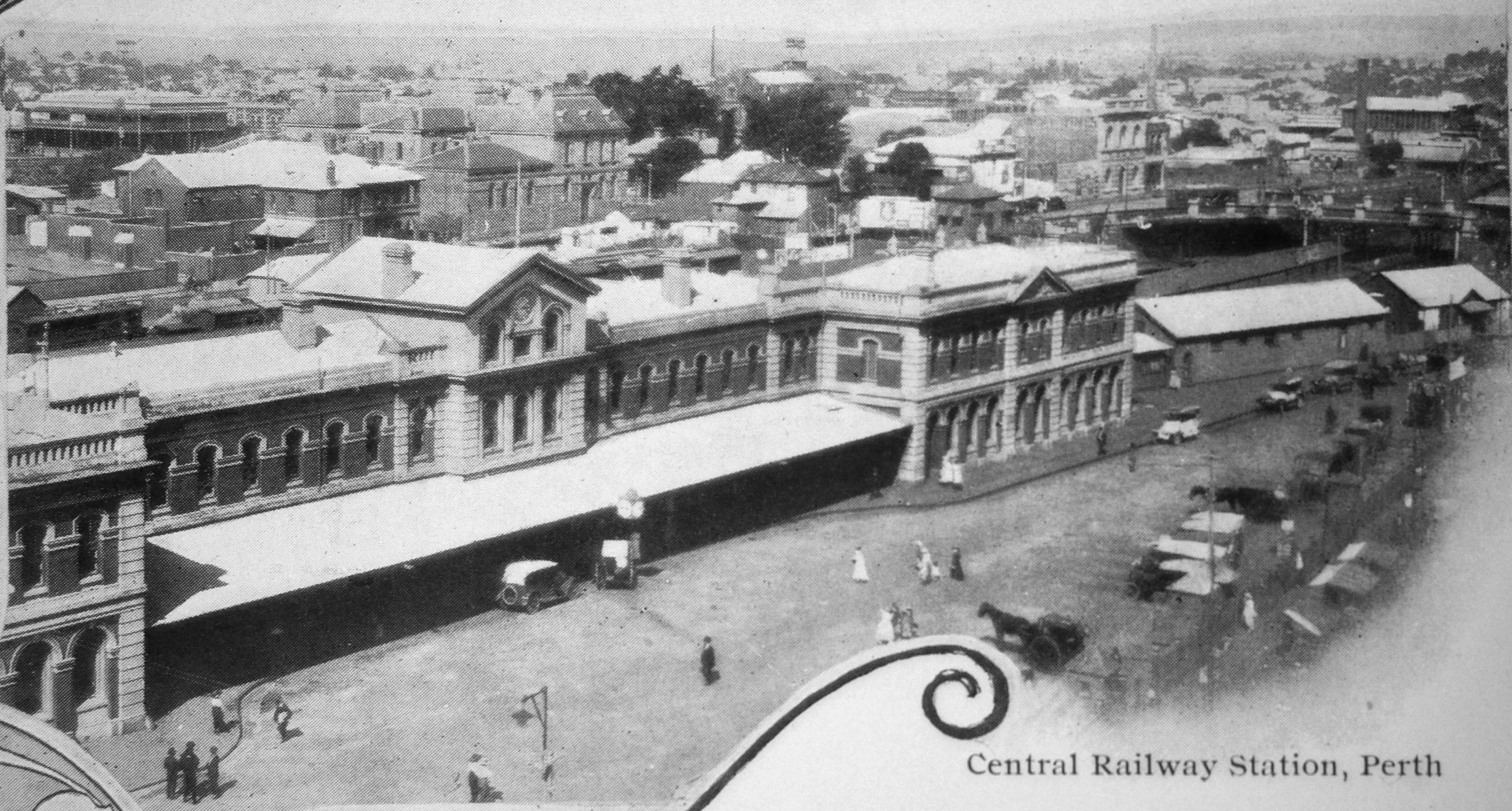
The station in 1921

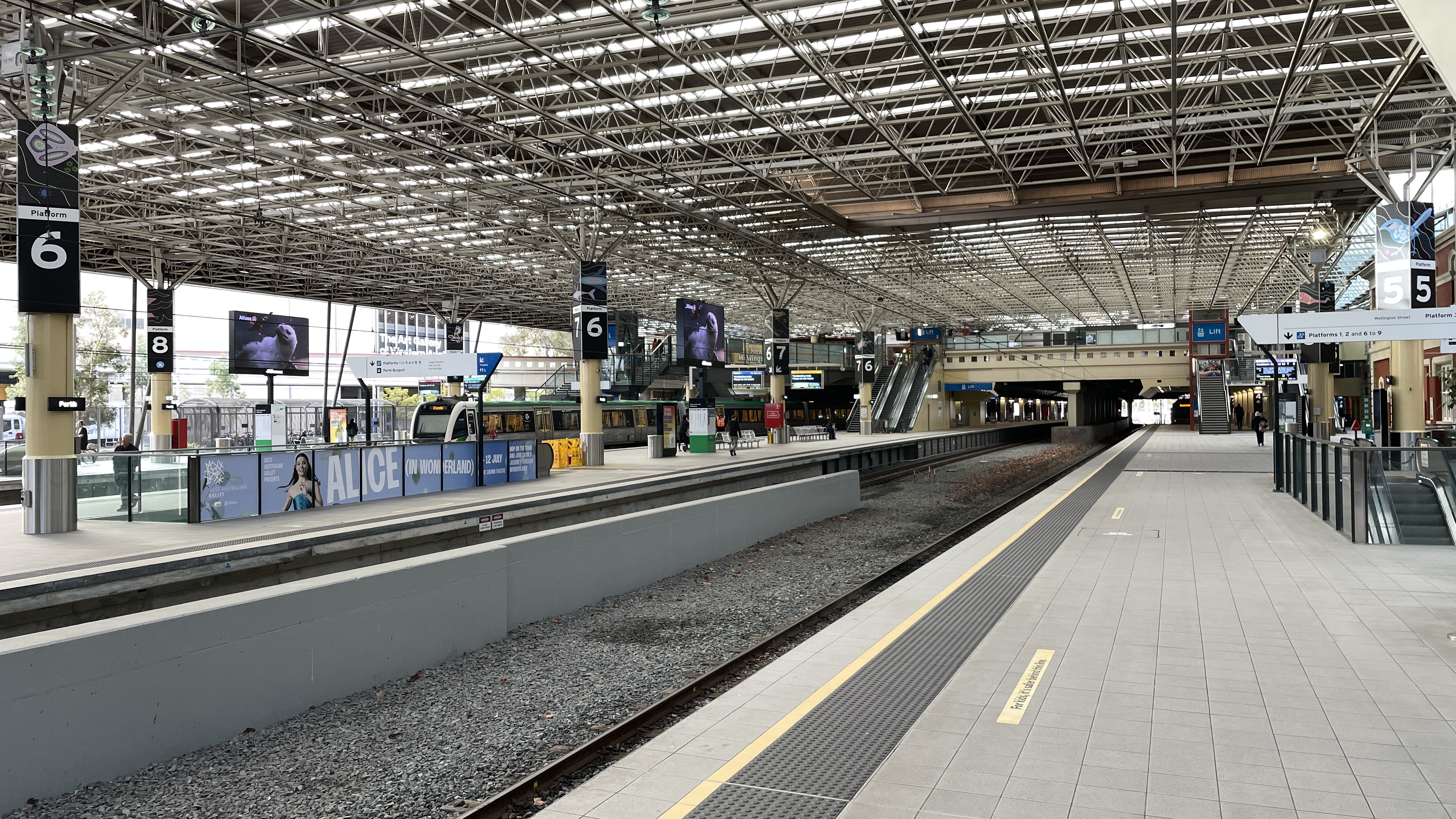
Looking south-east on Platform 5

The foundation stone for the original Richard Roach Jewell-designed Perth station was laid on 10 May 1880, with the station opening on 1 March 1881 as part of the Eastern Railway from Fremantle to Guildford. The station had one through platform with a terminating dock platform at the east end; however it soon proved to be inadequate for the growing railway, and after the opening of the Armadale line in 1889 put further stress on the facility it was decided that a larger station would be built.

The new, larger Victorian Free Classical style station building, designed by George Temple-Poole, was opened south of the original station in 1894, with the old building demolished and replaced by a new island platform. The new station building, still in use today, has been expanded numerous times since being built, including the addition of two wings at the east and west ends of the building. A planned third storey and clocktower were never built. A collection of freight and administrative offices and tearooms were also part of the railway station complex. The station initially had the Barrack Street and William Street bridges as limiting factors to its further development, though platforms to the west of the station that ran underneath the Horseshoe Bridge were eventually constructed.

The station was the centre of the Western Australian Government Railways system, with most regional trains originating from the station, and it also served as the headquarters of the agency until 1976. Following the cessation of most regional passenger services, the completion of standard gauge tracks to East Perth station, and the relocation of most administrative offices to the Westrail Centre, by the late 1970s Perth station remained only as a terminus for The Australind service to Bunbury, as well as an interchange for Transperth's suburban services.

The railway building has at times housed various commercial operations as well as police offices. The WA Craft Council was a tenant in the 1980s. For a considerable length of time the forecourt area was used for car parking, though this is no longer the case.

=== Later development ===
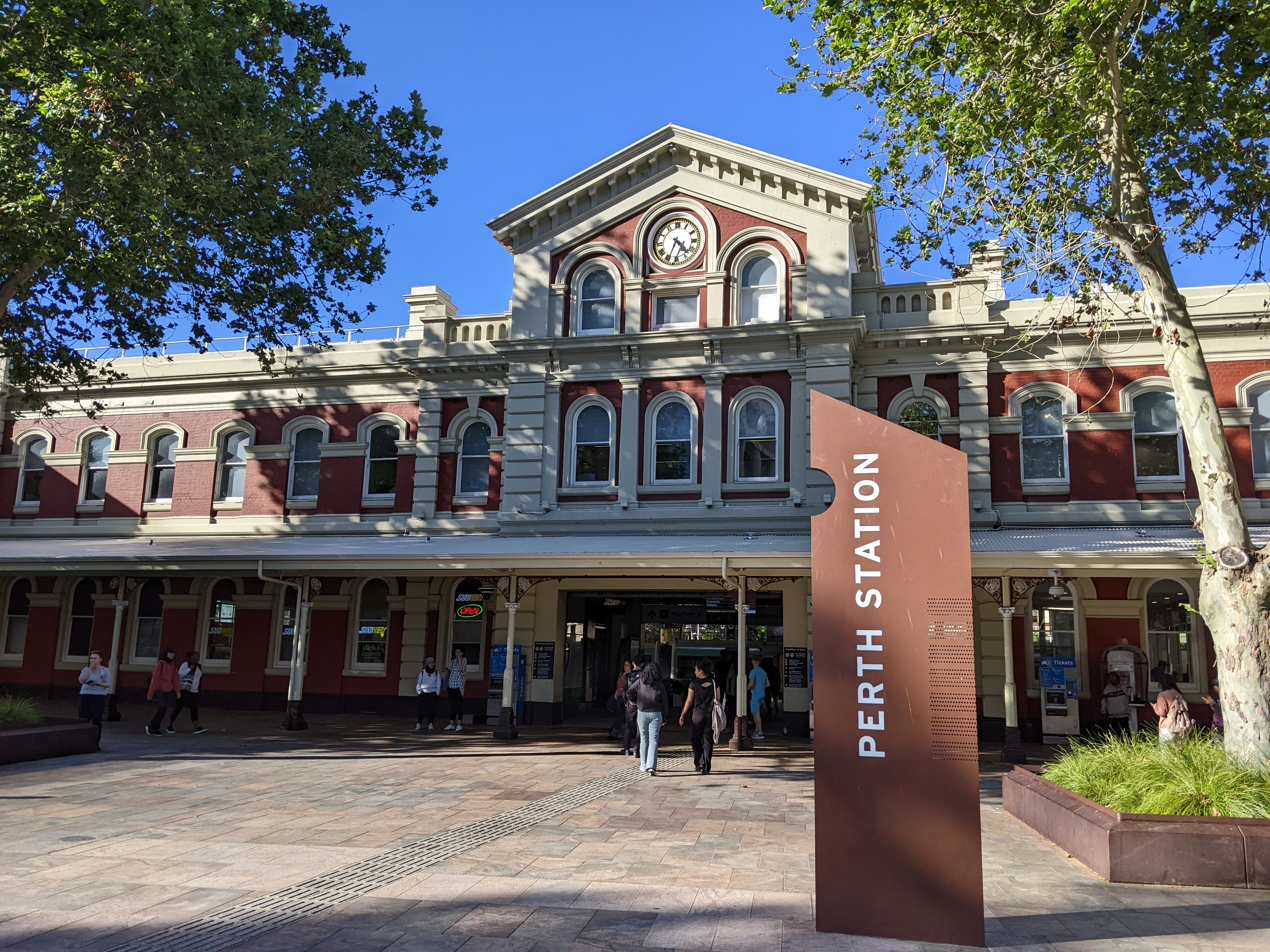
Wellington Street entrance in 2024

As early as the 1950s, there were moves and suggestions for the redevelopment of the station area. Starting in 1988 the station underwent a major upgrade as part of the Northern Suburbs Transit System project, which included the construction of a new island platform, a steel and glass roof that covered the central platforms, an adjoining multi-storey car park, and the Citiplace Centre retail and community services hub built on a level above the existing station platforms which also connected pedestrian footbridges linking the Perth Cultural Centre and the Forrest Chase shopping complex to the station.

In 1992, a ninth platform was added along with a pedestrian overpass at the extreme west end of the station which allowed direct access to the railway station from Wellington Street bus station and Northbridge. With the introduction of the SmartRider contactless electronic ticketing system and installation of fare gates, Perth railway station became a closed station in early 2007; as a result the entrance on the Horseshoe Bridge was fenced off and its wooden stairway and overpass was later removed.

As part of the New MetroRail project, the station was refurbished and expanded with new underground platforms built at a 90-degree angle to the existing platforms beneath Gordon Stephenson House to the east of William Street, between Wellington and Murray Streets. The underground platforms, numbered 1 and 2, are known as Perth Underground, but are in some aspects considered part of the overall Perth station. The underground platforms are linked to the original Perth station via a walkway under Wellington Street; a new entrance to Perth Underground was also constructed at the west end of the Murray Street pedestrian mall. The new platforms opened on 15 October 2007.

Further changes to the station occurred as part of the Perth City Link project in the early-2010s, which saw the above ground rail lines west of the Horseshoe Bridge sunk and the existing platforms and overpass there demolished to make way for a new public space, Yagan Square. This reduced the above ground platforms from nine to seven. The station also saw the construction of a new pedestrian underpass connecting the three main above ground platforms, and upgrades and extensions to the roof.

In September 2013, a new Platform 9 on the Roe Street side of the station opened. This new platform was temporarily used for special event services until mid-December 2013, before becoming part of the Midland line.

In 2022 and 2023, the forecourt of the station underwent refurbishment in order to improve amenity and visitor safety.

== Plaques formerly in entrance area to station ==
The railway station entrance area had plaques to commemorate the following events:

- 1 March 1981 – centenary of Fremantle to Guildford railway
- 14 November 1989 – Perth to Joondalup railway first spike driven
- 28 September 1991 – introduction of electric trains
- 11 April 1992 – commissioning of electric train services
- 25 March 1994 – centenary of railway station

== Platforms and services ==
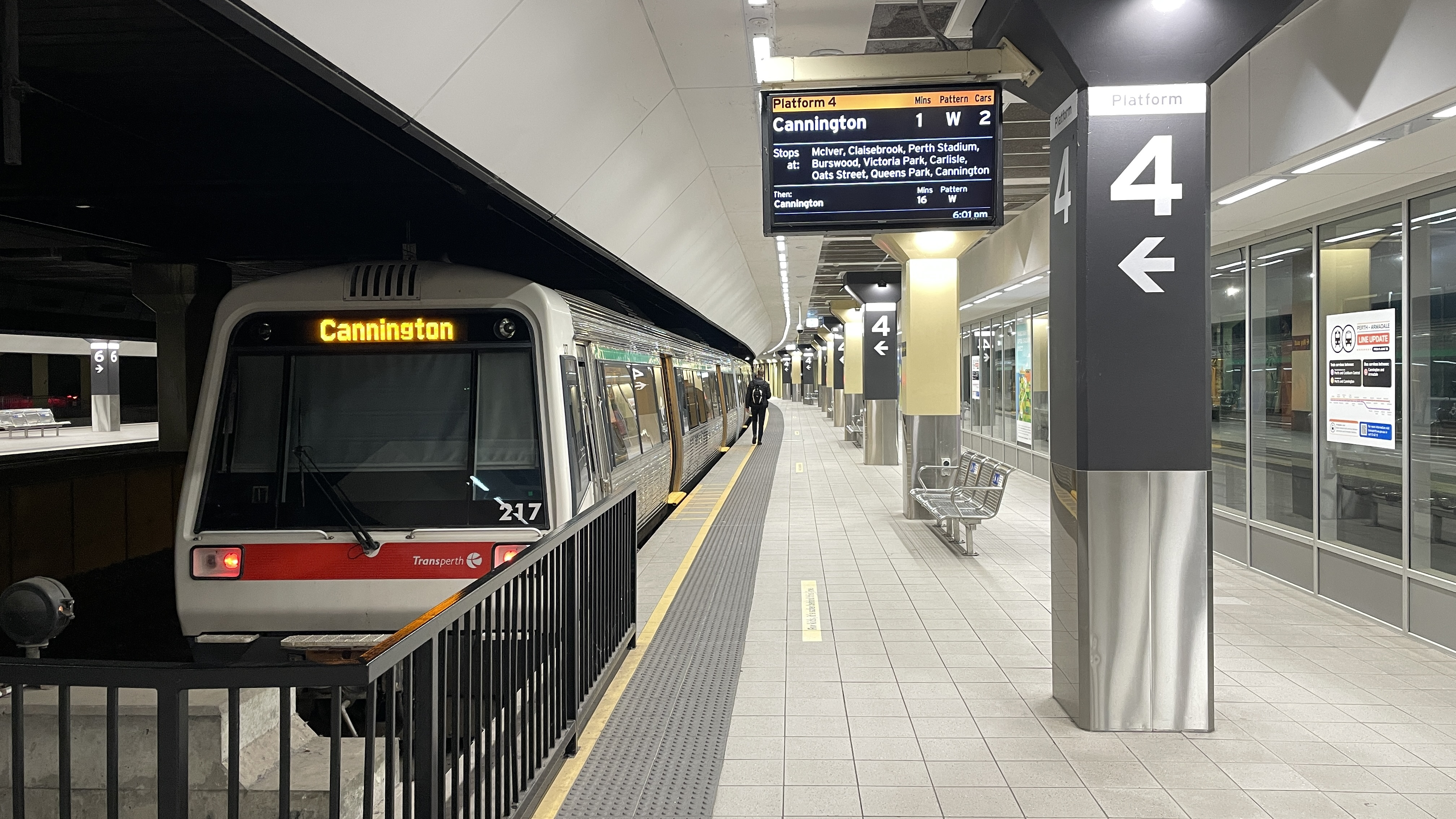
Platform 4

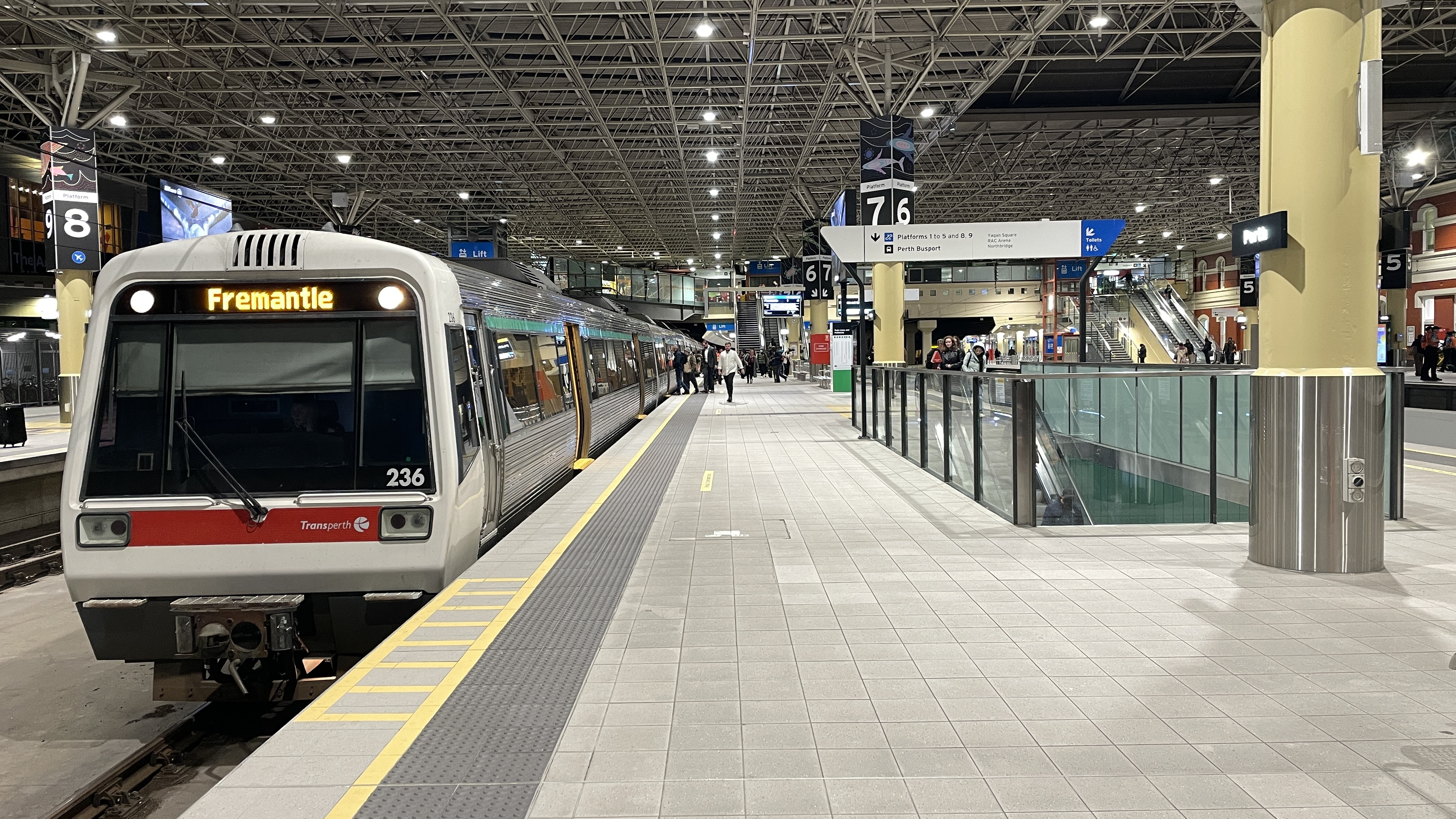
Platform 7

Platforms currently in use are as follows:

Perth

Perth platform arrangement
Platform	Line	Destination	Via	Service Pattern	Notes	Source
3	Australind	Bunbury	Armadale	Limited express services		
4	Armadale line	Byford	Cannington	All stations		
5	Thornlie-Cockburn line	Cockburn Central	Thornlie	All stations		
6	Armadale line Thornlie-Cockburn line	Byford, Cockburn Central	Cannington or Thornlie	All stations	Select peak hour services on weekdays depart this platform.	
7	Fremantle line	Fremantle	City West	All stations		
7	Airport line	Claremont	City West	All stations		
8	Midland line	Midland	Bayswater	All stations		
8	Airport line	High Wycombe	Bayswater	All stations		
8	Ellenbrook line	Ellenbrook	Bayswater	All stations		
9	Ellenbrook line	Ellenbrook	Bayswater	All stations	Late night services.	

=== Transport links ===
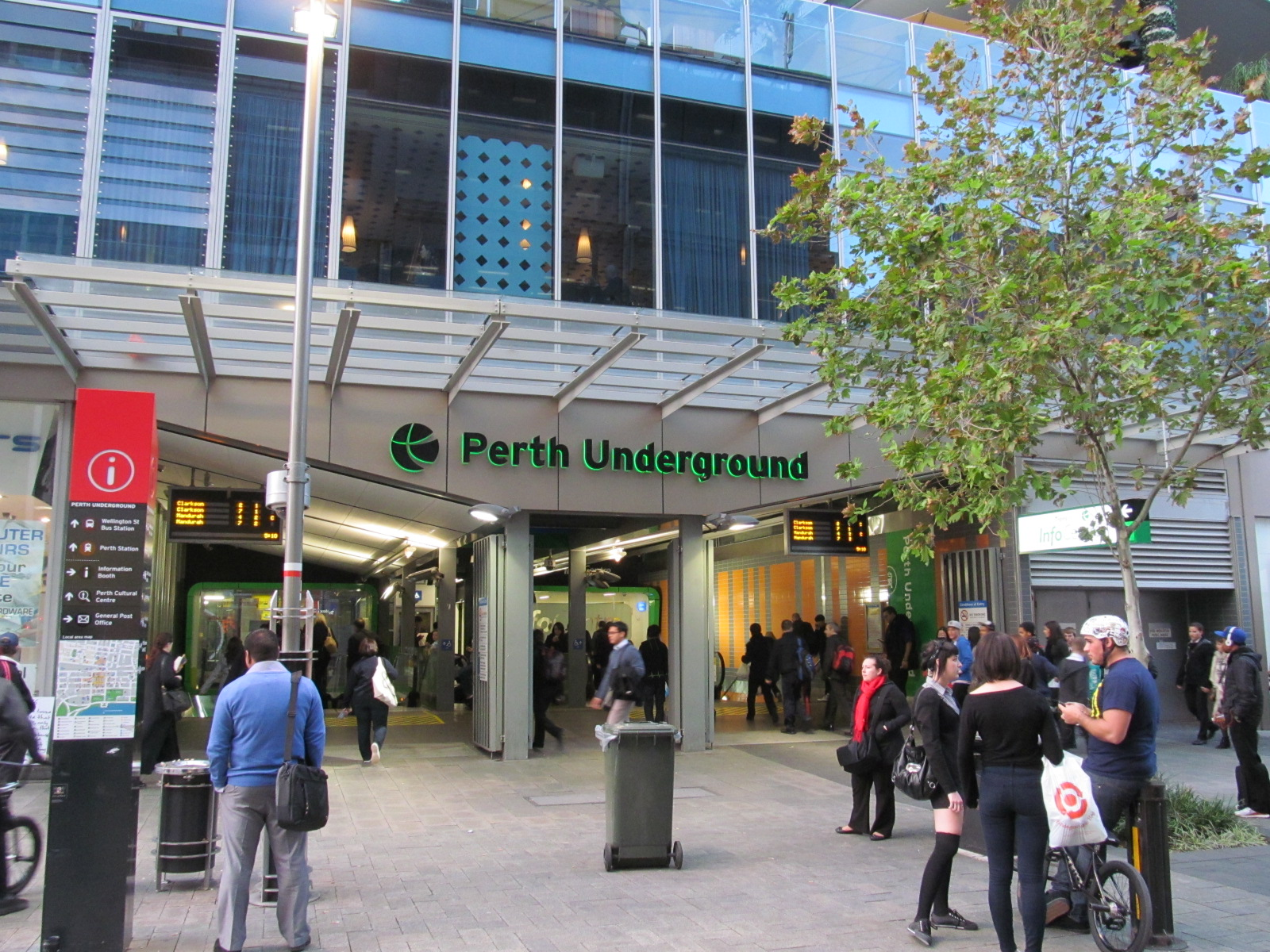
Perth Underground Murray Street entrance

Several Transperth bus routes stop adjacent to Perth station. Buses also operate from the nearby Perth Busport, and rail replacement services also depart from the nearby Perth Busport. As of August 2023, Wellington Street has been upgraded to include eleven bus stands outside the station, seven eastbound and four westbound.

Stop	Route	Destination / description	Notes
Beaufort Street/CAT ID 4	1 Blue CAT	to Perth Busport via Northbridge	
Stand 1	67, 68	to Mirrabooka bus station	
Stand 2	51	To Cannington Station via Orrong Rd	
Stand 2	901	Rail Replacement to Midland Station	In use when Midland Line is out of action
Stand 3	960	to Curtin University bus station	High Frequency
Stand 3	902	Rail Replacement to High Wycombe Station	In use when Airport Line is out of action
Stand 4	38	to Cloverdale via Carlisle Station	
Stand 4	220	to Armadale Station	
Stand 4	903	Rail Replacement to Ellenbrook Station	In use when Ellenbrook Line is out of action
Stand 4	908	Rail Replacement to Cockburn Central Station	In use when Thornlie-Cockburn Line is out of action
Stand 5/CAT ID 67	2 Red CAT	to WACA	Extends to Matagarup Bridge on event days
Stand 5/CAT ID 67	3 Yellow CAT	to Claisebrook Station	
Stand 6	40, 980	to Galleria Bus Station	40 via Bayswater Station. 980 High Frequency via William St & Walter Rd
Stand 6	41	to Bayswater Station	
Stand 6	42, 43	to Maylands Boat Ramp	
Stand 6	950, 950X	to Morley Station	High Frequency, Limited Stops (Routes with an X suffix)
Stand 7	Layover/Overflow for Stand 6, TransWA Road Coach Services		
Stand 8/ CAT ID 145	2 Red CAT	to West Perth	
Stand 9/ CAT ID 58	3 Yellow CAT	to West Perth	
Stand 10	40, 41, 42, 43, 980	to Elizabeth Quay Bus Station	
Stand 10	950, 950X	to QEII Medical Centre	High Frequency, Limited Stops
Stand 11	38, 51, 67, 68, 220	to Perth Busport	
Stand 11	960	to Mirrabooka Bus Station	High Frequency
Stand 11	901, 902, 903, 908	Rail Replacement to Perth Busport	Weekday services terminate at this stand. Weekend services continue to Perth Busport

== Sources ==
- Higham, Geoffrey (2007). Marble Bar to Mandurah: A History of Passenger Rail Services in Western Australia (1st ed.). Bassendean: Rail Heritage WA. ISBN 978-0-9803922-0-3. OCLC 271545712. Wikidata Q140375689.
