= Success, Western Australia =

Success
- Suburb
- Interactive map of Success
- Coordinates: 32.152°S 115.845°E
- Country: Australia
- State: Western Australia
- City: Perth
- LGA: City of Cockburn

Government
  - State electorate: Cockburn
  - Federal division: Fremantle

Area
  - Total: 6.1 km^{2} (2.4 sq mi)

Population
  - Total: 11,340 (SAL 2021)
- Postcode: 6164
Suburbs around Success
| Yangebup | Cockburn Central | Jandakot |
| Beeliar | Success | Atwell |
| Wattleup | Hammond Park | Aubin Grove |

Success is a southern suburb of Perth, the capital city of Western Australia, located within the City of Cockburn.

The name Success comes from Captain James Stirling's ship HMS Success.

Urban development of Success didn't begin until the early 1990s when the Kwinana Freeway was extended to Forrest Road (now Armadale Road and Beeliar Drive). The population grew from 4,854 in the 2006 census to 11,340 in the 2021 census.

== Amenities and facilities ==
Success is home to Cockburn Gateway shopping centre, which features 170 stores, with Aldi, Big W, Coles, Kmart and Woolworths, the anchor tenants. It is owned by the GPT Group and Perron Group.

Aubin Grove railway station is located at the southeastern end of Success and services the southern end of the suburb. The northern end is serviced by Cockburn Central railway station just outside its northeastern boundary. Both are on the Mandurah railway line.

== Transport ==
=== Bus ===
- 233 Cockburn Central station to Gosnells station – serves Cockburn Gateway
- 514 Cockburn Central station to Murdoch station – serves Beeliar Drive
- 518 Cockburn Central station to Murdoch TAFE – serves Cockburn Gatewa
- 523 Cockburn Central station to Treeby – serves Cockburn Gateway
- 525 Cockburn Central station to Aubin Grove station – serves Cockburn Gateway, Alabaster Drive, Baningan Avenue, Hammond Road and Russell Road
- 526 Cockburn Central station to Aubin Grove station – serves Cockburn Gateway and Wentworth Parade
- 527 Cockburn Central station to Aubin Grove station – serves Cockburn Gateway
- 530, 531 and 532 Cockburn Central station to Fremantle station – serve Cockburn Gateway and Beeliar Drive
- 535 Aubin Grove station to Hammond Park West – only serves Aubin Grove station
- 536 Aubin Grove station to Hammond Park Secondary College – only serves Aubin Grove station
- 537 Aubin Grove station to Wandi – only serves Aubin Grove station

=== Rail ===
- Mandurah Line
  - Aubin Grove Station
