= Aubin Grove railway station =

Railway station in Western Australia

Aubin Grove
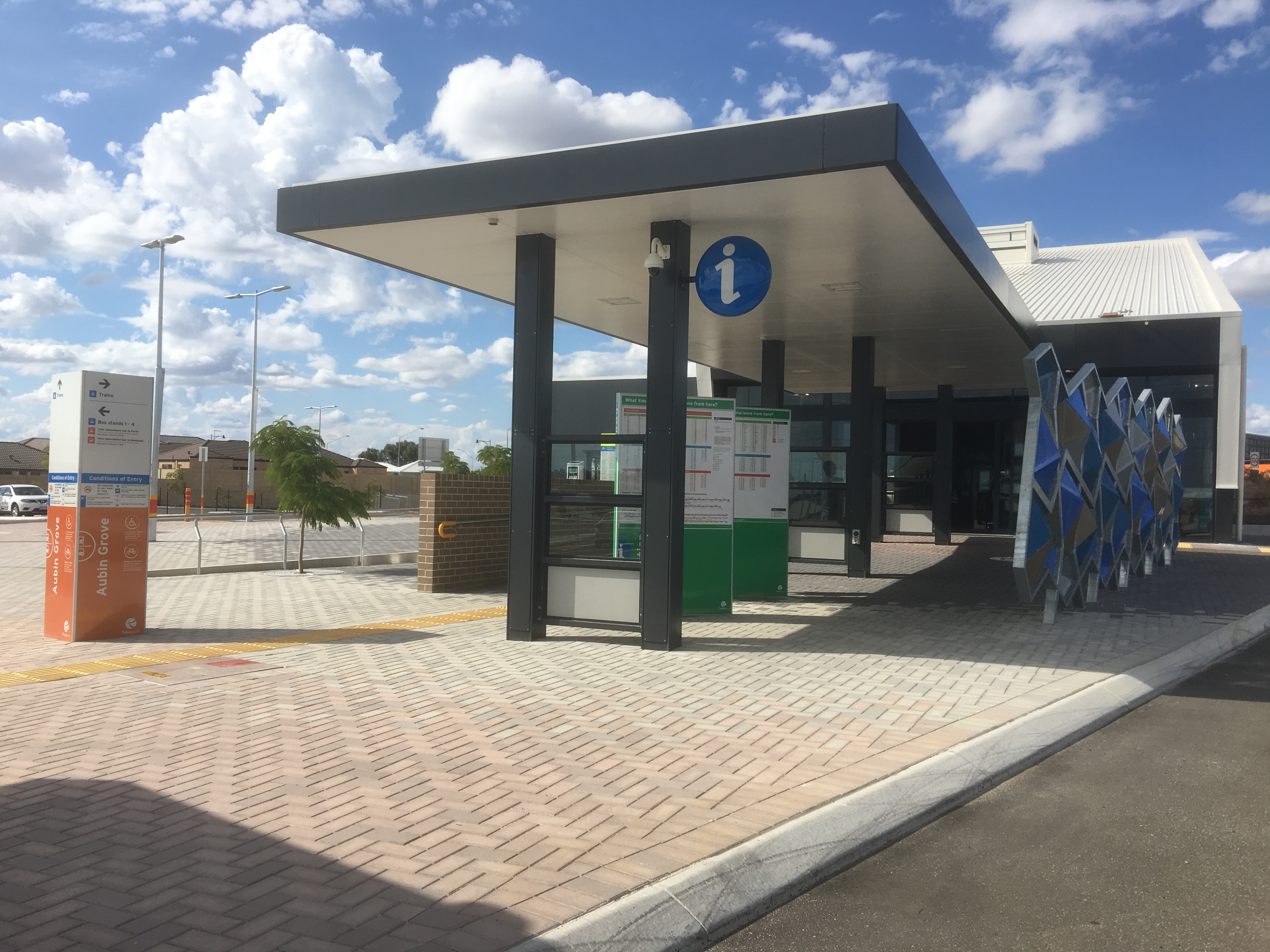
- Aubin Grove bus station entrance in April 2017

General information
- Location: Kwinana Freeway; Success and Atwell; Western Australia; Australia
- Coordinates: 32°09′18″S 115°51′28″E
- Owner: Public Transport Authority
- Operator: Public Transport Authority
- Line: Mandurah line
- Distance: 23.8 kilometres (14.8 mi) from Perth
- Platforms: 1 island platform with 2 platform edges
- Tracks: 2
- Bus routes: 7
- Bus stands: 4

Construction
- Parking: 1,948 bays
- Cycle facilities: 88 bays
- Accessible: Yes

Other information
- Fare zone: 3

History
- Opened: 23 April 2017

Services
Preceding station	Transperth	Following station
Cockburn Central towards Perth Underground	Mandurah line	Kwinana towards Mandurah
Events
Cockburn Central towards Perth Stadium	Mandurah line Stadium special	Kwinana towards Rockingham or Mandurah
Location
- Location of Aubin Grove station

Aubin Grove railway station is a suburban railway station serving Atwell, Aubin Grove, Hammond Park and Success, which are suburbs of Perth, Western Australia. It is on the Mandurah line, which is part of the Transperth network, and is located immediately north of Russell Road in the median of the Kwinana Freeway. It has two platform faces on a singular island platform, which is linked to either side of the freeway by a pedestrian overpass. Services run every 10 minutes during peak and every 15 minutes between peak. The journey to Perth station is 23.8 kilometres (14.8 mi) and takes 21 minutes. The station has a bus interchange with four bus stands and seven regular bus routes.

Construction of the station was promised by both major political parties ahead of the 2013 Western Australian state election. A tender was released for the station's construction in July 2014, with a projected cost of A$80 million for the whole project, including the purchase of two Transperth B-series trains. The design contract was awarded in February 2015 to a joint venture between Coniglio Ainsworth Architects and M. P. S. Architects. The scope of the project was broadened in April 2015 to include the widening of the Russell Road bridge over the freeway, which increased the project budget to $105 million. Construction on the station began in March 2016, and it was opened on 23 April 2017, with the final cost being $125 million.

== Description ==
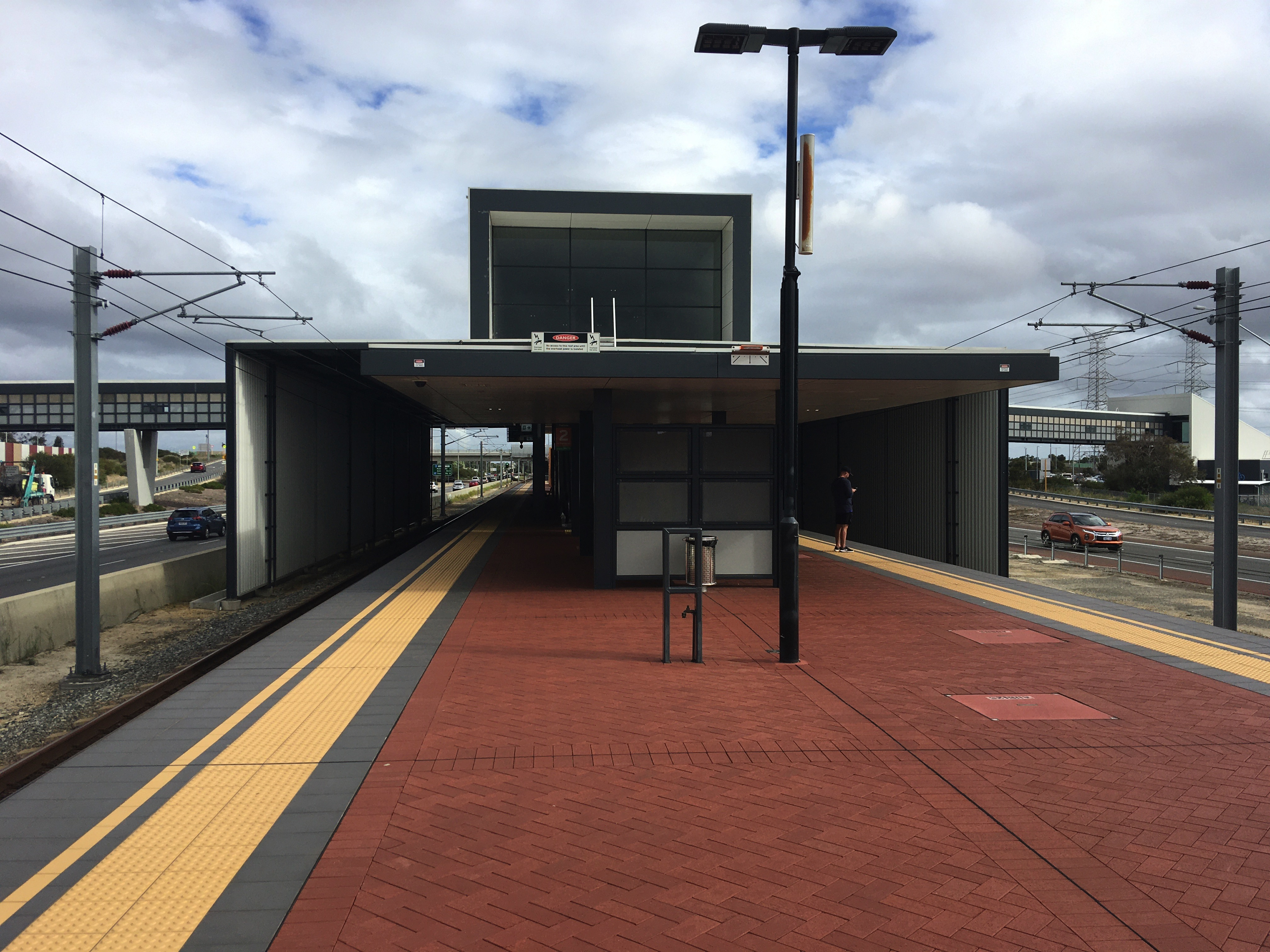
Aubin Grove station platform

Aubin Grove station is located in the median strip of the Kwinana Freeway, just north of Russell Road. The station is on the border of Atwell and Success, which are suburbs of Perth, Western Australia. It is also near Aubin Grove and Hammond Park, which are just south of Russell Road/Gibbs Road. It is on the Mandurah line, 23.8 kilometres (14.8 mi), or a 21-minute train journey, from Perth station. The adjacent stations are Cockburn station towards Perth and Kwinana station towards Mandurah. The station is within fare zone three.

Aubin Grove station consists of two platform faces on a singular island platform. The platform is 10 metres (33 ft) wide and 150 metres (490 ft) long, or long enough for a Transperth six car train – the longest trains used on the network. The platforms are linked to both sides of the freeway by a pedestrian bridge. The pedestrian bridge is accessed from the platforms by a set of escalators, a lift, and stairs. The station is fully accessible. In the western entrance are public toilets. Next to that entrance is the station's bus interchange, which has four bus stands, as well as the station's main car park. There is a smaller car park next to the eastern entrance. In total, the station has 1,948 regular parking bays, 6 short term parking bays, and 19 motorcycle bays, making it the second largest station car park in Perth. The western car park was built to be so large in part due to high voltage transmission lines making the land unable to be used for much else.

=== Public art ===
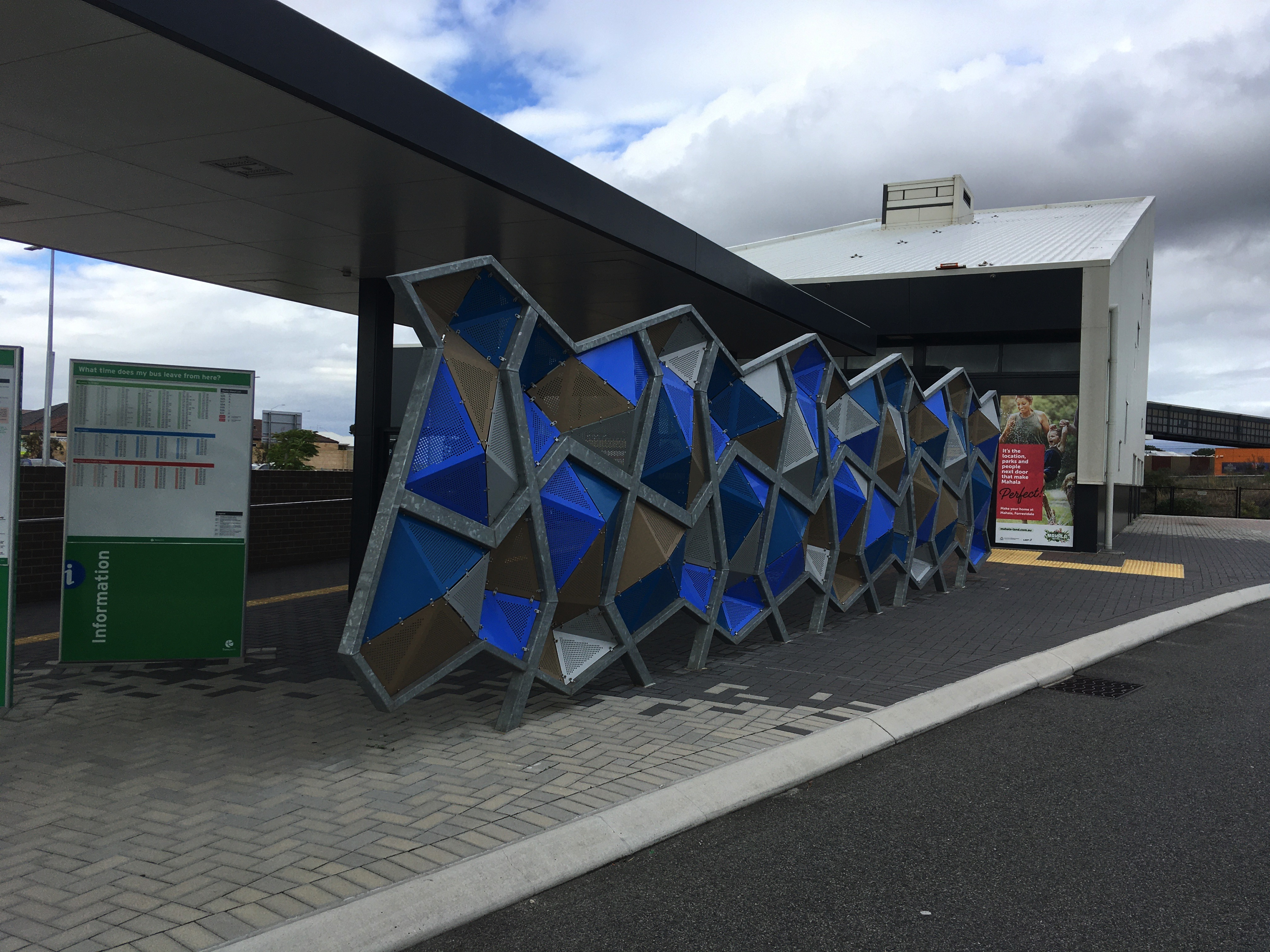
Connections, situated at the station's western entrance.

Outside the station's western entrance is a public art installation named Connections. Created by a three-person team from Midnight Tuesday, it is an 11-metre (36 ft) long screen consisting of a tessellating pattern of angled triangles on a galvanised steel frame. The triangles are coloured blue, silver and champagne. The structure provides a barrier between passengers and the prevailing south-westerly winds. The artwork was inspired by Banksia leaves and local wetlands.

== History ==
During the construction of the Mandurah line in the mid-2000s, the site of Aubin Grove station was identified as a possible location for a future railway station. The railway tracks were built with a gap for the station to be built later.

Ahead of the 2013 Western Australian state election, both major parties announced plans to build Aubin Grove station if elected. The Labor Party announced in June 2012 that it would build the station with 900 car parking bays, at a cost of A$45 million. In August, the Liberal Party, which was in government at the time, announced it would build the station with 2,000 car parking bays and order new trains, at a cost of $80 million. The station was planned to relieve pressure at Cockburn Central station, which has its carparks full at 7:11 am, the earliest of any Mandurah line station. In the same month, the government expanded an already existing order of 15 three car Transperth B-series trains by two, to cater for the new station. The Liberal Party won the election.

In July 2014, a tender was issued to build the station. Further details were given on the project, including that the station would open late 2016, and that it was predicted to cost $57 million, with the railcars costing $23 million. The daily patronage was predicted to be 3,900. In February 2015, CAMPS, which is a joint venture between Coniglio Ainsworth Architects and M. P. S. Architects, was selected to design the station, and Georgiou Group was selected as the contractor. The project used an early contractor involvement model, which meant that Georgiou provided input on the design for constructability, cost and timing.

In April 2015, the scope of the project was increased to include widening of the nearby Russell Road bridge over the Kwinana Freeway, in anticipation of increased traffic due to the station. This increased the project's budget to $105 million and delayed the completion date to early 2017. The bridge was to be duplicated, doubling the number of lanes across the freeway. The design of the station was released in November 2015. To minimise disruption to the freeway, the station had a modular design, to be built mostly off-site. Georgiou was awarded the construction contract in late 2015, with site preparations beginning soon after. Construction on the station began in March 2016. Aubin Grove station was the first island platform station to be built within a live rail environment in Western Australia. Ordinarily, trains would travel at over 100 kilometres per hour (62 mph) through the area, but during construction, the speed limit was lowered to 40 kilometres per hour (25 mph).

In April 2016, the project's cost was increased again, to $120 million. Transport Minister Dean Nalder attributed the cost increase to a widening of the project's scope. During the middle of 2016, in order to lift the modular structural pieces into place, construct the pedestrian bridge, and construct the Russell Road bridge widening, there were three consecutive weekend closures to the Mandurah line and the Kwinana Freeway. The freeway was diverted to the Russell Road on and off ramps during these closures, and Russell Road was closed. Georgiou chose to do three longer closures rather than do more closures that are shorter in time. Each closure was 30 hours long, which was the longest ever freeway closure in Western Australia. Main Roads was reluctant to approve the closures, only doing so the week before the first closure. During construction, it was discovered that mulch laid down in August 2016 contained asbestos. The mulch was removed in November 2016. Main Roads said that "only small traces of non-friable asbestos containing material was discovered", and that "the pieces were bonded and not airborne, so the health risk was negligible".

The road upgrades were completed in December 2016. On 23 April 2017, the station was opened by Mark McGowan, the Premier of Western Australia, and Rita Saffioti, the Minister for Transport. In a statement, McGowan recognised the former premier Colin Barnett's role in starting the project. The first train stopped at the station at 10:56 am that day. The final cost was $125 million. Since opening, it has been nominated for and won several construction awards. The state-based awards won are the Civil Contractors Federation Earth Award, the Master Builders Australia Excellence in Construction Award for Best Government Building and the Australian Institute of Building Professional Excellence in Building Award for Infrastructure. The project also won the national Australian Institute of Building Professional Excellence in Building Award for Infrastructure.

== Services ==
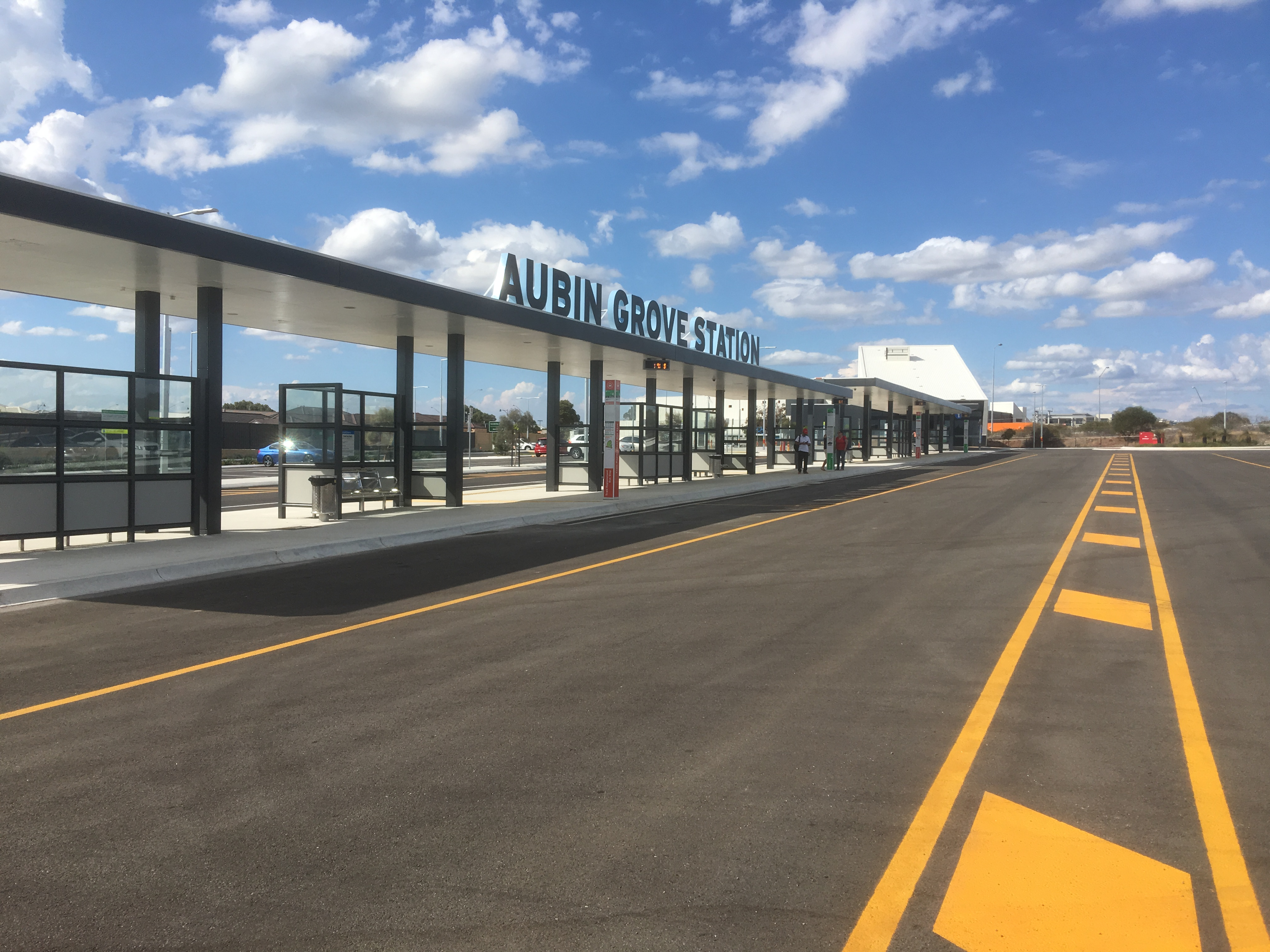
Aubin Grove bus interchange

=== Trains ===
Aubin Grove station is served by the Mandurah line on the Transperth network. These services are operated by the Public Transport Authority. The line goes between Mandurah station and Perth station, continuing north from there as the Yanchep line. Mandurah line trains stop at the station every 10 minutes during peak on weekdays and every 15 minutes during the day outside peak every day of the year except Christmas Day. At night, trains are half-hourly or hourly. After the opening of the Thornlie-Cockburn Line in 2025, Stadium event services depart from Mandurah Station, and run to Perth Stadium via the Glen Iris tunnel. It stops at all stations on the Mandurah and Thornlie-Cockburn lines before running express from Thornlie to Perth Stadium.

==== Platforms ====
Aubin Grove platform arrangement
Stop ID	Platform	Line	Service Pattern	Destination	Via	Notes
99671	1	Mandurah line	All stations	Perth	Murdoch	
99672	2	Mandurah line	All stations	Mandurah		

=== Buses ===
Aubin Grove station has a bus interchange with four bus stands. Bus services are operated by Swan Transit and Transdev WA under contract. Some services also may deviate, such as the 526 bus to Success Primary School.

Until the 2026 school year, a once a day bus service route 534 operated between the station and Wattleup on school days only.

| ‘ | = Stops at Cockburn Gateways Shopping City

| * | = Destination varies depending on the rail replacement needed.

Route number	Destination	Via	Bus Stand	Notes
535	Hammond Park, Hammond Road	Macquarie Blvd	1	
536	Hammond Park Secondary College	Barfield Road	1	
537	Wandi, Cordata Av	Lyon Road	2	
525’	Cockburn Central Station	Bannigan Av	3	
526’	Cockburn Central Station	Wentworth Pde	3	
527’	Cockburn Central Station	Brenchley Drive	4	Services the nearby Harvest Lakes shopping centre.
909*	Perth Station*	Kwinana Freeway*		Departs as a rail replacement when train services are all unavailable.

=== Bus Deviations ===
Route number	Deviation Symbol	Deviates To	Notes
525	S	Emmanuel Catholic College	Operates on School Days only.
526	D, S, A	D: Southern Cross Retirement Village S: Success Primary School A: Combination of D and S.	Deviation S operates on school days only.
527	A, S	A: Departs from Atwell College S: Departs To Atwell College	Operates on School Days only.
535	S	Hammond Park Secondary College	Operates on School Days Only.
537	A, S	A: Departs from Hammond Park Secondary College S: Runs express to Hammond Park Secondary College	Operates On School Days Only.
