= Atwell College =

Location
- Atwell, Western Australia; Australia; 32°08′42″S 115°51′51″E

Information
- Type: Independent public co-educational high day school
- Motto: Embracing the Future
- Established: 2008; 18 years ago
- Educational authority: WA Department of Education
- Principal: Darren Payton
- Staff: 191
- Years: 7–12
- Enrolment: 1,421 (2020)
- Campus type: Suburban
- Colours: Maroon, navy blue and white
- Website: www.atwellcollege.wa.edu.au

Atwell College is an independent public secondary school in the southern Perth suburb of Atwell, Western Australia.

== Overview ==
Atwell College achieved Independent Public School status in 2011. The college's first principal was Steven Crake; he was succeeded in 2012 by Noel Woodley and in 2019 by Peter Rudrum. The college provides specialist programs for rugby and netball. Extra curricular programs are also offered in areas of academic extension, music, dance and drama. The college had an enrolment of 1,261 in Semester 1, 2022.

== History ==
On Tuesday, 23 November 2004, then Education and Training Minister Alan Carpenter announced a $23million secondary school to open in Atwell on the corner of Bartram Road and Brenchley Drive in January 2008. The college was to cater for students from the Atwell, Harmony and Jandakot primary schools, with an estimated 200 students expected to enrol at the college for the 2008 school year.

=== Stage 1 ===
Construction of Atwell Stage 1 commenced on 3 February 2007. Due to very tight timeframes the completion of Atwell Stage 1 was required to be undertaken in two stages in order to open the Kim Beazley Learning Community (KBLC) and the Year 7 Learning Communities for the start of the 2008 school year. This meant that the KBLC and the Year 7 Learning Communities were operational before Stage 1 was completed. On Friday, 27 February 2009, then Education Minister Liz Constable officially opened Atwell College. Stage 1 costed a total of A$37.6 million and catered for 680 mainstream students in Years 7–9 and high needs education support students. Stage 1 included a performing arts centre, cafeteria, resource centre, student services centre, gymnasium, administrative block and four learning centres. Atwell College by JCY Architects and Urban Designers received an entry for the Department of Treasury and Finance Building Management and Works Award in July 2009 from the Australian Institute of Architects State Awards.

=== Stage 2 ===
Construction of Atwell Stage 2 commenced on 6 December 2010. The college introduced a Year 11 cohort in 2011 and then a Year 12 cohort in 2012. Atwell Stage 2 was completed on 1 January 2012 to house the additional students costing a total of A$21 million. In this second stage included another learning centre, renovations to already existing buildings from Stage 1 and a two-level senior learning building equipped with classrooms, materials technology workshops and studios, a lecture theatre and IT infrastructure supporting laptop learning. While this newly built two-level senior learning building was originally designed to be used for students in Years 11 and 12, it was later made available to all cohorts. Complications with the site were unstable soils which required the installation of 262 screw piles before construction of Stage 2 could commence.

=== Fire ===
On 27 March 2017, a fire was reported at 2:45 am in the college's Library and was later found to have been started in the air-conditioning unit above the building. Damage was estimated at over A$1 million, including damage to adjacent buildings such as the Cafeteria and Student Services which suffered damage to internet and phone lines. The fire was believed to have been deliberately lit, with signs of forced entry into the building. The WA Department of Education assisted with recovery. The college had been offered assistance from the wider Perth library community as well.

== Local intake area ==
With the completion of Hammond Park Secondary College in late 2019, the WA Department of Education revised Atwell College's intake area, removing 3 feeder primary schools and excluding residents in Hammond Park, Aubin Grove and Honeywood from enrolling at the college. Atwell College enrols students in Years 7–12 from the suburbs of Atwell, Success, Treeby and Banjup. Feeder primary schools are Atwell Primary School, Harmony Primary School, Success Primary School and Jandakot Primary School.

== Student Numbers ==
Year	Number
2019	1445
2020	1418
2021	1360
2022	1211
2023	1054

== Academic ranking ==
Western Australia school ATAR ranking

Year	Rank	Median ATAR	Eligible Year 12 students	Students with an ATAR	% students with an ATAR
2019	114	70.85	170	37	21.76
2018	132	64.90	183	44	24.04
2017	107	72.75	149	27	18.12
2016	133	62.90	159	43	27.04

== See also ==
- List of schools in the Perth metropolitan area
