= Atwell, Western Australia =

Atwell
- Suburb
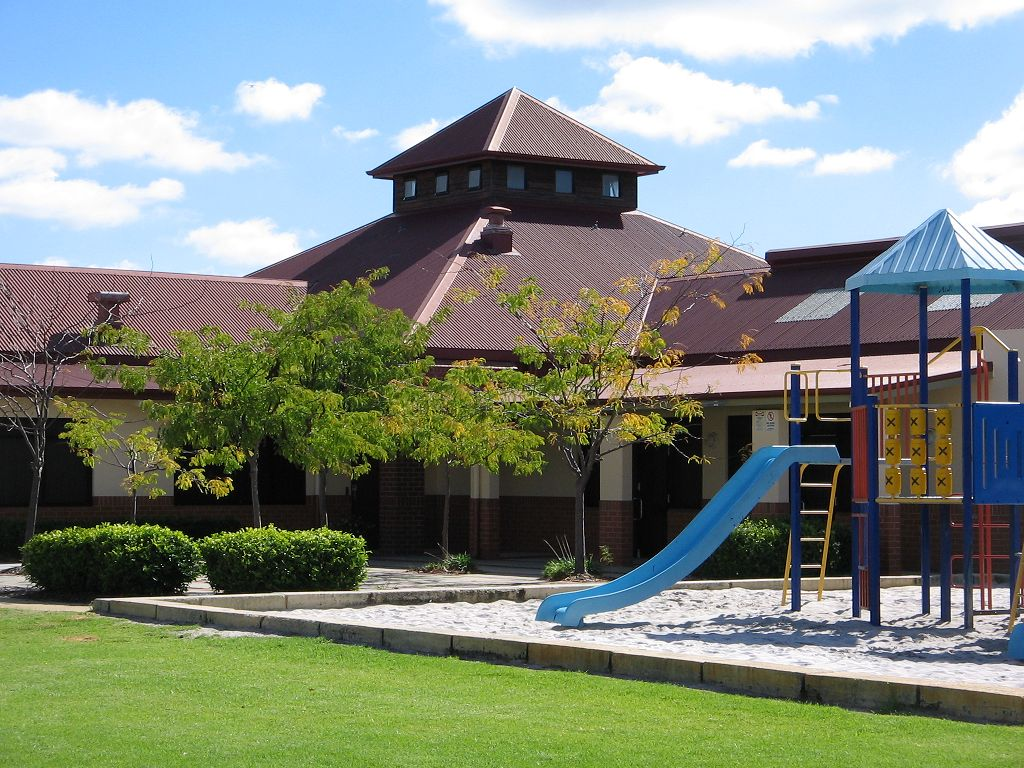
- Community centre in Atwell
- Interactive map of Atwell
- Coordinates: 32.143°S 115.867°E
- Country: Australia
- State: Western Australia
- City: Perth
- LGA: City of Cockburn, East Ward

Government
  - State electorate: Cockburn
  - Federal division: Fremantle

Area
  - Total: 3.5 km^{2} (1.4 sq mi)

Population
  - Total: 9,287 (SAL 2021)
- Postcode: 6164
Suburbs around Atwell
Cockburn Central	Jandakot	Treeby
Success	Atwell	Banjup
Hammond Park	Aubin Grove	Banjup

Atwell is a suburb within the metropolitan area of Perth, Western Australia, situated 21 kilometres (13 mi) south of Perth City, and located in the City of Cockburn local government area.

== Geography ==
Situated on the Swan coastal plain, between the coast, and the Darling Scarp, the terrain is generally flat, with many small natural and created wetlands. It is situated on the western boundary of the Jandakot ground water protection area, and hence suburban development to the east is not permitted. It is bounded to the north by Armadale Road, the Kwinana Freeway to the west, Tapper Road to the east and to the south by Gibbs Road.

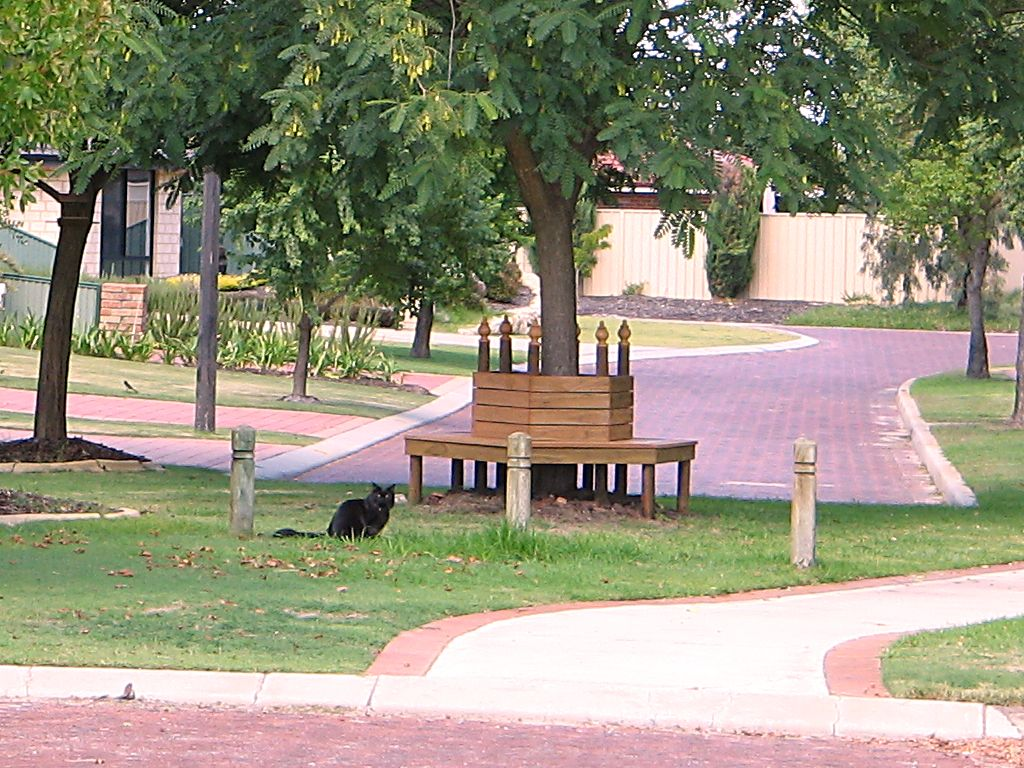
Street in Atwell

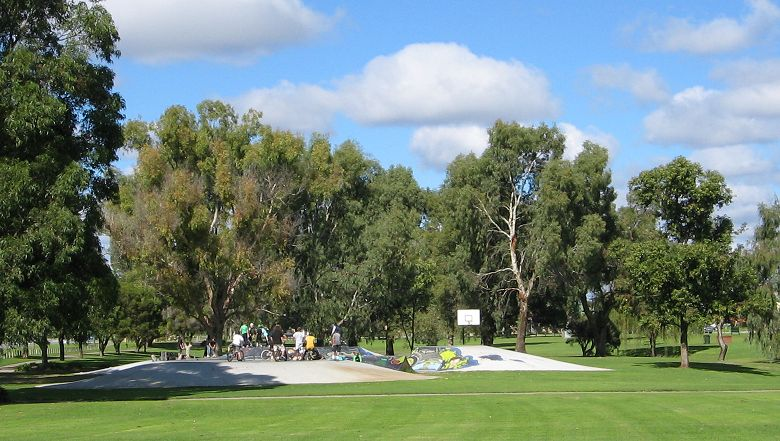
Skate park in Atwell

== History ==
The Whadjuk Nyungar Aboriginal people were the first human inhabitants of the region, occupying the region from 40,000 years ago. The many lakes and wetlands of the region were important for sustenance and spiritually.

After European settlement of the Perth region in 1829, the land of much of the area including and surrounding what is now Atwell was granted to G Dunnage. The area was later part of the dairy property owned and operated for many years by Ernest Atwell. Originally it was purchased in the 1920s to rest horses he used in his livery stable business, which was conducted in Fremantle. It was later developed into one of the largest dairies in the Perth region. The huge amount of land was slowly sold off but the dairy was still operating until the late 1950s. The house and worker’s cottage were eventually demolished when the area was cleared for redevelopment.

Development of the suburb of Atwell began in the early 1990s through the creation of several housing estates such as Beeliar parklands. It has continued to expand with the estates, Atwell Waters, and Harvest Lakes being developed. Most of the available land in the suburb has now been developed for residential, parks and reserves, roads and some retail.

== Statistics ==
Selected medians and averages from the 2016 census:

Class	Atwell	Perth	Australia
Total Population	10121	1,943,858	23,401,892
Median age	33	36	38
Average household size (persons)	3.2	2.6	2.6
Australian born	63.4%	57.3%	66.7%
Median household income (weekly)	$2201	$1643	$1438
Median rent (weekly)	$430	$360	$335
Median housing loan repayment (monthly)	$2100	$2000	$1755

Selected medians and averages from the 2011 census:

Class	Atwell	Perth	Australia
Total Population	10,121	1,728,867	21,507,717
Median age	32	36	37
Average household size (persons)	3.1	2.6	2.6
Australian born	66.3%	62.9%	69.8%
Median household income (weekly)	$2110	$1722	$1481
Median rent (weekly)	$400	$300	$285
Median housing loan repayment (monthly)	$2167	$1950	$1800

== Services ==
=== Community centres ===
There are two community centres in Atwell. The Atwell Community Centre on Reynardson Ave, and the Harvest Lakes Community Centre, situated in the grounds of Harmony Primary School.

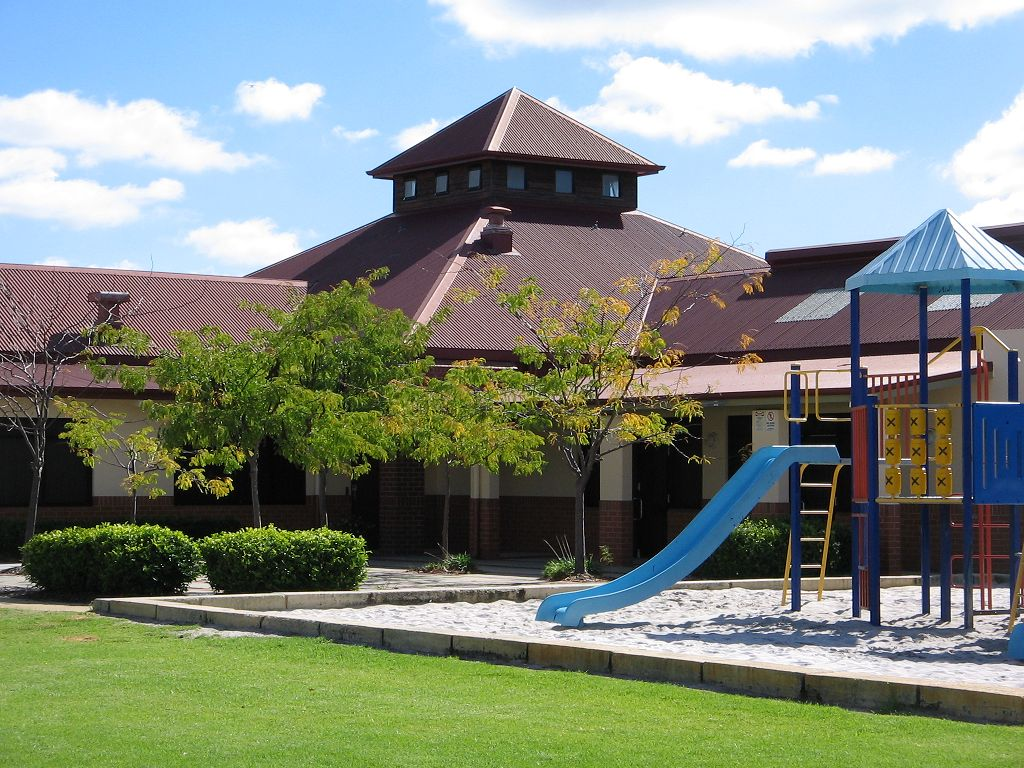
Community centre in Atwell

=== Education ===
There are two primary schools in Atwell. Atwell Primary School was established in 1998 and had 773 students in Semester 1 of 2020. Harmony Primary School was established in 2004 and had 550 students in Semester 1 of 2020. The senior high school, Atwell College, established in 2008, had 1421 students in Semester 1 of 2020. Atwell College also incorporates the Kim Beazley Learning Community that enables the full-spectrum of opportunities for students with disabilities. There are also two child care centres that cater primarily for non-school age children.

=== Health ===
Atwell currently has a general practitioner's medical centre, an infant health clinic, a pharmacy and a physiotherapy clinic, near the retail precinct on Reynardson Ave. A second medical centre, pharmacies, physiotherapy clinic and an Optometrist have been established at the Harvest lakes retail precinct.

=== Retail ===
There are three retail precincts in Atwell. A small centre in the north on Lydon Blvd was opened in the late 1990s, consisting of a delicatessen and a Chinese restaurant. A second larger centre was opened on Reynardson Ave in central Atwell in the early 2000s consisting of a supermarket and several other food and service stores. A third shopping centre was completed in June 2014 in Harvest Lakes that consists of a Woolworths supermarket, a Cafe', Chinese and Italian restaurants and several other food and service stores.

== Recreation ==
=== Leisure ===
Atwell has a large number of parks and reserves. The two major parks are Atwell reserve, which has a lake, playgrounds, skate park and barbecue facilities and Harvest lakes park which has a lake and playgrounds.

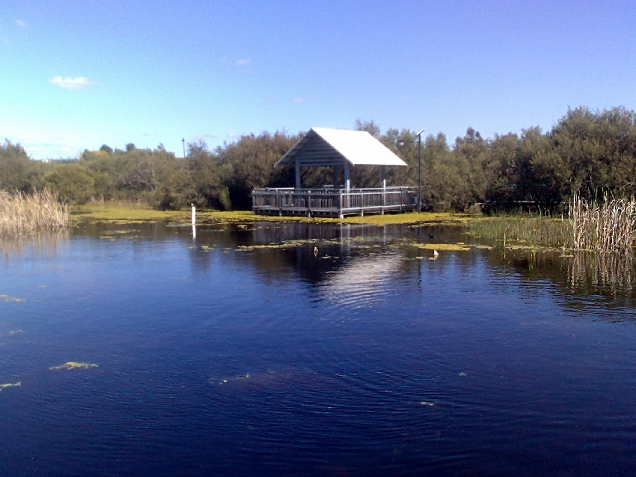
Wetland in Harvest lakes, Atwell

=== Sports ===
Atwell Oval is the main sporting ground with two sports fields for Football in Winter and Cricket in Summer. It has a clubhouse and change rooms for the Jandakot Jets Junior Football Club which plays Australian rules football, as well as Jandakot Lakes Junior Cricket Club which plays cricket. In addition, Softball and Tee ball are also played here. Atwell and Harmony Primary school ovals are open to the public and have cricket pitches and nets.

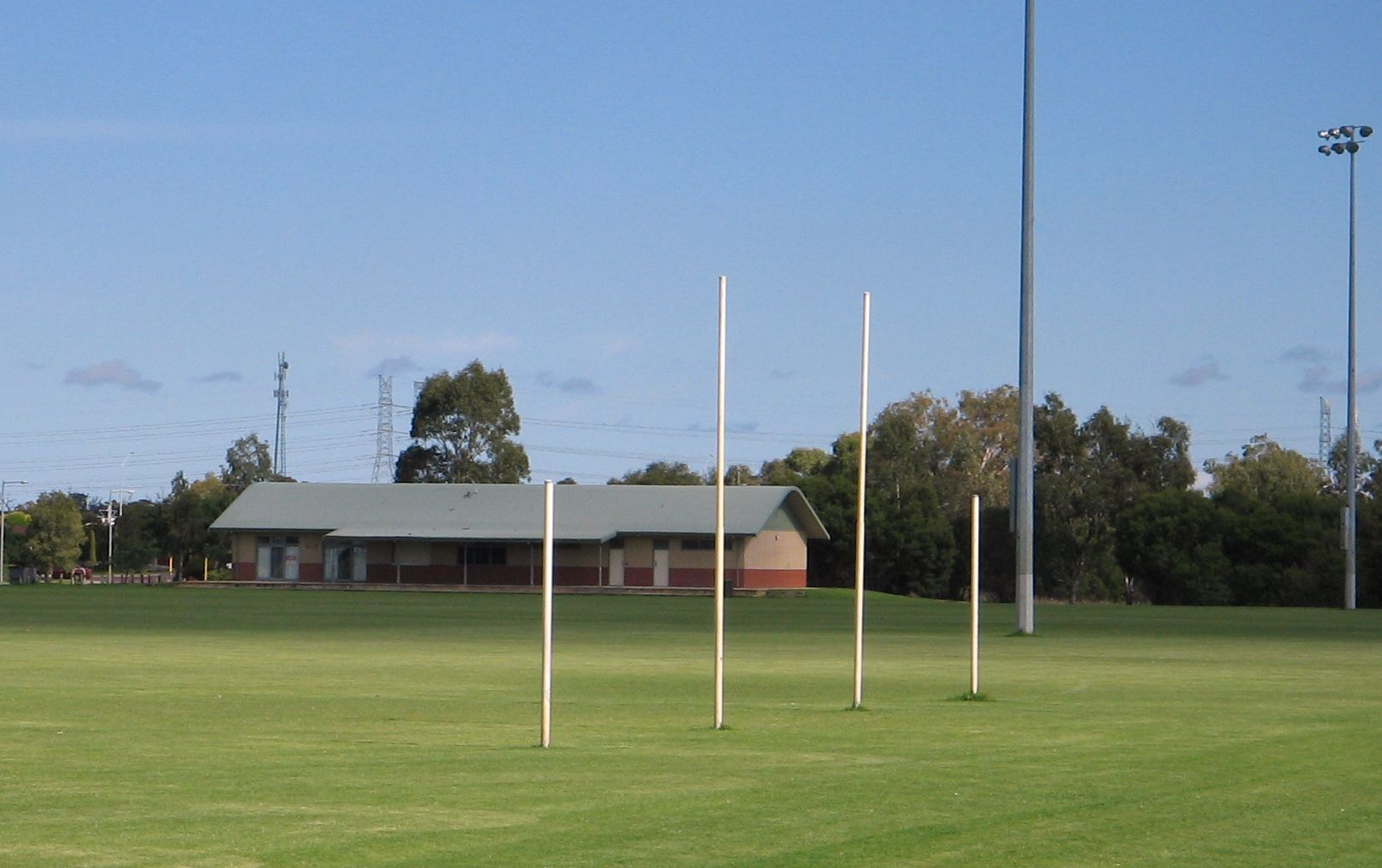
Atwell Oval

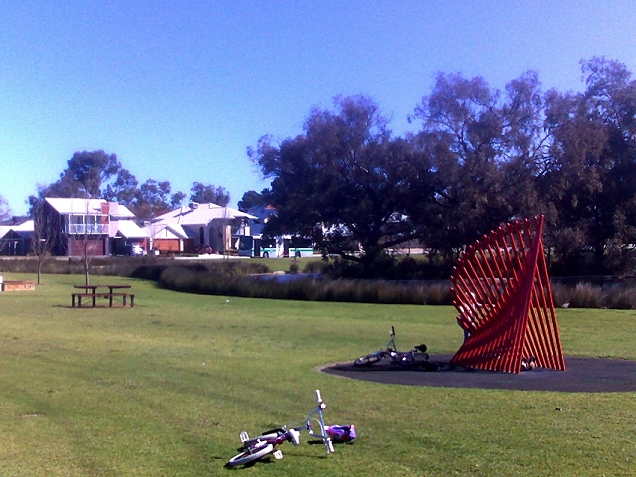
Park in Harvest lakes, Atwell

== Transport ==
=== Public ===
Regular bus services on route 527, operates North to Cockburn Central railway station, located just outside the North Western boundary of Atwell, and Gateways regional shopping centre in Success, and South to Aubin Grove and Honeywood estate in Wandi. Train services connect to Perth and Mandurah. Aubin Grove train station which actually straddles Atwell and Success opened in April 2017.

==== Bus ====
- 233 Cockburn Central Station to Gosnells Station – serves Beeliar Drive and Armadale Road
- 518 Cockburn Central Station to Murdoch TAFE – serves Beeliar Drive and Armadale Road
- 523 Cockburn Central Station to Treeby – serves Beeliar Drive and Armadale Road
- 527 Cockburn Central Station to Aubin Grove Station – serves Beeliar Drive, Armadale Road, Tapper Road, Lydon Boulevard, Waters Avenue, Brenchley Drive, Beenyup Road, Harmony Avenue, Harvest Lakes Boulevard and Lyon Road

==== Rail ====
- Mandurah Line
  - Aubin Grove Station

=== Road ===
Atwell is well connected with transport infrastructure, being situated adjacent to a transport hub at Perth's southern approaches. Access to Perth in the North and Rockingham / Mandurah in the South is via the Kwinana Freeway which is accessible via interchanges at Armadale Road and Gibbs Road. East Access to Armadale is via Armadale Road. Western access to Fremantle is via Beeliar Drive and North Lake Road.

=== Pedestrian and cycling ===
Footpaths and dual use cycle paths are present on all of the major roads within Atwell. A dual use path on Armadale Road leads to the Kwinana Freeway dual use path, which connects to the more than 750 km cycle routes in the Perth Region.
