= Logan Howlett =

Australian mayor

Logan Howlett is the mayor of the City of Cockburn in Western Australia. He was elected mayor in March 2009 after the previous mayor, Stephen Lee, resigned and an extraordinary election was held. In October 2009, he was re-elected mayor during the regular local government elections for a four-year term. He won again in 2013, 2017 and 2021.

Together with his wife Pat, Howlett has lived in Cockburn for more than 45 years. He is also a justice of the peace and Fellow of the Australian College of Health Service Executives and has executive level experience, represented industry and small business at state and national levels and previously served nine years as a Cockburn councillor (1990-1999).

== Sources ==
- http://www.cockburn.wa.gov.au
- Time to Move on, Fleur Mason, Cockburn Gazette, 10 March 2009.
- The message is NO, Fleur Mason, Cockburn Gazette, 20 October 2009.
- Thomson, Chris (18 October 2009). "Bayswater aggro ends reign of Lou Magro". WA Today.
- "Leadership clash". Cockburn Gazette. 22 January 2009. Archived from the original on 1 March 2012.
- Howlett elected as Cockburn's new mayor, Fleur Mason, Cockburn Gazette, 6 March 2009.
- "New mayor at City of Cockburn". ABC Online. 6 March 2009. Archived from the original on 8 March 2009.
