= Hammond Park Secondary College =

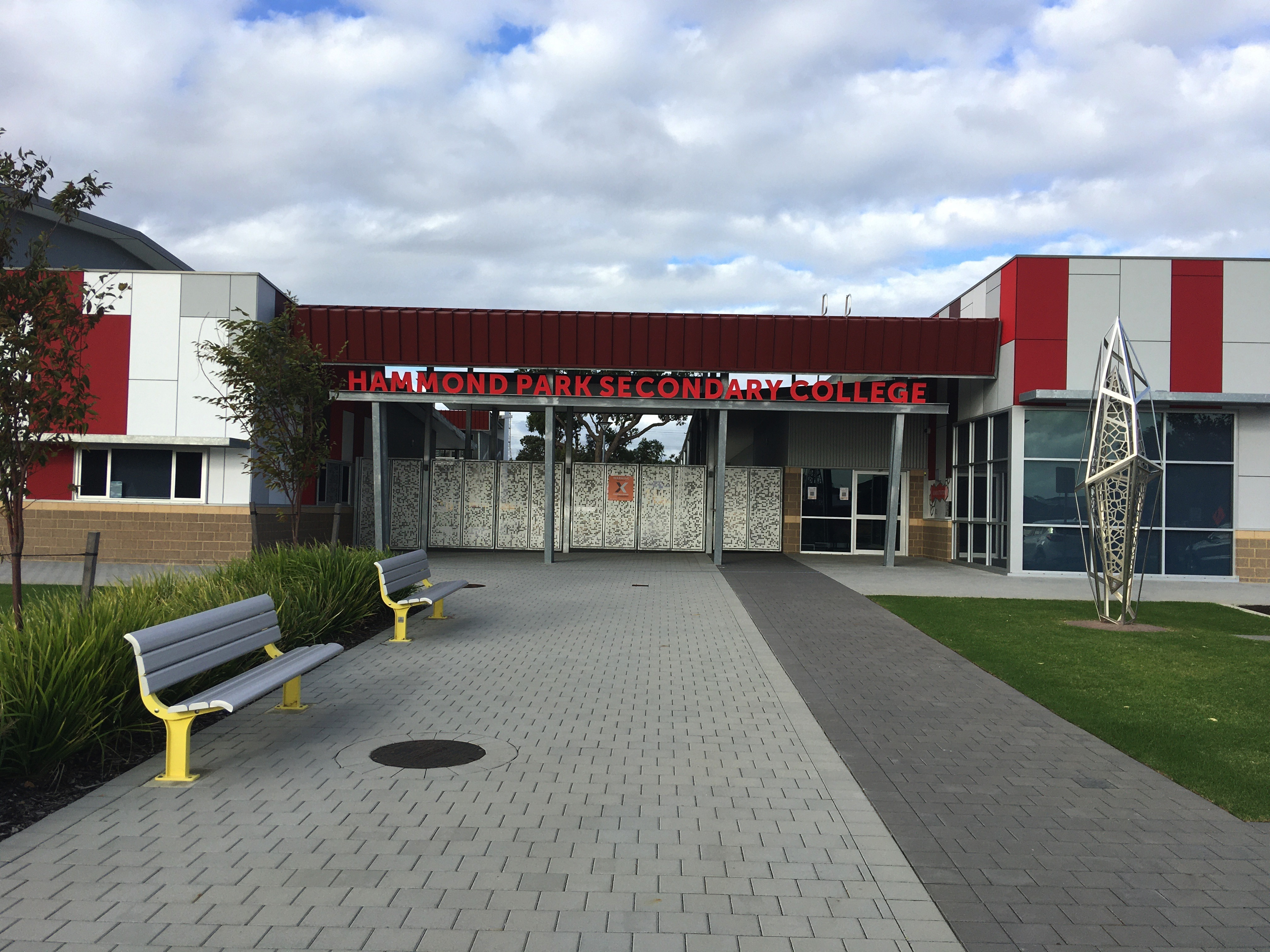
- Hammond Park Secondary College in April 2021

Location
- 55 Irvine Parade; Hammond Park, Western Australia; Australia; 32°10′30″S 115°51′04″E

Information
- Type: Independent public co-educational day school
- Motto: Connect, Empower, Innovate
- Established: 2020; 6 years ago
- Educational authority: WA Department of Education
- Principal: Joanne Willesee
- Years: 7–12
- Enrolment: 1144 (2026)
- Campus type: Suburban
- Website: https://www.hammondparksc.wa.edu.au

Hammond Park Secondary College is an independent public co-educational high day school, located in the Perth suburb of Hammond Park, Western Australia.

== Overview ==
Hammond Park Secondary College opened in 2020 with 175 foundation Year 7 students. It is situated in Perth's growing suburb of Hammond Park. The first stage of the school had a student capacity of 725, and was built at a cost of $53.75 million. The second stage, which opened in 2023, with a planned capacity of 1,450 students between Years 7 and 12, and a cost of $16.79 million. The school was built as part of the "WA Schools Public Private Partnership Project", in which a private corporation designs, builds, finances and maintains eight schools in Perth, under contract from the Western Australian government.

== Local intake area ==
Hammond Park Secondary College's local intake area covers Aubin Grove, Banjup (south of Gibbs Road), Hammond Park, Henderson (south of Cockburn Road), Mandogalup, Wattleup and Wandi. Students living in the local intake area have a guaranteed place at the school if they apply.

== See also ==
- List of schools in the Perth metropolitan area
