= City of Cockburn =

Coordinates: 32°10′S 115°50′E

- Local government area
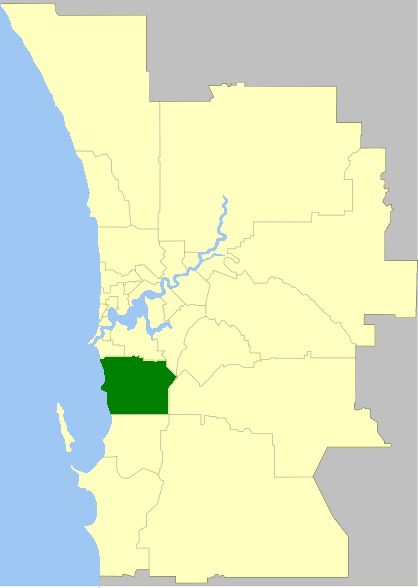
- The City of Cockburn within the Perth Metropolitan Area

- Interactive map of City of Cockburn
- Country: Australia
- State: Western Australia
- Region: South Metropolitan Perth
- Established: 1871
- Council seat: Spearwood

Government
  - Mayor: Logan Howlett
  - State electorate: Cockburn, Fremantle, Jandakot, Bibra Lake, Oakford
  - Federal division: Fremantle, Tangney

Area
  - Total: 167.9 km^{2} (64.8 sq mi)

Population
  - Total: 118,091 (LGA 2021)
  - Density: 703.34/km^{2} (1,821.6/sq mi)
- Website: City of Cockburn
LGAs around City of Cockburn
Fremantle	Melville	Canning; Gosnells
	City of Cockburn	Armadale
	Kwinana	Serpentine- Jarrahdale

The City of Cockburn (/ˈkoʊbərn/ KOH-bərn) is a local government area in the southern suburbs of the Western Australian capital city of Perth about 8 kilometres (5 mi) south of Fremantle and about 24 kilometres (15 mi) south of Perth's central business district. The City covers an area of 167.5 square kilometres (64.7 sq mi) and had a population of over 104,000 as at the 2016 Census.

== History ==
Cockburn is named after Cockburn Sound, which was named in 1827 by Captain James Stirling after Admiral Sir George Cockburn. Sir George was born in London in 1772 and was a renowned British naval officer, eventually becoming Admiral of the Fleet and First Sea Lord. He served under Horatio Nelson during the war with France, but came to public attention and was granted his knighthood for his service in the War of 1812, in particular for the burning of Washington in 1814. It was he who took Napoleon to exile on the island of Saint Helena after the Battle of Waterloo in 1815.

In 1871, the Fremantle Road District was created under the District Roads Act 1871 to cover the area to the south and east of Fremantle, and the Fremantle Road Board was created to manage it. The original District was bounded on the north by the Swan River from Fremantle to the mouth of the Canning River; on the east by a line from Bull Creek to the junction of what is now the intersection of the Albany and South Western Highways in Armadale; on the south by a line from Armadale to, and including the Rockingham townsite; and to the west by the Indian Ocean.

In the first five years of the Board's existence most of its members served on the Fremantle Town Council. The function of the Board was simply to provide the roads that linked Fremantle to other parts of the Colony. By 1913 the District was divided into Wards, each electing representatives to the Board. In 1922 the Board constructed new offices at the corner of Forrest and Rockingham Roads.

In July 1923, the District received a large amount of land (gaining the localities of Atwell and Banjup and 75% of the Jandakot locality) from Jandakot Road District when that entity was abolished. On 21 January 1955, it was renamed Cockburn, after a successful referendum underlined the desire for recognition of the District's independence from Fremantle.

On 1 July 1961, Cockburn Road District became a shire following the enactment of the Local Government Act 1960, and on 24 January 1971, almost exactly 100 years after the formation of the Fremantle Road District, it became a Town in recognition of its increasingly urban nature. On 26 October 1979 the town attained City status.

In May 1966, Rottnest Island and Carnac Island were included in the boundaries of the Shire of Cockburn. However, the council has "no involvement in or responsibility for any functions relating to the control and management of the islands", which are administered directly by state government agencies.

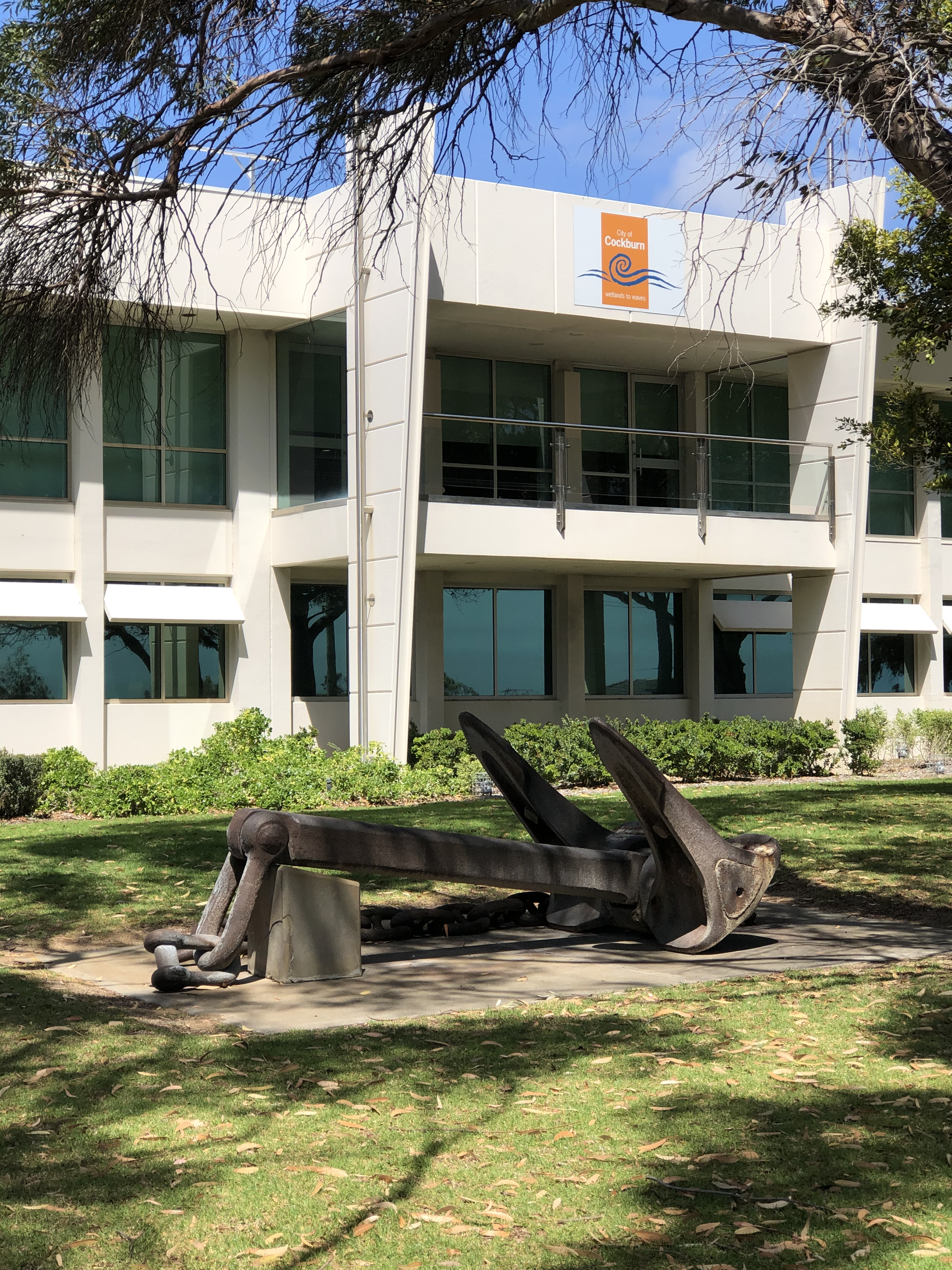
City of Cockburn Administrative Offices in Spearwood

A public inquiry into corruption in the City of Cockburn was held in 1999. The Council was suspended in April 1999 and dismissed on 30 June 2000, with administrators running the council until an election held on 6 December 2000. In 2007 the City of Cockburn was again embroiled in controversy as alleged evidence of corruption arose at the Corruption and Crime Commission.

=== Protests in the City of Cockburn ===
The population has come together as a community to protest for and against many developments within the areas that are now emcompassed with the cities boundaries. From early arrival of Europeans settlers as part of the Swan River Colony to saving the last of the wetlands in the area.

== Wards ==
The city is divided into three wards, each electing three councillors. The mayor is directly elected.

- East Ward
- West Ward
- Central Ward

== Suburbs ==
The suburbs of the City of Cockburn with population and size figures based on the most recent Australian census:

Suburb	Population	Area	Map
Atwell	9,287 (SAL 2021)	3.5 km^{2} (1.4 sq mi)	
Aubin Grove	6,786 (SAL 2021)	2.5 km^{2} (0.97 sq mi)	
Banjup	1,377 (SAL 2021)	22.5 km^{2} (8.7 sq mi)	
Beeliar	8,617 (SAL 2021)	11.4 km^{2} (4.4 sq mi)	
Bibra Lake	5,892 (SAL 2021)	12.8 km^{2} (4.9 sq mi)	
Cockburn Central	1,521 (SAL 2021)	2.8 km^{2} (1.1 sq mi)	
Coogee	5,345 (SAL 2021)	5.3 km^{2} (2.0 sq mi)	
Coolbellup	5,698 (SAL 2021)	3.1 km^{2} (1.2 sq mi)	
Hamilton Hill	11,327 (SAL 2021)	6.6 km^{2} (2.5 sq mi)	
Hammond Park	6,985 (SAL 2021)	4.3 km^{2} (1.7 sq mi)	
Henderson	36 (SAL 2021)	8.7 km^{2} (3.4 sq mi)	
Jandakot	2,533 (SAL 2021)	16.2 km^{2} (6.3 sq mi)	
Lake Coogee	4,768 (SAL 2021)	3.4 km^{2} (1.3 sq mi)	
Leeming	10,883 (SAL 2021)	7.5 km^{2} (2.9 sq mi)	
Munster	199 (SAL 2021)	4.1 km^{2} (1.6 sq mi)	
North Coogee	3,741 (SAL 2021)	2.8 km^{2} (1.1 sq mi)	
North Lake	1,299 (SAL 2021)	2.3 km^{2} (0.89 sq mi)	
Rottnest Island	166 (SAL 2021)	19 km^{2} (7.3 sq mi)	
South Lake	5,831 (SAL 2021)	3.2 km^{2} (1.2 sq mi)	
Spearwood	10,944 (SAL 2021)	6.1 km^{2} (2.4 sq mi)	
Success	11,340 (SAL 2021)	6.1 km^{2} (2.4 sq mi)	
Treeby	4,214 (SAL 2021)	8.2 km^{2} (3.2 sq mi)	
Wattleup	443 (SAL 2021)	11.4 km^{2} (4.4 sq mi)	
Yangebup	7,631 (SAL 2021)	6 km^{2} (2.3 sq mi)	

== Population ==
Historical population

Year	Pop.	±% p.a.
1911	734	—
1921	1,278	+5.70%
1933	2,221	+4.71%
1947	3,049	+2.29%
1954	5,047	+7.47%
1961	7,827	+6.47%
1966	13,847	+12.09%
1971	25,011	+12.55%
1976	29,492	+3.35%

Year	Pop.	±% p.a.
1981	31,705	+1.46%
1986	40,711	+5.13%
1991	50,217	+4.29%
1996	57,102	+2.60%
2001	65,996	+2.94%
2006	74,472	+2.45%
2011	89,683	+3.79%
2016	104,473	+3.10%
2021	118,091	+2.48%

== Heritage-listed places ==
As of 2024, 140 places are heritage-listed in the City of Cockburn. Of the heritage-listed areas, 21 are on the State Register of Heritage Places; these include the Coogee Hotel, the Newmarket Hotel, and the Woodman Light.

== Sister cities ==
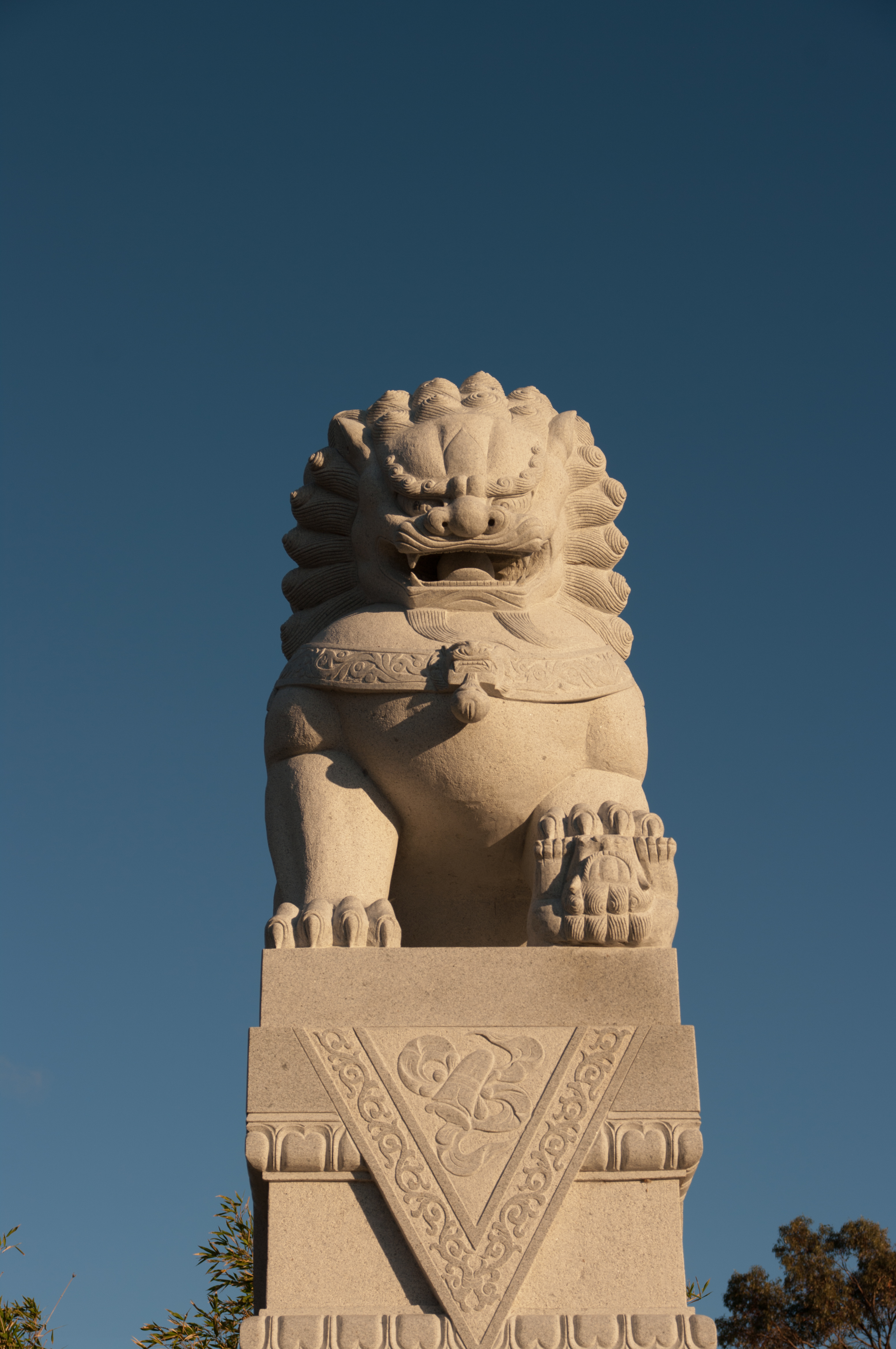
Statue on Spearwood Avenue recognising sister city of Yueyang

- Mobile, Alabama, United States – 28 September 2005
- Split, Croatia – 6 July 1998
- Yueyang, China – 28 November 1998
