= Cockburn Central railway station =

Railway station in Perth, Western Australia

Cockburn Central
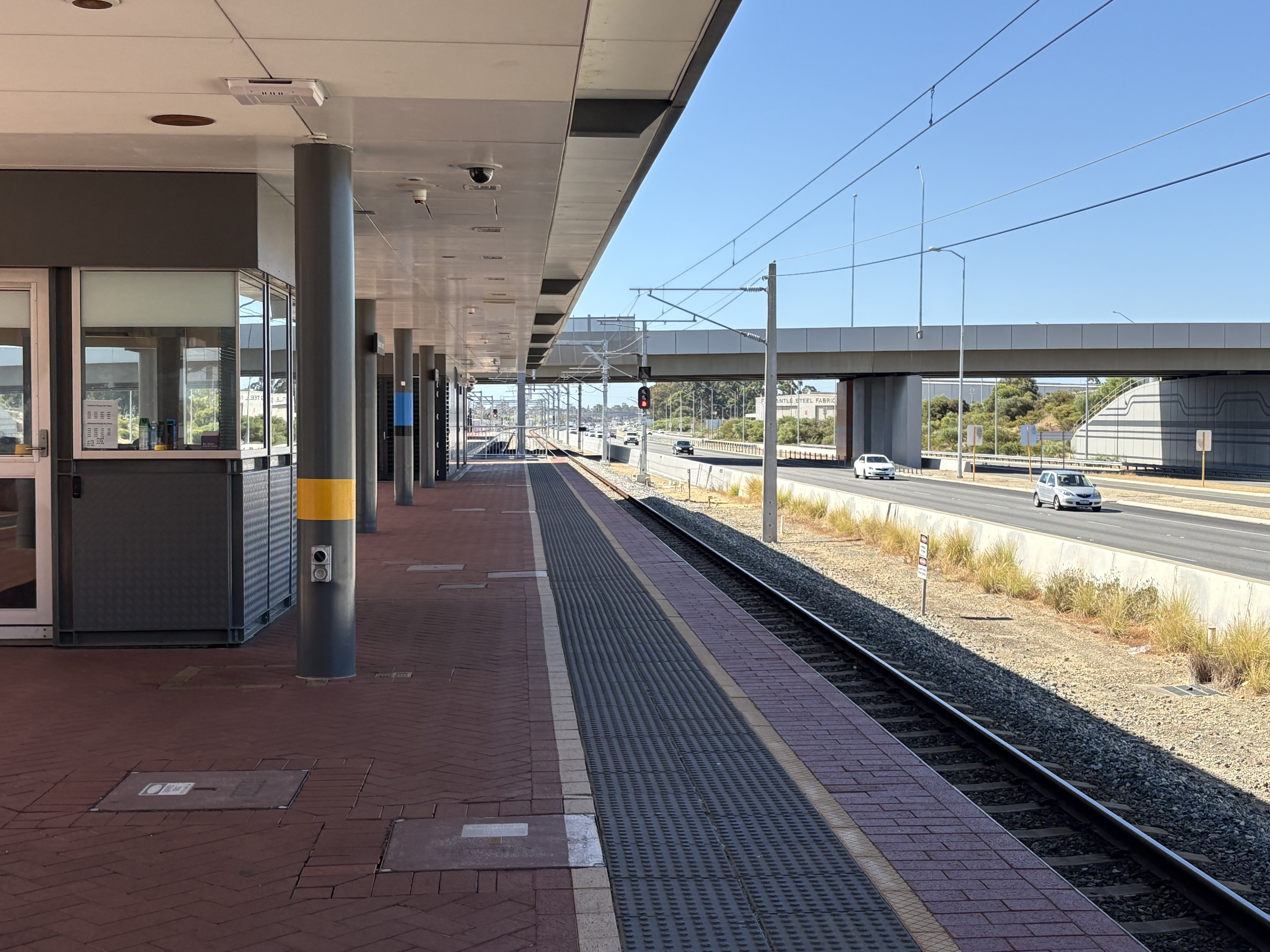
- Southbound view from platform 2, December 2025

General information
- Location: Kwinana Freeway, Cockburn Central and Jandakot, Western Australia; Australia
- Coordinates: 32°07′31″S 115°51′30″E
- Owner: Public Transport Authority
- Operator: Transperth
- Lines: Mandurah line; Thornlie–Cockburn line
- Distance: 20.5 kilometres from Perth
- Platforms: 3 (1 island with 1 side)
- Tracks: 3
- Bus routes: 17
- Bus stands: 12

Construction
- Structure type: Ground
- Parking: 395 bays
- Accessible: Yes

Other information
- Station code: RCL; 99661 (platform 1); 99662 (platform 2)
- Fare zone: 2

History
- Opened: 23 December 2007

Passengers
- 2013-14: 1,575,735

Services
Preceding station	Transperth	Following station
Murdoch towards Perth Underground	Mandurah line All	Aubin Grove towards Mandurah
Murdoch towards Perth Underground	Mandurah line W	Terminus
Ranford Road towards Perth	Thornlie–Cockburn line	Terminus
Events
Ranford Road towards Perth Stadium	Mandurah line Stadium special	Aubin Grove towards Rockingham or Mandurah
Location
- Location of Cockburn Central railway station

Cockburn Central station (/ˈkoʊbərn/ KOH-bərn) is a bus and railway station on the Transperth network. It is located at the juncture of the Mandurah and Thornlie–Cockburn lines, 20.5 kilometres (12.7 mi) from Perth station inside the median strip of the Kwinana Freeway serving the suburb of Cockburn Central.

== History ==
During planning, the station was known as Thomsons Lake station.

Cockburn Central railway station was designed to subsume the nearby Success Park 'n' Ride bus station. The Park 'n' Ride was established on 21 March 1999 and decommissioned on 22 December 2007, after the railway station opened.

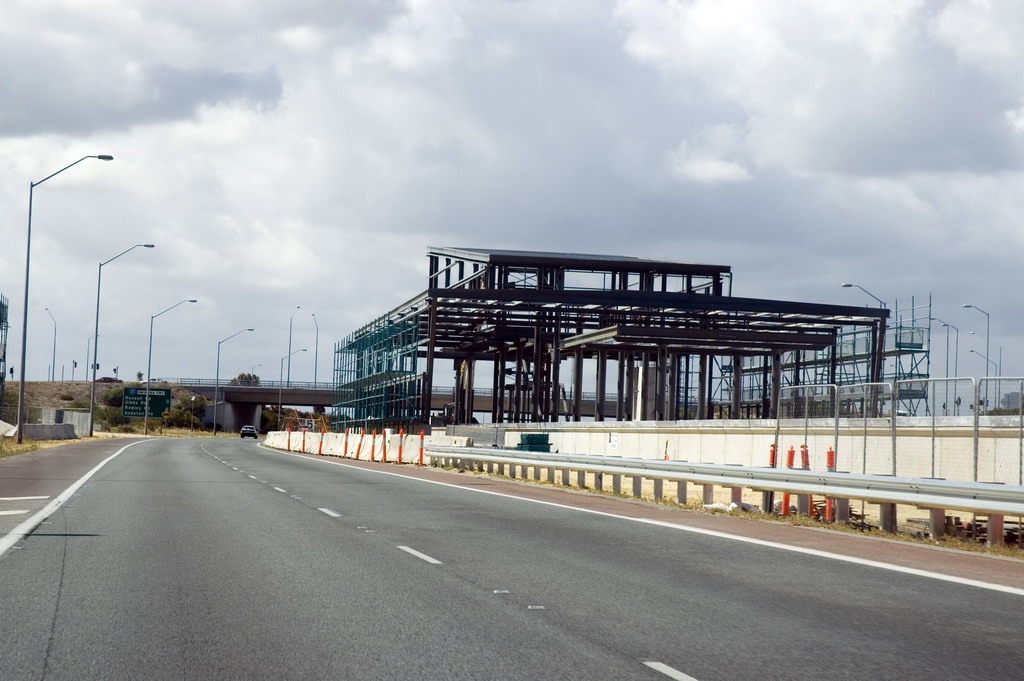
Cockburn Central station under construction in December 2005

The contract for the construction of Cockburn Central railway station, Kwinana railway station and Wellard railway station was awarded to the consortium of DORIC Constructions and Brierty Contractors in March 2005. This contract was labelled "package B", and had a cost of $32 million. Construction on the station began in mid-2005.

Cockburn Central station opened along with the rest of the Mandurah line on 23 December 2007. When the station opened, Cockburn Central became a suburb in its own right. Two linked turnback sidings lie to the south of the station, which are used by terminating services from Perth. A pair of crossovers were previously situated between the mainline tracks to the north of the station, but were removed during the 2021-2022 Thornlie-Cockburn Link realignment works.

== Thornlie-Cockburn Line ==
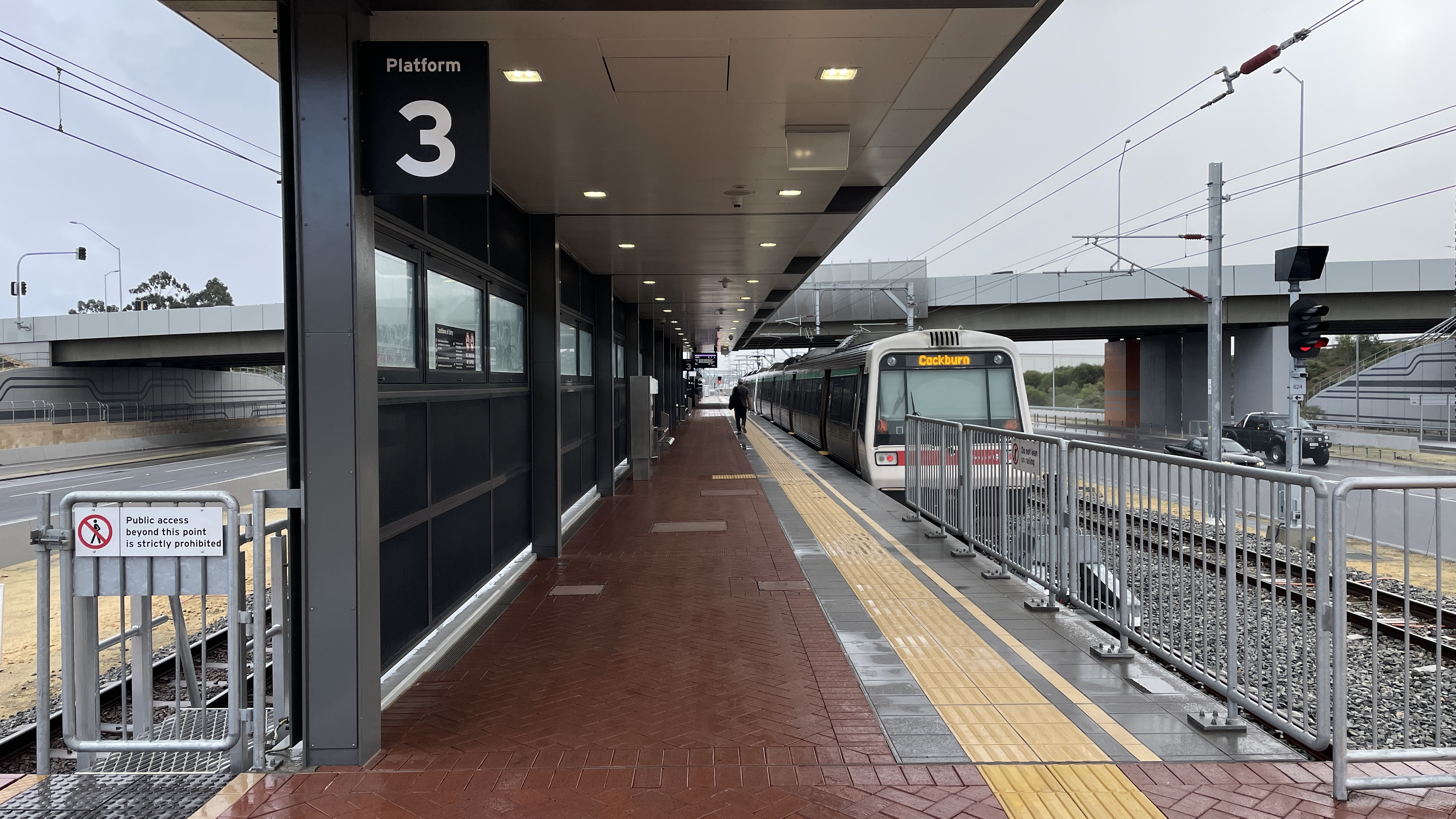
Platform 3

Cockburn Central became the terminus of the Thornlie–Cockburn line on 8 June 2025 when the Thornlie-Cockburn Link project was completed as part of Metronet. The platform at the station was extended north by 162 metres (531 ft) to create a new single platform for Thornlie-Cockburn Line trains to terminate at. The previous opening date for the line was 2023, but at the 2021–22 State Budget, it was announced that the Thornlie–Cockburn link had been deferred by 12 months, as a result of Western Australia's skills shortage. This was alongside the deferment of 15 other state government infrastructure projects. The revised opening date is 8 June 2025.

As part of a major realignment of railway tracks at the station, the Mandurah line was closed between Elizabeth Quay and Aubin Grove from 26 December 2021 to 14 January 2022. In this time, the existing Mandurah line tracks were moved to the edge of the rail corridor to make room for the new Thornlie–Cockburn line tracks that will take its place at the location. As part of this, new crossovers were created to enable full movements between the four tracks north of the station. This allows special event Mandurah Line trains to run direct to Perth Stadium.

== Services ==
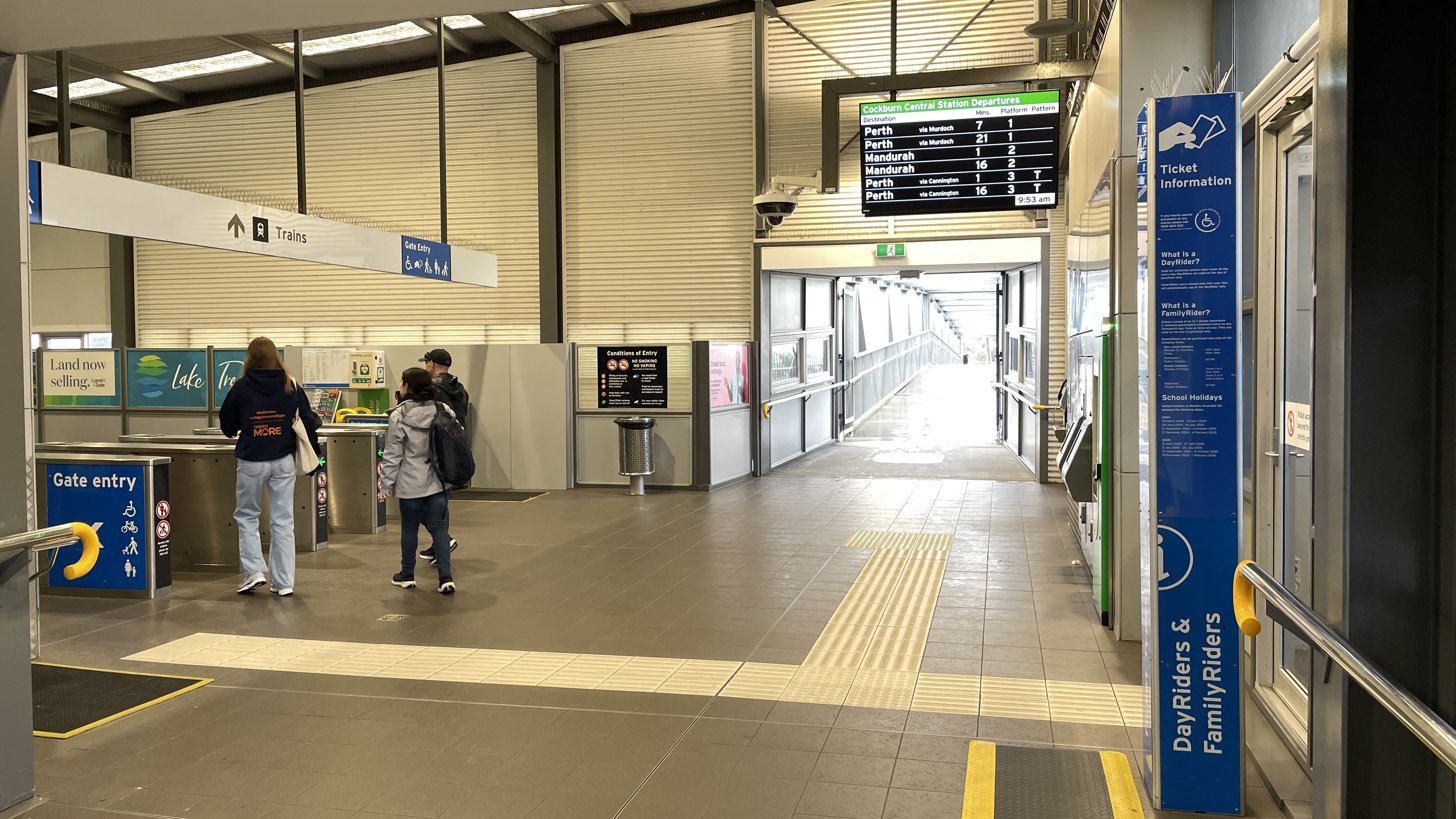
Concourse

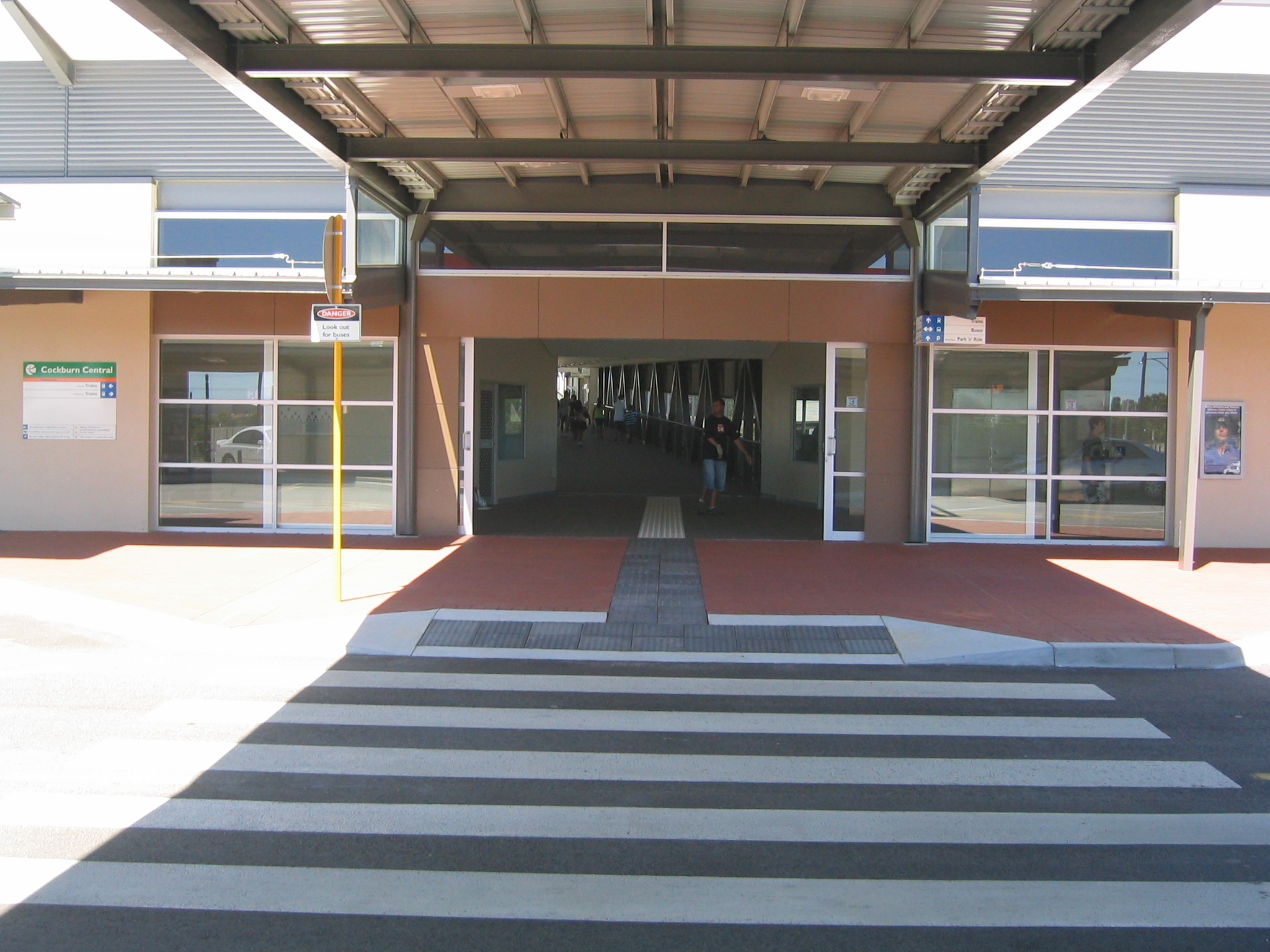
Station entrance in December 2007

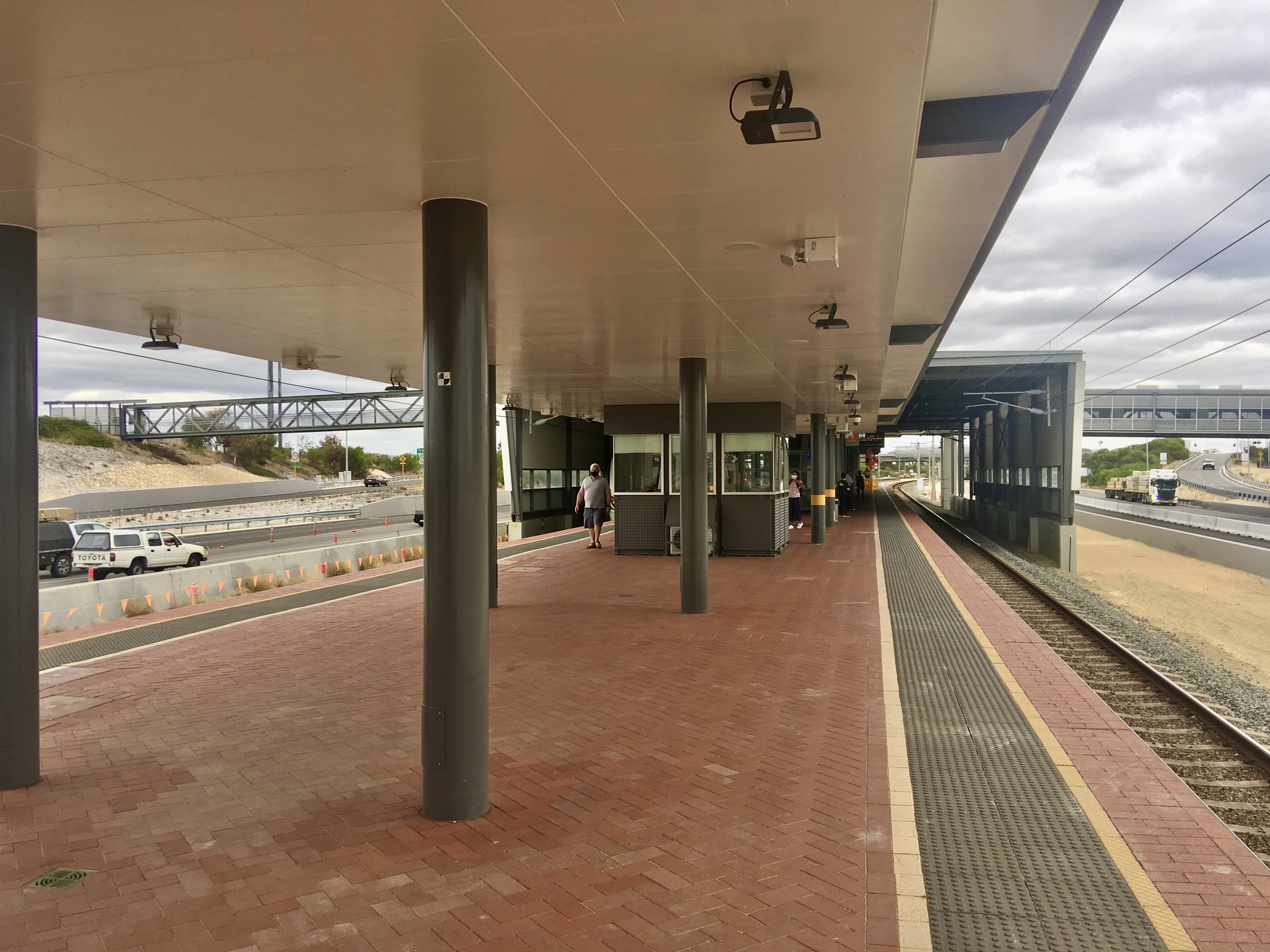
Platform level in April 2022

Cockburn Central station is served by the Mandurah and Thornlie-Cockburn lines and Transperth buses.

Cockburn Central station saw 1,575,735 passengers in the 2013–14 financial year.

== Platforms ==
Cockburn Central platform arrangement
Stop ID	Platform	Line	Stopping Pattern	Destination	Via	Notes
99661	1	Mandurah line	All stations, W	Perth Underground	Murdoch	
99662	2	Mandurah line	All stations	Mandurah		
99662	2	Mandurah line	W	Terminus		
99663	3	Thornlie-Cockburn line	All stations	Perth	Cannington	

Special events

Cockburn Central platform arrangement
Stop ID	Platform	Line	Destination	Via	Stopping Pattern	Notes
99661	1	Mandurah line	Perth Stadium	Thornlie	RE, ME	Express from Thornlie to Perth Stadium
99662	2	Mandurah line	Rockingham or Mandurah		RE, ME	
99663	3	Thornlie-Cockburn line	Perth	Cannington	TP	Express from Carlisle to Perth Stadium to Perth

== Bus routes ==
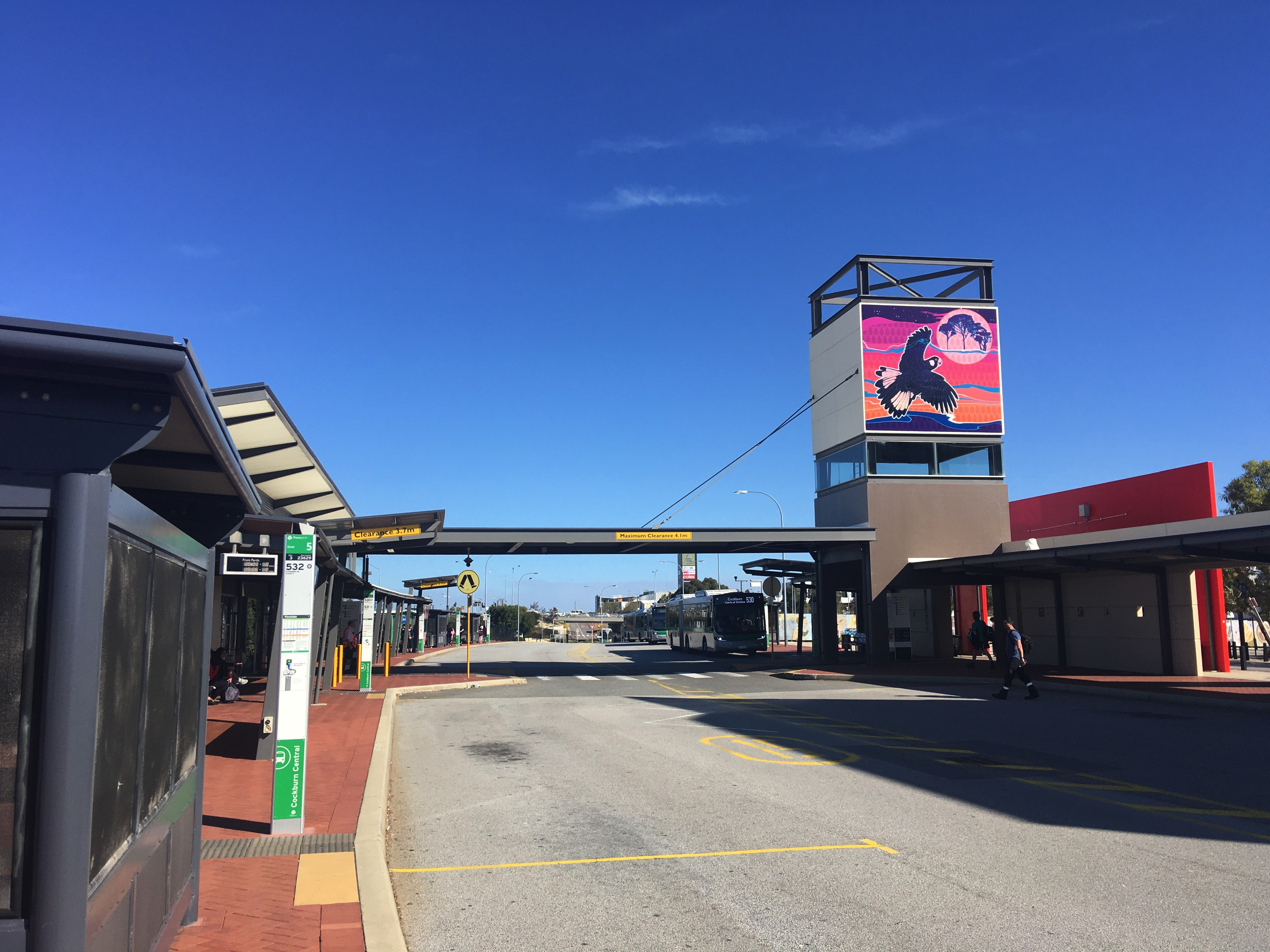
Cockburn Station bus interchange in October 2021

=== Stands 1–6 ===
Stop	Route	Destination / description	Notes
Stand 1	525	to Aubin Grove Station via Baningan Avenue	
Stand 1	526	to Aubin Grove Station via Wentworth Parade	
Stand 2	523	to Sapphire Drive, Treeby via Clementine Boulevard	
Stand 2	527	to Aubin Grove Station via Brenchley Drive, Atwell	
Stand 3	233	to Gosnells Station via Armadale Road, Nicholson Road, Gracefield Boulevard & Southern River Road	
Stand 3	518	to Murdoch station via Wright Road & Ranford Road	
Stand 4	530	to Fremantle station via Yangebup Road	
Stand 4	531	to Fremantle station via The Grange & Marvell Avenue	
Stand 5	532	to Fremantle station via Beeliar Drive, Hamilton Road & Clontarf Road	
Stand 6 – Set down	909	Rail replacement service to Mandurah station	
Stand 6 – Set down	689	to Crown Perth, Burswood	

=== Stands 7–12 ===
Stop	Route	Destination / description	Notes
Stand 7		South West Coach Lines services to Elizabeth Quay Bus Station & Perth Airport	
Stand 7		South West Coach Lines services to Bunbury, Busselton, Collie, Dunsborough & Manjimup & Margaret River	
Stand 7	103, 108, 317, 333, 334, 336	Transwa services to Perth Coach Terminal & Albany	
Stand 7		School Specials	
Stand 8	527	to Cockburn Gateway Shopping City	
Stand 8	515	to Murdoch station via Leeming & Leeming Senior High School (school days only)	
Stand 9	514	to Murdoch Station via Bibra Drive	
Stand 10	520	to Fremantle station via Adventure World	
Stand 11			
Stand 12 – Set down	909	Rail replacement service to Perth station	

== Public artwork ==
=== "Face of the Community" ===
Two billboard-sized artworks, titled "Face of the Community", were installed on the north and south faces of a tower at the station in 2006. The $40,000 artwork was created by artists Rodney Glick and Marco Marcon and featured the images of a young boy and a middle-aged woman who are not real people but a composite generated from over 250 photos of residents from the Cockburn area. Throughout the years the artworks (which were clearly visible from the Kwinana Freeway) received polarising opinions from the community, with some mistakenly believing the images to be that of missing persons, while Member for Cockburn Fran Logan called the artwork "weird, confusing and frankly a little creepy". The Public Transport Authority considered removing the artworks in 2015 after a rise in social media comments but following consultation with the council and a public survey, the artwork was retained. However the condition of the artworks deteriorated over time and in October 2019, the two images were removed due to safety concerns.

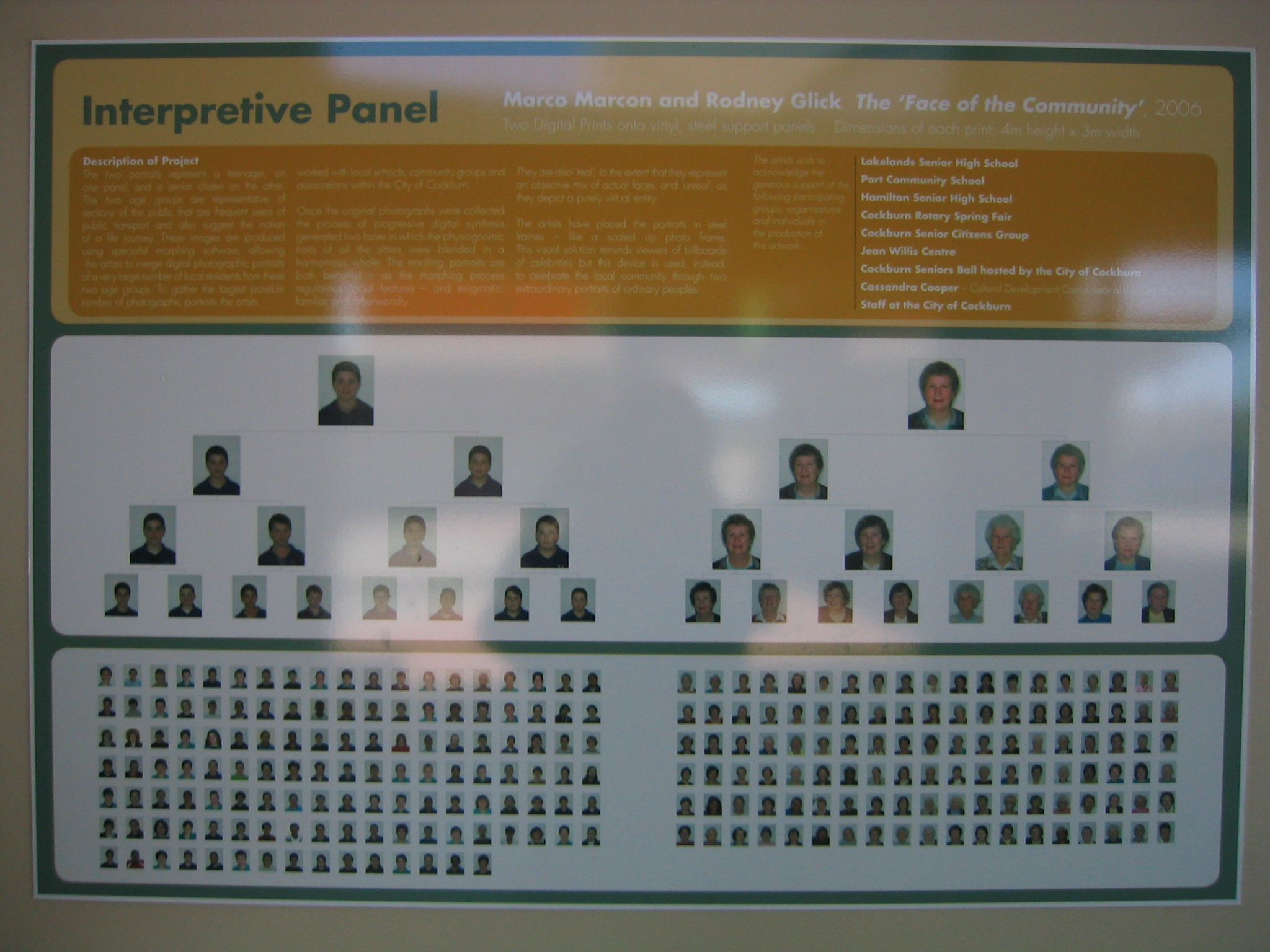

=== "Carnaby's Black Cockatoo" ===
In December 2019, the state government launched an online survey with members of the public asked to select what should replace the Face of the Community images from four choices: a new artwork, an analogue clock, digital advertising or restoring the original artworks. Only 8% of responses voted for the return of Face of the Community, with 43% opting for a new piece of artwork. A shortlist of three new artworks created by artists Penny Bovell and John Toohey, Kerise Delcoure, and Signs & Lines were revealed in December 2020, and an online survey was conducted to choose the new artwork. In January 2021, Delcoure's pieces, which features a portrayal of Carnaby's black cockatoos amongst salmon gums and banksia trees, was voted the most preferred artwork of the three shortlisted. It was installed on the north and south faces of the tower in August that year.

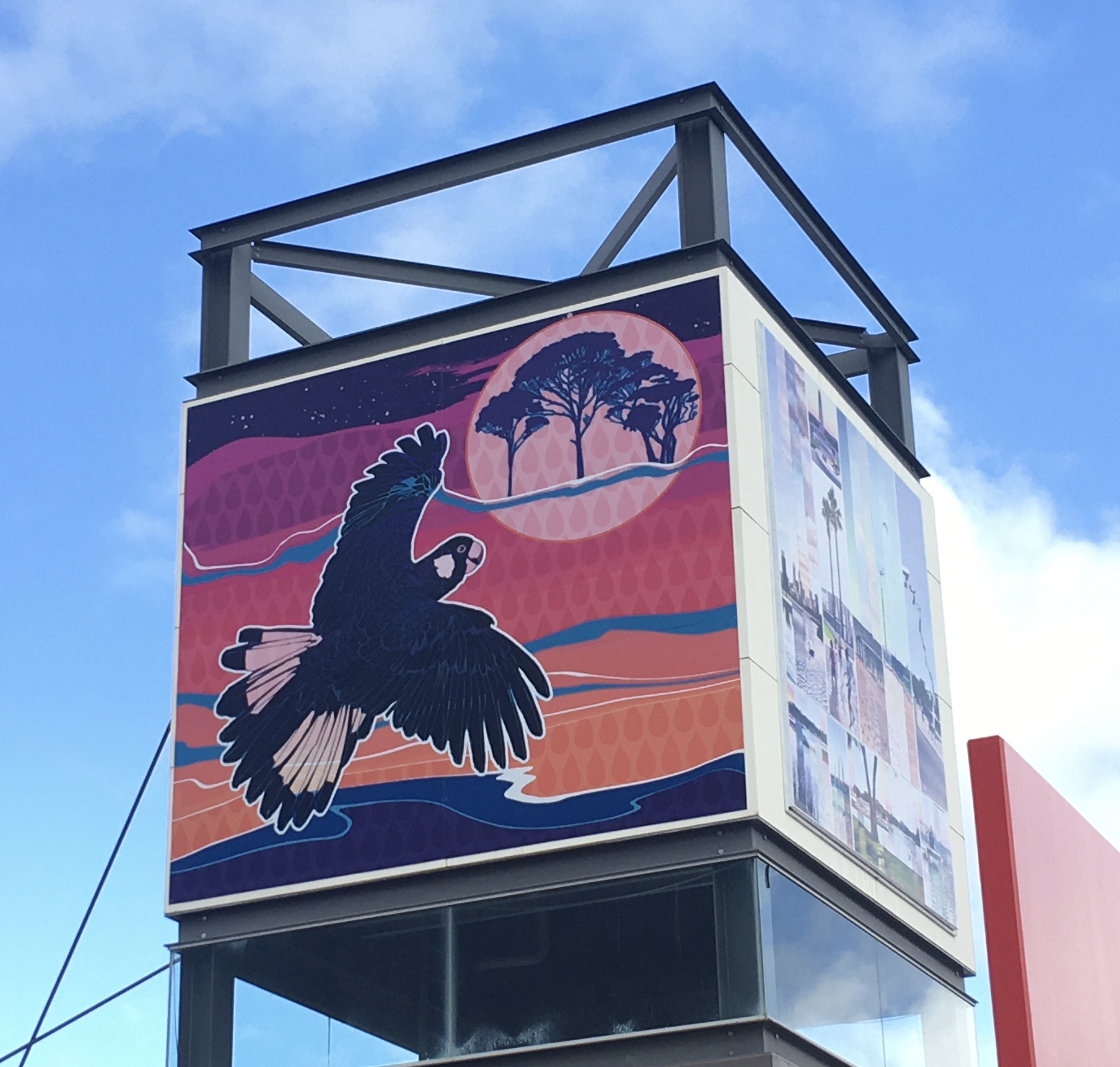

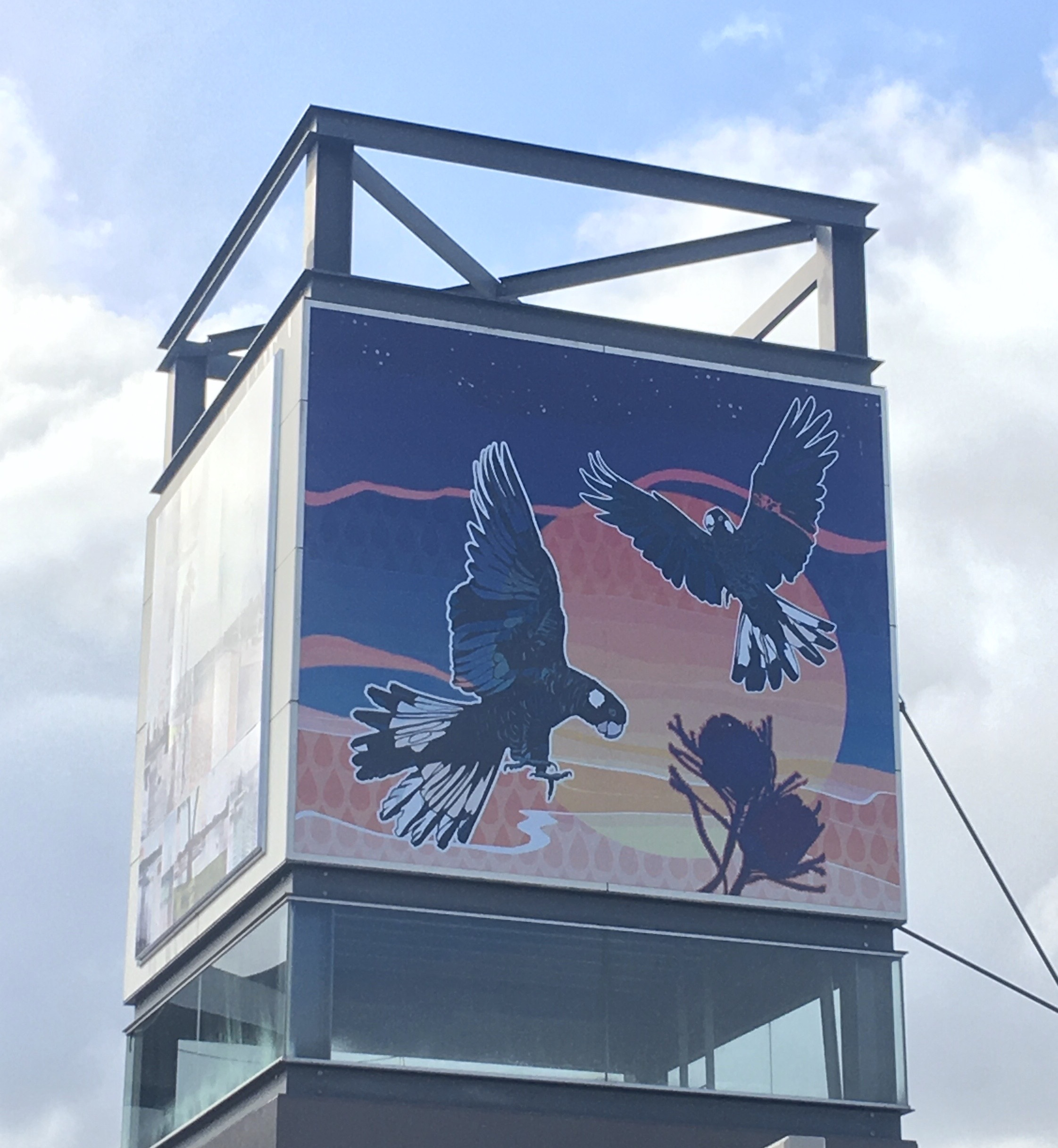

=== "Places of the Community" ===
On 23 June 2015, artwork by Perth artist Lyn Merrington was installed on the western face of the station's tower. Titled "Places of the Community", the $30,000 artwork featured painted images of the 10 most-loved locations in Cockburn and landmarks visited most often by local residents, as determined by an online survey. The original paintings were donated to local organisations.

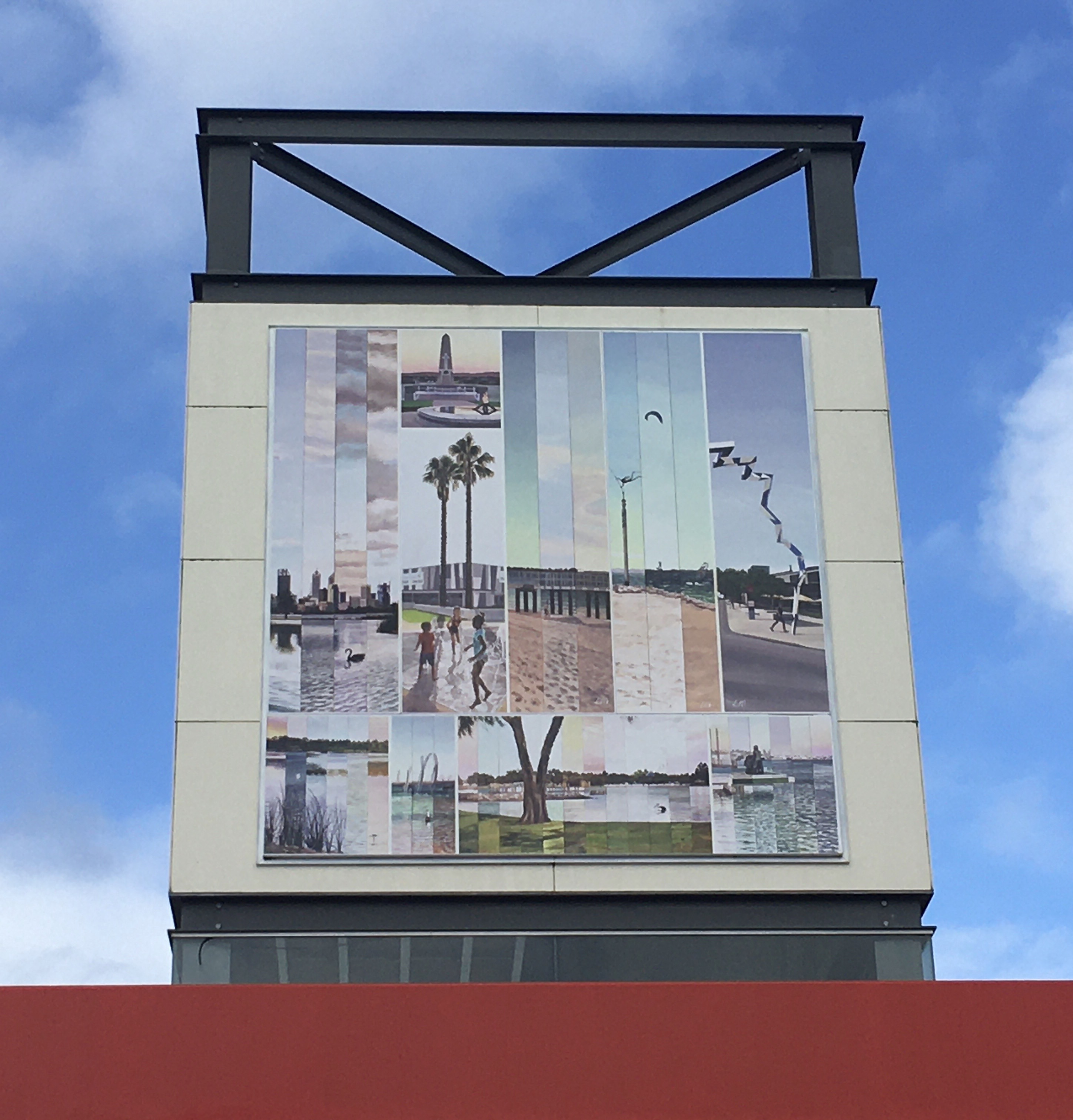
