= Aubin Grove, Western Australia =

Aubin Grove
- Suburb
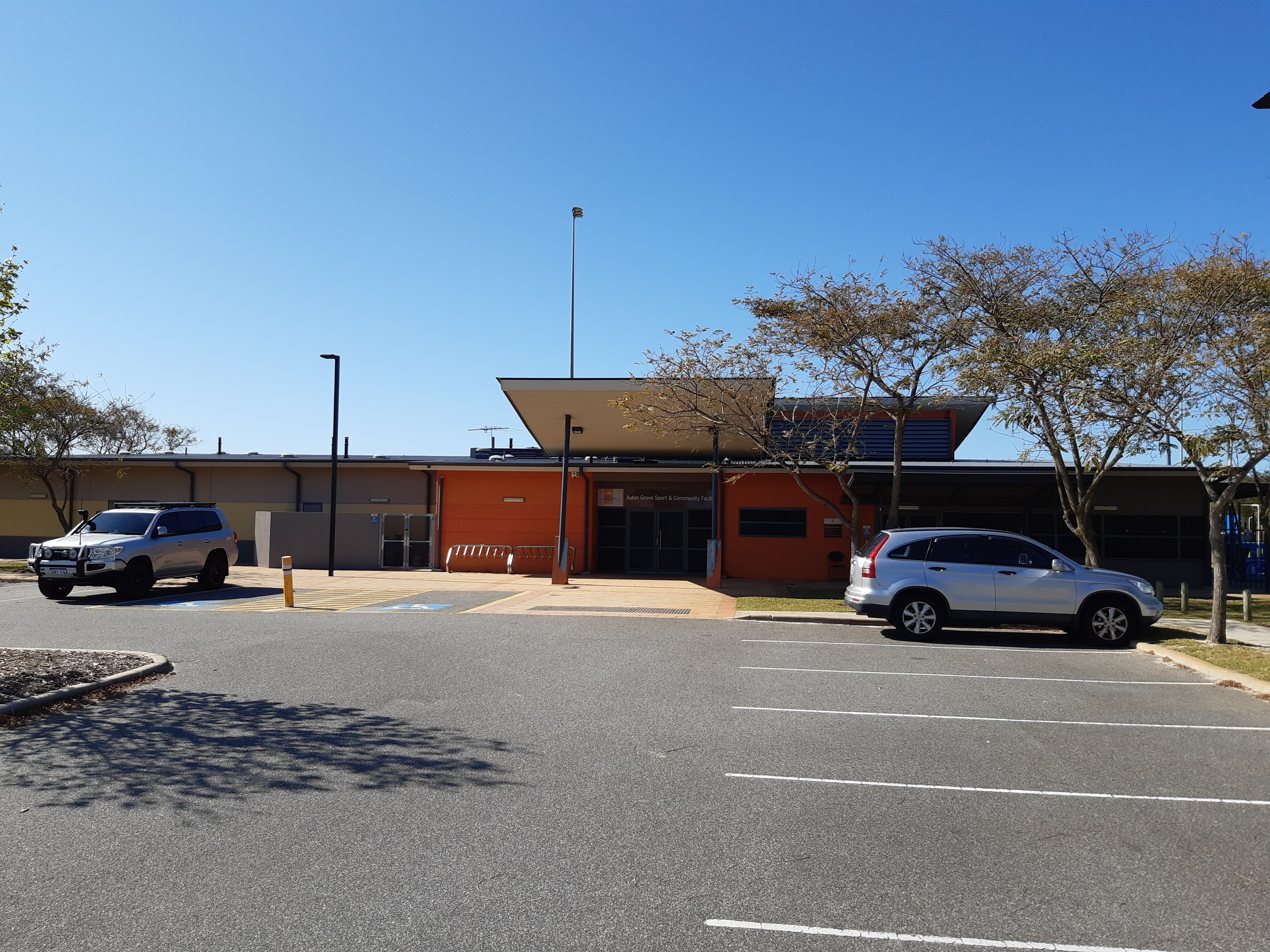
- Aubin Grove Sport and Community Facility
- Interactive map of Aubin Grove
- Coordinates: 32.169°S 115.864°E
- Country: Australia
- State: Western Australia
- City: Perth
- LGA: City of Cockburn
- Established: 2003

Government
  - State electorate: Oakford
  - Federal division: Fremantle

Area
  - Total: 2.5 km^{2} (0.97 sq mi)

Population
  - Total: 6,786 (SAL 2021)
- Postcode: 6164
Suburbs around Aubin Grove
Success	Atwell	Banjup
Hammond Park	Aubin Grove	Banjup
Wattleup	Banjup	Banjup

Aubin Grove is a suburb of Perth, Western Australia in the City of Cockburn. The suburb was approved in 2003.

The suburb has grown rapidly, from a population of 351 at the 2006 census to a population of 6,786, as per the 2021 census.

== History ==
Aubin Grove was formerly part of the rural locality of Banjup. It is named after Henry John Aubin, who leased agricultural land in the area in 1897. Aubin is said to have taken Lot 212, a lot which very closely resembles the current shape and size of Aubin Grove. His land bordered Lyon Road and Gibbs Road (as it does today), and also a shared boundary with James Hammond's plot to the west. His plot was converted into modern-day Hammond Park.

=== Important Roads ===
==== Lyon Road ====
This road serves as Aubin Grove's main road, with connections to important roads that connect Aubin Grove to the Kwinana Freeway. The road is named after John McMurray Lyon, who owned a plot in the area.

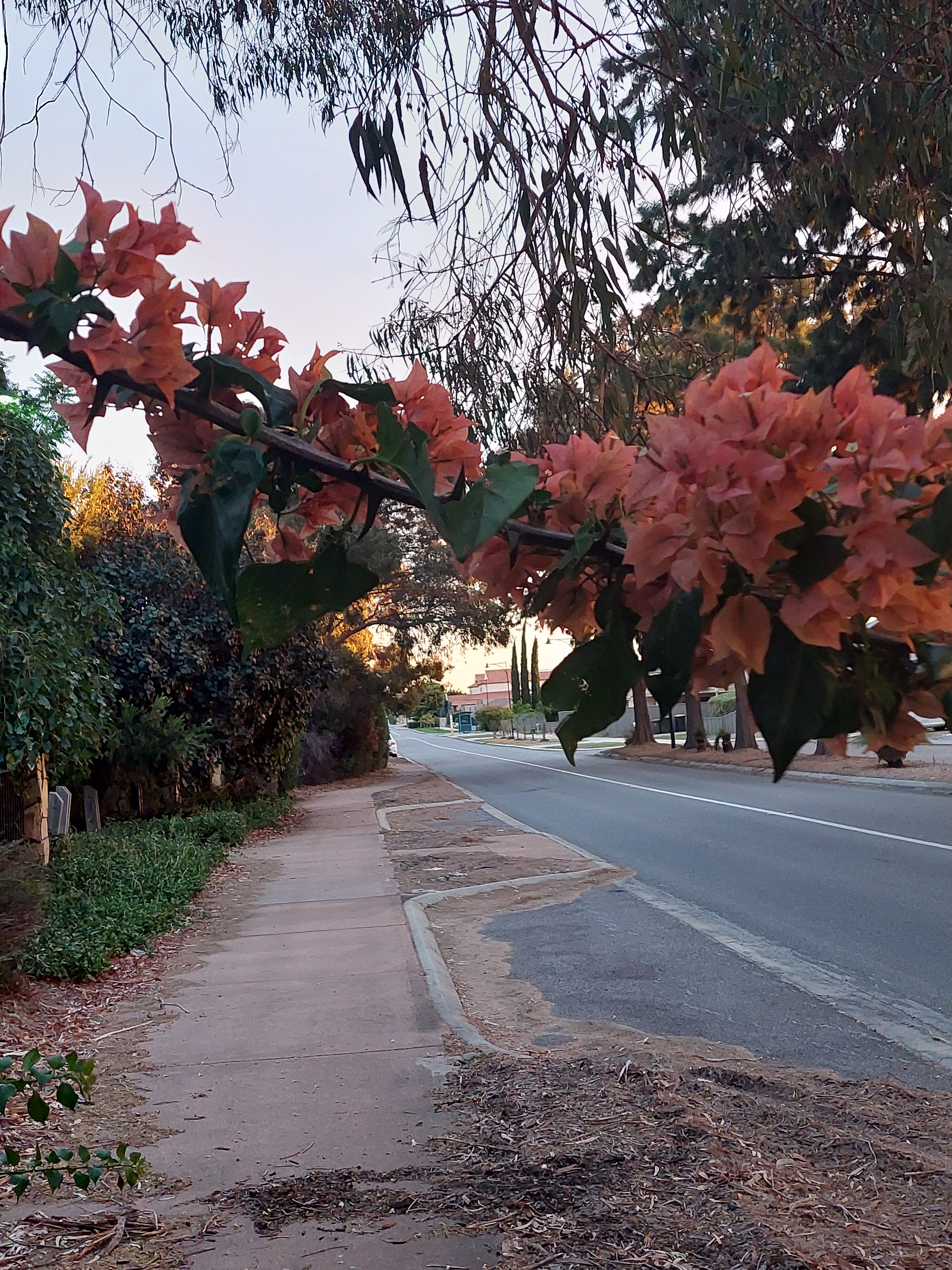
Flowers from a flowering tree adjacent to the footpath of Lyon Road.

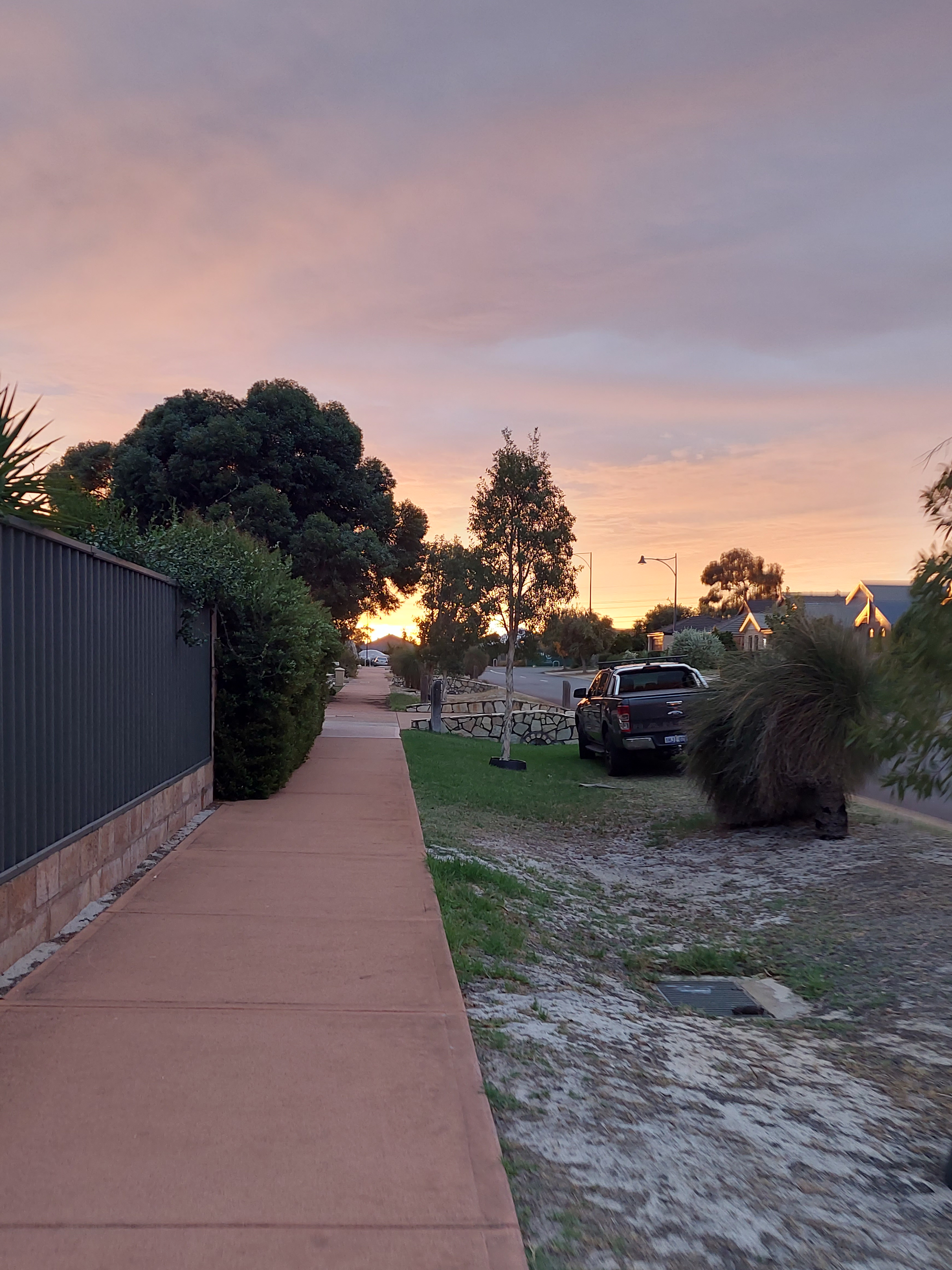
A street in Aubin Grove

===== Gaebler Road =====
Aubin Grove's second major road. It connects the suburb to neighbouring Banjup. The road is named after German migrant Waldemar Gaebler. He requested the development of the road as its continuation, Oxley Road, bordered his property.

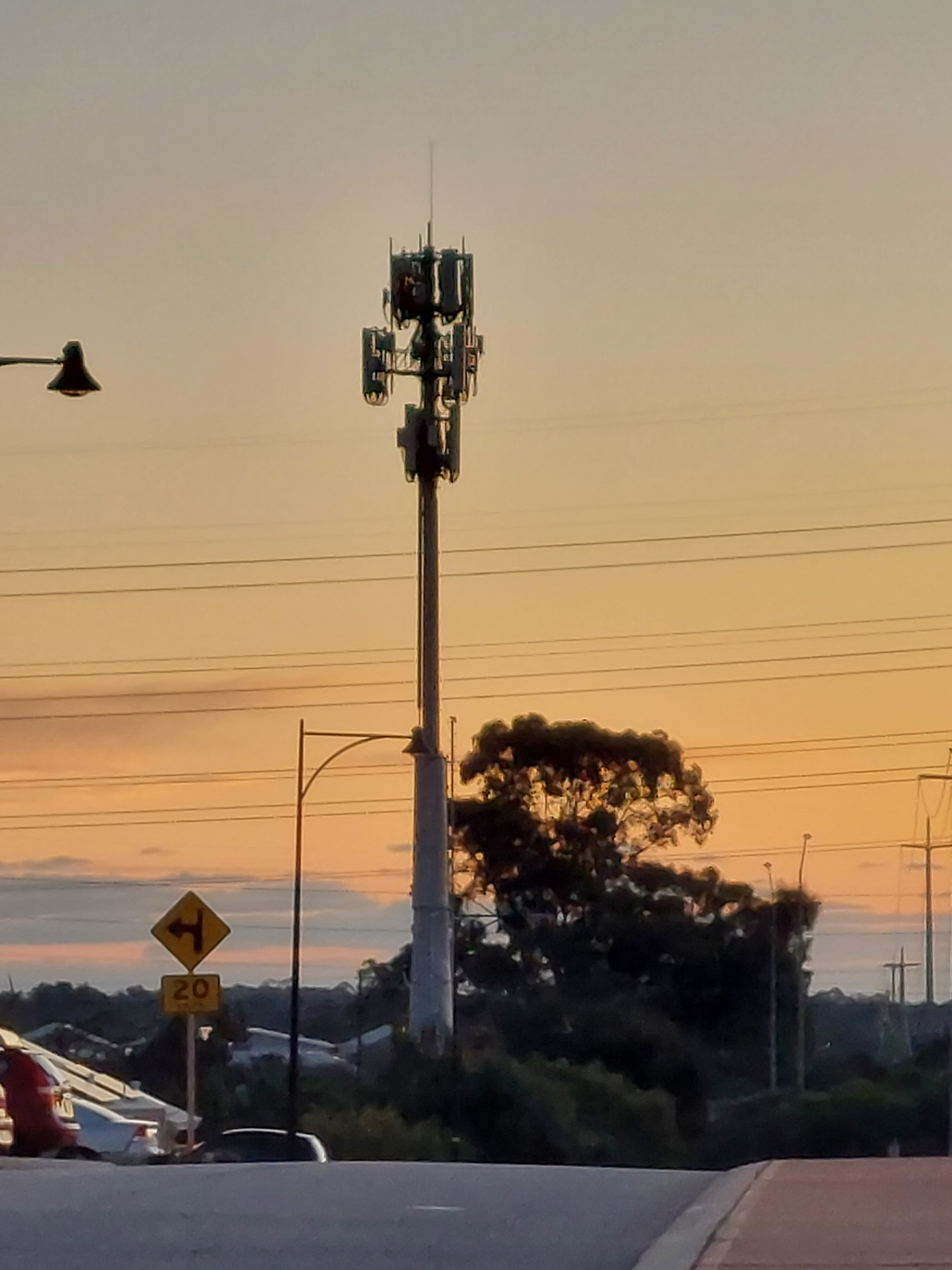
The Aubin Grove Cellular tower, contrasted by the striking orange sky. The tower is located in the westernmost-end of Gaebler Road, and is visible across the majority of the suburb.

== Geographical Location ==
Aubin Grove is located in the City of Cockburn's East Ward, and lies South of the Swan River.

It borders Atwell and Success to the North-East and North-West (respectively), Banjup and Hammond Park to the East and West (respectively), and Wandi to the South.

== Transport ==
Aubin Grove stays well-connected to the rest of Perth thanks to Transperth services operating in the area.

The Aubin Grove Railway Station, located in the neighbouring suburb Atwell, opened on 23 April 2017. The station lies on the Mandurah line, with trains heading towards Perth and Mandurah.

Transperth Bus Service no. 537 serves Aubin Grove and the neighbouring suburb Wandi, connecting residents to the railway station.

=== Bus ===
- 537 Aubin Grove Station to Wandi – serves Lyon Road
