= Hammond Park, Western Australia =

Hammond Park Perth, Western Australia
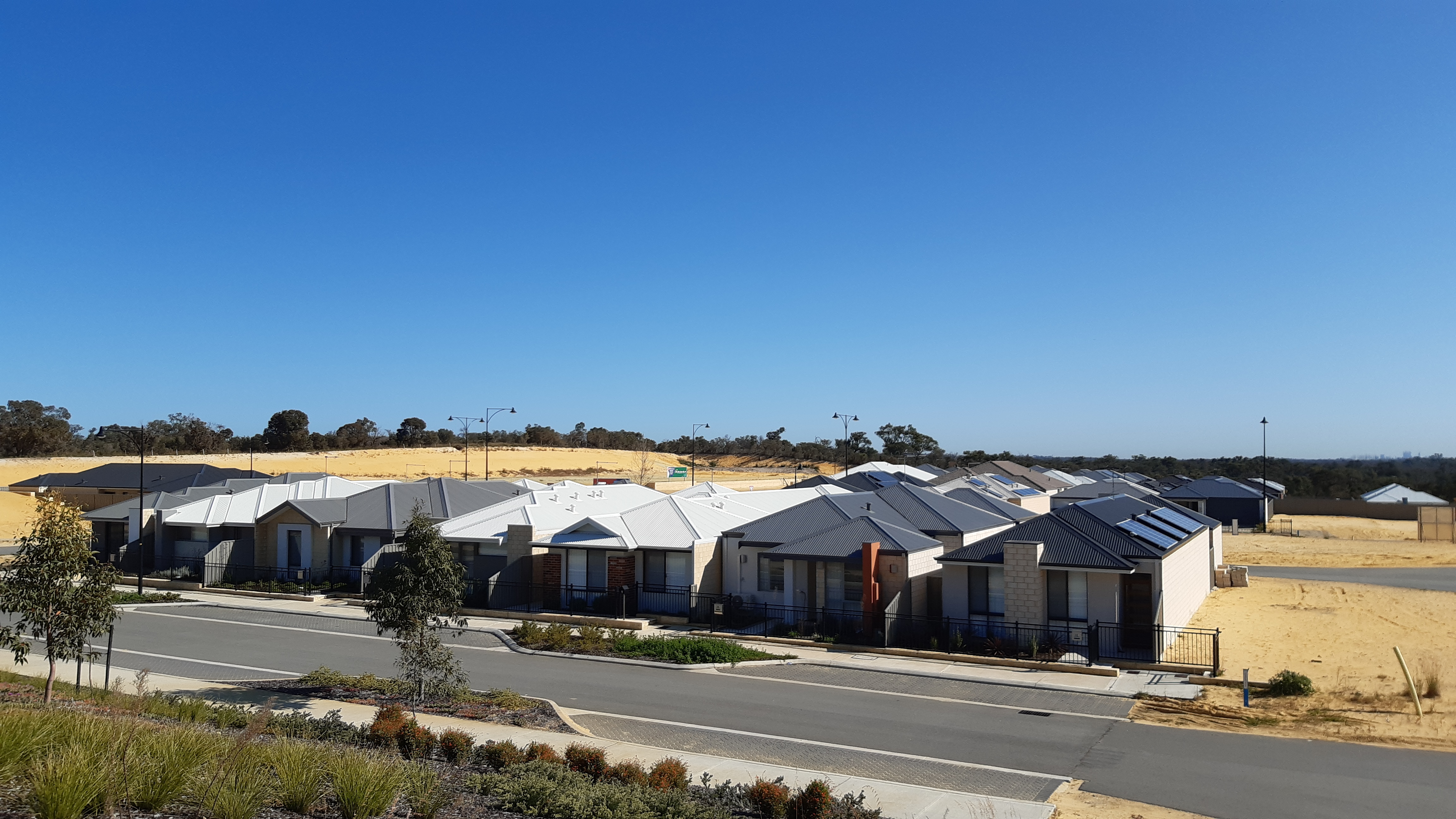
- New housing estate in Hammond Park, 2020
- Coordinates: 32.168°S 115.851°E
- Population: 6,985 (SAL 2021)
- Postcode(s): 6164
- Area: 4.3 km^{2} (1.7 sq mi)
- LGA(s): City of Cockburn
- State electorate(s): Cockburn
- Federal division(s): Fremantle
Suburbs around Hammond Park:
| Beeliar | Success | Atwell |
| Wattleup | Hammond Park | Aubin Grove |
| Wattleup | Wattleup | Banjup |

Hammond Park is a southern suburb of Perth, Western Australia, located within the City of Cockburn. Hammond Park was previously part of Banjup, and the suburb was created in March 2002. It was named after James Hammond, a pioneer of the Jandakot district who settled there in 1887.

== Education ==
The three primary schools in Hammond Park are Jilbup Primary School (established 2024), Hammond Park Primary School (established 2014) and Hammond Park Catholic Primary School (established 2013). The only secondary school in Hammond Park is Hammond Park Secondary College (established 2020). Hammond Park Secondary College has over 800 students in years 7 to 12.

== Sport ==
Hammond Park is home to the Hammond Park Junior Football Club, who now play at the newly completed Frankland Park Sports and Community Facility.

Construction of the multipurpose facility began in early 2021 and was completed in early 2022. Located on Frankland Avenue, the complex includes amenities for the Hammond Park Junior Football Club and Melville Braves Baseball Club. The facility features club and function rooms, food and beverage areas, toilets, change rooms, and shower facilities. External sporting infrastructure includes two fenced, bore-reticulated grass ovals with lighting for AFL use, a baseball batting cage, exercise equipment and a spectator viewing area. A carpark for 151 cars with have shade trees and lighting also services the venue.
