= Bellevue railway depot =

Transperth railway depot in Perth, Western Australia

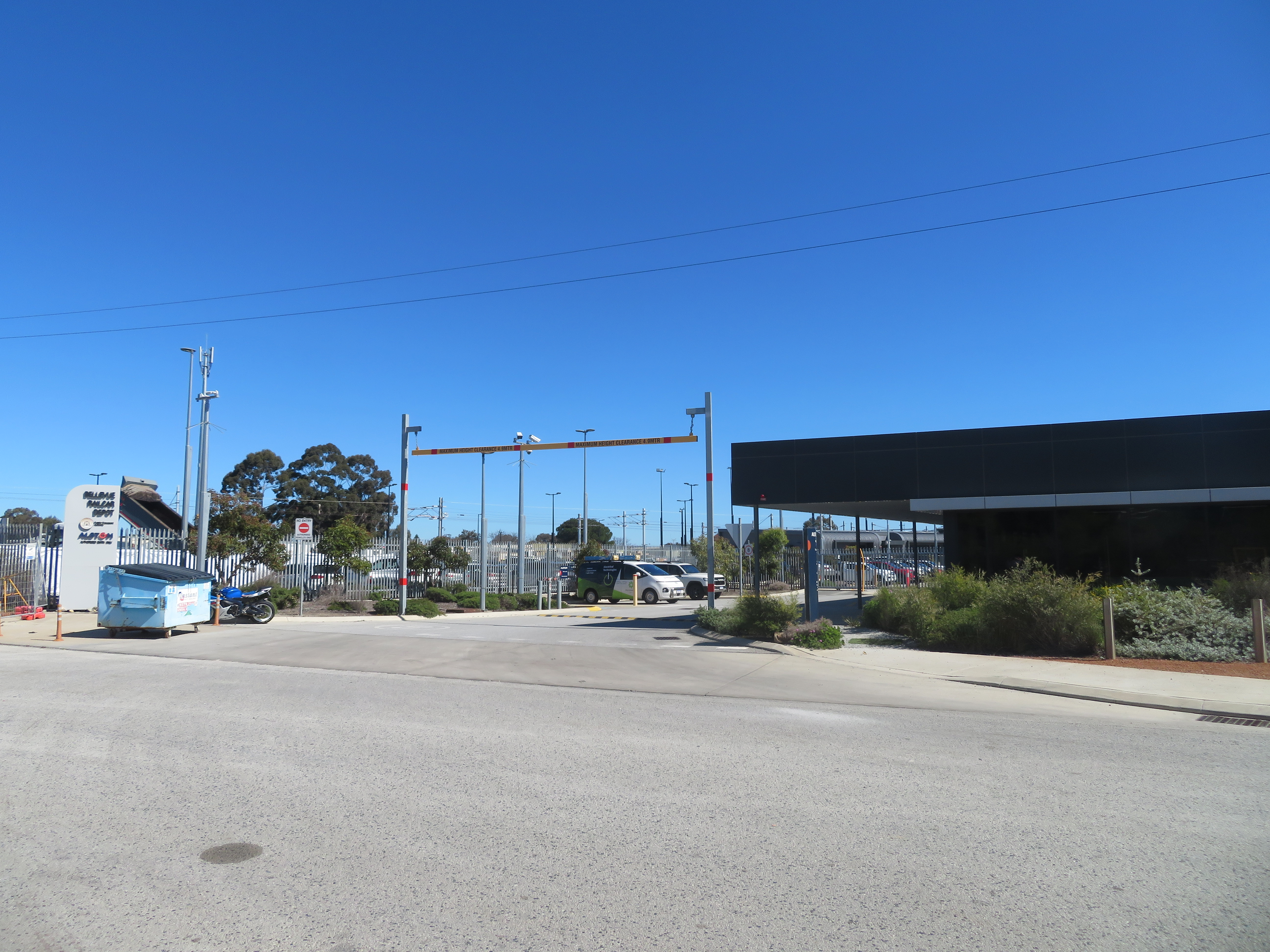
- Bellevue railway depot in 2026
- Interactive map of Bellevue railway depot

Location
- Location: Elgee Road, Bellevue
- Coordinates: 31.8959°S 116.01934°E

Characteristics
- Owner: Public Transport Authority
- Operator: Alstom Transport
- Rolling stock: Transperth B-series (future), Transperth C-series, Transwa ADR/ADS class
- Routes served: Airport, Ellenbrook, Fremantle, and Midland

Bellevue railway depot is a Transperth railcar production facility and future depot in the suburb of Bellevue, Western Australia. It is situated on Elgee Road between Lloyd Street and Roe Highway past the terminus of the Midland line.

== History ==
Bellevue railway depot is being constructed under the PTA's Metronet initiative as part of the WA Railcar Program and New Midland station projects. The Bellevue Railcar Assembly Facility portion of the depot completed construction in June 2021. The rest of the site will contain a railcar maintenance facility and stabling yard. The Bellevue railcar depot is anticipated to be opened following the completion of the New Midland Station project on 22 February 2026.

The construction of Bellevue railway depot is notable as with its railcar assembly facility, it has enabled the return of train manufacturing to Western Australia following the 1994 government closure of the Midland Railway Workshops.

== Function ==
The depot will be connected East of Midland station by 1.7 kilometres (1.1 mi) of dual line railway track parallel to the existing Arc Infrastructure rail alignment through Midland. Both narrow and standard gauge rail access is facilitated, allowing Transwa DMU railcars to be serviced and potentially stowed at Bellevue. For Transperth operations, the depot will likely serve the Airport, Ellenbrook, Fremantle, and Midland lines.

The depot and maintenance facility are intended to stow and service the Transperth B-series after they are gradually cascaded away from the Mandurah and Yanchep lines following the delivery of enough Transperth C-series railcars to operate those lines and begin retiring the ageing Transperth A-series railcars.

The Bellevue Railcar Assembly Facility is currently leased to Alstom Transport and is where the Transperth C-series railcar EMU sets are being produced alongside the new Australind railcar DMU ADR/ADS sets. The first of the Transperth C-series sets to enter public service was set 130 on 7 April 2024. As of 2021 43 six-car Transperth C-series trains will be assembled and tested by Alstom at this facility.
