= 85 class =

85 class or Class 85 may refer to:

- British Rail Class 85
- DRG Class 85
- New South Wales 85 class locomotive
