= Claisebrook =

Claisebrook is an area in the Central Business District of Perth, Western Australia, and may refer to:

- Claisebrook railway station
- Claisebrook railway depot
- Claise Brook, a watercourse which discharges into the Swan River at Claisebrook Cove
