= Westrail ADP/ADQ class =

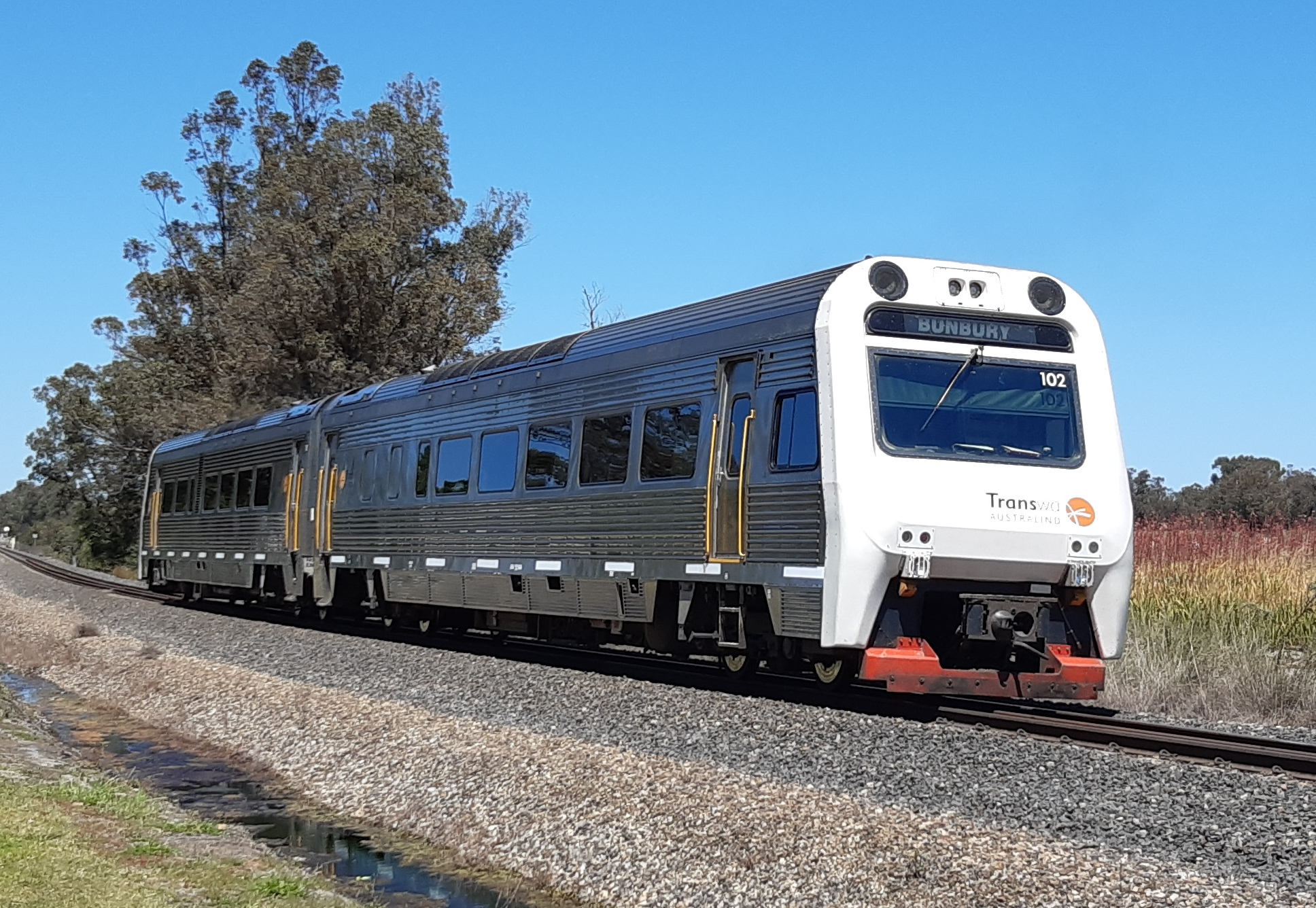
- ADP101 and ADP102 passing through Yarloop in October 2020

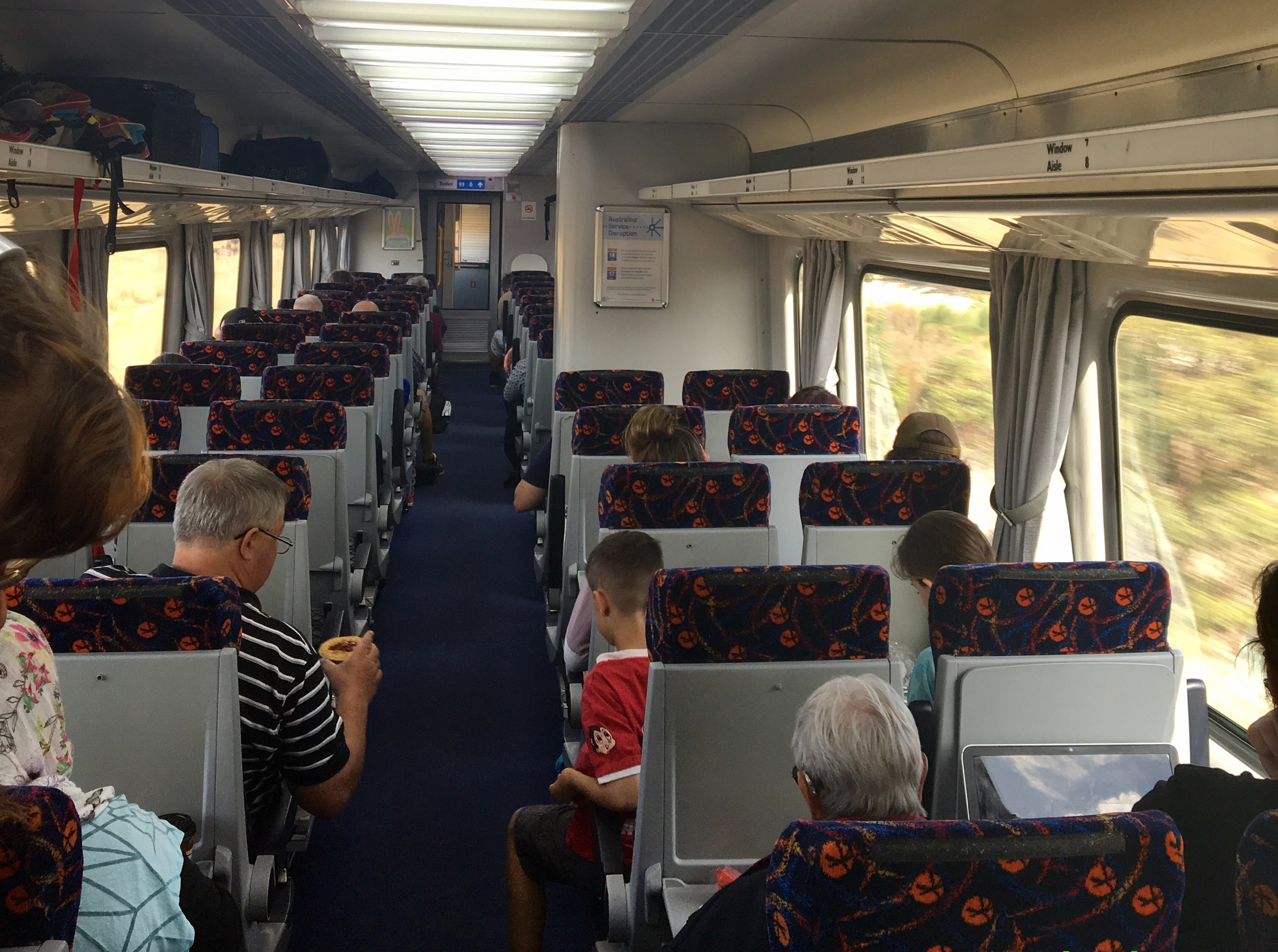
- Refurbished interior
- In service: 1987–2023
- Manufacturer: Comeng
- Built at: Bassendean
- Refurbished: 2003, 2007
- Number built: 5
- Successor: ADR/ADS class
- Formation: ADP–ADP; ADP–ADQ–ADP; ADP–ADQ–ADQ–ADP
- Fleet numbers: ADP101–103; ADQ121–122
- Capacity: ADP: 38 + 1 Wheelchair; ADQ: 58
- Operators: Westrail (1987–2000); WAGR Commission (2000–2003); Transwa (2003–2023)
- Depot: Claisebrook railway depot
- Line served: South Western

Specifications
- Train length: 2-car: 42.32 m (138 ft 10 in); 3-car: 63.48 m (208 ft 3 in); 4-car: 86.64 m (284 ft 3 in)
- Car length: 21.16 m (69 ft 5 in)
- Width: 2.88 m (9 ft 5 in)
- Height: 4,115 mm (13 ft 6.0 in)
- Floor height: 1,185–1,200 mm (3 ft 10.7 in – 3 ft 11.2 in)
- Doors: 2 per side
- Wheel diameter: 840 mm (33 in)
- Wheelbase: 2.5 m (8 ft 2 in)
- Maximum speed: 120 km/h (75 mph) (design); 110 km/h (68 mph) (service)
- Weight: ADP: 48.45 t (47.68 long tons; 53.41 short tons); ADQ: 47.8 t (47.0 long tons; 52.7 short tons)
- Prime mover: Cummins KTA 19 R @ 350 kW (470 hp)
- Power output: 373 kW (500 hp) @ 2100rpm per engine
- Transmission: Voith T 311r w/ KB 260 HD (Hydrodynamic braking disconnected)
- Power supply: Primary Batteries Type: Lead Acid HD Marine; Alternator Voltage: 415 V 50 Hz 3-phase AC +/- 10%
- HVAC: Sigma/MR27-MR1 A (1 per car)
- Bogies: Fabricated
- Braking systems: Davies & Netcalf/EBC5 w/ Oerlikon WSP air-actuated disc brakes
- Safety system: ATP
- Coupling system: Scharfenberg
- Track gauge: 1,067 mm (3 ft 6 in)

The Westrail ADP/ADQ class is a retired class of railcars built by Comeng, Bassendean for Westrail in 1987 to operate the Australind service between Perth and Bunbury. Operation and ownership of the fleet was transferred to Transwa when Westrail was superseded by Transwa in 2003.

== History ==
In August 1985, Westrail awarded Comeng, Bassendean a contract for five diesel railcars, three ADP cars with driving cabs and two ADQ non-driving cars, using a similar body shell and interior fitout to the New South Wales XPT carriages. Each car was powered by a Cummins KTA19 engine coupled to a Voith transmission. They usually operate as a four car set.

In July 2003, the railcars were painted in a new livery in line with the formation of Transwa. In 2007, the railcars were painted white as part of a refurbishment program. In 2010–2011 new seats were fitted.

The railcars were all retired in November 2023 upon the commencement of the Victoria Park-Canning Level Crossing Removal Project and Byford Rail Extension, which suspended the Australind service until June 2026. They were succeeded by ADR/ADS class trains, diesel-powered variants of the Transperth C-series trains.

One railcar has been donated to Rail Heritage WA, and it is planned to be moved to their museum in Boyanup.
