= Transwa ADR/ADS class =

Class of Australian diesel multiple unit trains

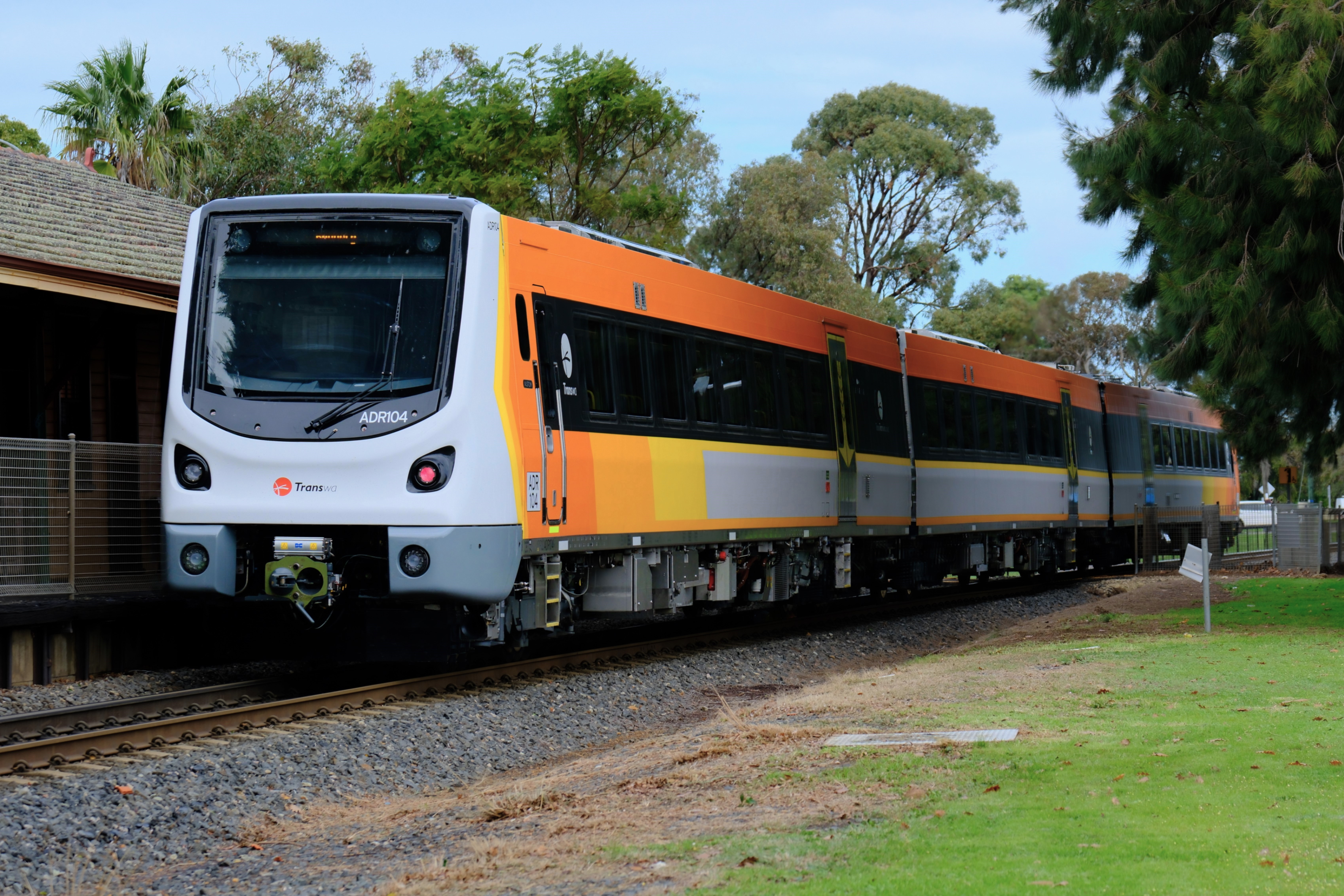
- Australind set 04 at Harvey station
- Stock type: Diesel-hydraulic multiple unit
- In service: 2026–present
- Manufacturer: Alstom
- Built at: Sri City, India and Bellevue, Western Australia
- Replaced: ADP/ADQ class
- Constructed: 2022–2025
- Entered service: 29 June 2026
- Number built: 12 carriages (4 sets)
- Number in service: 6 carriages (2 sets)
- Formation: ADR–ADS–ADR
- Fleet numbers: ADR101–104, 201–204; ADS301–304
- Capacity: ADR: 54; ADS: 36 + 2 wheelchair; Total: 144 + 2 wheelchair
- Operator: Transwa
- Depots: Claisebrook Railcar Depot, Bellevue Railway Depot, Picton Yard
- Line served: South Western Railway

Specifications
- Car body construction: Stainless steel
- Train length: 72.49 m (237 ft 10 in)
- Car length: ADR: 24,435 mm (80 ft 2.0 in); ADS: 23.62 m (77 ft 6 in)
- Width: 2.86 m (9 ft 5 in)
- Height: 3,878 mm (12 ft 8.7 in)
- Floor height: 1,205 mm (3 ft 11.4 in)
- Doors: 1 per side of car
- Wheel diameter: 850 mm (33 in)
- Wheelbase: 2,400 mm (7 ft 10 in)
- Maximum speed: 143 km/h (89 mph) (design); 130 km/h (81 mph) (service)
- Weight: ADR: 48.45 t (47.68 long tons; 53.41 short tons); ADS: 47.8 t (47.0 long tons; 52.7 short tons)
- Prime mover: Voith R2876T3-390 (MAN D2876LUE631) horizontal R6 diesel engine
- Power output: 390 kW (520 hp)
- Transmission: Hydrodynamic turbo transmission via cardan shaft
- Gearbox: Voith SK 485
- Power supply: Battery: 110 V DC; Alternator: 400 V 50 Hz 3-phase AC
- HVAC: 1 per car
- Bogies: Fabricated
- Braking systems: Electro pneumatic (friction) and hydrodynamic brakes
- Safety system: ATP
- Coupling system: Dellner
- Track gauge: 1,067 mm (3 ft 6 in)

The Transwa ADR/ADS class is a class of 3-car diesel multiple units built by Alstom in Bellevue, Western Australia for the Public Transport Authority to operate the Australind service between Perth and Bunbury.

== Design ==
Each set features an onboard buffet, improved accessibility over its predecessor, in-seat USB charging, LED lighting and 14 bicycle storage spaces.

Each new train will also feature unique Aboriginal artwork from a local Indigenous artist, giving each train a distinct identity.

== History ==
In December 2019, the Public Transport Authority signed a contract with Alstom to deliver 41 6-car C Series EMUs and two 3-car like-for-like replacements for the life-expired ADP/ADQ Class Australind railcars. In January 2025, the order was doubled to four 3-car DMUs.

The ADR/ADS railcars share similar features to the C Series EMUs, both cosmetically and electrically. They operate in semi-permanently coupled 3-car sets. Each car is powered by a Voith R2876T3-390 (MAN D2876LUE631) horizontal R6 diesel engine via a cardan shaft to a single axle.

The first railcar left the Alstom Manufacturing and Assembly Facility at Bellevue on 26 September 2025 and testing commenced at Cardup on 30 September 2025. High-speed testing between Mandurah and Rockingham was undertaken from November 2025. Testing on the Arc Infrastructure network commenced on 23 February 2026 with the first run to Bunbury on 4 March 2026.

A new orange livery was unveiled to the public on 27 March 2026. Names for the four railcars: Marley, Kwilena, Koombana and Linda, were revealed on 18 June 2026 following a public competition. The chosen names relate to the Bunbury region:

- Marley, named after a dingo that took up residence at Bunbury Port
- Kwilena, the Noongar word for dolphin
- Koombana, named after Koombana Bay, north of Bunbury
- Linda, the nickname for the Australind by local train enthusiasts

A community event to mark the resumption of the Australind service was held at Bunbury Terminal on 28 June 2026. The railcars commenced passenger service on 29 June 2026, beginning with one new railcar, Marley, being used on the route at launch with the rest coming online in the following months.
