= Commonwealth Railways carbon steel carriage stock =

Passenger cars of the Commonwealth Railways

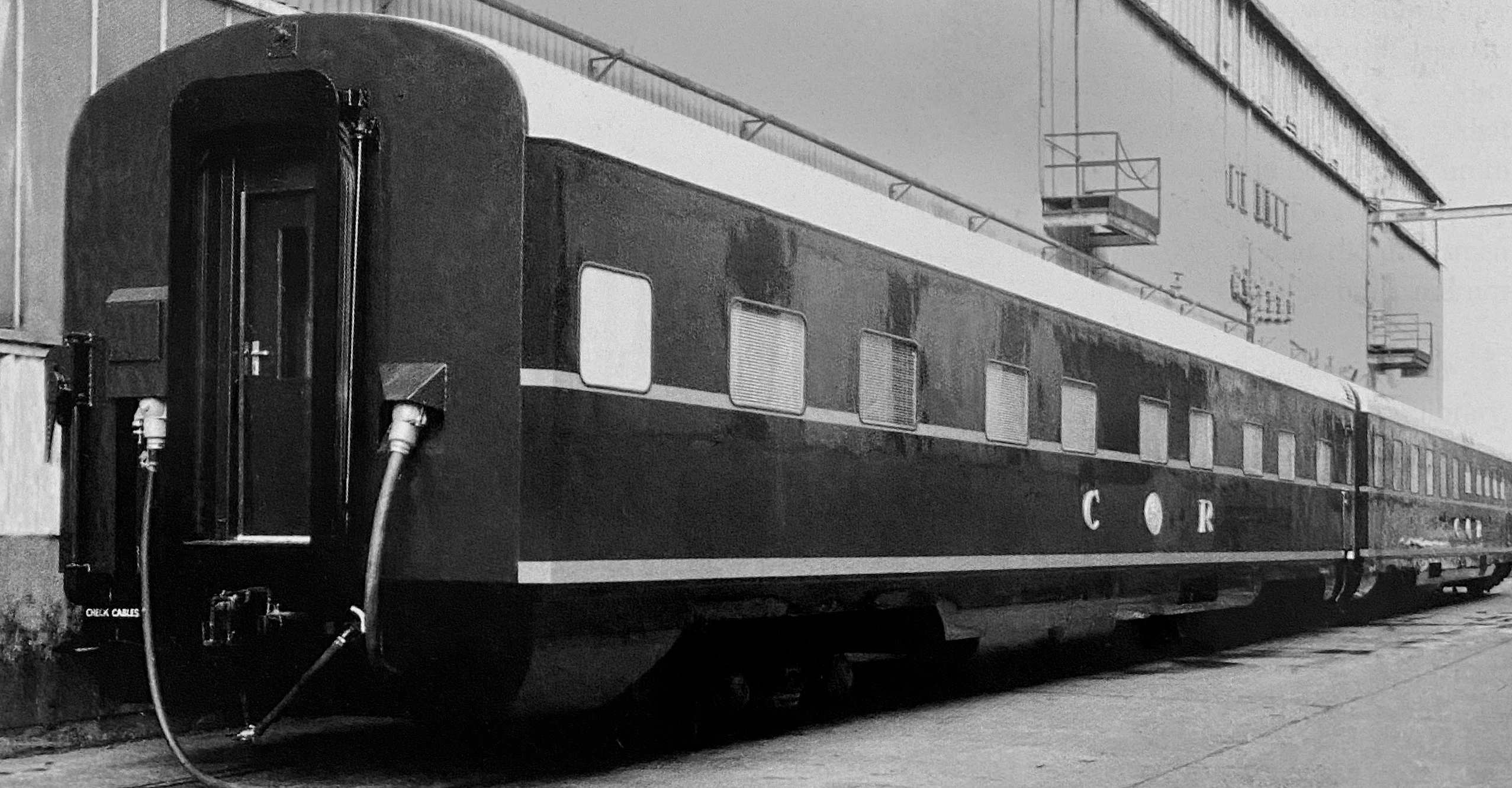
A carbon steel sleeping car, just completed, at the Comeng factory in 1964

In January 1963 Commonwealth Railways placed an order with Commonwealth Engineering, Granville for 24 air-conditioned carbon steel carriages.

These standard-gauge carriages were purchased for use on the Trans-Australian Railway between Port Pirie and Kalgoorlie, and on The Ghan from Port Pirie to Marree.

At 22.92 metres (75 ft 2 in), they were the longest passenger cars in Australia. They were Commonwealth Railways' first Australian-built standard-gauge carriages, their predecessors having been manufactured in Europe or Japan.

In July 1975, all were included in the transfer of Commonwealth Railways assets to the Australian National Railways Commission.

Subsequently, some were converted to crew cars for use on Trans-Australian Railway freight trains; others were sold to the Australian Rail Track Corporation; still others were scrapped.
