= WAGR B class (diesel) =

Class of Australian diesel-hydraulic locomotives

Western Australian Government Railways B class
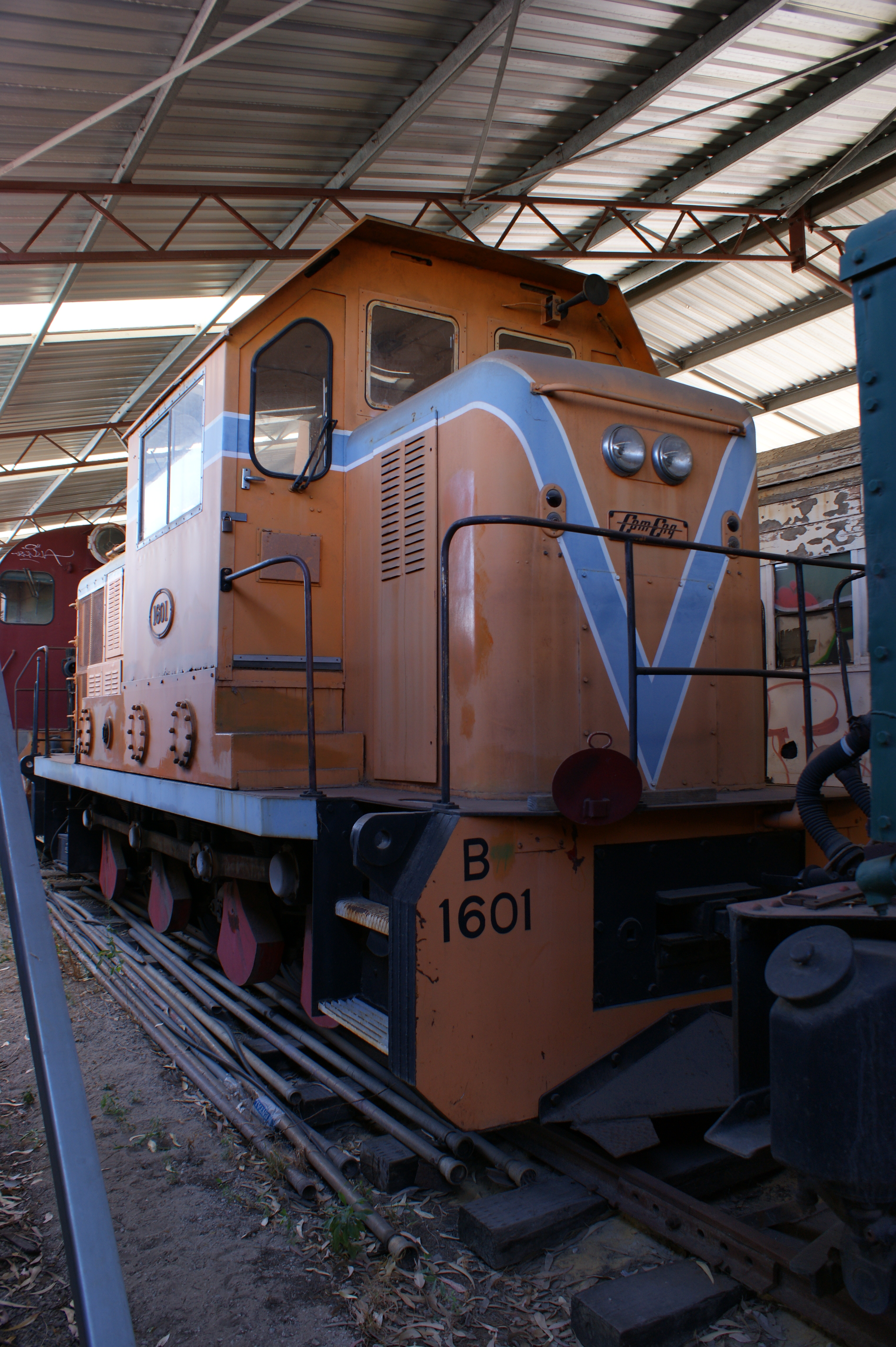
- B1601 at the Western Australian Rail Transport Museum
Type and origin
- Power type: Diesel-hydraulic
- Builder: Commonwealth Engineering
- Build date: 1962-1965
- Total produced: 10
Specifications
- Configuration
  - AAR: 0-6-0
  - UIC: C
- Gauge: 1,067 mm (3 ft 6 in)
- Loco weight: 39.2 long tons (39.8 t; 43.9 short tons)
- Fuel type: Diesel
- Fuel capacity: 340 imp gal (1,500 L; 410 US gal)
- Prime mover: Cummins VT-12-BI
- Engine type: Four-stroke V12 diesel
- Aspiration: Turbocharged
- Cylinders: 12
- Transmission: Twin Disc CF11,500 series MS450 hydraulic torque converter Wiseman 15 RLGB/H final drive
Performance figures
- Maximum speed: 26 mph (42 km/h)
- Power output: 473 hp (350 kW)
- Tractive effort: 23,000 lb_{f} (100 kN) (starting); 18,000 lb_{f} (80 kN) (continuous)
Career
- Operators: Western Australian Government Railways
- Number in class: 10
- Numbers: B1601-B1610
- First run: 21 March 1962
- Last run: 28 September 1984
- Disposition: 2 preserved, 2 unknown, 6 scrapped

The B class were a class of diesel locomotives built by Commonwealth Engineering for the Western Australian Government Railways between 1962 and 1965.

== History ==
The first five B class units entered service in 1962. Three years later, a second batch of five was delivered.

The second batch differed from the first only in having sloping cab sides, to enable the second batch to pass underneath the limited clearance cranes on the Fremantle wharves.

All members of the class spent the whole of their working lives in the Perth metropolitan area, and were written off as a group in September 1984. Some of them have since been preserved.

== Status Table ==
Key:	Preserved	Scrapped	Unknown

Serial Number	Date Built	Original Number	Previous Owner/s	Current/Last Owner	Status
		B1601	WAGR/Westrail	Rail Heritage WA	Preserved
		B1602		Westrail	Scrapped
		B1603	WAGR/Westrail, Station St Markets	Midland Military Markets	Last seen Kewdale, all evidence points to scrapped.
		B1604		Westrail	Scrapped
		B1605		Westrail	Scrapped
		B1606		Westrail	Scrapped
		B1607		Westrail	Scrapped
		B1608	WAGR/Westrail	Private Owner	Burnt in property fire, all evidence points to scrapped.
		B1609		Westrail	Scrapped
		B1610	WAGR/Westrail, Boulder Loop Line	Rail Heritage WA	Preserved
