= Commonwealth Engineering =

Former Australian manufacturer of railway rolling stock

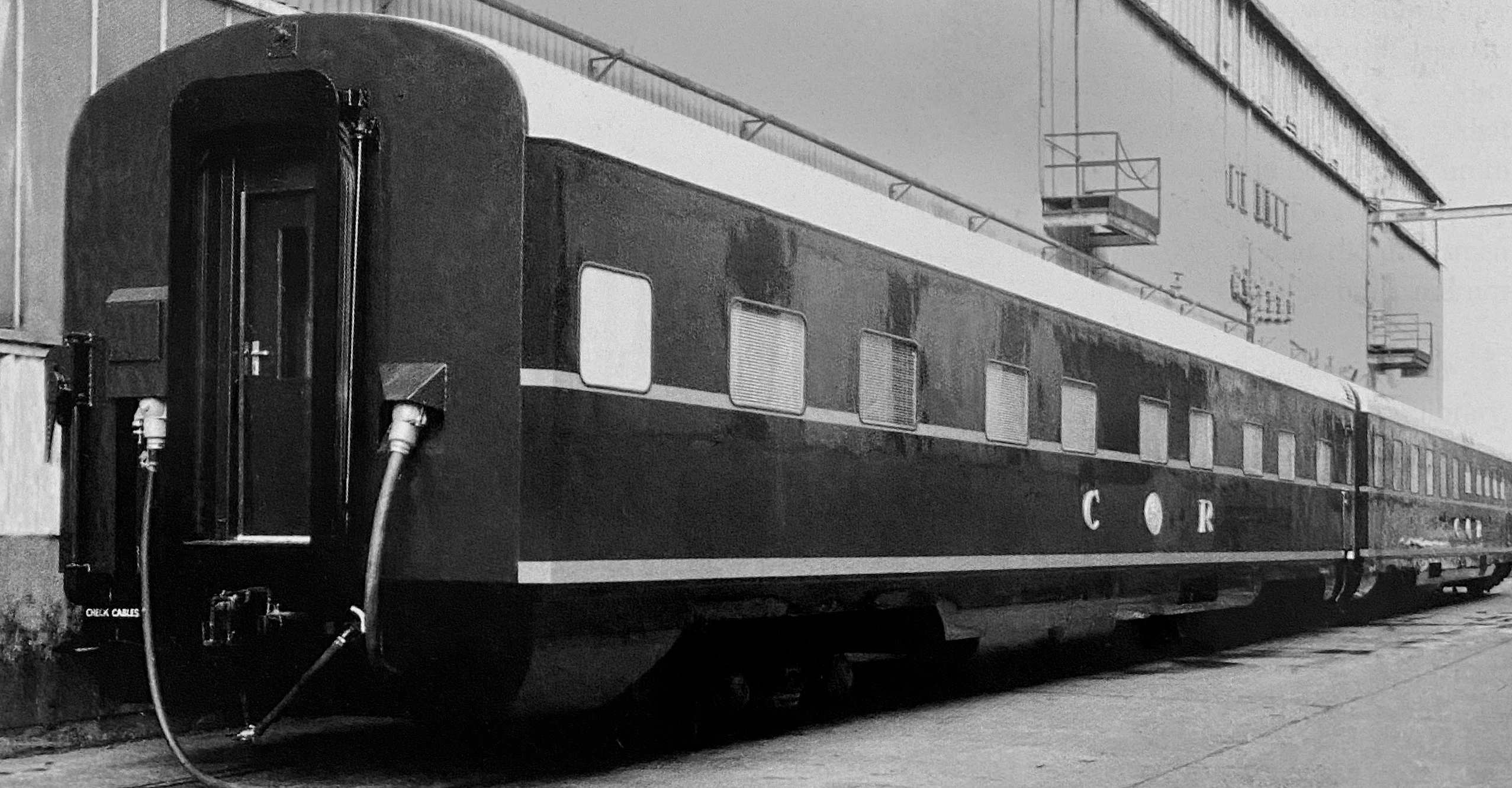
- Commonwealth Railways carbon steel sleeper cars at the Comeng Granville workshops
- Industry: Engineering
- Founded: 1921
- Defunct: 1990
- Fate: Acquired by ABB Transportation
- Headquarters: Granville
- Number of locations: Dandenong; Rocklea; Bassendean; Braemar
- Products: Railway rolling stock
- Parent: Australian National Industries

Commonwealth Engineering, often shortened to Com-Eng, later known as Comeng [/ˈkɒmɛndʒ/ KOM-enj], was an Australian engineering company that designed and built railway locomotives, rolling stock and trams.

== History ==
Smith and Waddington, the predecessor to Commonwealth Engineering, was founded in 1921, in the Sydney suburb of Camperdown, as a body builder for custom motor cars. It went bankrupt in the Great Depression, and was reformed as Waddingtons Body Works and the main factory was moved to Granville, after a fire in the main workshop. The Government of Australia took control of the company during World War II as the company was in serious financial difficulties but had many government orders in its books. The government purchased a controlling stake in the company in 1946 and changed the name to Commonwealth Engineering.

In 1949 a factory was established in Rocklea, Queensland. This was followed in 1952 by a plant in Bassendean, Western Australia and in 1954 by another in Dandenong, Victoria. Another factory was established in Braemar, NSW in 1973, as Mittagong Engineering. This was established not only to take some of the workload off the Granville plant but to potentially replace it.

In June 1957, the government sold its shares. In November 1982 Comeng was taken over by Australian National Industries.

The Granville factory closed in 1989 and has been demolished. The site, which was situated between the Great Western Highway and Main Western railway line west of Duck River, has been replaced with new developments including high-rise housing and light industries.

In 1990, the Dandenong plant was sold to ABB (later Bombardier Transportation, now Alstom), while the Bassendean facility was sold to A Goninan & Co.

== Buses ==
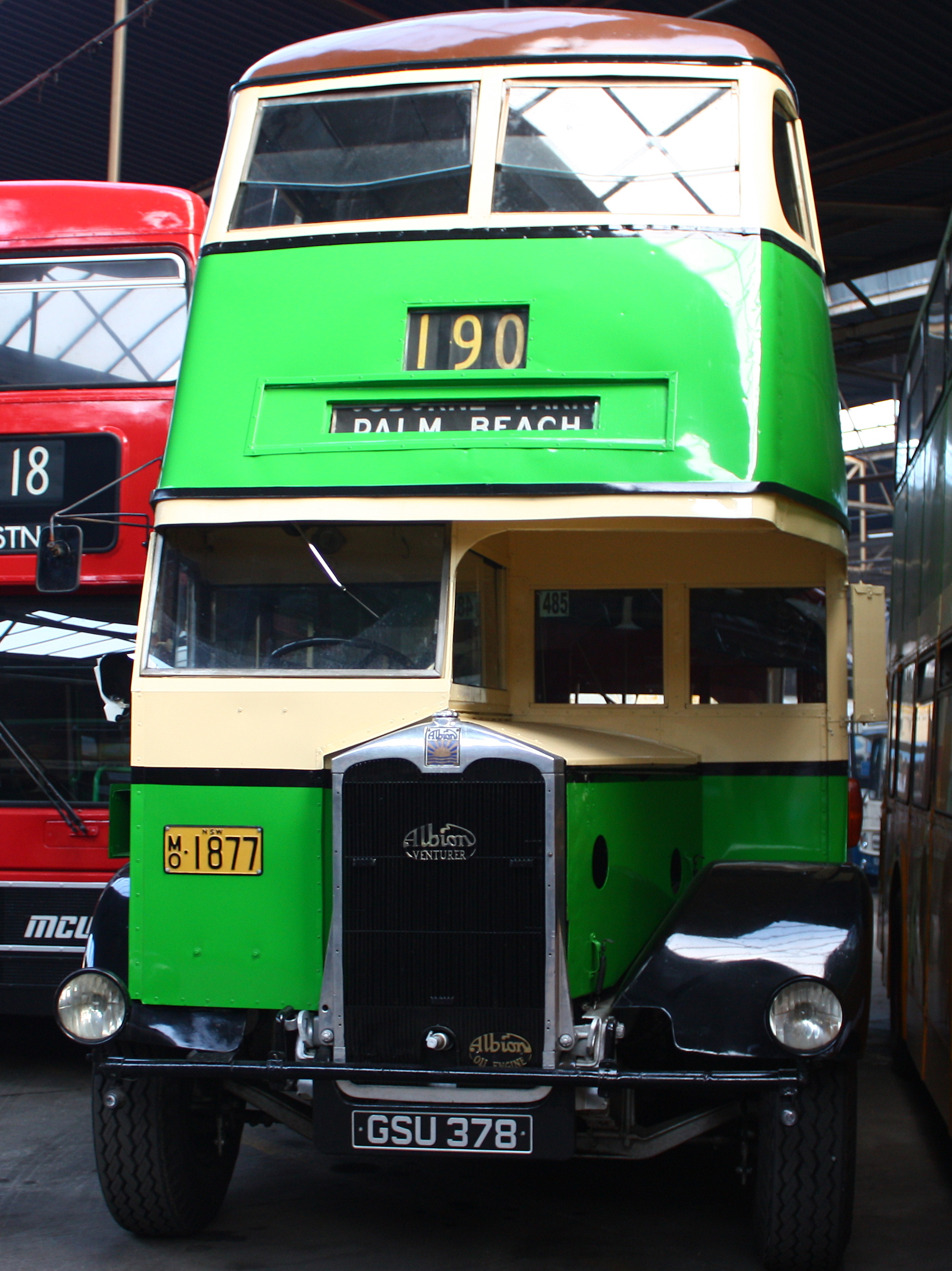
Preserved former Sydney Albion Venturer in Glasgow in October 2009

=== Australian Capital Territory ===
- 60 Canberra Bus Service AEC Reliance 470s
- 30 Canberra Bus Service AEC Swift 505s

=== New South Wales ===
- 50 Leyland OPSU1/1s
- 50 AEC Regal IVs

=== Victoria ===
- 50 AEC Regal IIIs

=== Western Australia ===
Leyland OPSU1/1s

== Diesel locomotives ==
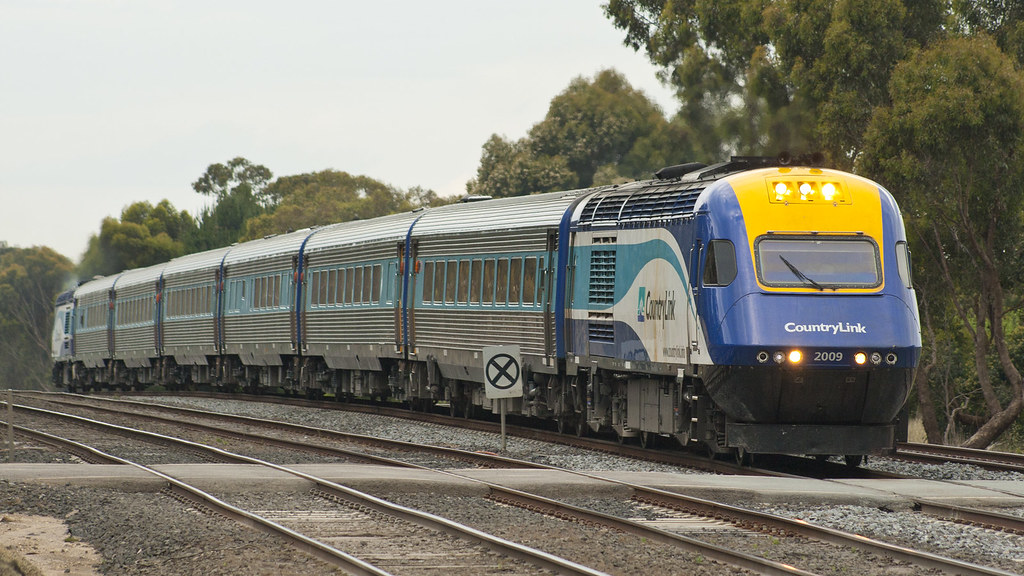
New South Wales XPT XP2009 at Tallarook in November 2011.

=== New South Wales ===
- 8 BHP Port Kembla D1 class diesel locomotives
- 6 442 class diesel locomotives
- 10 70 class diesel hydraulic locomotives
- 50 80 class diesel electric locomotives
- 15 XPT power cars

=== Queensland ===
- 1 Mount Isa Mines 302 class diesel-hydraulic locomotive
- 1 Mount Isa Mines 305 class diesel-hydraulic locomotive
- 7 DL class locomotives for Innisfail Tramway operations

=== Western Australia ===
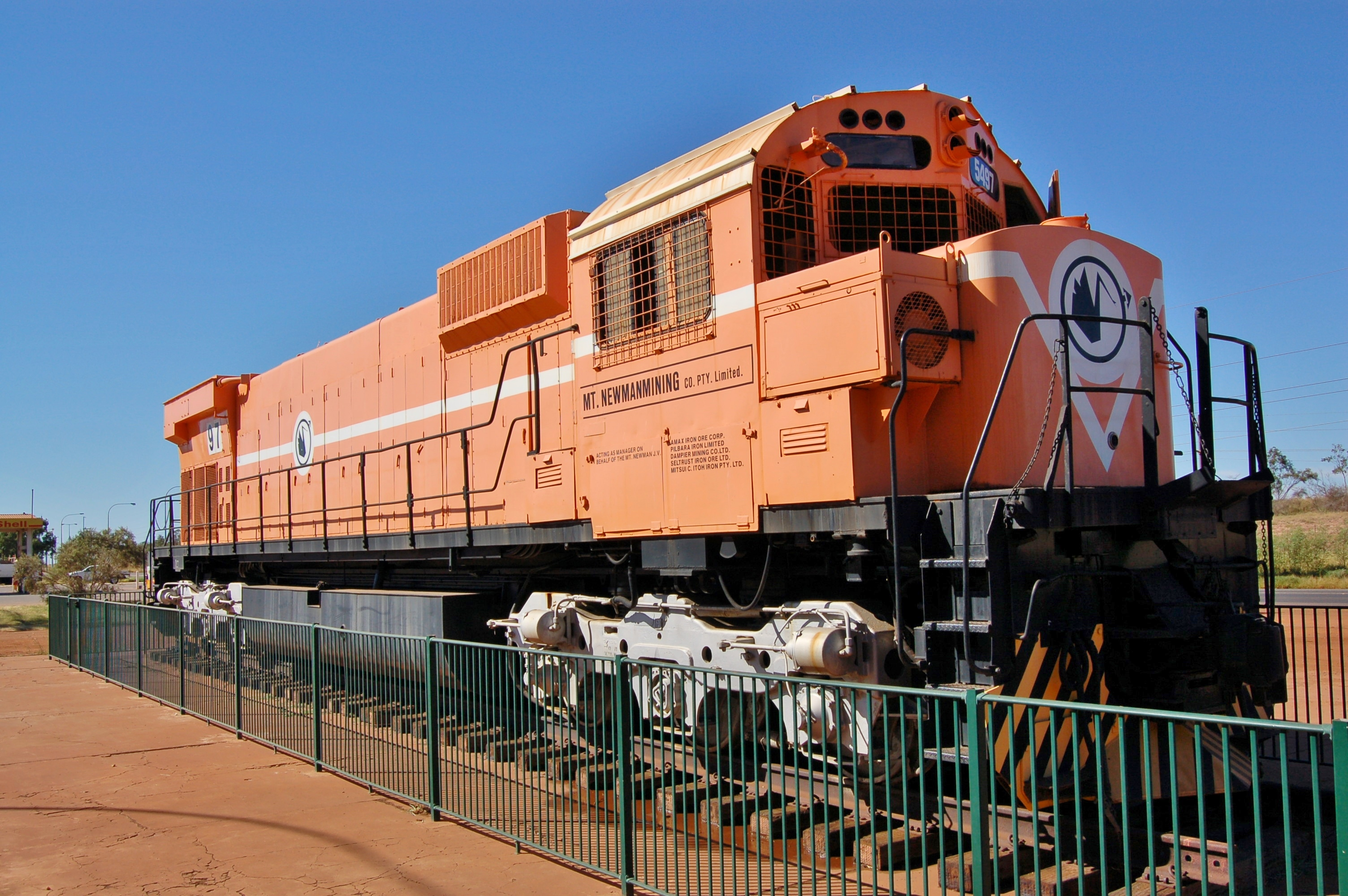
Preserved Mount Newman Mining MLW M636 diesel locomotive in April 2012

- 1 MRWA E class locomotive
- 10 WAGR B class locomotives
- 11 Westrail N class diesel locomotives
- Alco 636 M636 diesel locomotives for Hamersley Iron
- 21 Alco 636 diesel locomotives for Mount Newman Mining
- 12 Alco 636 diesel locomotives for Robe River Mining

== Electric locomotives ==
=== New South Wales ===
- 10 85 class electric locomotive
- 50 86 class electric locomotive

=== Queensland ===
- 18 3100 class electric locomotive
- 68 3200 class electric locomotive

== Diesel multiple units ==
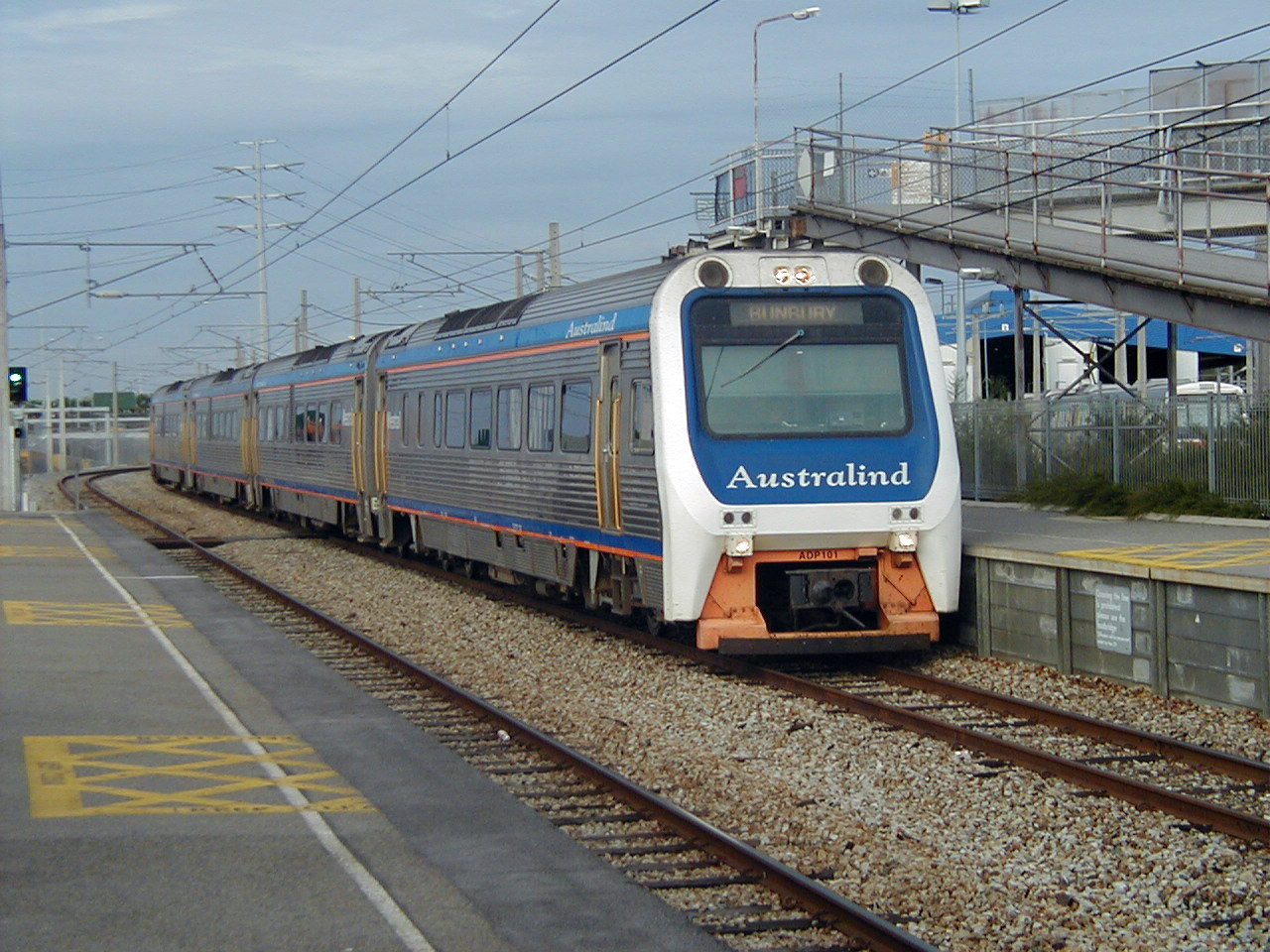
Westrail ADP/ADQ class

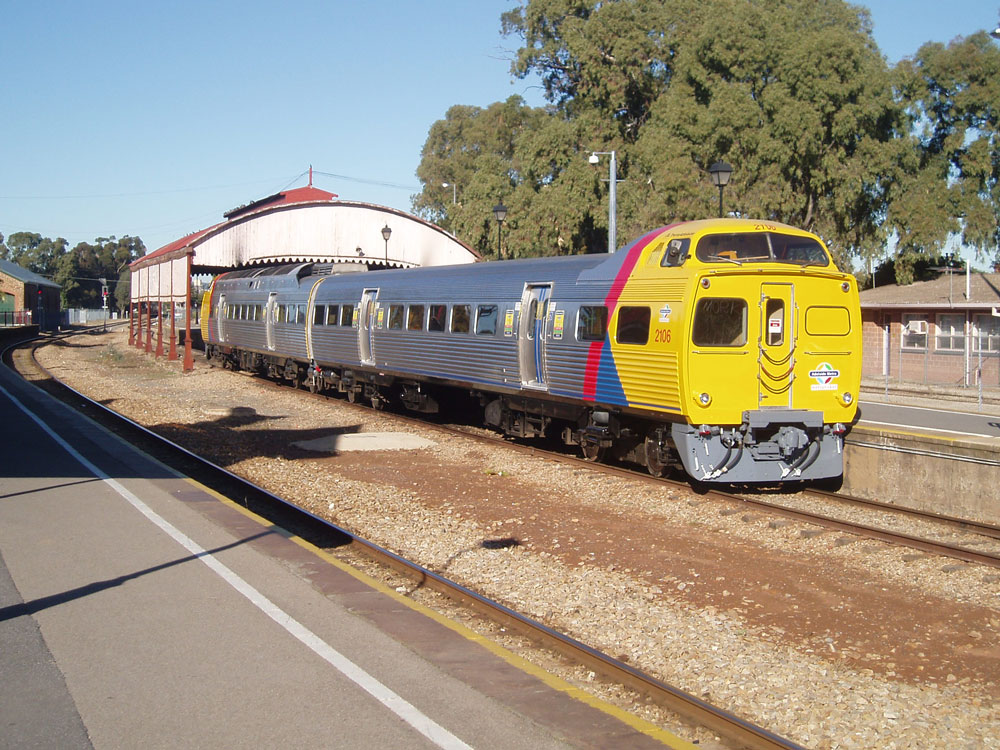
TransAdelaide 2000 class railcar

=== New South Wales ===
- 5 1100 class Budd railcars

=== Queensland ===
- 24 1800 class railcars
- 2 1900 class railcars
- 40 2000 class railcars

=== South Australia ===
- 30 2000 class Adelaide suburban diesel railcars
- 20 3000 class Adelaide suburban diesel railcars

=== Western Australia ===
- 10 West Australian ADK diesel multiple units
- 8 West Australian Prospector diesel railcars
- 5 West Australian Australind diesel railcars

=== Tasmania ===
- 6 Tasmanian Government Railways DP class railcars

=== India ===
- Numerous diesel railcars for Indian Railways

== Electric multiple units ==
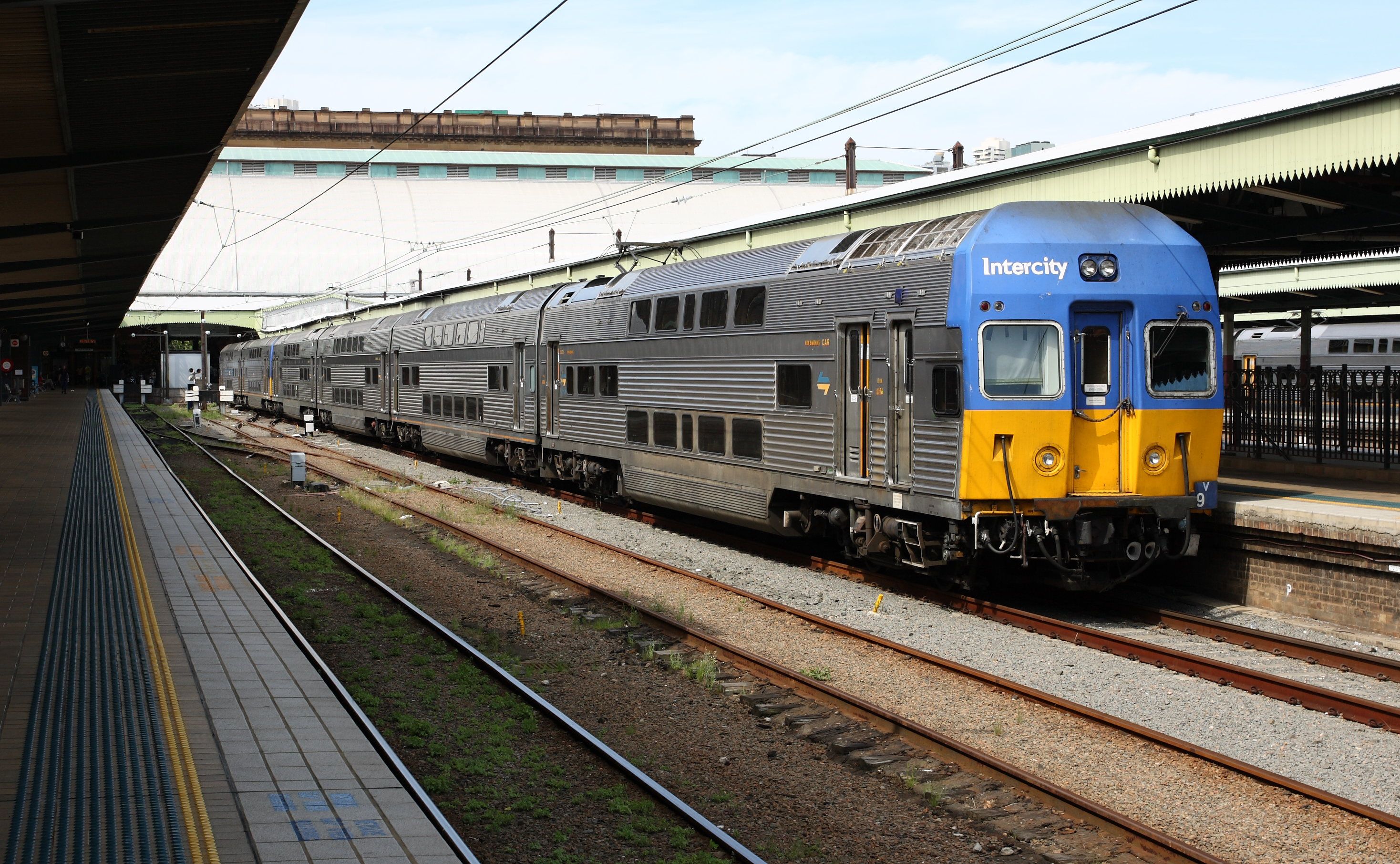
New South Wales V set

=== New South Wales ===
- 80 W set Sydney suburban carriages
- 80 U set Intercity carriages
- 359 S set Sydney suburban carriages
- 246 V set Intercity carriages
- 11 Skitube electric carriages

=== Victoria ===
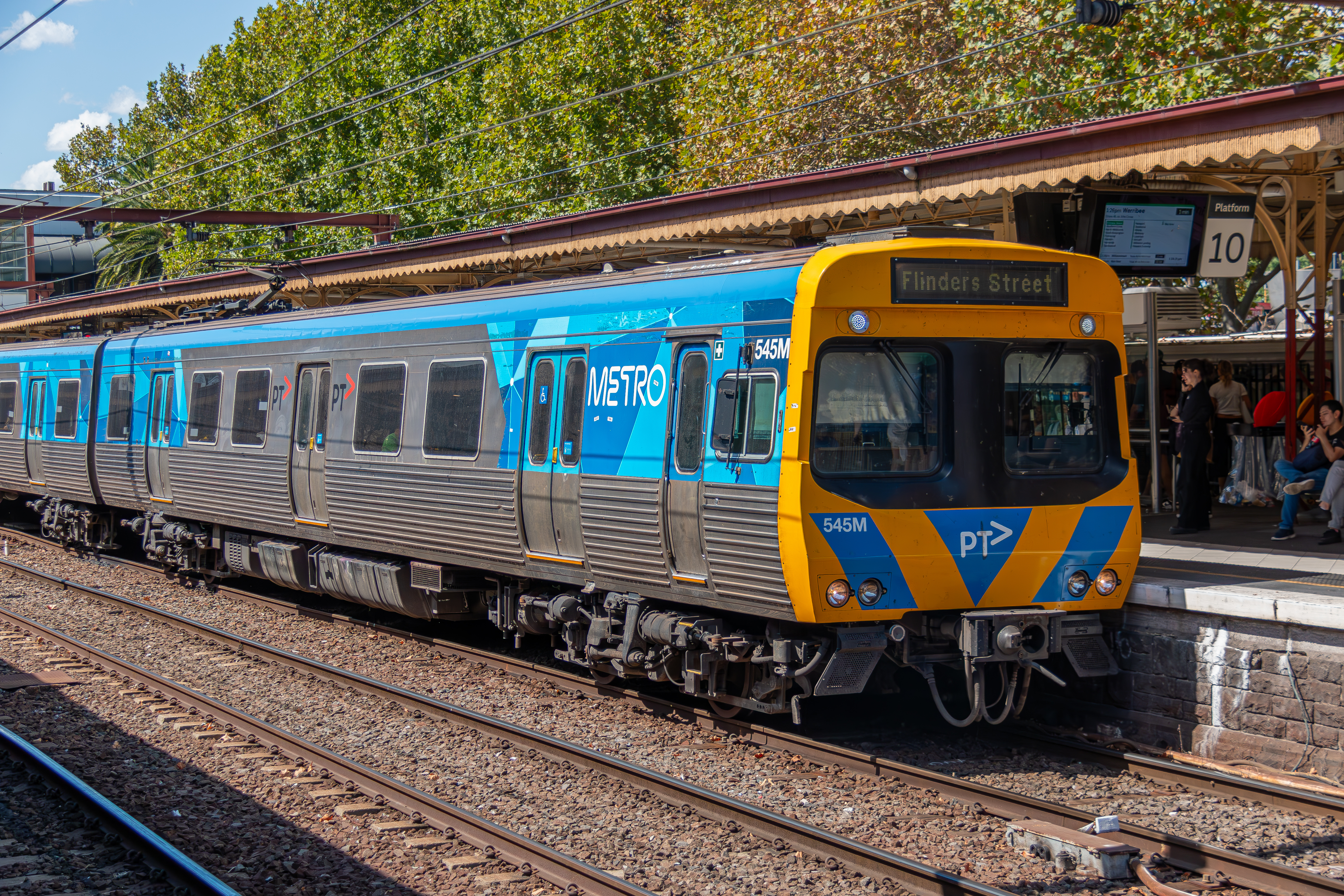
Comeng train in Metro livery

- 570 Comeng Melbourne suburban carriages

== Carriages ==
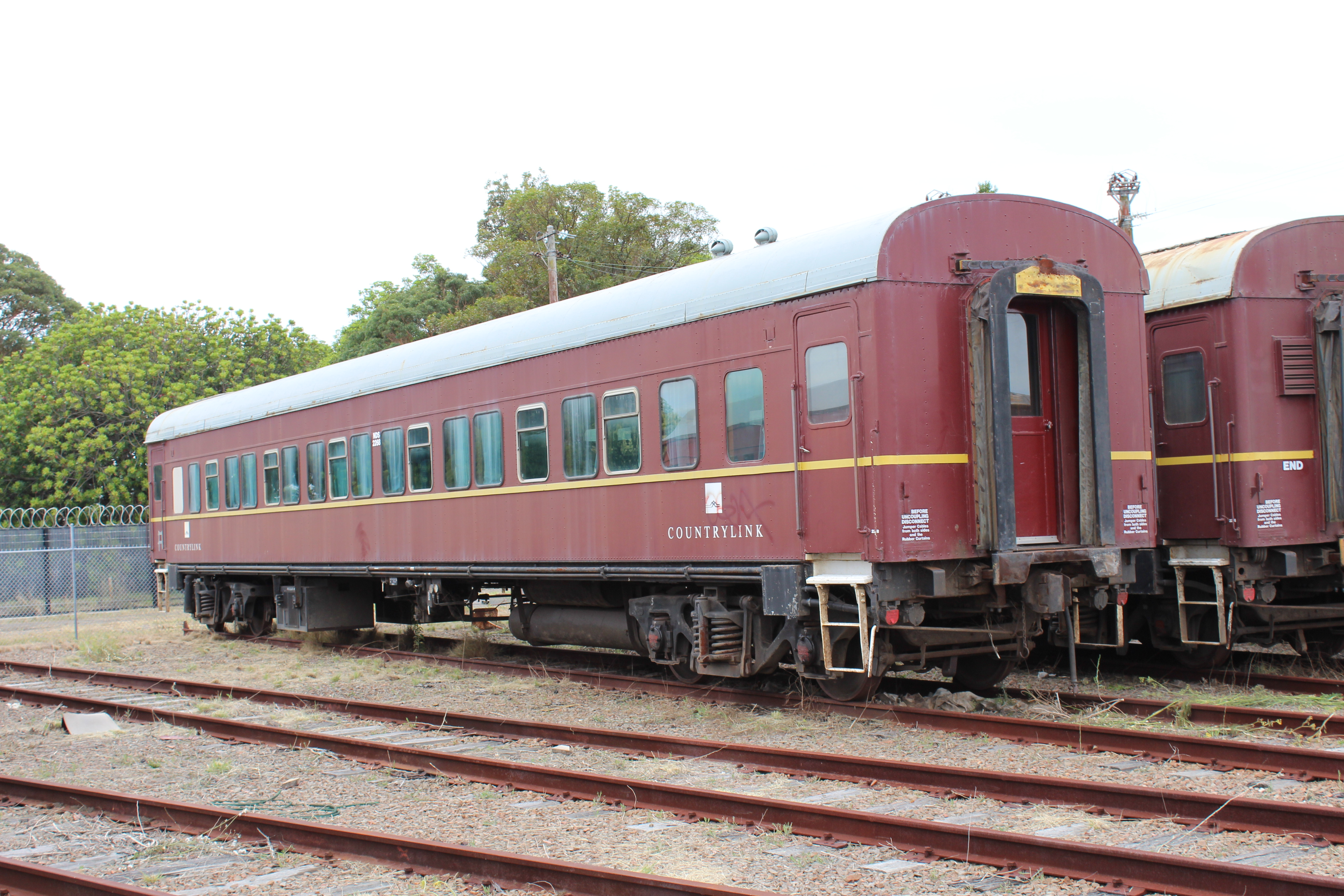
CountryLink RUB carriage at Broadmeadow Locomotive Depot in December 2012

=== Commonwealth Railways ===
- 24 carbon steel carriages
- 124 stainless steel carriages

=== Long Island Rail Road ===
- 10 C1 bilevel cars (design only; built by Tokyu Car Corporation)

=== New South Wales ===
- 35 N type carriages
- 67 RUB carriages
- 75 stainless steel carriages
- 47 XPT carriages

=== Queensland ===
- 99 steel carriages
- 35 stainless steel carriages
- 112 suburban stainless steel carriages (SX)

== Trams and light rail ==
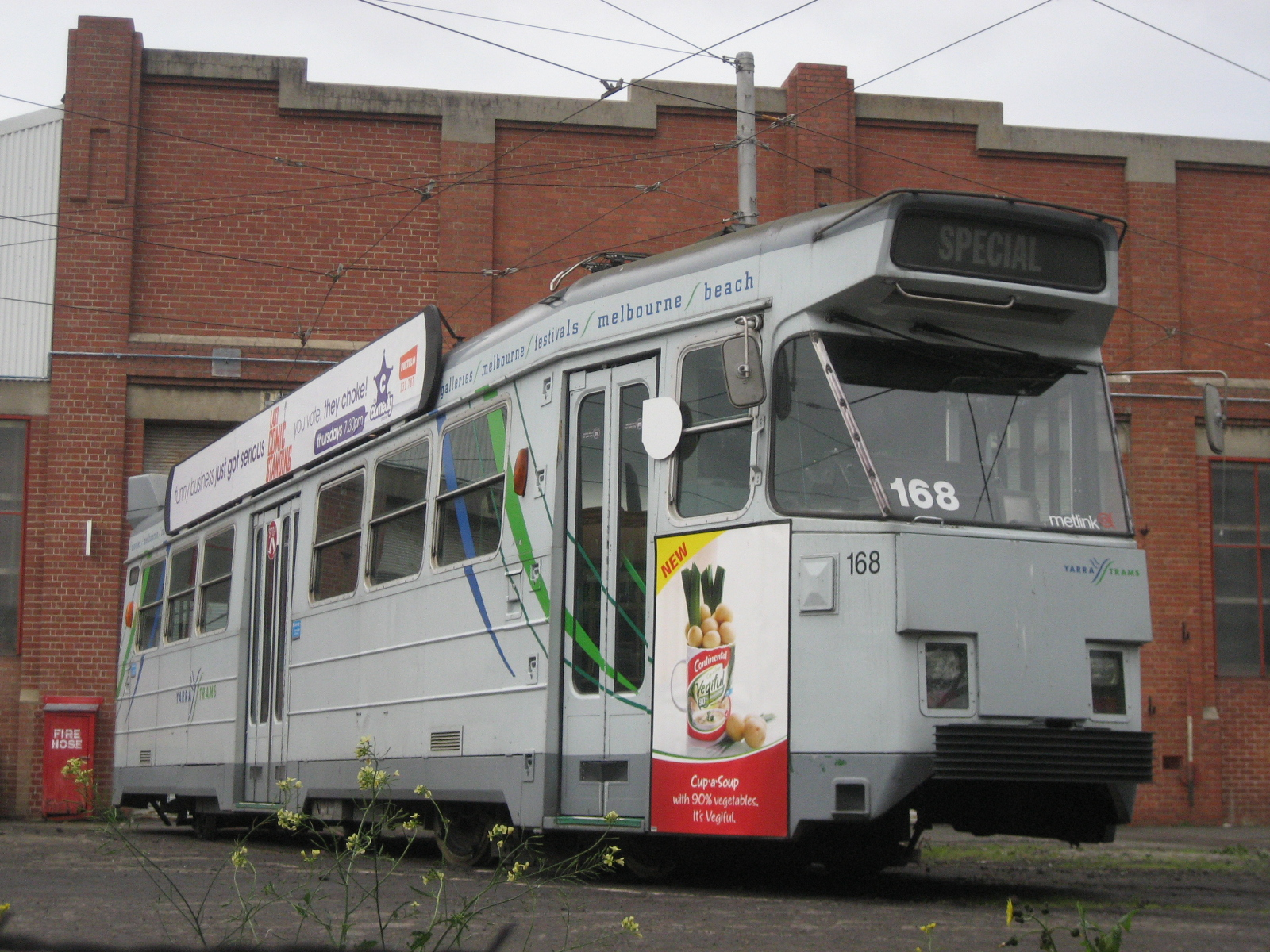
Z class Melbourne tram 168 at Preston Workshops in August 2007

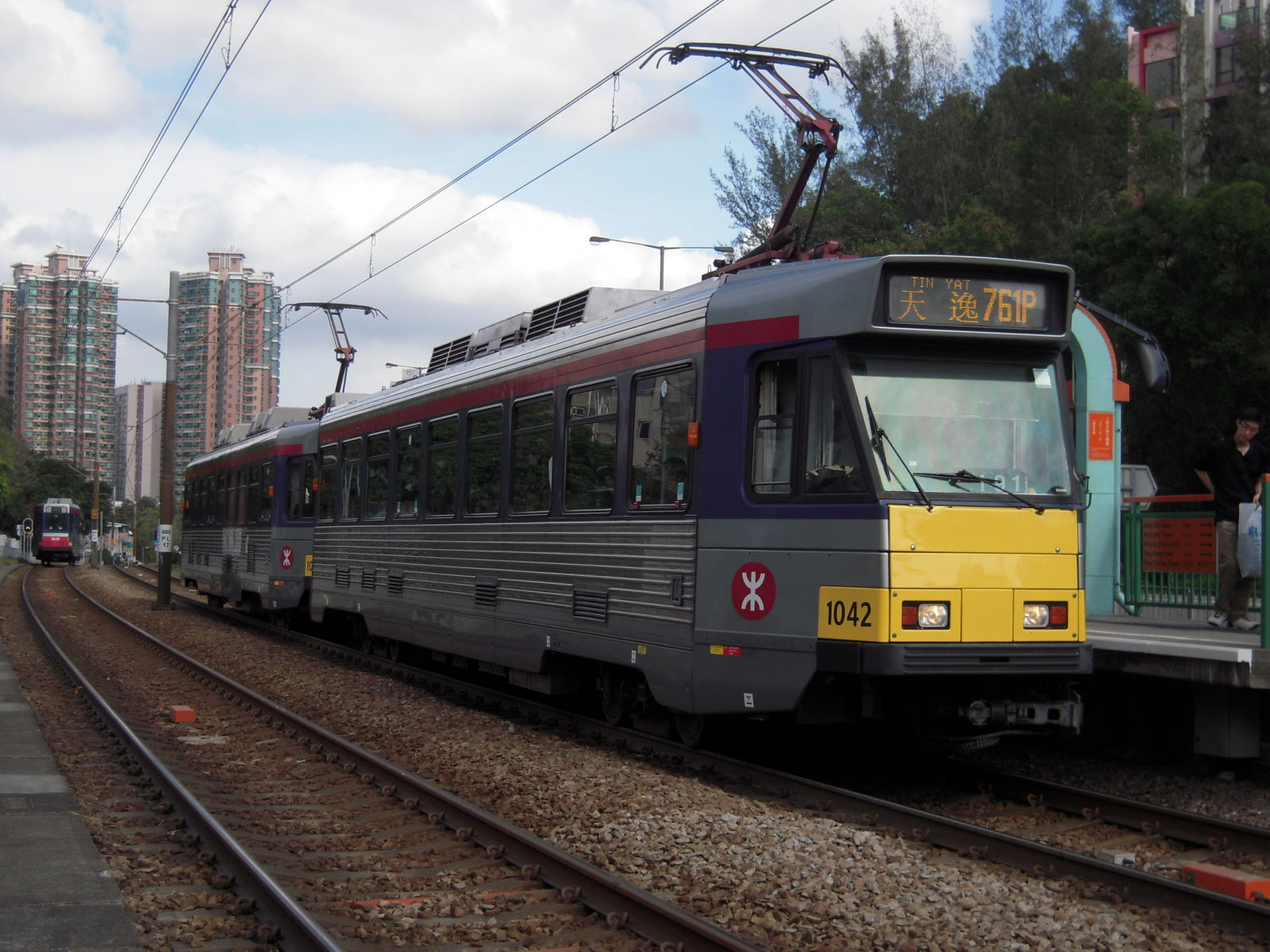
MTR Light Rail Phase I vehicle (pre-refurbishment)

=== New South Wales ===
- 100 R1 class Sydney trams

=== Victoria ===
- 230 Z class Melbourne trams
- 70 A class Melbourne trams
- 132 B class Melbourne trams

=== Hong Kong ===
- 70 MTR Phase I Light Rail Vehicles 1988

== Bibliography ==
- Dunn, John (2006). Comeng: A history of Commonwealth Engineering: Volume 1: 1921-1955. Rosenberg Publishing. ISBN 1877058424.
- Dunn, John (2008). Comeng: A history of Commonwealth Engineering: Volume 2: 1955-1966. Rosenberg Publishing. ISBN 978-1877058738.
- Dunn, John (2010). Comeng: A history of Commonwealth Engineering: Volume 3: 1967-1977. Rosenberg Publishing. ISBN 9781877058905.
- Dunn, John (2013). Comeng: A history of Commonwealth Engineering: Volume 4: 1977-1985. Rosenberg Publishing. ISBN 9781922013514.
- Dunn, John (2013). Comeng: A History of Commonwealth Engineering: Volume 5: 1985–1990. Rosenberg Publishing. ISBN 978-1-922013-52-1.
