= Lloyd Street, Perth =

Street in Perth, Western Australia

Lloyd Street is a street in the eastern suburbs of Perth, Western Australia. As of 2026, the street consists of two disconnected sections, north and south of the Helena River. A bridge project is planned to connect the two sections and connect the southern end to Great Eastern Highway Bypass at Abernethy Road.

== Route ==
Lloyd Street consists of two disconnected sections. The northern section runs from Bishop Road in Middle Swan to south of Clayton Road in Midland. The southern section runs from Stirling Crescent to Lakes Road in Hazelmere.

== History ==
In 2002, a planning control area over the area was declared, allowing the Western Australian Planning Commission to acquire land for the route for the extension of Lloyd Street from Clayton Street to Great Eastern Highway Bypass.

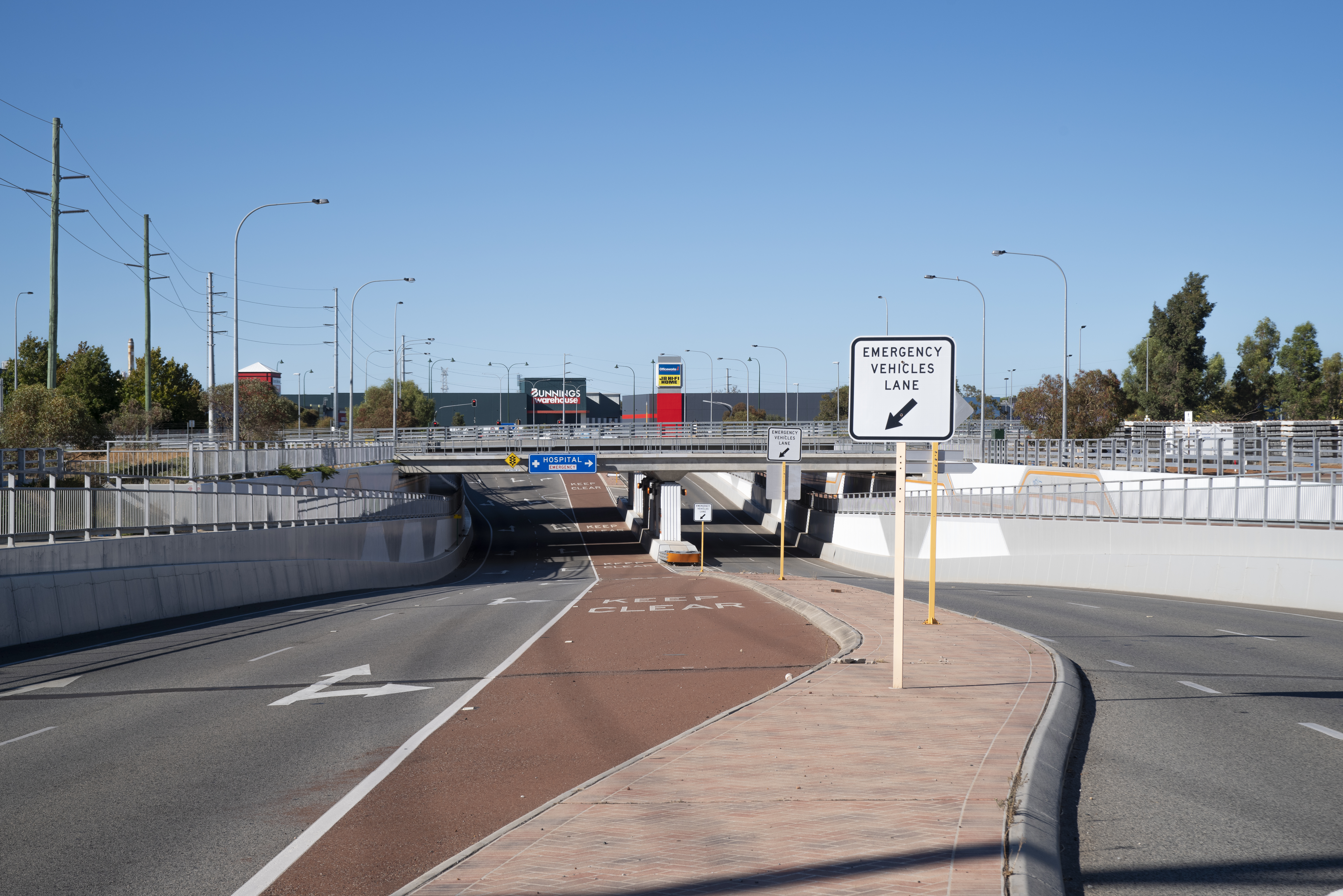
The underpass below the railway line

In the May 2012 state budget, $57.7 million was allocated to fund an underpass at the Eastern Railway for Lloyd Street. The federal government also committed $10 million and the City of Swan committed $3 million. The ongoing redevelopment of the Midland Railway Workshops and the future St John of God Midland Hospital were expected to increase traffic in the area, and the underpass would allow for ambulances to not be held up by trains. By April 2014, the project was running late, prompting concerns that the underpass would not be ready in time for the hospital's opening. By September 2014, a design and construct contract had been awarded. From October 2014, Lloyd Street was closed between Great Eastern Highway and Clayton Street so that the underpass could be built. The underpass was built by pouring diaphragm walls and then excavating the earth between the walls. The underpass opened in November 2015, in advance of the hospital's opening. The underpass included three bridges: one for the freight line, one for a future passenger rail extension, and one road bridge for secondary access to the hospital.

=== Extension ===
The extension of Lloyd Street across the Helena River and through Hazelmere to Great Eastern Highway Bypass has long been planned by the City of Swan.

In the 2019 Australian federal budget, $20 million was allocated to the extension of Lloyd Street through Hazelmere.

As part of the Great Eastern Highway Bypass interchanges project, the two sections of Lloyd Street were to be connected by a bridge across the Helena River and the southern end extended to a diamond interchange with Great Eastern Highway Bypass and Abernethy Road. The contract for the project was awarded to a consortium of Laing O'Rourke, AECOM, and Arcadis in February 2021.

The City of Swan approved the bridge in March 2022, despite protests from traditional owners over the bridge's impact on a billabong and an ancient Aboriginal rock shelter. The bridge was to be 54 metres (177 ft) long. The traditional owners proposed building the bridge slightly to the west where the river is narrower, near where a previous bridge was. In June 2022, Transport Minister Rita Saffioti paused the project in response to these concerns.

An agreement with the traditional owners for the extension's design was reached in July 2026. The extension would take its originally-planned route, but have a 20 percent smaller footprint and have a 180-metre (590 ft) bridge across the river, with two sets of piers located away from sensitive areas. Construction is expected to begin by the end of 2026.
