= New South Wales 85 class locomotive =

New South Wales 85 class
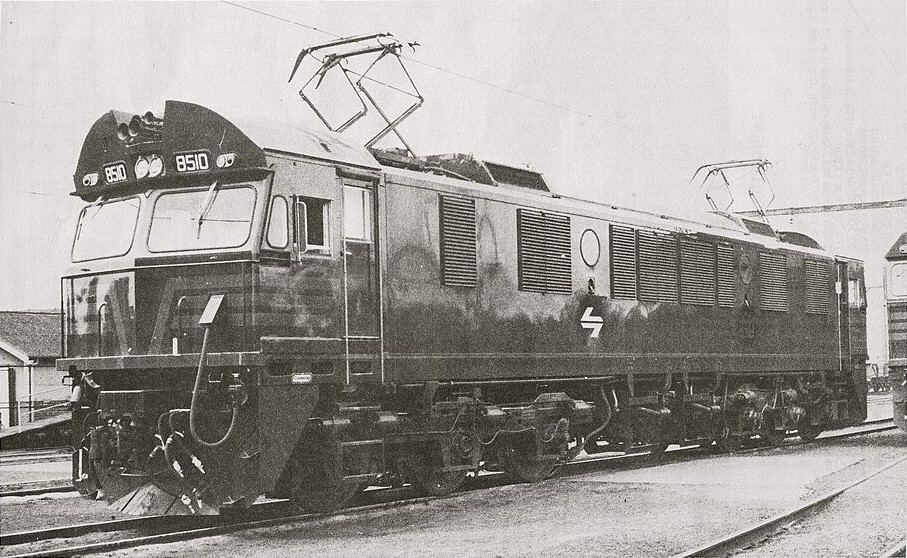
- 8510 in 1979
Type and origin
- Power type: Electric
- Builder: Comeng, Granville
- Build date: 1979-1980
- Total produced: 10
Specifications
- Configuration
  - UIC: Co′Co′
- Gauge: 1,435 mm (4 ft 8 1/2 in) standard gauge
- Wheel diameter: 1,250 mm (49.21 in)
- Wheelbase: 14.40 m (47 ft 2 7/8 in)
- Length: Over headstocks 17.73 m (58 ft 2 in), Over coupler pulling faces: 19.00 m (62 ft 4 in)
- Width: 2,960 mm (9 ft 8 1/2 in)
- Height: Over stowed pantograph: 4,305 mm (14 ft 1 1/2 in)
- Axle load: 20.5 tonnes (20.2 long tons; 22.6 short tons)
- Loco weight: 123.0 tonnes (121.1 long tons; 135.6 short tons)
- Electric system/s: 1,500 V DC Overhead
- Current pickup: Two pantographs
- Traction motors: 6 × Mitsubishi MB-485-AVR
Performance figures
- Maximum speed: 130 km/h (81 mph)
- Power output: One hour: 2,880 kW (3,860 hp); Continuous: 2,700 kW (3,620 hp)
- Tractive effort: Continuous: 222.00 kN (49,908 lbf) at 45 km/h (28 mph)
Career
- Operators: Public Transport Commission; State Rail Authority; FreightCorp
- Number in class: 10
- Numbers: 8501-8510
- First run: 30 May 1979
- Last run: 29 April 1998
- Preserved: 8501, 8507
- Disposition: 2 preserved, remainder scrapped

The 85 class are a type of 10 electric locomotives built by Comeng, Granville between May 1979 and July 1980 for the Public Transport Commission.

== History ==
When introduced they were the most powerful locomotives in Australia with a rating of 2,880 kW. Based at Lithgow depot they were purchased principally to haul coal trains over the Blue Mountains line. They also hauled other freight trains and on occasions passenger services including the Indian Pacific.

In 1982, an empty grain train led by two 85 classes with 8505 at the front collided with an empty coal train as the result of a wrong side signal failure. The guard on the coal train was badly injured and the driver of the grain train was killed.

Following the Illawarra line being electrified in 1986, 85s began to operate coal trains from Lithgow through to Port Kembla. They also occasionally hauled coal services from Glenlee Colliery on the Main South line to Port Kembla and Rozelle. They did not operate on the Main North line although in 1993 all were hauled to Taree for repainting at Landsdowne Engineering.

A combination of National Rail electing to use diesel locomotives on electrified lines and a move to an open access model in New South Wales resulting in electric traction being priced out of the market saw the need for electric traction drop. In April 1998, the 85 class were withdrawn and stored at Lithgow.

In July 2000, FreightCorp moved three of the class to Werris Creek. Two were sold for preservation, 8501 to the Sydney Electric Train Society and 8507 to the Dorrigo Steam Railway & Museum. The remainder were sold in 2003 to Silverton Rail and scrapped at Broken Hill.

== Construction ==
Only 10 locomotives were built in the span of two years. All by Commonwealth Engineering at Granville. Comeng had also built the diesel powered 80 classes. This is likely why the car bodies are similar in appearance. Electrical equipment was provided by Mitsubishi with two diamond pantographs placed in depressions in the roof.

== Fleet status ==
Number	Entered service	Withdrawn	Location	Status
8501	30/05/1979	29/04/1998	Werris Creek, NSW	Stored
8502	17/09/1979	23/04/1998	-	Scrapped
8503	04/02/1980	21/01/1998	-	Scrapped
8504	26/02/1980	20/03/1998	-	Scrapped
8505	16/04/1980	23/04/1998	-	Scrapped
8506	26/05/1980	16/04/1998	-	Scrapped
8507	13/06/1980	24/04/1998	West Tamworth, NSW	Stored
8508	30/06/1980	29/04/1998	-	Scrapped
8509	10/07/1980	22/02/1998	-	Scrapped
8510	28/07/1980	24/04/1998	-	Scrapped
