= Australind (train) =

Passenger train in Western Australia

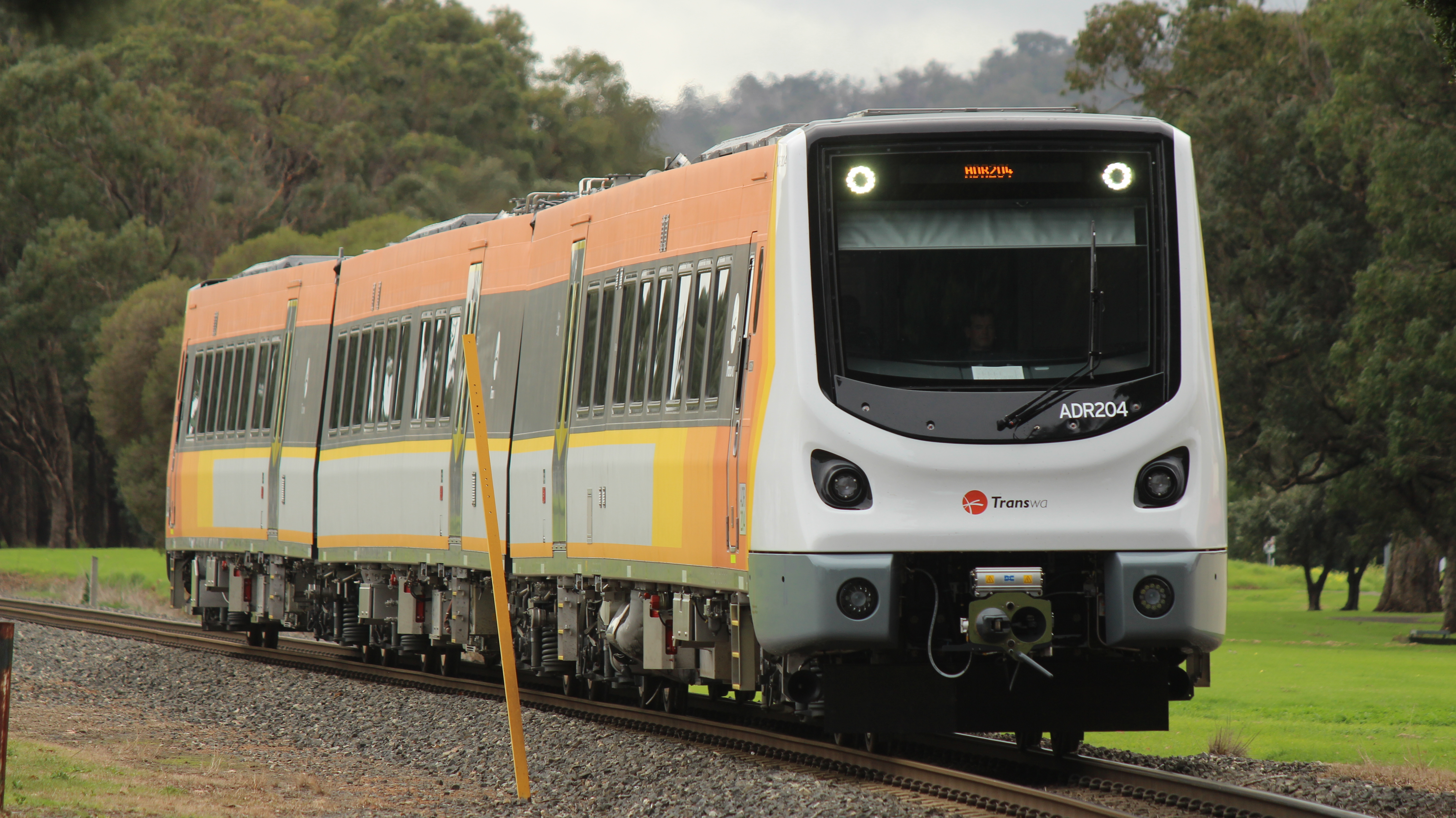
- Australind on approach to Harvey, June 2026

Overview
- Service type: Passenger train
- Status: Operational
- Locale: South West Western Australia
- First service: 24 November 1947
- Current operator: Transwa
- Former operators: 1947–1975: WAGR; 1975–2000: Westrail; 2000–2003: WAGR Commission
- Ridership: 77,810 (year to June 2023)

Route
- Termini: Perth; Bunbury
- Stops: 13
- Distance travelled: 167 km (104 mi)
- Average journey time: 2 hours 30 minutes
- Service frequency: Two return services daily
- Train number: 9/10
- Line used: South Western Railway

Technical
- Rolling stock: ADR/ADS class
- Track gauge: 1,067 mm (3 ft 6 in)

The Australind is a rural passenger train service in Western Australia operated by Transwa on the South Western Railway between Perth and Bunbury.

== History ==
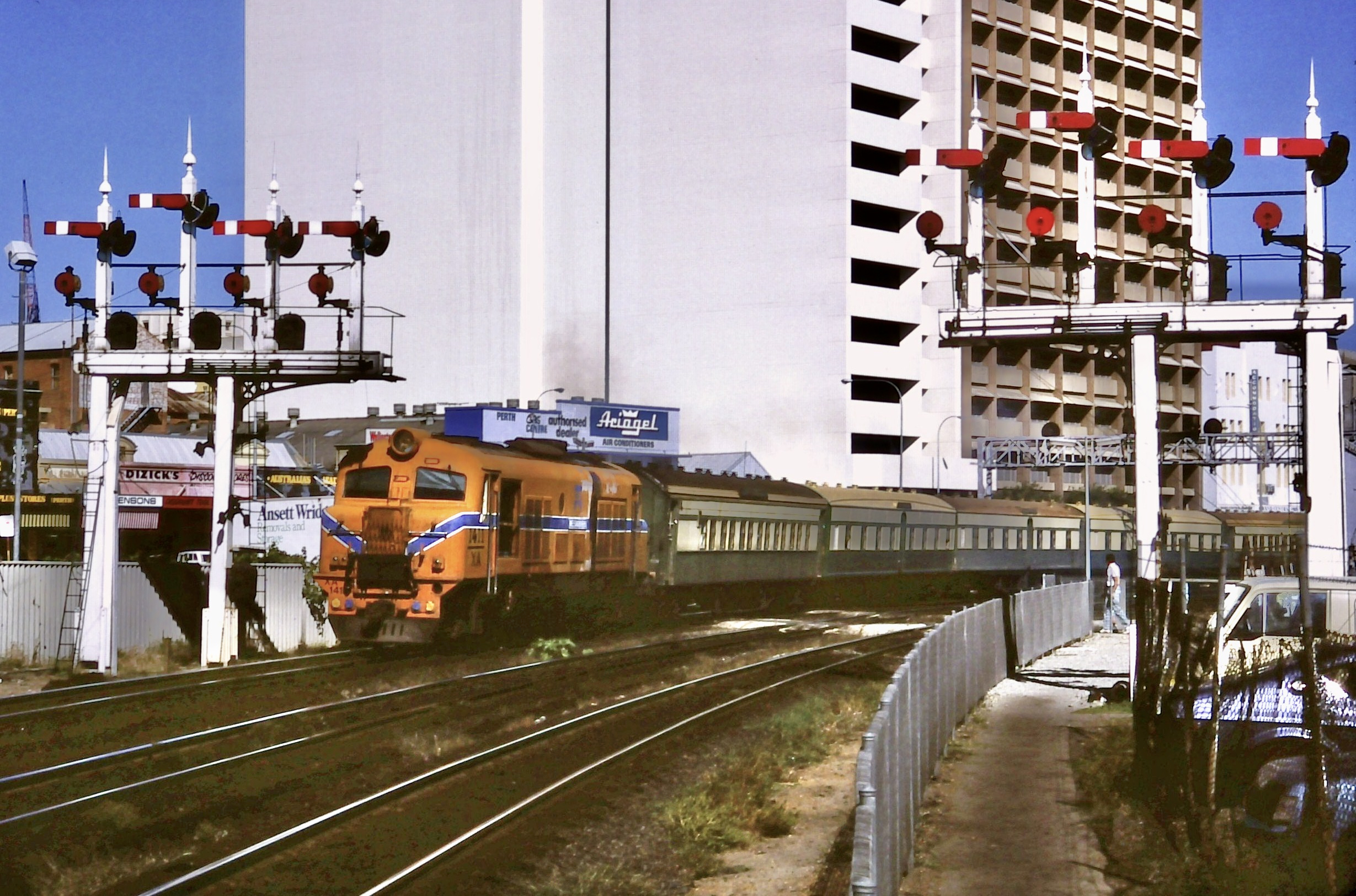
The Australind, with its original 1947-built passenger cars, leaves Perth railway station in March 1986 hauled by an X class locomotive

The Australind service began on 24 November 1947 and was hauled initially by U class steam locomotives. With an average speed of 63 km/h (39 mph), it was the fastest narrow gauge passenger train in Australia. It was named to commemorate the city of that name envisioned by Marshall Waller Clifton on Leschenault Inlet 100 years previously. The current hamlet of Australind, a satellite town of Bunbury, has never had a passenger rail service, nor even a railway line.

In February 1958, X class diesel locomotives took over. The service was relaunched on 1 October 1960 with onboard catering removing the need for an extended stop at Pinjarra. In November 1987, the ADP/ADQ class railcars took over the service, reducing the journey time to 2 hours 30 minutes.

In November 2023 the service was suspended due to the shutdown of the Armadale line for upgrading. The suspension also marked the retirement of the ADP/ADQ class trainsets, with the final two services – reserved for invited special guests – conducted on 18 and 19 November 2023. The route was then temporarily replaced by coach bus services. Although originally scheduled to re-open in mid-2025, delays in the upgrade of the Armadale line pushed back the resumption of train services to June 2026, which also introduced new ADR/ADS class railcars based on the Transperth C-series train to the route.

The resumed service was inaugurated on 28 June 2026, with a community event held at Bunbury Terminal; the first public service started operating on 29 June 2026. The resumed service initially started operating with a limited timetable of four return services per week and only one ADR/ADS class railcar on the route, with replacement coach bus services continuing until a second railcar came online on 12 October 2026, which also saw the regular timetable of two return services a day reinstated.

Transwa plans to double the number of services from two return services to four return services a day in 2027.

== Rolling stock ==
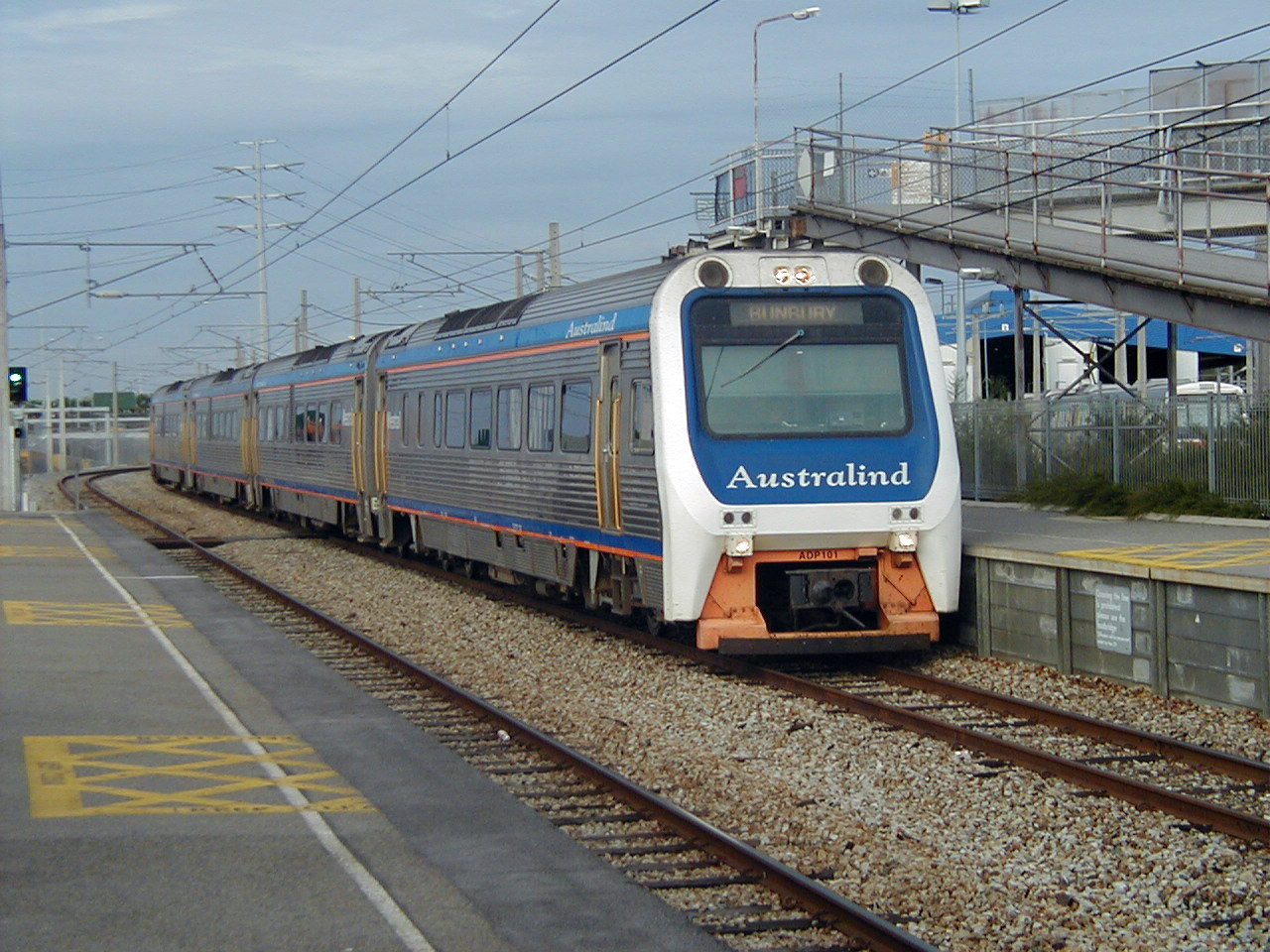
Original livery

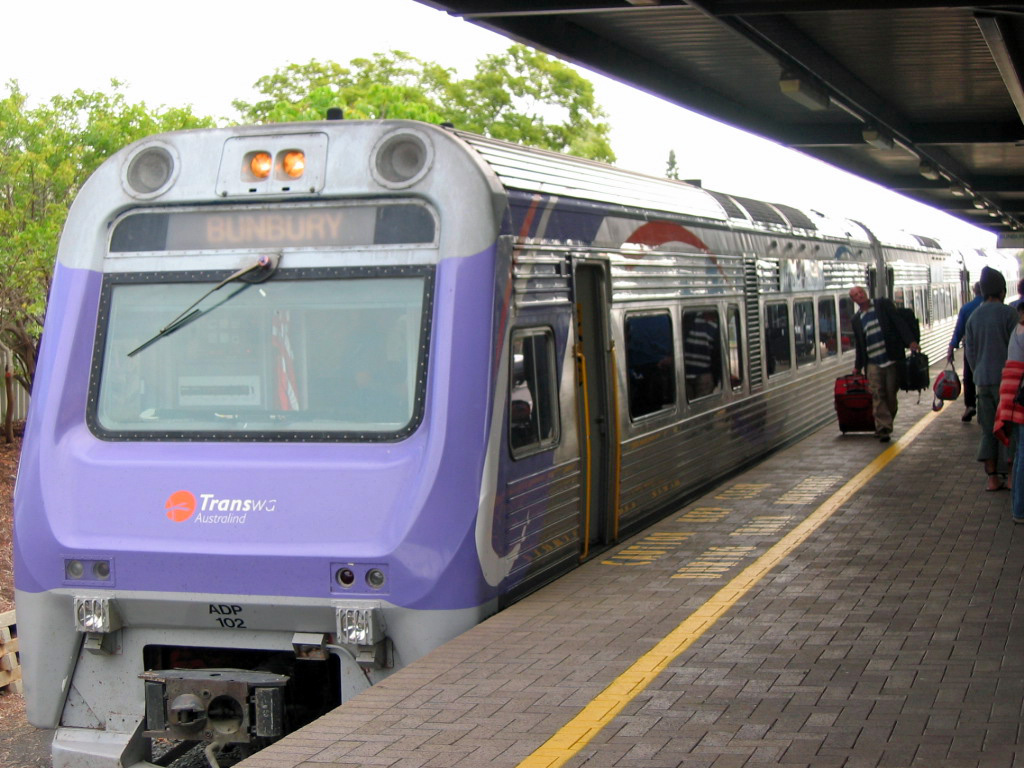
2003 refurbished livery

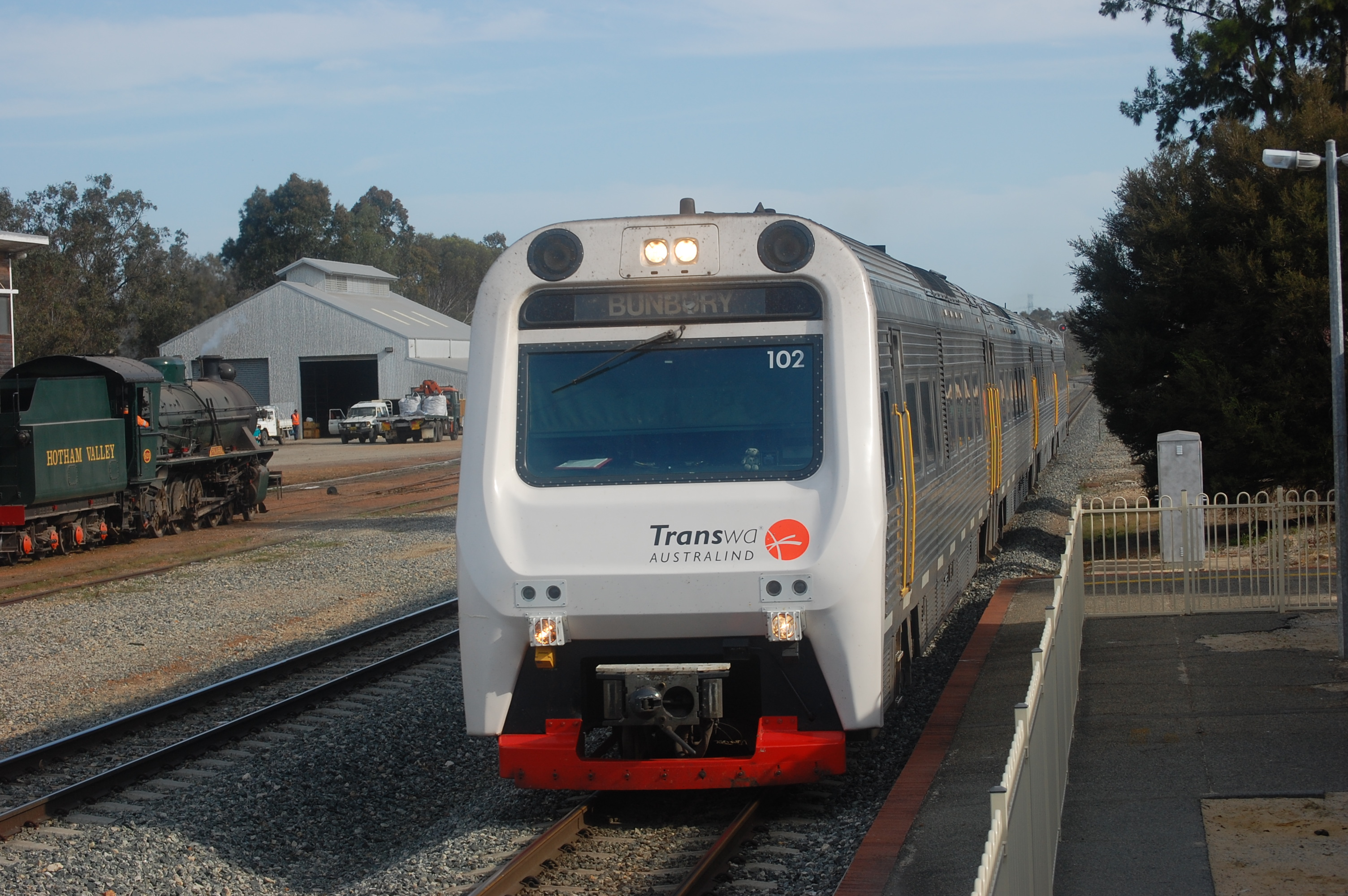
2007 refurbished livery

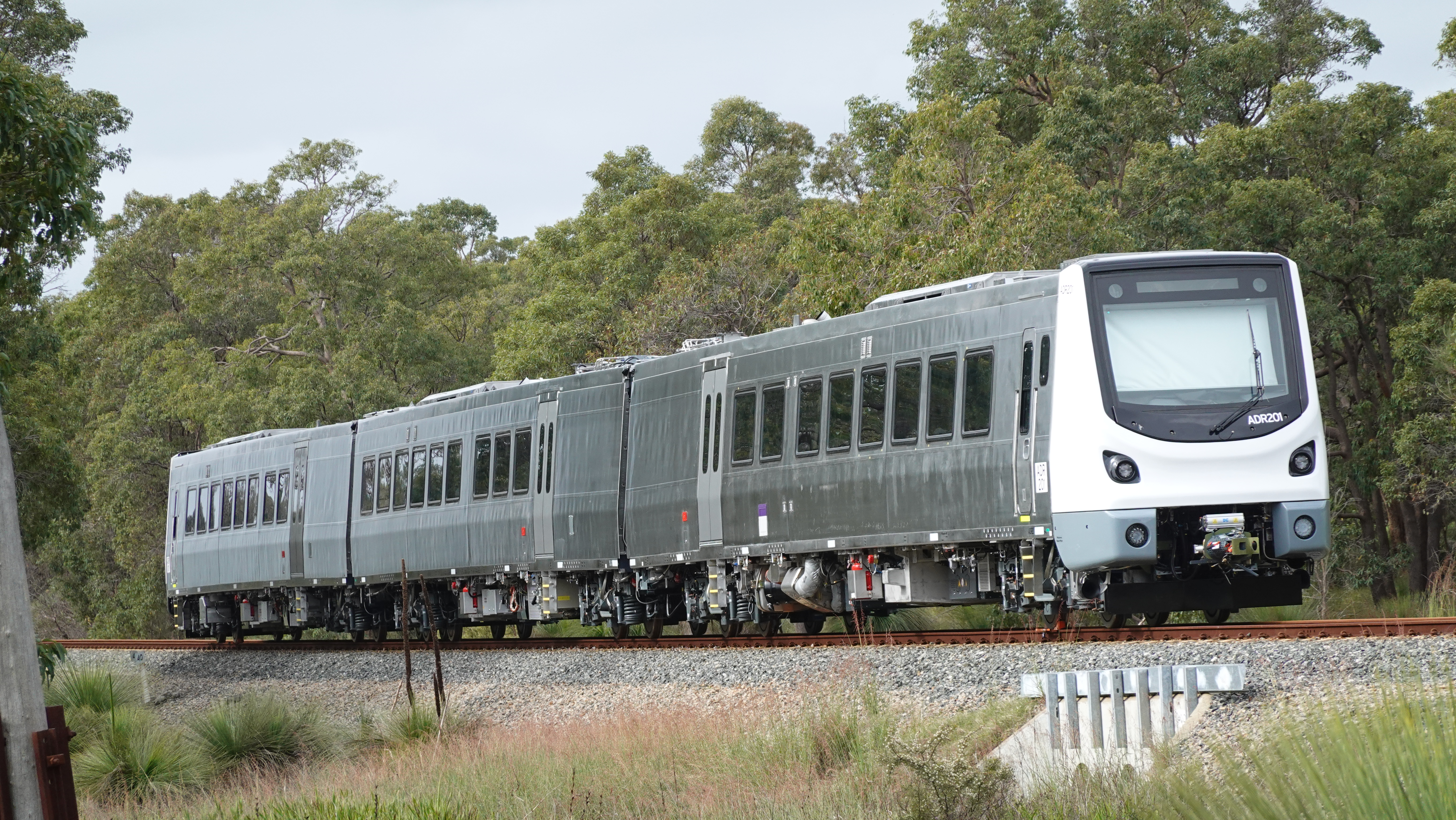
New Australind during testing in 2025, without the final livery

When introduced, the train consisted of new carriages built by the Midland Railway Workshops. In August 1985, Westrail awarded Comeng, Bassendean a contract for five Westrail ADP/ADQ class railcars, three ADPs with driving cabs and two ADQs, using a similar body shell and interior fitout to the New South Wales XPT carriages. Each carriage was powered by a Cummins KTA19 coupled to a Voith transmission. They usually operated as a three or four carriage set as five carriage set operation is not possible due to the limited platform length available at Perth station.

In July 2003, the trains were painted in a new livery in line with the formation of Transwa. In 2007, the trains were painted white as part of a refurbishment program. In 2010/11, new seats were fitted.

In 2019, two new ADR/ADS class railcars sets, each consisting of a three-car diesel multiple unit, were ordered for the Australind at a cost of $54 million. The trains were built by Alstom in Bellevue as diesel-powered variants of the Transperth C-series trains already under construction. In January 2025 it was announced that two additional train sets would be procured for the route for $80 million; the new trains were obtained to increase reliability and future frequency of the service. Testing for the new trains began in 2025. The four new train sets, named Marley, Kwilena, Koombana and Linda following a public competition, were gradually introduced to the service when the route resumed in 2026.

== Route ==
The Australind departs from Perth traversing the metropolitan Armadale line to Armadale, then the South Western Railway to Bunbury.

=== Stations ===
The Australind stops at the following set of stations:

- Perth
- Armadale
- Byford
- Mundijong
- Serpentine
- North Dandalup
- Pinjarra
- Waroona
- Yarloop
- Cookernup
- Harvey
- Brunswick Junction
- Bunbury

== Ridership ==
The Australind had 77,810 passengers in the year leading up to June 2023, the last full financial year before the temporary suspension of rail services between November 2023 and June 2026.

In the year leading up to June 2026, 49,575 passengers used the service when it was operated by coach buses due to the suspension of rail services.

== See also ==
- AvonLink
- MerredinLink
- Prospector
