= Claisebrook railway depot =

Railway depot in Perth, Western Australia

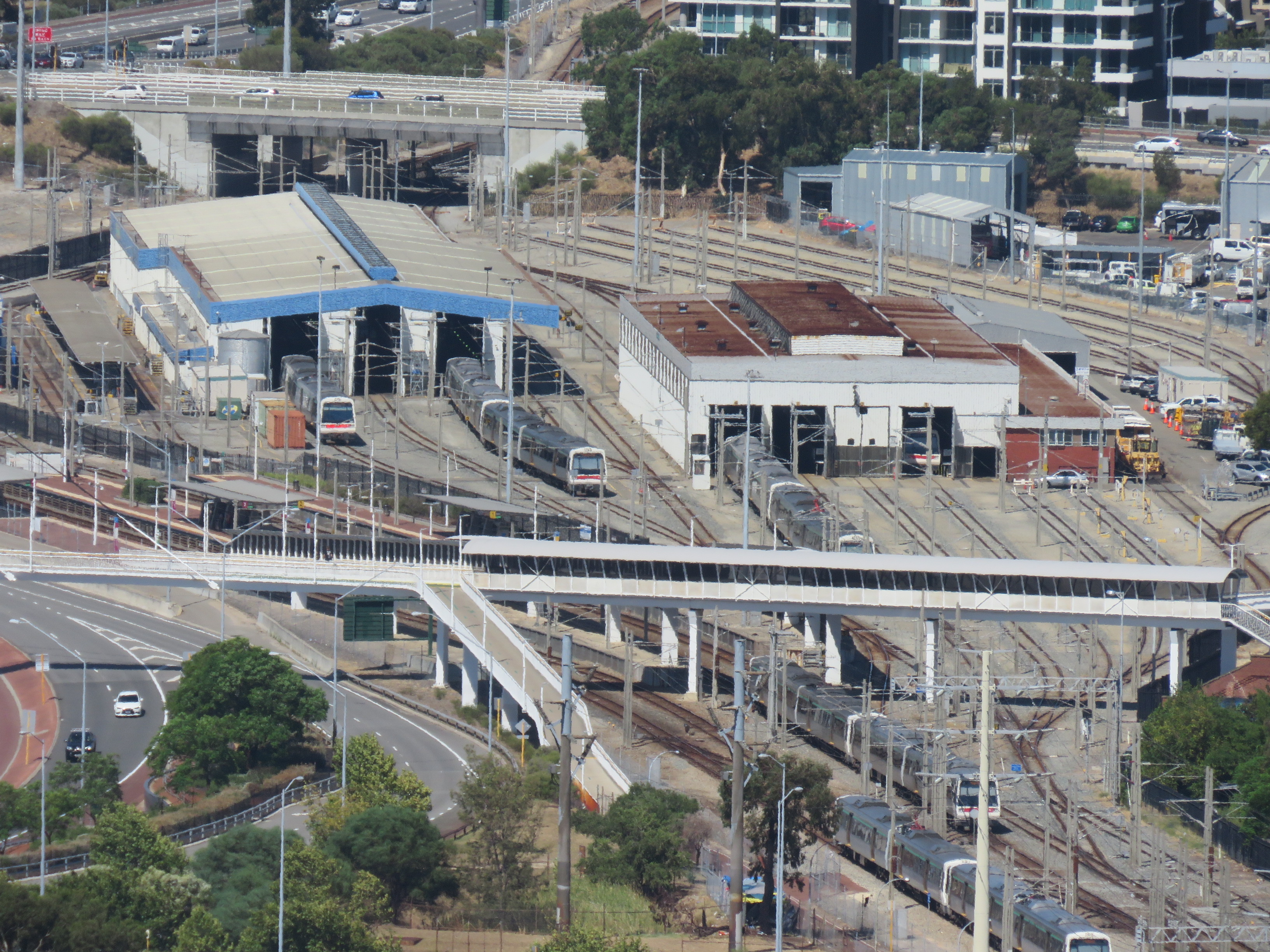
- The Claisebrook Depot in January 2021
- Interactive map of Claisebrook railway depot

Location
- Location: Kensington Street, East Perth, Western Australia
- Coordinates: 31°56′57″S 115°52′28″E

Characteristics
- Operator: Public Transport Authority
- Type: Cleaning, storage, maintenance, upgrades and repairs
- Roads: 18
- Rolling stock: Transperth A-series, Transperth B-series, and Transwa Australind railcars
- Routes served: Airport, Armadale, Fremantle, Midland, and Thornlie–Cockburn lines

Claisebrook railway depot (also known as Claisebrook railcar depot) is a Transperth depot adjacent to Claisebrook station, at 122 Kensington Street, East Perth. When trains leave this depot, they connect with the Midland, Fremantle, Armadale, Thornlie–Cockburn, Ellenbrook, and Airport, lines.

In the 1940s, Claisebrook road depot referred to the then tramway depot adjoining the railway property in East Perth and much earlier in the 1860s the term Claisebrook depot referred to the convict depot.

== Function ==
The railway depot's primary purpose is to service, refurbish and upgrade Transperth's A-Series railcars. The newer B-series railcars may also be stabled at Claisebrook railway depot for work that cannot be done at Mandurah or Nowergup at any time and for events such as the Australian Football League games on weekends at Perth Stadium and also for the Airport trains on the Airport Line. The depot has also recently started serving as the facility to maintain and refurbish the diesel-electric Transwa Australind railcars.

== Facilities ==
The Claisebrook railway depot has facilities to store, maintain and clean the fleet of railcars. Including;

- 2 Maintenance Workshops for both Electric multiple unit and Diesel multiple unit train sets.
- 2 Cleaning ramps.
- A wash road.
- 2 sets of dead end storage roads, designed to store an additional 25-30 car sets, depending on the car set length.

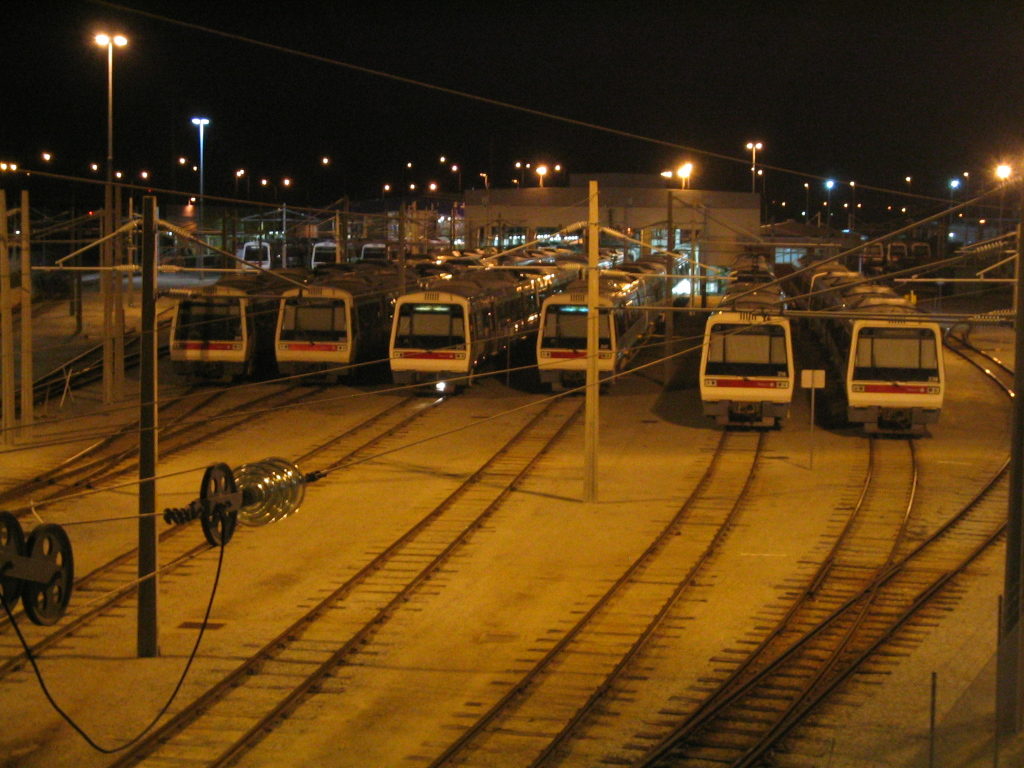
A-series trains stored at the Claisebrook railway depot.
