= Abernethy Road =

Road in Perth, Western Australia

Abernethy Road Western Australia

General information
- Type: Road
- Length: 14.7 km (9.1 mi)
- Route number(s): State Route 55 (Southeast of Fairbrother Street)

Major junctions
- Northwest end: Great Eastern Highway (National Highway 94 / National Route 1), Belmont
- Fairbrother Street (State Route 55); Leach Highway (State Route 7); Kewdale Road; Kalamunda Road
- Northeast end: Great Eastern Highway Bypass (National Highway 94), Hazelmere

Location(s)
- Major suburbs: Cloverdale, Kewdale, Forrestfield, High Wycombe

Abernethy Road is a 14.7-kilometre (9.1 mi) long minor arterial road linking Belmont with the Great Eastern Highway Bypass in Hazelmere, a suburb of Perth, Western Australia.

It runs along the eastern boundary of the Perth Airport area, and for many years until 2025 served as an alternative access road for the airport (via Grogan Road). It also provides the foothills suburbs with alternative access to the Perth central business district.

In 2014, an on-ramp joining with Tonkin Highway where Abernethy Road passes underneath was constructed, as part of Gateway WA.

== Route description ==
Beginning at the Great Eastern Highway in Belmont, the road passes in a south-easterly direction through residential Belmont before the Leach Highway, which it crosses. It proceeds through the Kewdale industrial area towards Tonkin Highway, where it turns to a north-easterly direction, with the remainder of the route travelling through the industrial area of Forrestfield, High Wycombe, and Hazelmere. The road ends at the Great Eastern Highway Bypass, which provides alternative access to South Guildford (to the west) or to Bellevue and Midland.

== History ==
In 1911, Abernethy Road was used as part of the boundary between the East Perth and Midland districts in the Western Australian Cricket Association's district scheme. Later that year, new work was completed on the road by the Belmont Road Board. In January 1913, the Wattle Grove Progress Association requested that the Darling Downs Road Board make repairs to Abernethy Road and other roads in the area. In March 1929, the residents of Maida Vale petitioned the road board to improve their section of Abernethy Road, which resulted in the foreman being instructed to install a culvert and plank footpath. In 1930, the road board undertook further work on Abernethy Road, using men eligible for unemployment relief payments. These works were funded by putting off the board's employees for a two-week period.

A new ramp from Abernethy Road to Tonkin Highway southbound was constructed as part of the $1 billion Gateway WA project. Construction of the ramp, and the Gateway WA project, officially began on 1 February 2013 with a groundbreaking ceremony attended by the state and federal transport ministers, Troy Buswell and Anthony Albanese, and was opened to the public in early 2014.

== Major intersections ==
All major intersections along Abernethy Road are controlled by traffic lights unless otherwise indicated below.

LGA	Location	km	mi	Destinations	Notes
Belmont	Ascot-Belmont boundary	0	0.0	Great Eastern Highway (National Highway 94 / National Route 1) – Perth, Midland, Perth Airport	North-western terminus of Abernethy Road, no right turn from Abernethy Road to Great Northern highway
Belmont	Belmont	1	0.62	Fairbrother Street (State Route 55) – Bayswater, Ascot, Redcliffe	State Route 55 north-western concurrency terminus, no right turn from Fairbrother Street to Abernethy Road
Belmont	Belmont	1.7	1.1	Alexander Road – Rivervale	
Belmont	Cloverdale	2.3	1.4	Wright Street – Kewdale	Access to Belmont Forum
Belmont	Cloverdale	2.6	1.6	Fulham Street – Kewdale	Access to Belmont Forum
Belmont	Cloverdale, Kewdale boundary	4.1	2.5	Leach Highway (State Route 7) – Fremantle, Wilson, Welshpool, Perth Airport	SPUI Interchange favouring Leach Highway. Also intersects an onramp from Tonkin Highway northbound prior to merging with Leach in order to avoid the need for weaving.
Belmont	Kewdale	4.6	2.9	Noble Street	
Belmont	Kewdale	5.3	3.3	Kewdale Road – Welshpool, Perth Airport	
Belmont	Kewdale	6.9	4.3	McDowell Street northbound/Terminal Road southbound - Kewdale Freight Terminal	A northbound offramp from Tonkin Highway intersects via McDowell Street.
Belmont	Kewdale	7.1	4.4	Daddow Road	
Belmont–Kalamunda border	Perth Airport, Forrestfield, Kewdale tripoint	7.4	4.6	Tonkin Highway (State Route 4) southbound / Roe Highway (State Route 3) Armadale, Fremantle, Midland, Jandakot	Southbound access to Tonkin Highway only, ramps to Roe Highway spur off prior to merging onto Tonkin.
Kalamunda	High Wycombe	10.8	6.7	Grogan Road - Perth Airport Terminals 1/2	Unsignalised intersection. To be closed once Perth Airport's third runway is under construction.
Kalamunda	High Wycombe	12.3	7.6	Dundas Road	Unsignalised intersection. Access to High Wycombe railway station.
Kalamunda-Swan border	High Wycombe, Perth Airport boundary	13.4	8.3	Kalamunda Road – South Guildford, Maida Vale, Kalamunda	
Swan	Perth Airport	14.3	8.9	Ulm Place westbound / Yagine Close eastbound	Roundabout
Swan	Hazelmere	14.7	9.1	Great Eastern Highway Bypass (National Highway 94) – Redcliffe, Guildford, Midland	Northeastern terminus. State Route 55 north-eastern concurrency terminus. To be replaced with a SPUI with the road continuing as Lloyd Street northbound to Midland.
1.000 mi = 1.609 km; 1.000 km = 0.621 mi: Concurrency terminus; Incomplete access
