= Great Eastern Highway Bypass =

Highway in Perth, Western Australia

Great Eastern Highway Bypass Western Australia
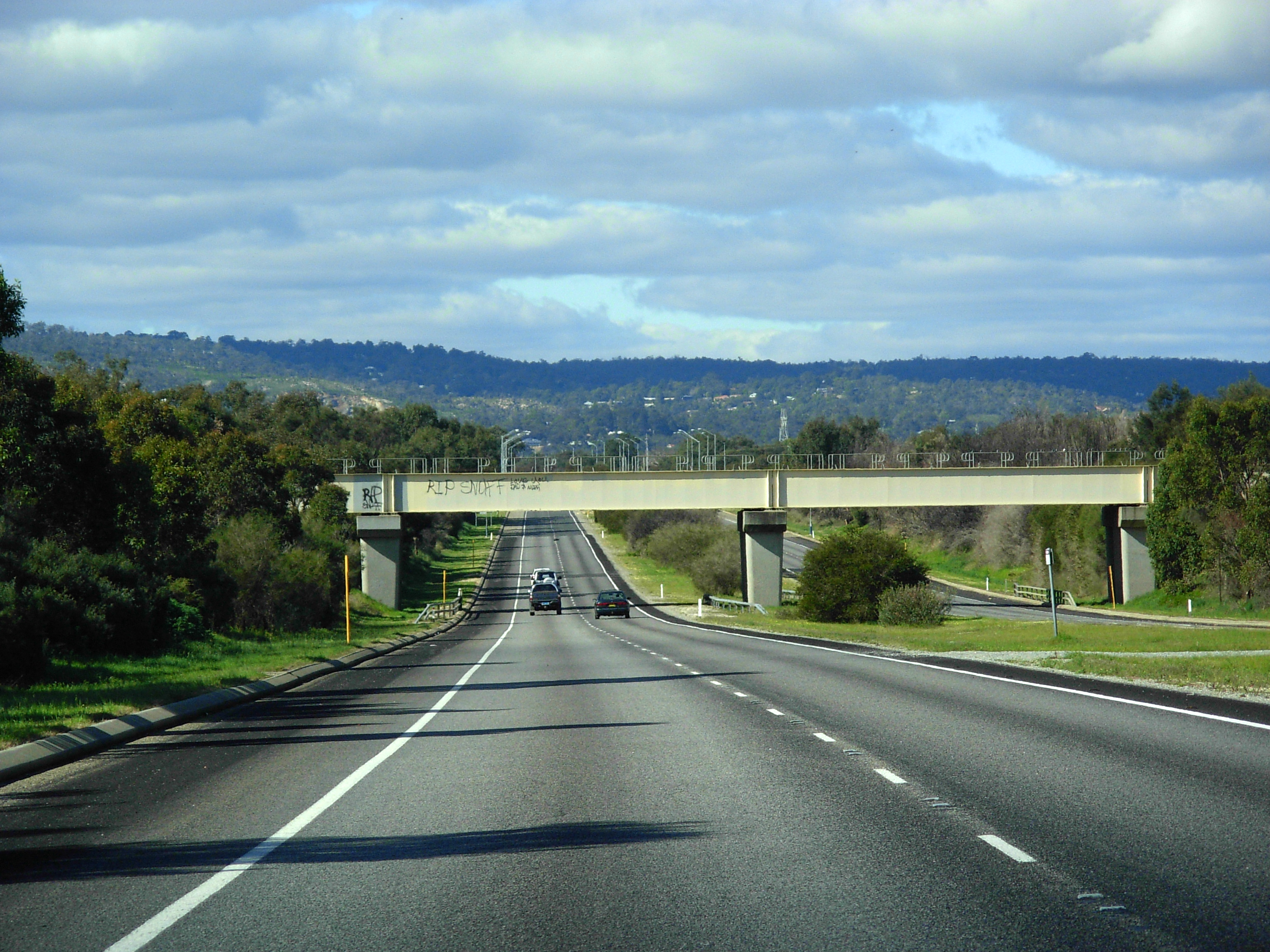
- Great Eastern Highway Bypass in Hazelmere looking east to the Darling Scarp

General information
- Type: Highway
- Length: 5.6 km (3.5 mi)
- Opened: 1988
- Route number(s): National Highway 94

Major junctions
- West end: Great Eastern Highway (National Highway 94 / National Route 1), South Guildford
- Kalamunda Road (State Route 41); Abernethy Road (State Route 55)
- East end: Roe Highway (National Highway 94 / State Route 3) Hazelmere

Highway system
- Highways in Australia; National Highway • Freeways in Australia; Highways in Western Australia

Great Eastern Highway Bypass is a limited-access dual carriageway linking Great Eastern Highway and Roe Highway in Perth, Western Australia. Together with a section of Roe Highway, it bypasses the historical Guildford and Midland localities, through which the original, urban and slower Great Eastern Highway passes.

== Route description ==
Great Eastern Highway Bypass begins at a traffic light controlled T Junction with Great Eastern Highway in South Guildford. Through traffic flows between Great Eastern Highway southwest of the intersection and the bypass to the east; access to the north-eastern section of Great Eastern Highway requires turning off the main route. The bypass proceeds around the northern edge of Perth Airport for 1.6 kilometres (0.99 mi) before encountering Kalamunda Road at a traffic light controlled intersection. Great Eastern Highway Bypass continues east, past residential development to the north, and mostly undeveloped industrial land to the south, before crossing into the industrial suburb of Hazelmere. After 2.7 kilometres (1.7 mi) there is a traffic light controlled T Junction with Abernethy Road, which travels in a south-westerly direction, parallel to the airport's eastern edge, connecting to the industrial areas of High Wycombe, Forrestfield and Kewdale. A further 650 metres (2,130 ft) takes the bypass to Stirling Crescent, a local road providing access to Hazelmere and High Wycombe, and the road ends at Roe Highway, 600 metres (2,000 ft) to the east. Both intersections are traffic light controlled. Northbound, Roe Highway leads back to Great Eastern Highway in Midvale, east of Midland. Southbound, the highway heads towards Armadale.

== History ==
Plans for a major highway along a similar alignment date back to Gordon Stephenson and Alistair Hepburn's 1955 "Plan for the Metropolitan Region", which was the precursor of Perth's Metropolitan Region Scheme. The first gazetted edition of the scheme shows it as a controlled access highway, extending west beyond Great Eastern Highway. The route crossed the Swan River and met a proposed north–south highway (now constructed and named Tonkin Highway), and followed the river to Perth's CBD, cutting across the Maylands and Burswood peninsulas. Such a route was still planned for in the 1970s and 1980s. The eastern section, corresponding to the current Great Eastern Highway Bypass, was constructed in the late 1980s, and was known as the Redcliffe–Bushmead Highway during construction. Great Eastern Highway Bypass was opened on 14 May 1988, after 21 months of construction, and at a cost of $10 million. The western continuation was not developed, and the route was not included in subsequent planning documents in the 1990s.

Currently, Great Eastern Highway Bypass is going in a major upgrade from Roe Highway to Abernethy Road. Both intersections will upgrade to a grade-separated interchange with Abernethy Road meeting up with Lloyd Street. The construction is expected to end by 2024.

== Intersections ==
The entire highway is in the City of Swan local government area, part of the Perth Metropolitan Region.

Location	km	mi	Destinations	Notes
South Guildford	0	0.0	Great Eastern Highway northeast (National Route 1) – Guildford, Swan Valley	Traffic light controlled T junction; Highway terminus: continues southwest as Great Eastern Highway (National Highway 94 / National Route 1)
South Guildford, Perth Airport	1.6	0.99	Kalamunda Road (State Route 41) – South Guildford, Kalamunda	Traffic light controlled junction.
Hazelmere	4.3	2.7	Abernethy Road (State Route 55) – Forrestfield, Kewdale	Traffic light controlled T junction. To be replaced with a Single-Point Urban interchange (SPUI) with construction to start in late 2021/early 2022.
Hazelmere	4.9	3.0	Stirling Crescent – Hazelmere, High Wycombe	Traffic light controlled junction. Will be eliminated with cul-de-sacs on the side roads.
Hazelmere	5.6	3.5	Roe Highway (National Highway 94 north / State Route 3) – Midland, Armadale	Highway terminus. Traffic light controlled T junction. To be replaced with a trumpet interchange with construction to start in late 2021/early 2022.
1.000 mi = 1.609 km; 1.000 km = 0.621 mi
