= Kalamunda Road =

Road in Perth, Western Australia

Coordinates: 31°57′40″S 116°02′31″E

Kalamunda Road Western Australia
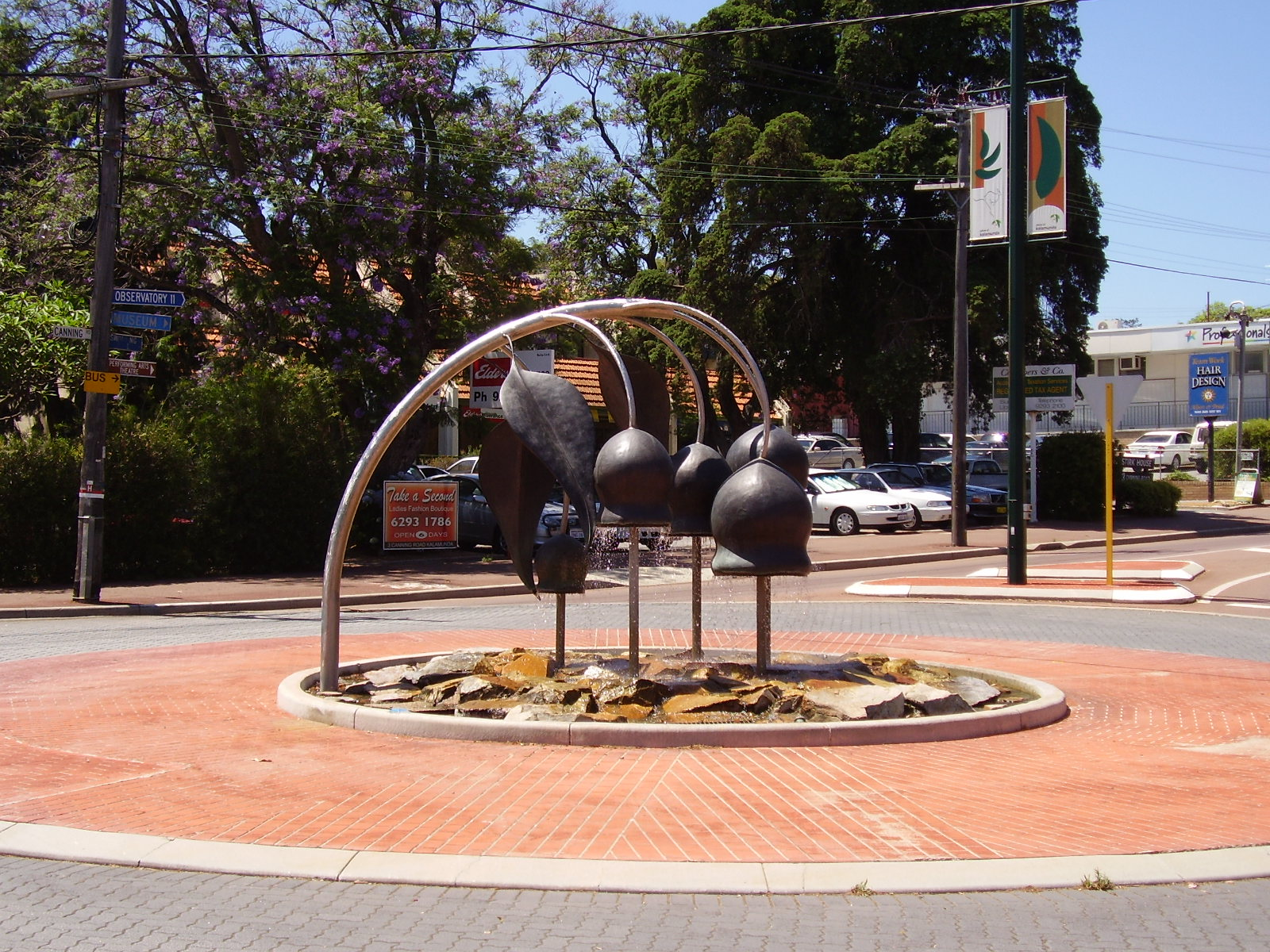
- Kalamunda Road at its terminus, in the Kalamunda town centre

General information
- Type: Road
- Length: 11 km (6.8 mi)
- Route number(s): State Route 41 (southeast of Roe Highway)

Major junctions
- Northwest end: Great Eastern Highway (National Route 1), South Guildford
- Great Eastern Highway Bypass (National Highway 94); Roe Highway (State Route 3)
- Southeast end: Canning Road (State Route 41), Kalamunda

Location(s)
- Major suburbs: Perth Airport, High Wycombe

Kalamunda Road is a minor arterial road linking the historic suburb of South Guildford with the Darling Scarp suburb of Kalamunda, in Perth, Western Australia.

It serves as a major access road for Perth Airport, and provides the foothills suburbs with access to the Perth central business district.

== Route ==
Beginning at the historical and now bypassed Great Eastern Highway in South Guildford, the road passes through a light industrial area, and meets the Great Eastern Highway Bypass, which provides access to Perth City and Midland.

It then passes by Perth Airport and Guildford Cemetery, before passing through the foothills suburbs of High Wycombe and Maida Vale. After meeting Roe Highway, it is allocated State Route 41, and is dual carriageway for this section between the highway and Hawtin Road. It then reverts to single carriageway and ascends the Darling Scarp. This section is colloquially known as Kalamunda Hill. It ends in the Kalamunda town centre.

== Major intersections ==
All of the below intersections are controlled by traffic lights unless otherwise indicated.

LGA	Location	km	mi	Destinations	Notes
Swan	South Guildford	0	0.0	Great Eastern Highway (National route 1) – Perth, Ascot, Guildford, Midland	Northern terminus at signalised T-intersection
Swan	South Guildford, Perth Airport boundary	1.0	0.62	Great Eastern Highway Bypass (National Highway 94) – Perth, Redcliffe, Hazelmere	
Kalamunda-Swan border	High Wycombe, Perth Airport boundary	3.6	2.2	Abernethy Road (State Route 55) – Belmont, Kewdale, Hazelmere	
Kalamunda	High Wycombe	4.9	3.0	Chipping Drive north / Newburn Road south	Roundabout
Kalamunda	High Wycombe, Maida Vale boundary	5.9– 6.2	3.7– 3.9	Roe Highway (State Route 3) – Midland, Welshpool, Fremantle, Armadale	Dogbone interchange with Roe Highway free-flowing, formerly a traffic light controlled intersection. State Route 41 northern concurrency terminus
Kalamunda	Maida Vale	7.5	4.7	Gooseberry Hill Road northeast / Hawtin Road southwest – Gooseberry Hill, Forrestfield	
Kalamunda	Kalamunda	10.9	6.8	Elizabeth Street northeast / Boonooloo Road southwest	Roundabout
Kalamunda	Kalamunda	11.4	7.1	Canning Road (State Route 41) south / Stirk Street east – Walliston, Lesmurdie	Southern terminus at roundabout.
1.000 mi = 1.609 km; 1.000 km = 0.621 mi: Concurrency terminus; Note: Intersections with minor local roads are not shown
