= Division of Swan =

Australian federal electoral division

Coordinates: 31.986°S 115.921°E

Swan Australian House of Representatives Division
- Interactive map of electorate boundaries from the 2025 federal election
- Created: 1901
- MP: Zaneta Mascarenhas
- Party: Labor
- Namesake: Swan River
- Electors: 121,335 (2022)
- Area: 134 km^{2} (51.7 sq mi)
- Demographic: Inner metropolitan
Electorates around Swan:
Perth	Hasluck	Hasluck
Perth	Swan	Bullwinkel
Tangney	Tangney	Burt

The Division of Swan is an Australian electoral division in the state of Western Australia.

Swan is a marginal electorate that has swung between both major political parties in the past two decades. It extends across the Swan River from central Perth, and covers most of the area between the Swan and Canning Rivers.

The seat includes a mix of incomes and housing types, from low-price flats to affluent suburbs with Swan River views. The electorate includes the campus of Curtin University, the Welshpool and Kewdale industrial areas, and Perth Airport. Swan covers 151 sq. kilometres.

The current MP is Zaneta Mascarenhas, a member of the Labor Party. She was first elected in the 2022 federal election.

== History ==
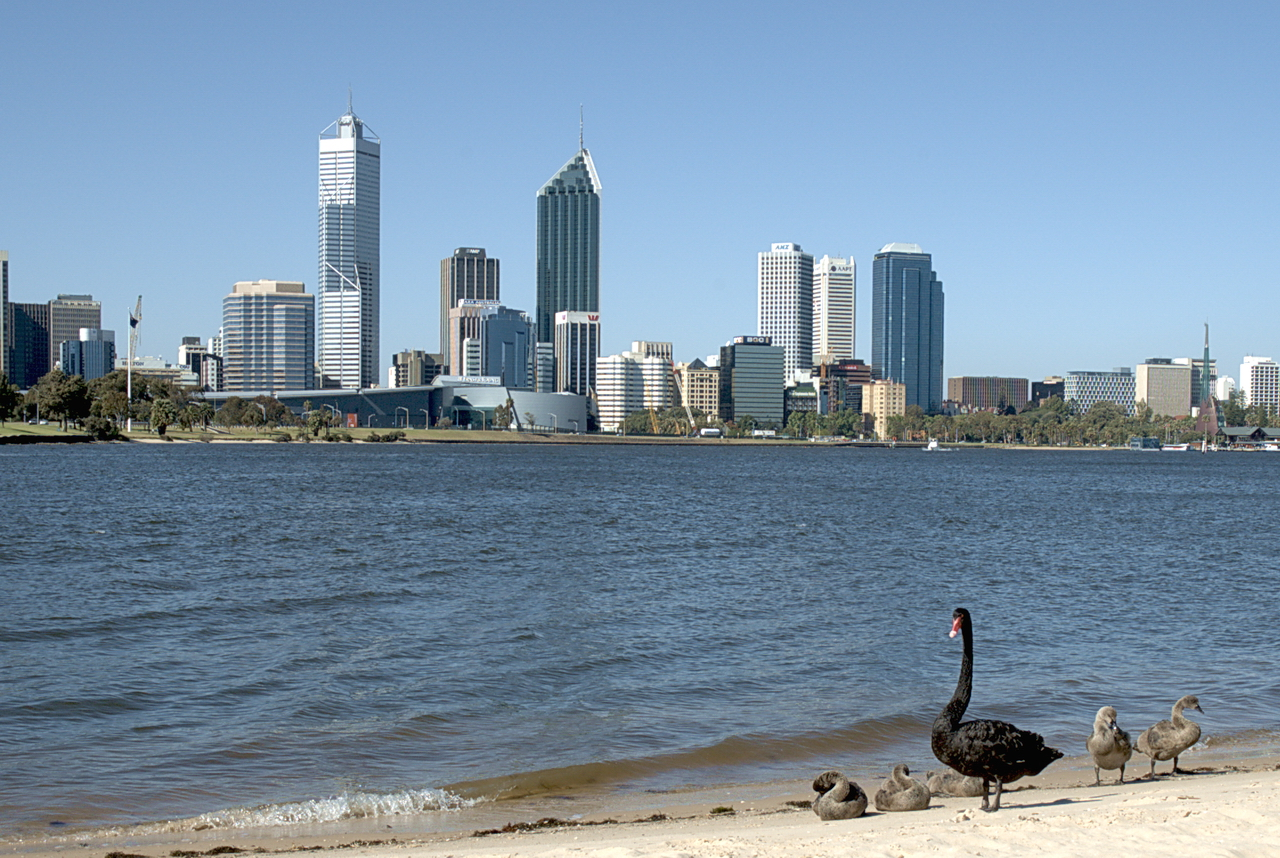
Swan River, the division's namesake

The division was one of the original 65 divisions contested at the first federal election in 1901. It was one of five electorates created by the Federal House of Representatives Western Australian Electorates Act 1900, an act of the parliament of Western Australia. The original bill introduced by Premier John Forrest provided for the seat to be named "Occidental" rather than Swan. Forrest himself would become the first member for Swan.

Historically, the electorate was a country seat extending north to Dongara, east to Merredin and south to the coast. It contracted to an area east of the Darling Range and became a safe Country Party seat. Prior to the 1949 election, its old area became the new seat of Moore, while Swan moved into approximately its present position, although initially extending as far north-east as Midland.

For several decades, Swan has continually been a marginal seat, extending along the Swan and Canning Rivers from the affluent suburbs in the City of South Perth to the west, which typically vote for the Liberal Party, to the City of Belmont to the east and parts of the City of Canning to the south-east, which are more working-class in orientation and typically vote for the Labor Party. From 2004 to 2007 it was the third most marginal electorate in Australia, after Hindmarsh and Kingston, with the ALP incumbent Kim Wilkie winning 50.08 percent of the two-party-preferred vote in 2004. A redistribution ahead of the 2010 election added the strongly Labor-voting suburb of Langford, which was previously within Tangney, which made it a notionally Labor seat. Langford was redistributed to Burt in 2016.

At the 2007 election, Liberal candidate Steve Irons won the seat with a swing of 0.19 percent. Irons was the only Coalition challenger to unseat a Labor incumbent at the 2007 election. However, the election came at a very bad time for the state Labor government, which was only polling at 49 percent support at the time the writs were dropped. Irons was re-elected with a slightly increased majority in 2010, making it a fairly safe Liberal seat. Following the 2016 election Labor candidate Tammy Solonec managed to return Swan to marginal status.

Steve Irons retained the seat in the 2019 election. Hannah Beazley contested the seat for Labor but ultimately conceded defeat. After Steve Iron's retirement at the 2022 Australian federal election, the seat was contested by Kristy McSweeney from the Liberal Party. She was defeated by Zaneta Mascarenhas from the Labor Party.

While the seat has moved clear of its original boundaries at federation, it has retained the name Swan, since the Australian Electoral Commission is required to preserve the names of original Federation seats where possible.

== Geography ==
Since 1984, federal electoral division boundaries in Australia have been determined at redistributions by a redistribution committee appointed by the Australian Electoral Commission. Redistributions occur for the boundaries of divisions in a particular state, and they occur every seven years, or sooner if a state's representation entitlement changes or when divisions of a state are malapportioned.

In August 2021, the Australian Electoral Commission (AEC) announced that Swan would lose the suburb of Wilson to the seat of Tangney and gain the suburbs of Maida Vale and Wattle Grove and the remainder of Forrestfield and High Wycombe from the seat of Hasluck. These boundary changes took place as of the 2022 election.

Swan is bordered by the Swan River in the north and west, the Canning River and the City of Canning in the south, and Roe Highway, Great Eastern Highway and Perth Airport in the east. Suburbs include:

=== City of Belmont ===
- Ascot
- Belmont
- Cloverdale
- Kewdale
- Perth Airport
- Redcliffe
- Rivervale

=== City of Canning ===
- Bentley
- Cannington
- East Cannington
- Queens Park
- St James
- Welshpool

=== City of Kalamunda ===
- Forrestfield
- High Wycombe
- Maida Vale
- Wattle Grove

=== City of South Perth ===
- Como
- Karawara
- Kensington
- Manning
- Salter Point
- South Perth
- Waterford

=== City of Swan ===
- South Guildford (part)

=== Town of Victoria Park ===
- Burswood
- Carlisle
- Lathlain
- East Victoria Park
- St James
- Victoria Park

== Members ==
Image	Member	Party	Term	Notes
	Sir John Forrest (1847–1918)	Protectionist	29 March 1901 – 26 May 1909	Previously held the Western Australian Legislative Assembly seat of Bunbury. Served as minister under Barton, Deakin, Cook and Hughes. Died in office
	Sir John Forrest (1847–1918)	Liberal	26 May 1909 – 17 February 1917	Previously held the Western Australian Legislative Assembly seat of Bunbury. Served as minister under Barton, Deakin, Cook and Hughes. Died in office
	Sir John Forrest (1847–1918)	Nationalist	17 February 1917 – 2 September 1918	Previously held the Western Australian Legislative Assembly seat of Bunbury. Served as minister under Barton, Deakin, Cook and Hughes. Died in office
	Edwin Corboy (1896–1950)	Labor	26 October 1918 – 13 December 1919	Lost seat. Later elected to the Western Australian Legislative Assembly seat of Yilgarn in 1921
	John Prowse (1871–1944)	Farmers and Settlers' Association	13 December 1919 – 24 February 1920	Transferred to the Division of Forrest
	John Prowse (1871–1944)	Country	24 February 1920 – 16 December 1922	Transferred to the Division of Forrest
	Henry Gregory (1860–1940)	Country	16 December 1922 – 15 November 1940	Previously held the Division of Dampier. Died in office
	Thomas Marwick (1895–1960)	Country	21 December 1940 – 21 August 1943	Previously a member of the Senate. Lost seat
	Don Mountjoy (1906–1988)	Labor	21 August 1943 – 28 September 1946	Lost seat
	Len Hamilton (1899–1987)	Country	28 September 1946 – 10 December 1949	Transferred to the Division of Canning
	Bill Grayden (1920–2026)	Liberal	10 December 1949 – 29 May 1954	Previously held the Western Australian Legislative Assembly seat of Middle Swan. Lost seat. Later elected to the Western Australian Legislative Assembly seat of South Perth in 1956. Oldest living former member of the House of Representatives until his death.
	Harry Webb (1908–2000)	Labor	29 May 1954 – 10 December 1955	Transferred to the Division of Stirling
	Richard Cleaver (1917–2006)	Liberal	10 December 1955 – 25 October 1969	Lost seat
	Adrian Bennett (1933–2006)	Labor	25 October 1969 – 13 December 1975	Lost seat
	John Martyr (1932–2021)	Liberal	13 December 1975 – 18 October 1980	Lost seat. Later appointed to the Senate in 1981
	Kim Beazley (1948–)	Labor	18 October 1980 – 2 March 1996	Served as minister under Hawke and Keating. Served as Deputy Prime Minister under Keating. Transferred to the Division of Brand
	Don Randall (1953–2015)	Liberal	2 March 1996 – 3 October 1998	Lost seat. Later elected to the Division of Canning in 2001
	Kim Wilkie (1959–)	Labor	3 October 1998 – 24 November 2007	Lost seat
	Steve Irons (1958–)	Liberal	24 November 2007 – 11 April 2022	Retired
	Zaneta Mascarenhas (1980–)	Labor	21 May 2022 – present	Incumbent

== Election results ==
2025 Australian federal election: Swan
Party	Candidate	Votes	%	±%
Labor	Zaneta Mascarenhas	41,897	42.63	+2.58
Liberal	Mic Fels	26,467	26.93	−4.69
Greens	Clint Uink	17,186	17.49	+2.41
One Nation	Michael Halley	5,131	5.22	+2.74
Legalise Cannabis	Shelley Leech	4,096	4.17	+4.17
Christians	Mark Staer	3,503	3.56	+1.49
Total formal votes		98,280	96.93	+2.02
Informal votes		3,114	3.07	−2.02
Turnout		101,394	87.33	−0.05
Two-party-preferred result
Labor	Zaneta Mascarenhas	62,888	63.99	+4.56
Liberal	Mic Fels	35,392	36.01	−4.56
Labor hold		Swing	+4.56	
