= Perth Airport (suburb) =

- Suburb
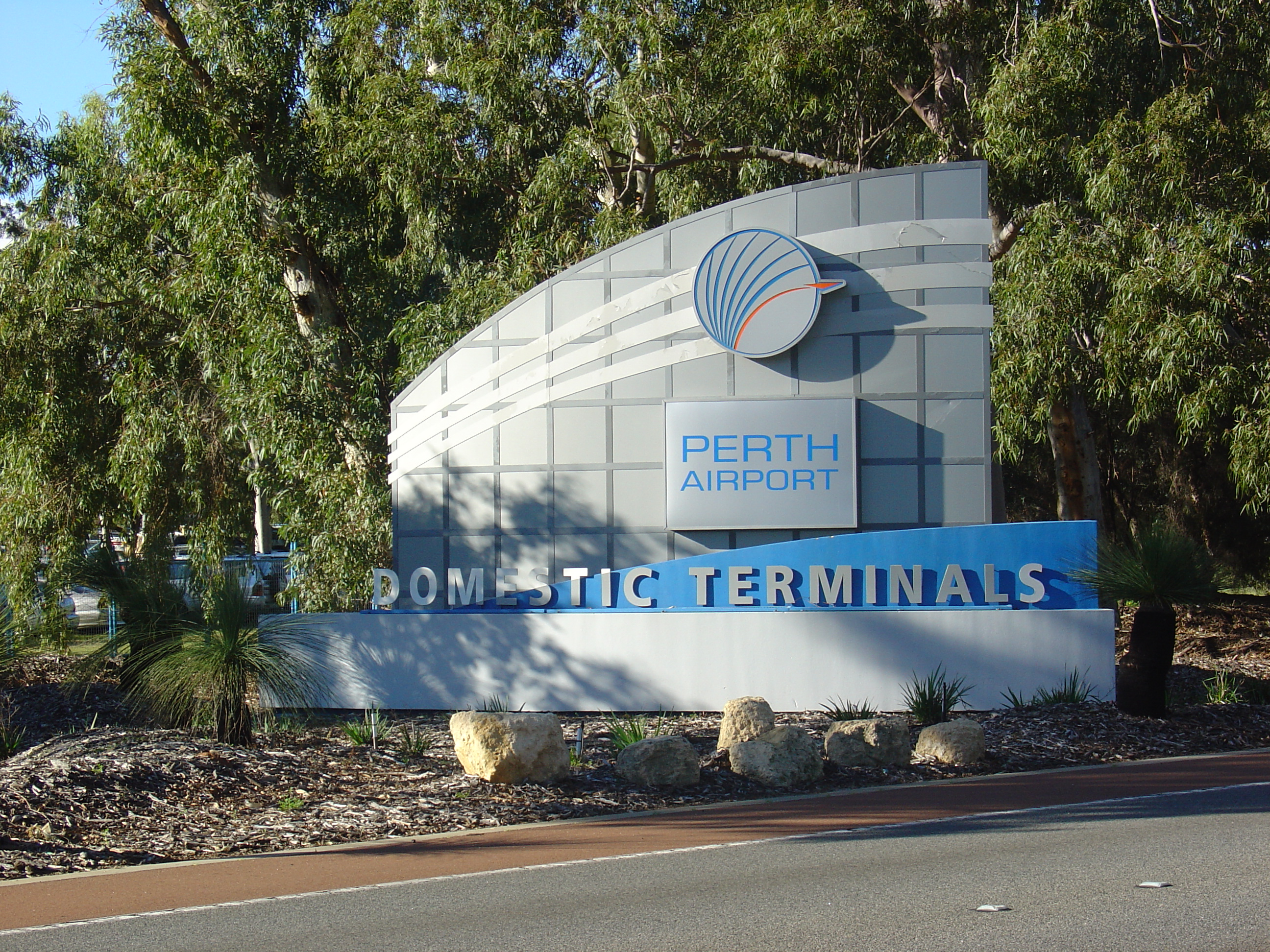
- Former entry signage to terminals 3 and 4 at Perth Airport
- Interactive map of Perth Airport
- Coordinates: 31.944°S 115.968°E
- Country: Australia
- State: Western Australia
- City: Perth
- LGAs: City of Belmont; City of Swan; City of Kalamunda
- Location: 12 km (7.5 mi) from Perth
- Established: 1997

Government
  - State electorate: Belmont
  - Federal division: Swan

Population
  - Total: 25 (SAL 2021)
- Postcode: 6105
Suburbs around Perth Airport
Redcliffe	South Guildford	High Wycombe
Cloverdale	Perth Airport	Maida Vale
Kewdale	Welshpool	Forrestfield

Perth Airport is an eastern suburb of Perth, the capital city of Western Australia. Its local government areas are the City of Belmont, the City of Swan (north) and the City of Kalamunda (east). It is located approximately 12 km east of the central business district.

The suburb is the home of Perth Airport, the main international airport of Perth. It also features a number of commercial and industrial properties including two shopping centres (DFO Perth and Dunreath Village), a Costco, distribution centres for Australia Post, Coles Supermarkets and Foodbank Australia, and the Perth Mint refinery. The Royal Automobile Club of Western Australia operated a purpose-built driver training facility at Perth Airport between 2004 and 2016; at the time it was the only one of its kind in the state.

The Perth Airport estate's status as Commonwealth-owned land makes retail businesses there exempt from Western Australia's metropolitan retail trading hour rules. For example, as of January 2026, Woolworths at Dunreath Village is able to operate weekdays from 5am to 10pm, with potential to extend that to 24 hours contingent on customer demand, in contrast to the 8am to 9pm weekday trading hours as set by state legislation.

== History ==
Perth Airport was approved as a locality name on 25 June 1984. Part of the area east of Redcliffe was previously known as Newburn, a suburb that was established in 1950 and had been the site of Red Gum Forest, a small farming community from 1912. Much of the suburb of Newburn was bought by the federal government for the airport in 1970, doubling the airport's size, and Newburn is now completely subsumed into the suburb of Perth Airport. There was also a small suburb called Dunreath in the area that was subdivided as Dunreath Estate in 1931, became a Women's Auxiliary Australian Air Force training camp during World War II, and then became a hostel for post-war migrants from Mainland Europe known as "New Australians" or "Displaced persons".

== Transport ==
=== Road ===
Perth Airport is bounded by Tonkin Highway to its south and south-west. The main access route to terminals 1 and 2 (and the future consolidated terminal precinct) is via Airport Drive, with access to terminals 3 and 4 as well as DFO Perth and Dunreath Village via Dunreath Drive. Another major road is Horrie Miller Drive, which provides access to commercial and industrial properties in the suburb's south.

=== Bus ===
- 36 Airport Central Station to Cannington Station – serves Horrie Miller Drive
- 37 Airport Central Station to Curtin University Bus Station – serves Horrie Miller Drive
- 270 High Wycombe Station to Elizabeth Quay Bus Station – serves Abernethy Road
- 278 High Wycombe Station to Midland Station – serves Kalamunda Road and Abernethy Road
- 290 and 291 Redcliffe Station to Midland Station – serve Dunreath Drive and Fauntleroy Avenue
- 292 Redcliffe Station to Redcliffe Station – Circular Route, serves Dunreath Drive, Fauntleroy Avenue and Snook Road
- 293 Redcliffe Station to High Wycombe Station – serves Abernethy Road
- 294 Foodbank Western Australia to High Wycombe Station – serves Abbott Road
- 940 Redcliffe Station to Elizabeth Quay Bus Station (high frequency) – serves Dunreath Drive and Fauntleroy Avenue

=== Rail ===
- Airport Line
  - Airport Central Station

== Climate ==
Perth Airport is home to a Bureau of Meteorology weather station. Perth Airport has a Mediterranean climate (Köppen climate classification Csa), like the rest of Perth. The highest recorded temperature in the Perth metropolitan region is 46.7 °C (116.1 °F), recorded at Perth Airport on 23 February 1991.

Climate data for Perth Airport
Month	Jan	Feb	Mar	Apr	May	Jun	Jul	Aug	Sep	Oct	Nov	Dec	Year
Record high °C (°F)	46.0 (114.8)	46.7 (116.1)	43.8 (110.8)	39.6 (103.3)	35.3 (95.5)	27.8 (82.0)	25.7 (78.3)	29.9 (85.8)	34.5 (94.1)	37.7 (99.9)	41.1 (106.0)	44.5 (112.1)	46.7 (116.1)
Mean maximum °C (°F)	41.0 (105.8)	40.4 (104.7)	38.6 (101.5)	33.2 (91.8)	28.4 (83.1)	23.5 (74.3)	22.1 (71.8)	23.9 (75.0)	27.2 (81.0)	32.2 (90.0)	36.2 (97.2)	39.3 (102.7)	42.1 (107.8)
Mean daily maximum °C (°F)	31.8 (89.2)	32.0 (89.6)	29.7 (85.5)	25.6 (78.1)	21.8 (71.2)	19.0 (66.2)	18.0 (64.4)	18.6 (65.5)	20.2 (68.4)	22.8 (73.0)	26.1 (79.0)	29.1 (84.4)	24.6 (76.3)
Mean daily minimum °C (°F)	17.0 (62.6)	17.5 (63.5)	16.0 (60.8)	13.0 (55.4)	10.4 (50.7)	9.0 (48.2)	8.0 (46.4)	8.1 (46.6)	8.9 (48.0)	10.3 (50.5)	12.8 (55.0)	15.0 (59.0)	12.2 (54.0)
Mean minimum °C (°F)	10.4 (50.7)	11.1 (52.0)	8.9 (48.0)	6.4 (43.5)	4.4 (39.9)	2.9 (37.2)	2.3 (36.1)	2.6 (36.7)	3.4 (38.1)	4.6 (40.3)	6.9 (44.4)	8.7 (47.7)	1.2 (34.2)
Record low °C (°F)	6.0 (42.8)	5.7 (42.3)	3.1 (37.6)	1.2 (34.2)	−0.4 (31.3)	−1.3 (29.7)	−1.0 (30.2)	0.1 (32.2)	−0.2 (31.6)	1.2 (34.2)	3.2 (37.8)	4.8 (40.6)	−1.3 (29.7)
Average rainfall mm (inches)	10.9 (0.43)	15.0 (0.59)	16.2 (0.64)	39.7 (1.56)	97.5 (3.84)	155.1 (6.11)	155.3 (6.11)	118.9 (4.68)	72.2 (2.84)	43.0 (1.69)	25.4 (1.00)	11.2 (0.44)	762.1 (30.00)
Average precipitation days	2.5	2.8	3.9	7.3	12.1	16.1	17.5	15.7	13.2	9.3	6.4	3.9	110.7
Average afternoon relative humidity (%) (at 15:00)	37	37	39	46	53	60	60	56	54	49	44	41	48
Mean daily sunshine hours	11.5	11.0	9.5	8.1	6.9	6.0	6.1	7.1	7.8	9.6	10.8	11.5	8.8
Source: Bureau of Meteorology; Temperatures and rain data: 1944–2020; Relative humidity: 1994–2010
