= Bushmead, Western Australia =

Bushmead
- Suburb
- Interactive map of Bushmead
- Coordinates: 31.925712°S 116.028036°E
- Country: Australia
- State: Western Australia
- City: Perth
- LGA: City of Swan
- Established: 2017

Government
  - State electorate: Midland
  - Federal division: Bullwinkel

Population
  - Total: 677 (SAL 2021)
- Postcode: 6055
Suburbs around Bushmead
Hazelmere	Helena Valley	Helena Valley
Hazelmere	Bushmead	Gooseberry Hill
High Wycombe	Maida Vale	Gooseberry Hill

Bushmead is a suburb of Perth in the City of Swan, and is located 16 kilometres (10 mi) from Perth's central business district. Situated on the site of the former Bushmead Rifle Range, a significant proportion of the suburb comprises parks and recreational reserve. Advertising by the developer, who bought the land for A$6.59 per square metre in 2010 from the Department of Defence on behalf of the Commonwealth of Australia, states that "185 hectares [460 acres] of conservation bushland will be handed to the State Government as a permanent regional reserve."

== History ==
The suburb is situated in the part of Noongar traditional Aboriginal country where the Whadjuk people are the local custodians. Its name Bushmead is from mapping of the area in 1893, with title deeds showing Bushmead as part of the Woodbridge estate. The land had previously been owned by the Department of Defence after it was acquired in 1915. It was an important location on the Upper Darling Range railway, being south of the end of the Midland Railway yards complex and associated sidings and infrastructure, and the beginning of the climb on the Kalamunda Zig Zag.

A plaque was unveiled at an opening ceremony for the suburb of Bushmead in June 2017, by the Member for Midland Michelle Roberts and Cedar Woods developer Chairman Bill Hames.

== Transport ==
=== Bus ===
- 277 Midland Station to High Wycombe Station – serves Midland Road
- 307 Midland Station to Kalamunda bus station – serves Broadmeadows Drive
