= Hazelmere, Western Australia =

Hazelmere Perth, Western Australia
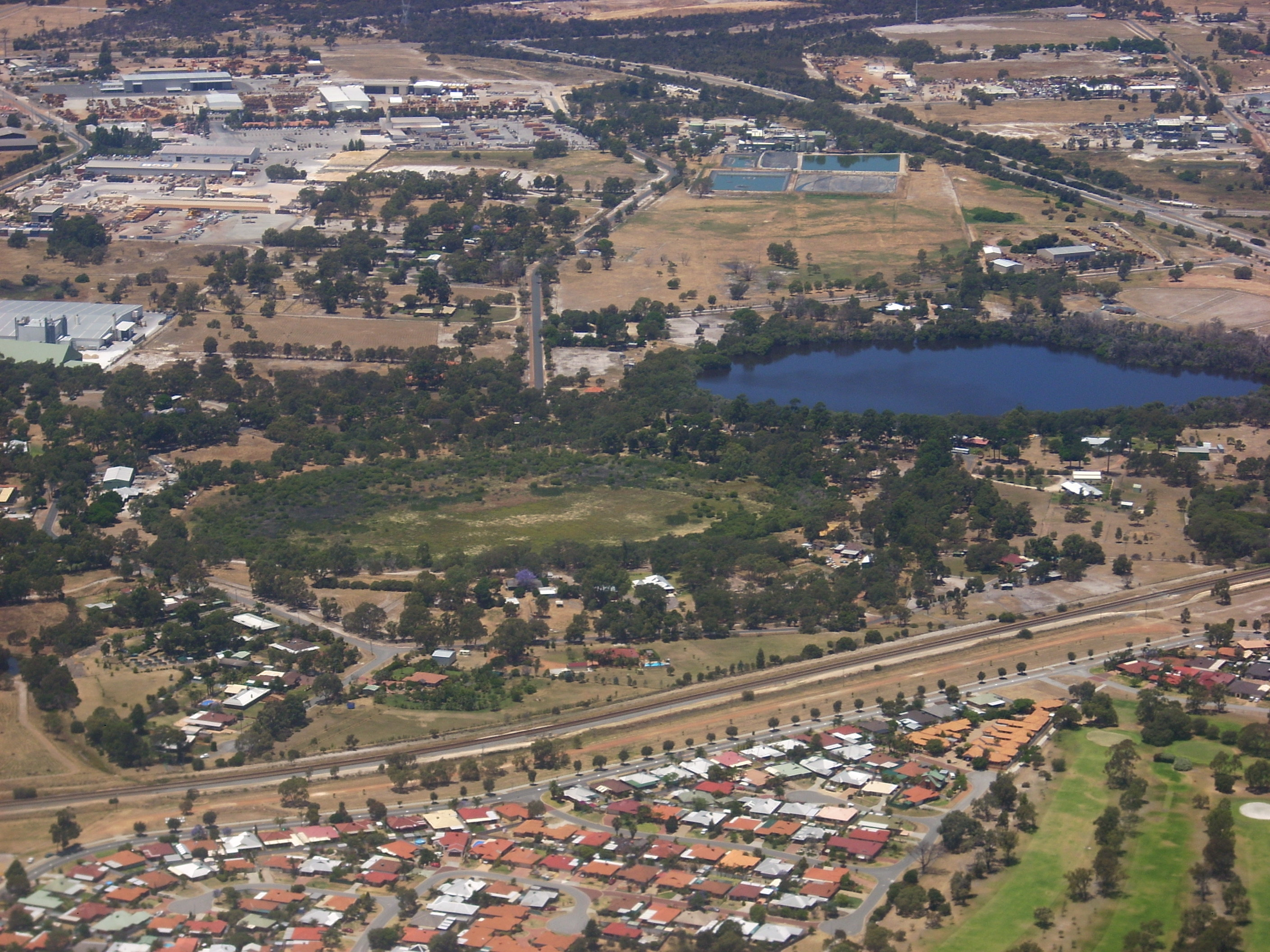
- Hazelmere lakes in foreground, Great Eastern Highway Bypass in upper right
- Coordinates: 31.901°S 115.922°E
- Population: 935 (SAL 2021)
- Postcode(s): 6055
- LGA(s): City of Swan
- State electorate(s): Belmont; Midland
- Federal division(s): Bullwinkel
Suburbs around Hazelmere:
Woodbridge	Midland	Helena Valley
Guildford	Hazelmere	Bushmead
South Guildford	High Wycombe	Maida Vale

Hazelmere is a suburb of Perth, 14 kilometres (9 mi) east of the Perth central business district, in the City of Swan. Bordered by Roe Highway to the east, and the Great Eastern Highway Bypass to the south, Hazelmere is at the northern edge of Perth Airport land.

== History ==
Hazelmere is part of the Woodbridge land grant given to Captain James Stirling in 1829. When a Guildford auctioneer bought the land in 1883, he subdivided the property into smaller lots, and one was named Hazelmere after the English town of Haslemere near Guildford, Surrey.

Formerly an extensive rural buffer between Midland and the airport it now consists of a mix of residential land at the Guildford end, rural land in the center and industrial land to the east.

== Bushmead rifle range ==
The former Commonwealth-owned land of the Bushmead rifle range that bordered on the formation of the former Upper Darling Range railway was sold in 2010 to property developer Cedar Woods Properties Limited – more specifically its subsidy Dunlan Property Pty Ltd, and excised as the new suburb Bushmead. (Note: The 273-hectare (670-acre) site was sold by the Department of Defence on behalf of the Commonwealth of Australia via a public tender process to Cedar Woods' wholly owned subsidiary Dunland Property Pty Ltd for A$18 million, which equates to A$6.59 per square metre. Once developed, residential land may be expected to sell at around A$500,000 per 700-square-metre block, equating to A$714.29 per square metre. Settlement was in July 2010.)

== Rezoning of residential areas ==
The strategic location of the residential lots in Hazelmere is considered by the City of Swan to be appropriate for higher density housing, and as a result a number of lots are currently under consideration for increased zoning. The rezoning of lots to the upper coding of R25 or R35 is considered appropriate due to the location of the Hazelmere lots that are located between 1 and 1.5 kilometres (0.62 and 0.93 mi) from the Woodbridge and East Guildford railway stations, and are within 2 kilometres (1.2 mi) of the strategic metropolitan centre of Midland.

The location of the lots that are proposed to be rezoned include the area generally bounded by Bushmead Road, Stirling Crescent, Eric Street and Wingate Avenue. Also included are lots on the east side of Wingate Avenue, lots fronting Mary Street and Anthea Street and the freight rail line to the west. The City of Swan have prepared two maps that show the current and proposed zoning respectively.

== Transport ==
=== Bus ===
- 277 Midland Station to High Wycombe Station – serves Midland Road
- 278 Midland Station to High Wycombe Station – serves Bushmead Road and Stirling Crescent
- 291 Midland Station to Redcliffe Station – serves Stirling Crescent, Robertson Street and West Parade

== See also ==
- Helena Valley, Western Australia
