= Cloverdale, Western Australia =

Cloverdale Perth, Western Australia
- Coordinates: 31.960°S 115.945°E
- Population: 8,864 (SAL 2021)
- Established: 1954
- Postcode(s): 6105
- Area: 3.9 km^{2} (1.5 sq mi)
- Location: 10 km (6 mi) from Perth
- LGA(s): City of Belmont
- State electorate(s): Belmont
- Federal division(s): Swan
Suburbs around Cloverdale:
Belmont	Redcliffe	Perth Airport
Rivervale	Cloverdale	Perth Airport
Kewdale	Kewdale	Kewdale

Cloverdale is a suburb of Perth, the capital city of Western Australia, 10 kilometres (6 mi) east of Perth's CBD in the City of Belmont.

== History ==
The name was from "Cloverdale Park", and "Cloverdale Estate", a subdivision in the area advertised for sale in 1910. It was officially recognised as a suburb name in 1954.

== Demography ==
In the 2006 census, Cloverdale had a population of 6,457. Cloverdale residents had a median age of 37, a year above the state average, and median individual incomes were below-average for the Perth metropolitan area — $414 per week compared with $513 per week. In the 2006 census, 4.37% of residents identified as Indigenous Australians. The suburb had a Decile 3 socioeconomic rating and a SEIFA index of 934.

== Geography ==
Cloverdale is approximately diamond-shaped, and represents the eastern quarter of Belmont's main residential area. It is bounded by Belmont Avenue to the southwest, Sydenham Street to the northwest, Epsom Avenue to the northeast, Tonkin Highway (Route 4) to the east and Leach Highway (Route 7) to the southeast. Abernethy Road (Route 55) runs northwest to southeast through the suburb.

== Land use ==
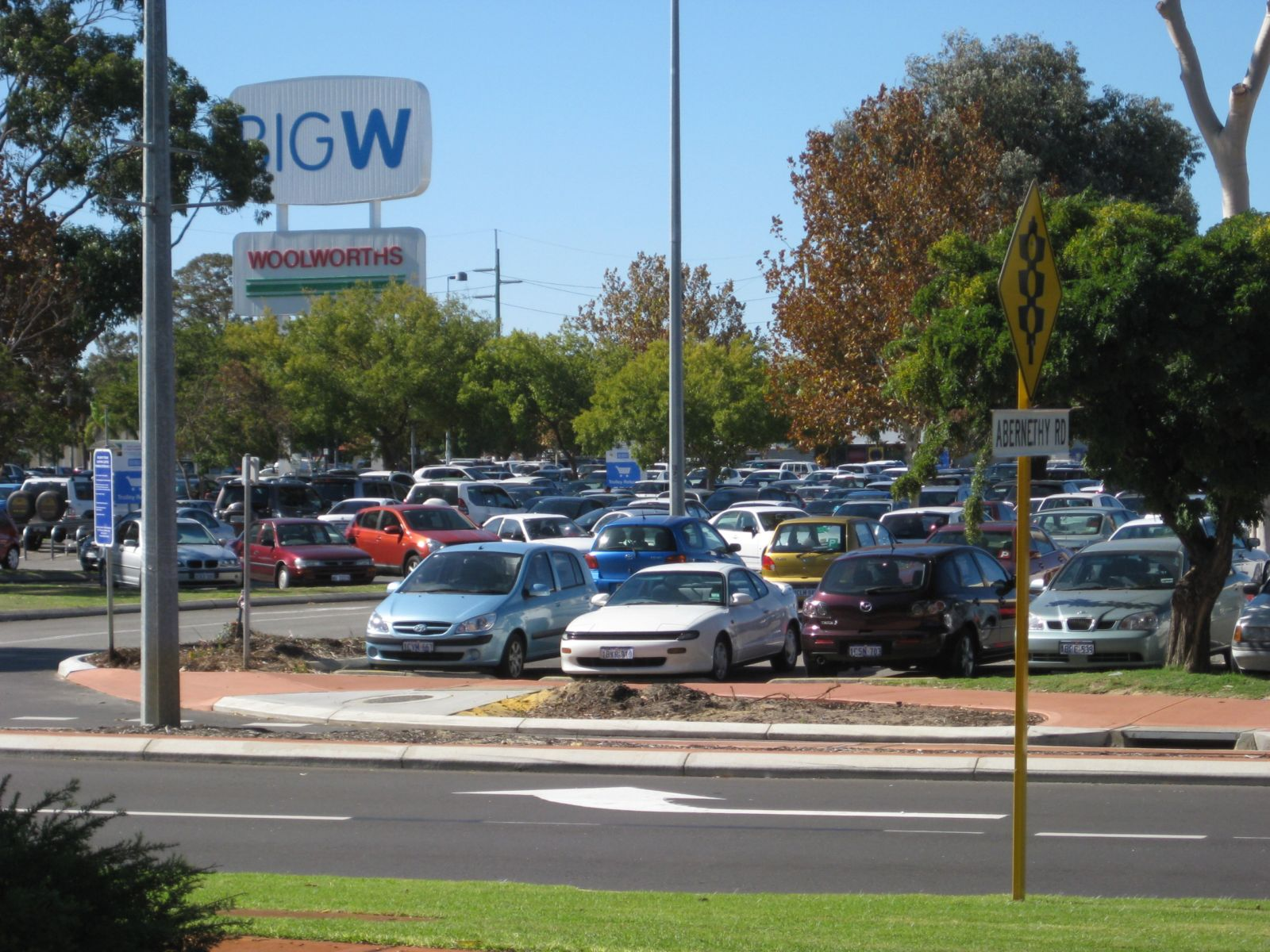
Belmont Forum

The suburb is almost completely residential. However, its boundaries take in a commercial and civic area on the western side. The main feature here is Belmont Forum, a regional shopping centre with 142 stores which first opened in 1974, and a smaller neighbouring centre Belmont Village which contains a Reading Cinema and the Belmont Tavern. Opposite the centre in Faulkner Park is a civic area containing the City of Belmont's council offices as well as a library, museum and a senior citizens centre. Small shops consisting of no more than two or three retailers are dotted through the suburb.

Cloverdale contains no industrial areas, although Perth Airport is immediately to the east beyond Tonkin Highway, and on the other side of Leach Highway, is the Kewdale industrial area which is one of Perth's largest. "Technicians and trade workers" were the biggest proportion of Cloverdale's workers in the 2006 ABS Census (18.2%); workers, labourers and machinery operators, and drivers were also high on the list.

== Facilities ==
A number of schools, parks and community facilities are located in Cloverdale.

The Cloverdale and Belmay state primary schools can be found here, as well as Notre Dame Primary School, a Catholic school. Another school, Whiteside Primary, used to service the eastern part of the suburb but the school was closed in 1997, and the land sold off by the state government to build housing. The nearest high school, to the suburb's northwest, is Belmont City College.

Three community centres are located in Cloverdale, the City of Belmont Youth and Family Centre, Miles Park Community Centre, and Forster Hall, as well as a recreation centre near Belmont Oval. Belmont Oval has facilities for lawn bowls and tennis as well as a soccer pitch and dog exercise area. Gerry Archer Athletic Centre, next to the oval, caters for all athletic events and has a 400-metre grassed running track. Numerous other small parks, most of them named, are scattered through Cloverdale but they are for the most part simply grassed areas with no distinguishing features.

== Transport ==
The suburb is connected to the rest of Perth's metropolitan area by two routes - Leach Highway, which links to Tonkin Highway, Bayswater/Morley, Forrestfield and the Perth Airport; and Abernethy Road which links to Great Eastern Highway in the direction of Perth CBD.

Cloverdale is served by Transperth buses operated by Path Transit. A small bus transfer stop at Belmont Forum is host to several bus routes including the 998-999 CircleRoute and various other routes. Routes 39 and 935 travel to Redcliffe Station along various streets while the 270 and 293 routes service Abernethy Road travelling to High Wycombe Station. The 37 bus route travels through between Perth Airport Terminal 1-2 and Oats Street Station on weekdays. Route 284 is a scarcer service proving a connection to Curtin University, while route 285 provides an early morning connection to the Kewdale Industrial Area. The nearest train stations linked by bus are Carlisle (38 & 284), Oats Street (37, 998 & 999), Redcliffe (39, 293 & 935), Airport Central (37) and High Wycombe (270 & 293).

=== Bus ===
- 38 Cloverdale to Perth Busport – serves Plant Lane, Kew Street, Belgravia Street and Wright Street
- 39 Redcliffe Station to Elizabeth Quay Bus Station – serves Epsom Avenue, Orpington Street, Hardey Road, Gabriel Street, Belgravia Street, Fulham Street and Belmont Avenue
- 284 Belmont Forum to Curtin University Bus Station – serves Wright Street, Abernethy Road, Fulham Street and Belmont Avenue
- 293 Redcliffe Station to High Wycombe Station – serves Abernethy Road
- 998 Fremantle Station to Fremantle Station (limited stops) – CircleRoute Clockwise, serves Hardey Road and Wright Street
- 999 Fremantle Station to Fremantle Station (limited stops) – CircleRoute Anti-Clockwise, serves Wright Street and Hardey Road

Bus routes serving Belmont Avenue, Wright Street and Abernethy Road:

- 37 Curtin University Bus Station to Airport Central Station
- 270 Elizabeth Quay Bus Station to High Wycombe Station
- 935 Kings Park to Redcliffe Station (high frequency)
