= Belmont, Western Australia =

Belmont
- Suburb
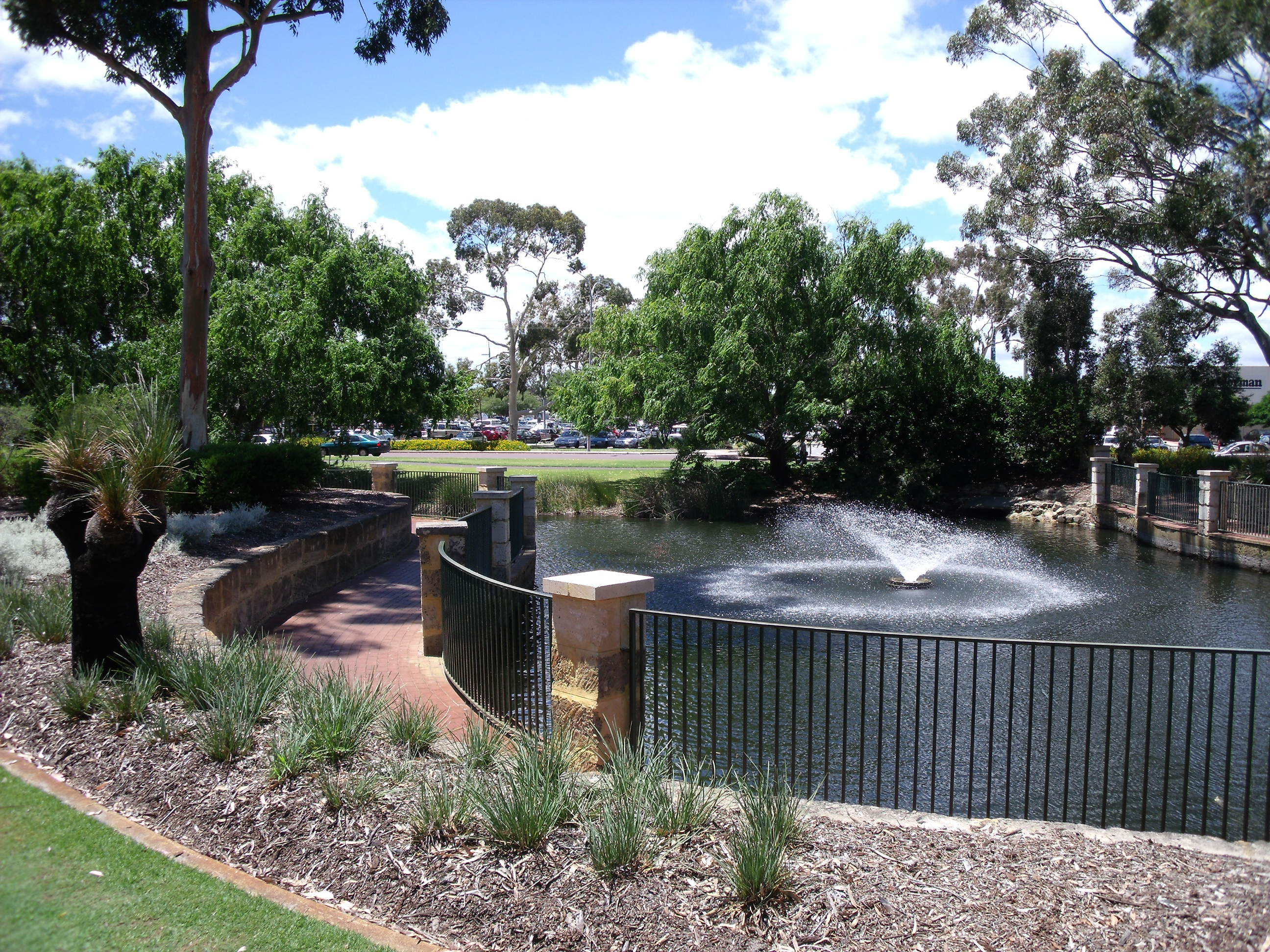
- Interactive map of Belmont
- Coordinates: 31.945°S 115.927°E
- Country: Australia
- State: Western Australia
- City: Perth
- LGA: City of Belmont
- Location: 9 km (5.6 mi) E of Perth

Government
  - State electorate: Belmont
  - Federal division: Swan

Area
  - Total: 4.4 km^{2} (1.7 sq mi)

Population
  - Total: 6,959 (SAL 2021)
- Postcode: 6104
Suburbs around Belmont
Maylands	Ascot	Redcliffe
Rivervale	Belmont	Cloverdale
Rivervale	Kewdale	Cloverdale

Belmont is a suburb of Perth, Western Australia, seven kilometres east of the central business district on the southern bank of the Swan River. Its local government area is the City of Belmont.

The suburb, part of a land grant assigned to Captain Francis Henry Byrne in 1831, was believed to have been named Belmont after Byrne's estate in England. The land was purchased by Shepherd Smith of Sydney in 1882, who subdivided it in 1897–1898.

The local government body based in Belmont was originally known as the Belmont Park Road Board.

The suburb was known as Belmont Park until being renamed in 1968.

Today, the suburb is mixed-use in character. The western part of the suburb is primarily industrial and commercial, while the east and north are more residential, with various motels and other accommodation along Great Eastern Highway, which forms the suburb's north-western boundary. It contains two public schools—Belmont Primary School, and Belmont City College (formerly Belmont Senior High School)—as well as Centenary Park, Signal Hill Bushland, the Belgravia Residential Estate and a 500-metre (1,600 ft) section on the south bank of the Swan River.

Belmont possesses a sister city partnership with Adachi, Tokyo in Japan, which has been in place since October 1984.

== Transport ==
=== Bus ===
Belmont is served by the following Transperth bus routes:

- 39: Redcliffe station to Elizabeth Quay bus station – serves Epsom Avenue
- 270: to Elizabeth Quay bus station to High Wycombe station – serves Belmont Avenue
- 293: Redcliffe station to High Wycombe Station – serves Epsom Avenue, Great Eastern Highway, Belgravia Street, Fairbrother Street and Abernethy Road
- 935: Redcliffe station to Kings Park – serves Epsom Avenue, Belvidere Street, Hardey Road, Alexander Road, Abernethy Road and Belmont Avenue
- 940: Redcliffe station to Elizabeth Quay bus station – serves Great Eastern Highway
- 998: Fremantle station to Fremantle station (limited stops) – CircleRoute clockwise, serves Hardey Road
- 999: Fremantle station to Fremantle station (limited stops) – CircleRoute anti-clockwise, serves Hardey Road

== Rail ==
A 1.6 kilometre branch line branching off the Eastern Railway at Bayswater was opened in 1885 by the Western Australian Government Railways to serve Ascot Racecourse. It closed in June 1956. The Mills Pottery Works had 2 ft gauge tramway that ran to a jetty on the Swan River. It had closed by 1929.
