= City of Belmont =

Coordinates: 31°56′42″S 115°55′37″E

- Local government area
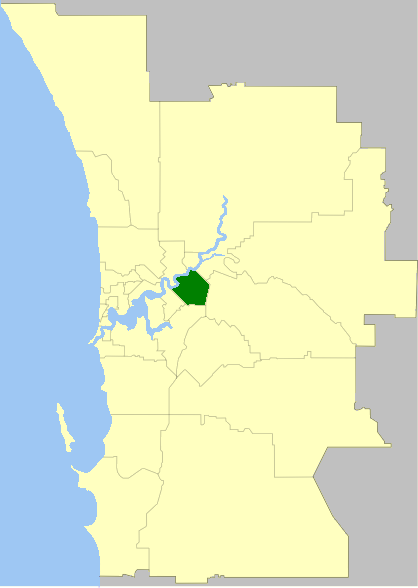
- The City of Belmont within the Perth Metropolitan Area

- Interactive map of City of Belmont
- Country: Australia
- State: Western Australia
- Region: Perth Metropolitan Region
- Established: 1898
- Council seat: Belmont

Government
  - Mayor: Robert Rossi
  - State electorate: Belmont
  - Federal division: Swan

Area
  - Total: 39.8 km^{2} (15.4 sq mi)

Population
  - Total: 42,257 (LGA 2021)
- Website: City of Belmont
LGAs around City of Belmont
Bayswater	Bassendean	Swan
Victoria Park	City of Belmont	Kalamunda
Victoria Park	Canning	Kalamunda

The City of Belmont is a local government area in the inner eastern suburbs of the Western Australian capital city of Perth, located about 8 kilometres (5 mi) east of Perth's central business district on the south bank of the Swan River. The City covers an area of 39.8 square kilometres (15.4 sq mi), maintains 225 km of roads and had a population of approximately 42,000 as at the 2021 Census.

Belmont contains Perth's domestic and international airports which account for 33.7% of the City of Belmont's land area.

== History ==
The Belmont Road District was created on 2 December 1898. On 4 October 1907, it was renamed Belmont Park. From 1906 until 1909, Burswood Island was part of the district.

On 1 July 1961, the Belmont Park Road District became the Shire of Belmont following the enactment of the Local Government Act 1960. On 17 February 1979 it attained city status.

Ascot and Belmont are suburbs long associated with horses, being close to the race tracks (see Ascot Racecourse and Belmont Park). Until 1956 the Belmont Spur Railway linked Bayswater on the Perth to Midland line to the Ascot race track.

== Wards ==
The city is divided into four wards: East Ward, West Ward, Central Ward, and South Ward, each represented by two councillors. Previously, the Mayor and Deputy Mayor were elected from among the councillors. In 2023, voters elected Robert Rossi, former West Ward Councillor and Deputy Mayor, as the city's first popularly elected Mayor. He won the election from a field of five candidates. Elections are held on the third Saturday in October every odd year, with councillors elected to four year terms. Approximately half of all positions are up for election at each election.

Political parties do not typically endorse candidates in local government in Western Australia. However, elected members are required to disclose membership of any political party.

Ward	Councillor	Joined council	Term ends	Notes
-	Robert Rossi (Mayor)	2003	2027	Was Deputy Mayor from 2013 - 2019 and 2021 - 2023. Elected as Mayor in 2023
East	Phillip Marks	1999	2027	Was Mayor from 2011 - 2023
East	Bernie Ryan	2013	2029	
West	Deborah Sessions	2021	2029	Elected as Deputy Mayor in 2023
West	Christopher Kulczycki	2023	2027	
Central	George Sekulla	2017	2029	Was Deputy Mayor between 2019 - 2021
Central	Jarod Harris	2024	2027	
South	Abedin	2025	2027	
South	Jenny Davis	2017	2029	

== Suburbs ==
The suburbs of the City of Belmont with population and size figures based on the most recent Australian census:

Suburb	Population	Area	Map
Ascot	3,095 (SAL 2021)	3.6 km^{2} (1.4 sq mi)	
Belmont	6,959 (SAL 2021)	4.4 km^{2} (1.7 sq mi)	
Cloverdale	8,864 (SAL 2021)	3.9 km^{2} (1.5 sq mi)	
Kewdale	7,397 (SAL 2021)	8.4 km^{2} (3.2 sq mi)	
Perth Airport *	25 (SAL 2021)	19.2 km^{2} (7.4 sq mi)	
Redcliffe	5,030 (SAL 2021)	2.7 km^{2} (1.0 sq mi)	
Rivervale	10,897 (SAL 2021)	3.3 km^{2} (1.3 sq mi)	

( * indicates suburb partially located within City)

== Population ==
Historical population

Year	Pop.	±% p.a.
1911	1,088	—
1921	1,866	+5.54%
1933	3,139	+4.43%
1947	5,712	+4.37%
1954	15,820	+15.67%
1961	20,393	+3.69%
1966	26,978	+5.76%
1971	32,656	+3.89%
1976	31,531	−0.70%

Year	Pop.	±% p.a.
1981	29,855	−1.09%
1986	28,867	−0.67%
1991	26,744	−1.52%
1996	26,613	−0.10%
2001	28,817	+1.60%
2006	30,331	+1.03%
2011	35,209	+3.03%
2016	39,682	+2.42%
2021	42,257	+1.27%

== Sister cities ==
- Adachi-ku, Tokyo, Japan – 1 October 1984

== Heritage-listed places ==
As of 2024, 124 places are heritage-listed in the City of Belmont, of which seven are on the State Register of Heritage Places, among them the Garratt Road Bridge.
