= High Wycombe, Western Australia =

High Wycombe Perth, Western Australia
- Coordinates: 31°56′51″S 116°00′00″E
- Population: 12,198 (SAL 2021)
- Established: 1978
- Postcode(s): 6057
- Area: 10.5 km^{2} (4.1 sq mi)
- Location: 18 km (11 mi) from Perth
- LGA(s): City of Kalamunda
- State electorate(s): Forrestfield
- Federal division(s): Bullwinkel
Suburbs around High Wycombe:
| South Guildford | Hazelmere | Bushmead |
| Perth Airport | High Wycombe | Maida Vale |
| Forrestfield | Forrestfield | Maida Vale |

High Wycombe (/ˈwɪkəm/) is a suburb of Perth, Western Australia, within the City of Kalamunda. High Wycombe lies east of the Perth CBD at the base of the Darling Scarp (commonly referred to as the foothills). Formerly part of Maida Vale, the suburb was officially declared on 2 June 1978; its name, which was first used in 1958 by a subdivider, Western Agencies, refers to the town in Buckinghamshire where one of the partners in the firm was born.

High Wycombe is directly east of Perth Airport, west of Maida Vale, north of Forrestfield, and south of the industrial suburb of Hazelmere.

High Wycombe is a large suburb in area, with its main population centred on roads that connect from Newburn Road, and is bounded by Kalamunda Road to the north, Dundas Road to the west, Maida Vale Road to the south, and Roe Highway to the east. The suburb's growth is mainly in this area, however the estate of Jacaranda Springs, which is based on the northern side of Kalamunda Road, is also experiencing growth. A sparsely populated area around Milner Road is also part of the suburb.

== Demographics ==
In the 2016 census, there were 12,308 people in High Wycombe. This marks an increase of 527 persons in comparison to the 2011 census, which had the population at 11,781. Of these 49.7% were male and 50.3% were female. Aboriginal and/or Torres Strait Islander people made up 2.7% of the population.

The most common responses for religion in High Wycombe were No Religion, so described 35.7%, Catholic 21.1%, Anglican 16.2%, Not stated 10.2% and Christian, nfd 3.0%. In High Wycombe, Christianity was the largest religious group reported overall (56.2%) (this figure excludes not stated responses).

== Facilities ==
=== Education ===
- High Wycombe Primary School, Newburn Road (public school)
- Edney Primary School, Edney Road (public school)
- Matthew Gibney Catholic Primary School (private school)

=== Parks and sporting reserves ===
- Scott Reserve - Home of the High Wycombe cricket club and High Wycombe Bulldogs football teams. The oval is also shared by Edney Primary School, and is mainly used by the school as their oval.
- Fleming Reserve - small oval with night lighting, small playground and public toilets, small skate park and BMX track.
- High Wycombe Recreation Centre - Indoor sports, dancing, martial arts and meeting place. Borders on Edney Road Primary school and Scott Reserve, and like Scott Reserve is used by Edney Primary School, albeit far less frequently.
- Ollie Worrell Reserve - basketball hoop, playground Australian Rules goals, soccer goals and cricket nets. It's used by Matthew Gibney Catholic Primary School.

=== Public transport ===
High Wycombe is served by Transperth bus services, operated by Path Transit and Swan Transit. Before the Airport Line opened on the 9th of October 2022, routes 296 and 299 provided the primary service for High Wycombe, operating to Elizabeth Quay Bus Station in the Perth CBD via Great Eastern Highway, or to Kalamunda bus station in Kalamunda, a regional centre of the Perth Hills. Route 296 served the centre of High Wycombe, whilst route 299 operated along Kalamunda Road, serving the northern part of the suburb. During the peak commuter period in the peak direction of travel, route 299 was replaced by route 295, operating limited stops along Great Eastern Highway, and route 296 was supplemented by route 298, which additionally served a greater area of the west of the suburb and travelled to Elizabeth Quay Bus Station via Shepperton Road.

Alternate, less frequent bus routes provided connections to railway stations and shopping centres in the Eastern metropolitan region. Route 294 operated to Midland railway station and Midland Gate shopping centre, or to Cannington railway station and Westfield Carousel shopping centre. Route 304 provided an off peak service to Midland railway station from Hillview Village, a retirement community in the west of the suburb.

As part of the Airport line, High Wycombe is now served by High Wycombe railway station. It was originally scheduled to be completed in 2020 but, after numerous delays, due to flooding, a sinkhole, and slower than expected borers, the opening was pushed back to the latter half of 2021. That was further delayed until 9 October 2022. The new rail line provides a 20-minute travel time to the Perth CBD, as well as a 2-minute travel time to the Perth Airport. High Wycombe Station is served by many new bus routes which improved service for the suburb. Route 280 acts as a partial replacement for the southern section of route 294, providing the connection to Cannington, whilst routes 277 and 278 now connect to Midland, replacing the northern part of the 294. Routes 275 and 276 replaced the 295/299 and 296 respectively, operating on the same alignment to Kalamunda Bus Station after departing the station, and providing a more frequent connection throughout the day. Finally, routes 270 and 271 provide connections to Forrestfield and onto Belmont and the Perth CBD by bus. Route 293 operates to Redcliffe station via Belmont, partially replacing the old 298 route.

==== Bus ====
- 270 High Wycombe Station to Elizabeth Quay Bus Station – serves Maida Vale Road
- 271 High Wycombe Station to Forrestfield – serves Dundas Road
- 275 High Wycombe Station to Walliston – serves Maida Vale Road
- 276 High Wycombe Station to Kalamunda Bus Station – serves Maida Vale Road, Newburn Road and Kalamunda Road
- 277 High Wycombe Station to Midland Station – serves Maida Vale Road, Newburn Road and Kalamunda Road
- 278 High Wycombe Station to Midland Station – serves Dundas Road, Wittenoom Road and Kalamunda Road
- 280 High Wycombe Station to Westfield Carousel – serves Dundas Road
- 293 High Wycombe Station to Redcliffe Station – serves Dundas Road and Abernethy Road
- 294 High Wycombe Station to Foodbank Western Australia – serves Dundas Road and Abernethy Road

==== Rail ====
- Airport Line
  - High Wycombe Station

=== Other public facilities ===
- Maida Vale Baptist Church, Edney Road
- St Thomas' Anglican Church, Cyril Road
- 1st Scout Hall of Maida Vale Scouts, corner Newburn Road and Western Avenue
- Public Library, Markham Road
- Cyril Road Hall
