= Forrestfield, Western Australia =

Forrestfield
- Suburb
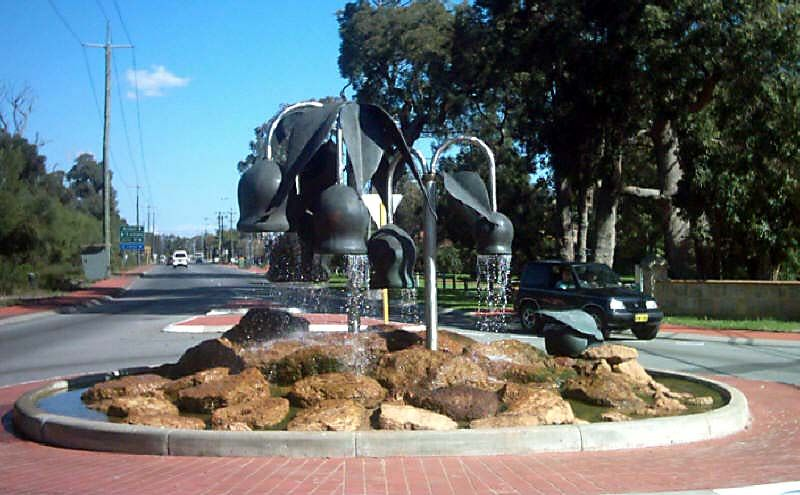
- Roundabout at entrance to Hartfield Park
- Interactive map of Forrestfield
- Coordinates: 31.98°S 115.993611°E
- Country: Australia
- State: Western Australia
- City: Perth
- LGA: City of Kalamunda

Government
  - State electorate: Forrestfield
  - Federal division: Bullwinkel

Population
  - Total: 13,181 (SAL 2021)
- Postcode: 6058
Suburbs around Forrestfield
High Wycombe	Maida Vale	Kalamunda
Perth Airport	Forrestfield	Lesmurdie
Kewdale	Wattle Grove	Wattle Grove

Forrestfield is a suburb of the City of Kalamunda in Western Australia. It lies 15 kilometres to the south-east of Perth at the base of the Darling Scarp and the southern border of Perth Airport.

The suburb is split by Roe Highway into a southern residential area and a northern industrial area. The suburb is adjacent to Wattle Grove, Cloverdale and Kalamunda.

== Industrial area ==
=== Rail ===
The industrial area contains a major rail hub. The 241 hectare Forrestfield Marshalling Yard was built adjacent to the Kwinana railway line opening in stages between 1968 and 1973 in conjunction with the nearby Kewdale Freight Terminal as a replacement for the Perth Marshalling Yard and two other inner Perth yards. Within the confines of the yard, separate depots were built for locomotive, carriage and wagon maintenance.

It was previously used by the Western Australian Government Railways, Westrail and Australian Railroad Group. As at January 2018, Aurizon, SCT Logistics and Watco Australia use the yard. Aurizon closed its terminal in late-2017 as part of the closure of its intermodal business. Gemco Rail also has a facility.

Bounded by Dundas Road to the east, the Tonkin Highway to the south and Perth Airport to the west, some of the land was no longer required for railway by in the late 1990s and rezoned for industrial use. A combined 102 hectares was sold to the CBH Group, LandCorp and Specialised Container Transport.

CBH Group's Metro Grains Centre was completed in 1998. In mid-2005 BlueScope constructed a large warehouse on former Westrail land. Kenworth DAF Trucks also relocated from Guildford to a new complex on Abernethy Road in 2005.

=== Infrastructure ===
On 3 November 2016, construction commenced on the Airport line, which opened on October 9, 2022. The line has three stations: Redcliffe, Airport Central and High Wycombe.

The Western Australian Government has prompted the City of Kalamunda to investigate the possibility of business and infrastructure opportunities arising from the completion of the new link for Forrestfield and its surrounding areas. The completion of the Airport Link is expected to facilitate the continuing growth of Perth Airport as a nationally integral part of employment, commerce and international trade.

Forrestfield's northern and eastern outskirts are home to the majority of the areas industrial enterprise. The area is host to a wide range of commercial business-to-business industries. Some of the most notable occupants include Grace Removals, Improvid and the Super Retail Group.

== History ==
Settlement of the area dates from the late 1800s. Population was minimal until the early 1900s, with growth during the interwar period. Significant development did not occur until the post-war years, with rapid growth from the 1950s into the 1970s. The population has been relatively stable since the early 1990s, a result of some new dwellings being added to the area, but a decline in the average number of persons living in each dwelling.

There is authority to suggest it is named after John Forrest, Western Australia's first Premier, or his brother Alexander. However, local folklore suggests that the name comes from Charles Hale, who settled in the area in 1902 and planted crops amongst the native forest bushland, hence Forrestfield. In 1921 a Forrestfield Progress Association was formed, and the name was shown on plans in 1944.

== Shopping ==
Located on the corner of Hale Road and Strelitzia Avenue, the Forrestfield Forum and Marketplace comprises 52 shops including Coles and Woolworths supermarkets. It is owned by the Hawaiian Group.

Cumberland Road has a FoodWorks supermarket, a newsagency, a hairdresser, some dining and fast-food venues. There are a range of other retail establishments scattered throughout Forrestfield, including taverns, liqueur shops, a nursery, and various delis.

== Educational facilities ==
Forrestfield contains the following educational institutions:

- Darling Range Sports College, formerly Forrestfield Senior High School
- Dawson Park Primary
- Forrestfield Primary
- HillSide Christian College, formerly Forrestfield Christian School
- Woodlupine Primary
- Tabor College

== Demographics ==
In the 2021 census, Forrestfield recorded a population of 13,181 people: 50.0% male and 50.0% female. The median/average age of the Forrestfield population is 38 years.

== Amenities ==
Hartfield Park Recreation Centre: This complex includes an indoor stadium as well as playing fields for cricket, rugby, Australian rules football, hockey, soccer (football), an 18-hole golf course, an equestrian centre plus support facilities for each. There is also a nature conservation park and a lake. Discovery Park - Perth Airport Caravan and Holiday Park on Hale Road just off of Tonkin Highway.

== Public transport ==
=== Bus ===
- 270 High Wycombe station to Elizabeth Quay bus station – serves Hawtin Road and Hale Road
- 271 High Wycombe station to Forrestfield – serves Berkshire Road, Bougainvillea Avenue, Dawson Avenue, Hicks Street, Cypress Road, Hale Road, Anderson Road, Lewis Road, Jubilee Road, Cumberland Road and Edinburgh Road
- 280 High Wycombe station to Westfield Carousel – serves Berkshire Road and Hale Road
- 281 Darling Range Sports College to Lesmurdie Senior High School – serves Berkshire Road and Hale Road
- 293 High Wycombe station to Redcliffe Station – serves Abernethy Road
