= South Guildford, Western Australia =

South Guildford
- Suburb
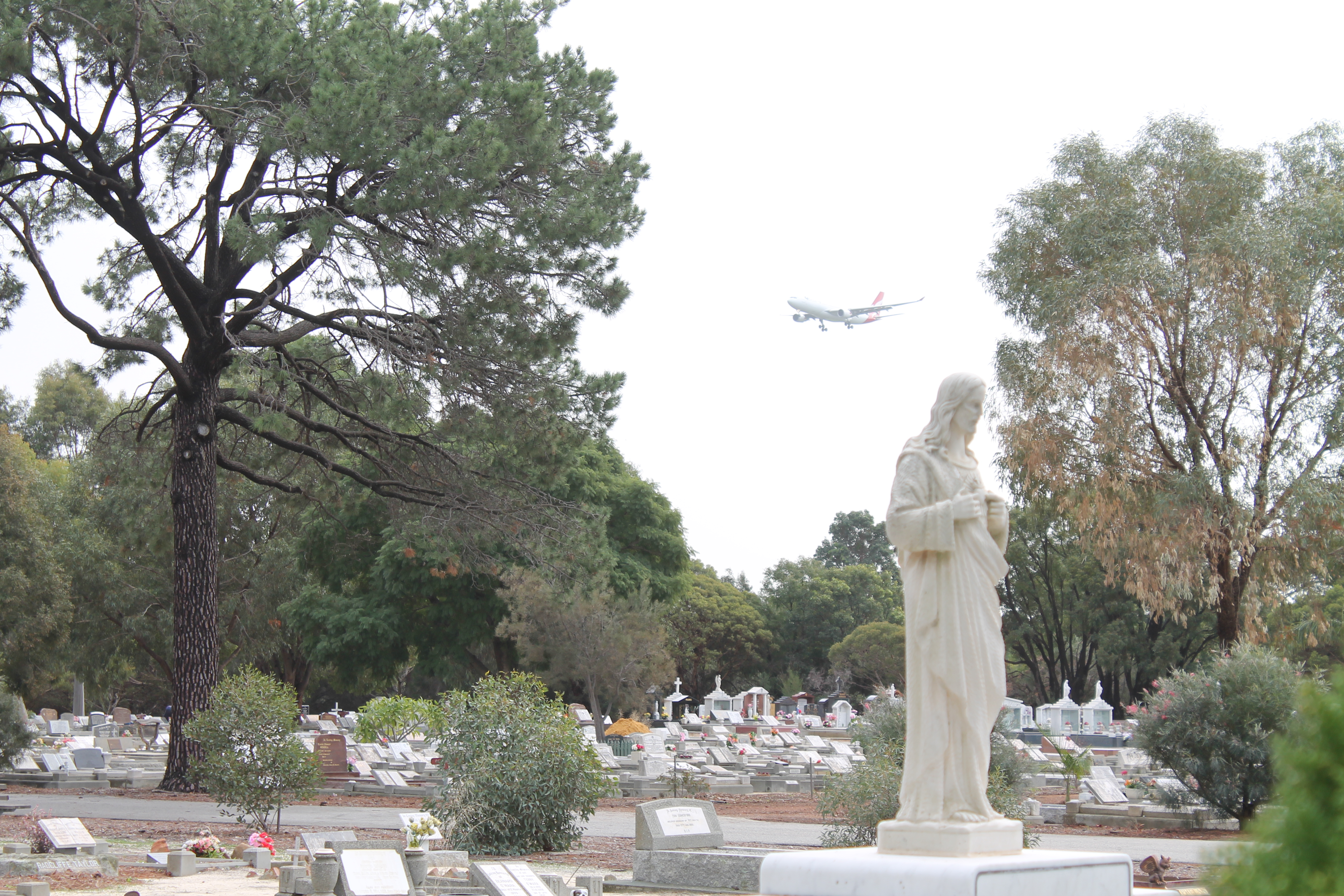
- Guildford Cemetery
- Interactive map of South Guildford
- Coordinates: 31.912°S 115.972°E
- Country: Australia
- State: Western Australia
- City: Perth
- LGA: City of Swan
- Location: 14 km (8.7 mi) NE of Perth; 5 km (3.1 mi) SW of Midland

Government
  - State electorate: Belmont
  - Federal division: Hasluck

Area
  - Total: 11.1 km^{2} (4.3 sq mi)

Population
  - Total: 3,781 (SAL 2021)
- Postcode: 6055
Suburbs around South Guildford
Bassendean	Guildford	Woodbridge
Bassendean	South Guildford	Hazelmere
Ascot	Perth Airport	High Wycombe

South Guildford is a suburb of Perth, Western Australia, located in the City of Swan local government area. It is separated from the suburb of Guildford by the Helena River.

== Transport ==
South Guildford is served by Transperth bus routes 290 and 291, operating between Redcliffe railway station and Midland railway station. 290 operates in the west along Great Eastern Highway while 291 operates through the residential heart of the suburb. This route offers service all through the week, while route 290 is a faster service which does not operate on Sundays and public holidays. Guildford and East Guildford train stations are actually the closest to this suburb by distance, but there are no direct bus connection to them, although route 290 operates within walking distance of both.

=== Bus ===
- 290 Redcliffe Station to Midland Station – serves Great Eastern Highway
- 291 Redcliffe Station to Midland Station – serves Great Eastern Highway, Kalamunda Road, Barker Road, Waterhall Road, Edgar Wilkes Entrance, Serpentine Drive and West Parade
