= Kewdale, Western Australia =

Kewdale
- Suburb
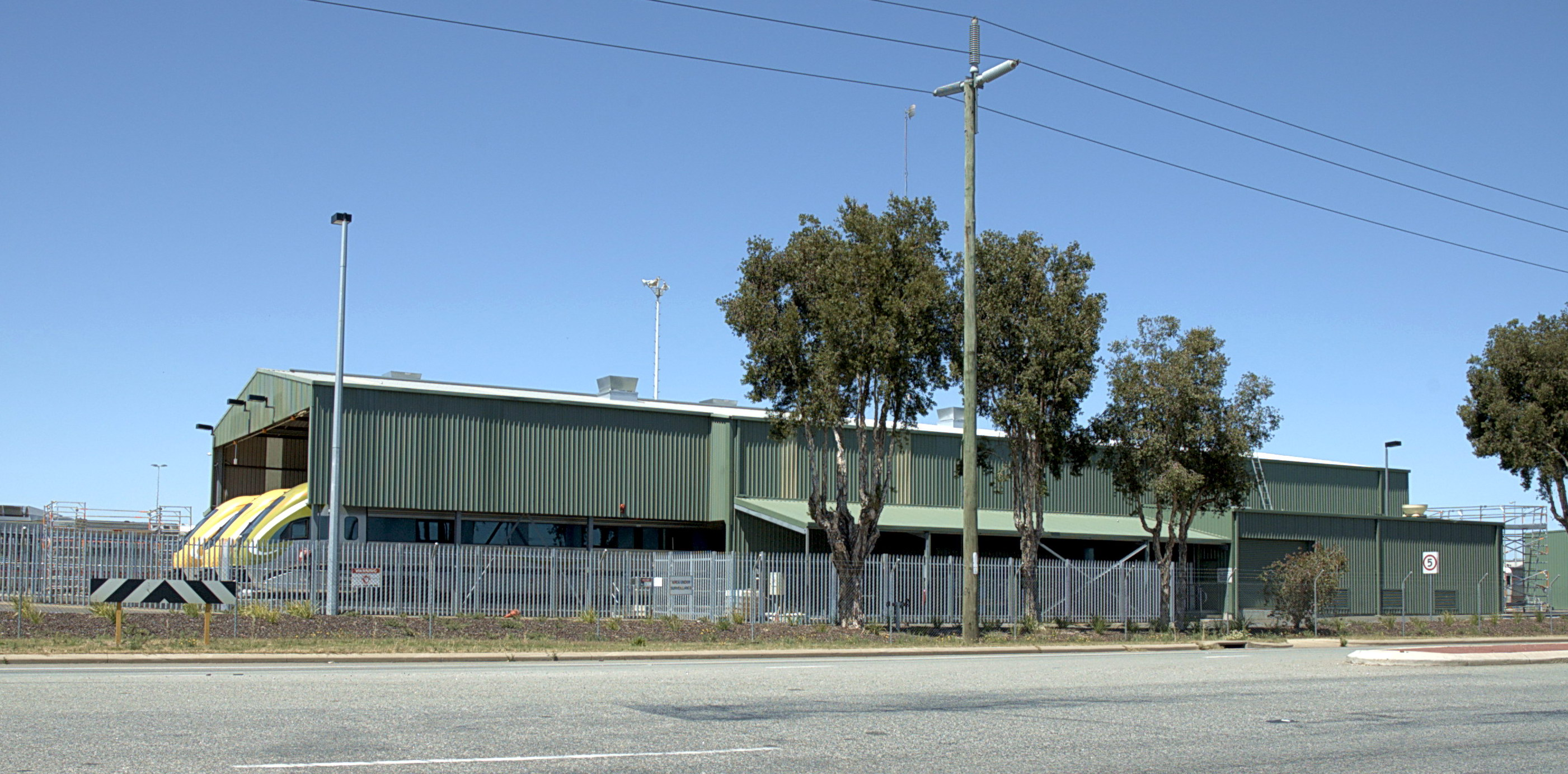
- Transwa Prospector depot at Kewdale Freight Terminal
- Interactive map of Kewdale
- Coordinates: 31.978°S 115.951°E
- Country: Australia
- State: Western Australia
- City: Perth
- LGA: City of Belmont
- Location: 8 km (5.0 mi) from Perth
- Established: 1949

Government
  - State electorate: Belmont
  - Federal division: Swan

Population
  - Total: 7,397 (SAL 2021)
- Postcode: 6105
Suburbs around Kewdale
Rivervale	Cloverdale	Redcliffe
Lathlain	Kewdale	Forrestfield
Carlisle	Welshpool	Wattle Grove

Kewdale is a suburb of Perth, Western Australia within the City of Belmont. Kew Street was one of the first roads in this district, hence the naming of the suburb.

== Geography ==
Kewdale is bounded by Cloverdale and Perth Airport to the north, Belmont to the east and Welshpool and Carlisle to the south. The suburb is a mixture of residential to the west with commercial and industrial areas to the east. A number of notable parks and reserves can be found in the area, including Tomato Lake, Willow Lake Park, Wicca Reserve, Peet and Peachy parks and smaller Cottage and Nance Parks to the east.

== Population ==
Historical population
Year	Pop.	±% p.a.
2001	5,434	—
2006	5,439	+0.02%
2011	6,190	+2.62%
2016	6,891	+2.17%
2021	7,397	+1.43%
Source: ABS

== Transport ==
Kewdale is well serviced by several bus routes including 37, 38, 39, 270, 284, 285, 293 and 935 which offer direct connections to Perth Airport, Elizabeth Quay bus station, Curtin University bus station, St Georges Terrace, Victoria Park transfer station, Oats Street railway station, Redcliffe railway station, Airport Central railway station and High Wycombe railway station.

The Kewdale residential area is bound by main roads such as Orrong Road, Abernethy Road and Leach Highway.

=== Bus ===
- 36 Airport Central Station to Cannington Station – serves Kewdale Road
- 37 Airport Central Station to Curtin University Bus Station – serves Kewdale Road, Abernethy Road, Belmont Avenue, Gabriel Street and Oats Street
- 38 Perth Busport to Cloverdale – serves Wright Street
- 39 Elizabeth Quay Bus Station to Redcliffe Station – serves Oats Street, Acton Avenue, Scott Street, Peachey Avenue, Kew Street and Belmont Avenue
- 51 Perth Busport to Cannington Station – serves Orrong Road
- 270 Elizabeth Quay Bus Station to High Wycombe Station – serves Belmont Avenue and Abernethy Road
- 284 Belmont Forum to Curtin University Bus Station – serves President Street, Scott Street, Peachey Avenue, Kew Street and Belmont Avenue
- 285 Kewdale to East Victoria Park – serves Hazelhurst Street, Valentine Street, Chilver Street, Kewdale Road, Marchesi Street and Orrong Road
- 293 Redcliffe Station to High Wycombe Station – serves Abernethy Road
- 935 Redcliffe Station to Kings Park (high frequency) – serves Belmont Avenue
- 998 Fremantle Station to Fremantle Station (limited stops) – CircleRoute Clockwise, serves Wright Street and Orrong Road
- 999 Fremantle Station to Fremantle Station (limited stops) – CircleRoute Anti-Clockwise, serves Orrong Road and Wright Street

== See also ==
- Australian Islamic College, Kewdale
- Kewdale Freight Terminal
