= Maida Vale, Western Australia =

Maida Vale
- Suburb
- Interactive map of Maida Vale
- Coordinates: 31.953°S 116.023°E
- Country: Australia
- State: Western Australia
- City: Perth
- LGA: City of Kalamunda
- Location: 22 km (14 mi) from Perth

Government
  - State electorate: Forrestfield
  - Federal division: Bullwinkel

Population
  - Total: 4,499 (SAL 2016)
- Postcode: 6057
Suburbs around Maida Vale
High Wycombe	Bushmead	Gooseberry Hill
High Wycombe	Maida Vale	Gooseberry Hill
Forrestfield	Forrestfield	Kalamunda

Maida Vale is a suburb of Perth, Western Australia, located within the City of Kalamunda. Kalamunda Road runs through the suburb. Its first European settler was William Henry Mead, who arrived in 1873, built a home in the Ridge Hill area and established the orchard Orangedale. It was named in 1910 after a property name of another settler, WH McCormack. The name is believed to be derived from the eponymous area of West London, which is itself named after the 1806 Battle of Maida.

Within the suburb there is a primary school (Maida Vale Primary School), a golf course, numerous parks/ovals, a Seventh Day Adventist church ground and caravan park, two child care centres, a heated swimming pool and several small shops including a BP Petrol station, BWS and a new IGA grocery store.

The suburb contains a set of traffic lights at the intersection of Kalamunda Rd, Hawtin Road and Gooseberry Hill Road. This intersection is known as 'six-ways', because at one point there were six different roads at the intersection. The intersection marks the end of Gooseberry Hill Road, and the start of Hawtin Road.

The suburb retains areas of natural bushland and is not completely built-up with housing, although there are plans to increase housing with expansion on the Crystal Brook housing estate. Maida Vale is home to a rare flower named the Maida Vale Bell. Many older established trees in the area are a breeding ground for Carnaby's Black Cockatoo and flocks of up to 300 birds are often seen in the suburb.

== Transport ==
Transperth bus routes serving the suburb are:

Towards High Wycombe railway station:

- 270 and 275 via Maida Vale Road.
- 276 and 277 via Newburn Road.

Away from High Wycombe railway station:

- 270 to Elizabeth Quay bus station via Belmont Forum and Victoria Park transfer station.
- 275 to Walliston (Kalamunda Bus Depot) via Kalamunda Road and Kalamunda bus station.
- 276 to Kalamunda bus station via Gooseberry Hill Road.
- 277 to Midland Station via Midland Road.

Due to a right turn from Midland Road onto Kalamunda Road being considered too dangerous for large vehicles, High Wycombe-bound 277 services turn left on to Kalamunda Road and then travel to the Maida Vale Road / Priory Road roundabout to U-turn and travel back in the correct direction. However, there are no stops on this part of the route so it can seem rather time wasting, especially at times of the day when Kalamunda Road is quiet.

Route 307 services also service the eastern part of the suburb along Watsonia Road and travel between Kalamunda bus station and Midland railway station via Helena Valley.
