= High Wycombe railway station, Perth =

Railway station in Perth, Western Australia

High Wycombe
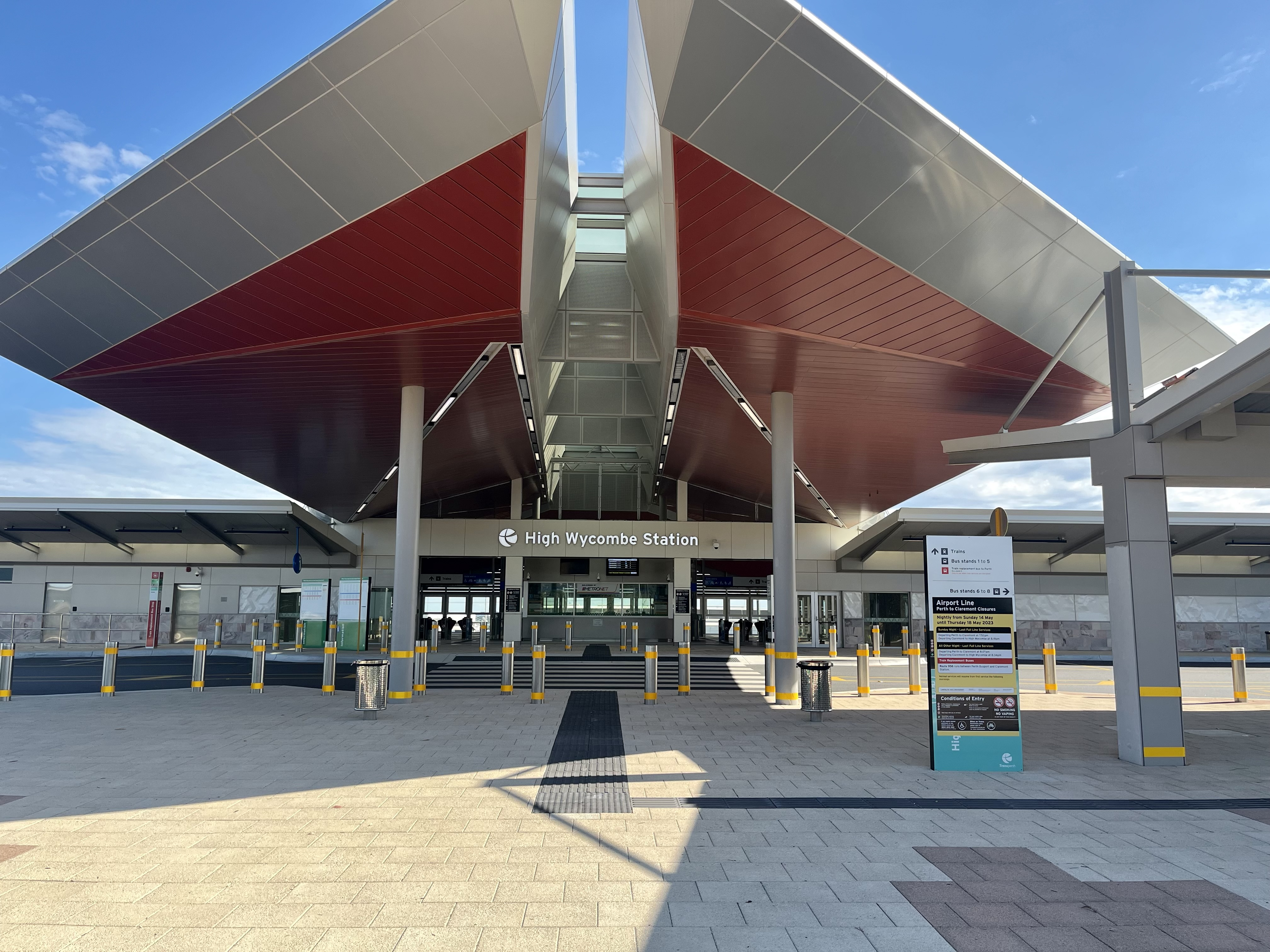
- Station building and entrance, May 2023

General information
- Location: Dundas Road, High Wycombe; Western Australia; Australia
- Coordinates: 31°57′17″S 115°59′32″E
- Owner: Public Transport Authority
- Operator: Transperth Train Operations
- Line: Airport line
- Platforms: 1 island platform with 2 platform edges
- Tracks: 2
- Bus stands: 8
- Connections: Bus

Construction
- Parking: Multi-storey car park with 1,200 bays
- Cycle facilities: 180 secure bicycle bays
- Accessible: Yes

Other information
- Fare zone: 2

History
- Opened: 9 October 2022

Passengers
- Predicted: 9,800 per day

Services
Preceding station	Transperth	Following station
Airport Central towards Perth or Claremont	Airport line	Terminus
Location
- Location of High Wycombe station

High Wycombe railway station is a Transperth commuter rail station in Perth, Western Australia. The station is the eastern terminus of the Airport line and was one of three stations built as part of the Forrestfield–Airport Link project.

The station was originally known as Forrestfield station during planning and construction. The contract for the Forrestfield–Airport Link, which consists of 8 kilometres (5 mi) of twin bored tunnels and three new stations, was awarded to Salini Impregilo and NRW Pty Ltd in April 2016. High Wycombe station itself was constructed above ground, with the line entering a tunnel just north of the station. Construction began in November 2016, with works initially focussing on building the tunnel dive structure. Tunnelling began in July 2017, and construction of the station itself had begun by November 2017. For much of the construction period, the site contained infrastructure to support the tunnelling operation.

Originally planned to open in 2020, the line officially opened on 9 October 2022. It is served by trains every twelve minutes during peak and every fifteen minutes outside peak and on weekends and public holidays. At night, trains are half-hourly or hourly. The journey to Perth station takes 22 minutes.

== Description ==
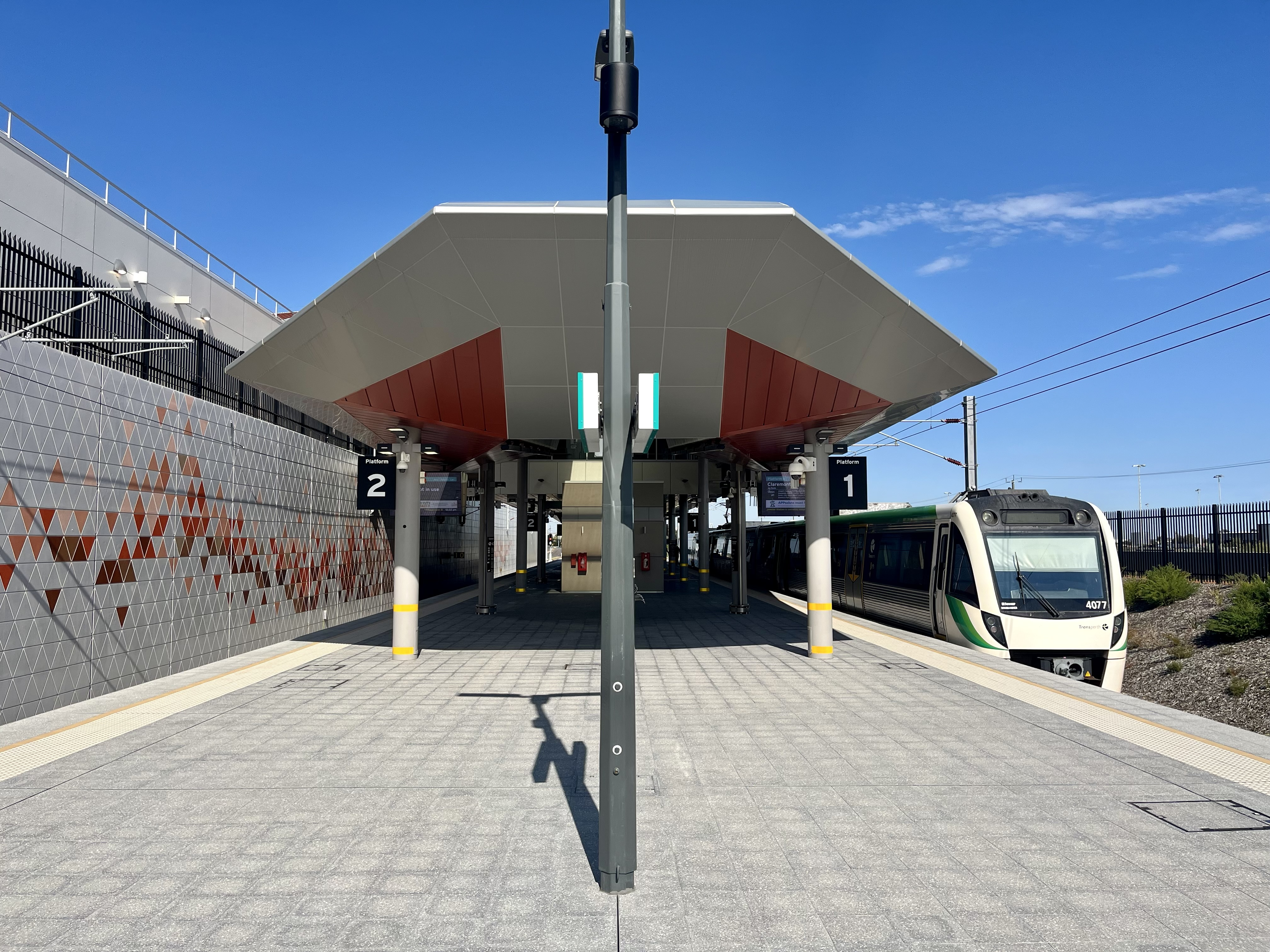
Station platform with a Transperth B-series train on platform 1

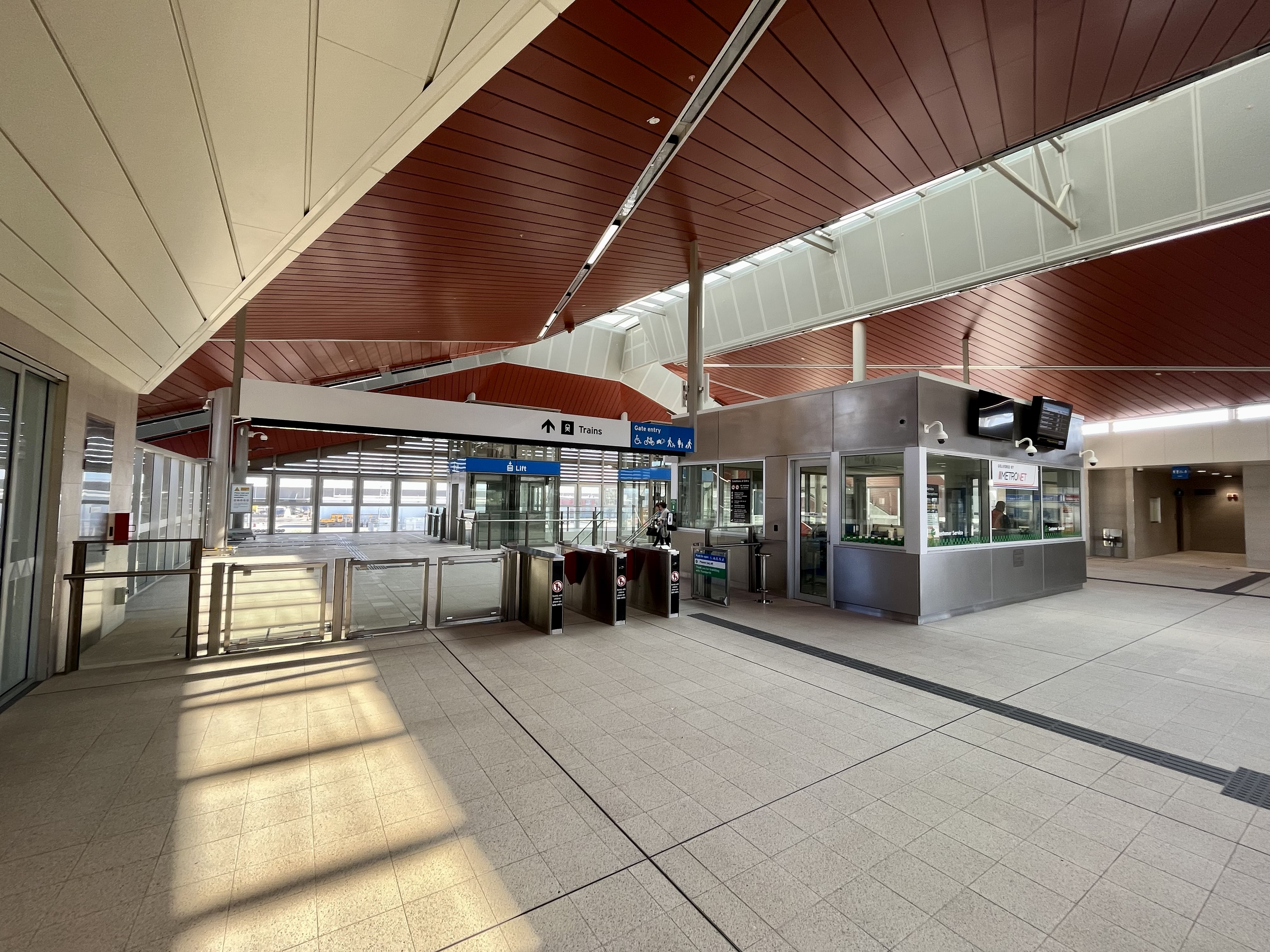
Station concourse

High Wycombe station is located east of the Forrestfield Marshalling Yard in High Wycombe. It is part of the Transperth system and is the easternmost station of the Airport line, which branches off the Midland line and travels through 8 kilometres (5 mi) of bored tunnels before surfacing at High Wycombe, which is at surface level. The adjacent station is Airport Central station.

The station consists of a single island platform with two platform edges. The platform is 12.5 metres (41 ft) wide and 150 metres (490 ft) long, long enough for a six-car train, the longest trains on the network. The entrance is east of the platforms and located on a raised ground level which is held back by a 300-metre (980 ft) long retaining wall. The platform is linked to the entrance-level concourse by stairs, lifts and escalators. On the concourse are fare gates. The station's roof was designed to be easily visible from the surrounding precinct and lead passengers to the entrance. Its colour was chosen to mimic the red earthy colours of the nearby Darling Scarp, and its shape was designed to mimic an aircraft wing. Outside the station building is a bus interchange with eight bus stands. A three-level multi-storey car park with room for 1,200 cars is 300 metres (980 ft) north of the station. Other facilities include toilets and two bicycle shelters for 184 bicycles. The land directly east of the station is designated for a transit-oriented development.

=== Public art ===
Next to the car park is the cutterhead for one of the tunnel boring machines (TBMs) that was used to bore the tunnels for the Airport line. This is accompanied by a sign explaining the tunnelling process. On the station's front façade and the retaining wall viewable from the platform are two artworks by Adam Cruickshank, Pavel Perina, and George Domahidy, titled Scarp. A 100-metre (330 ft) long and 5.5-metre (18 ft) high section of the retaining wall consists of earthy orange and red coloured tessellated triangles which reflect the colours of the Darling Scarp and the station's roof. On the front façade is a white 3D Jesmonite panel consisting of smaller tessellating triangles which also represent the Darling Scarp. In the station's forecourt is the Noongar Recognition Project by Noongar artist Maitland Hill in collaboration with the Forrestfield–Airport Link's Aboriginal Stakeholder Group. This consists of three laser-etched steel images accompanied by signs telling local Noongar stories.

Public art at High Wycombe station

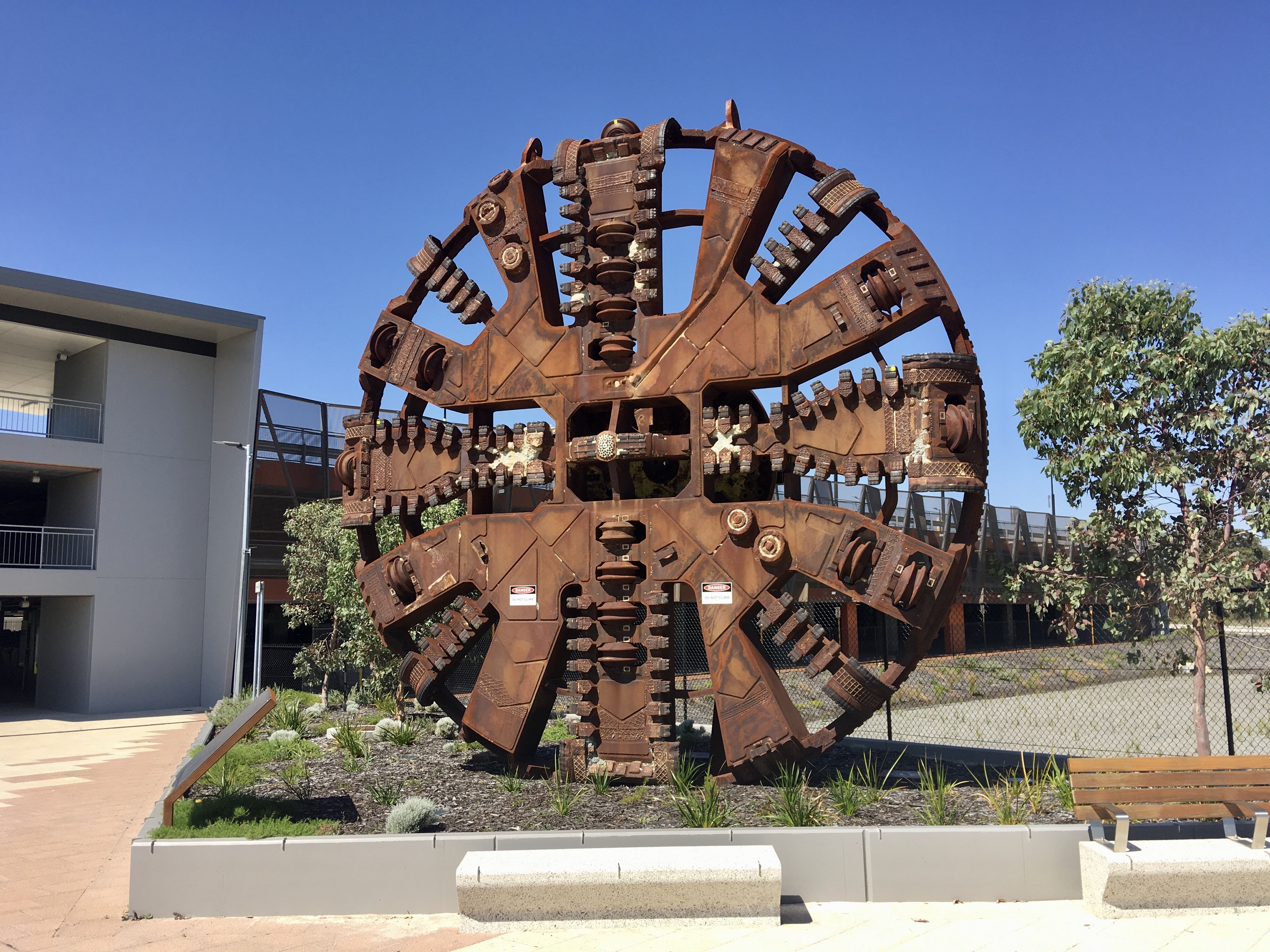
TBM cutterhead next to car park

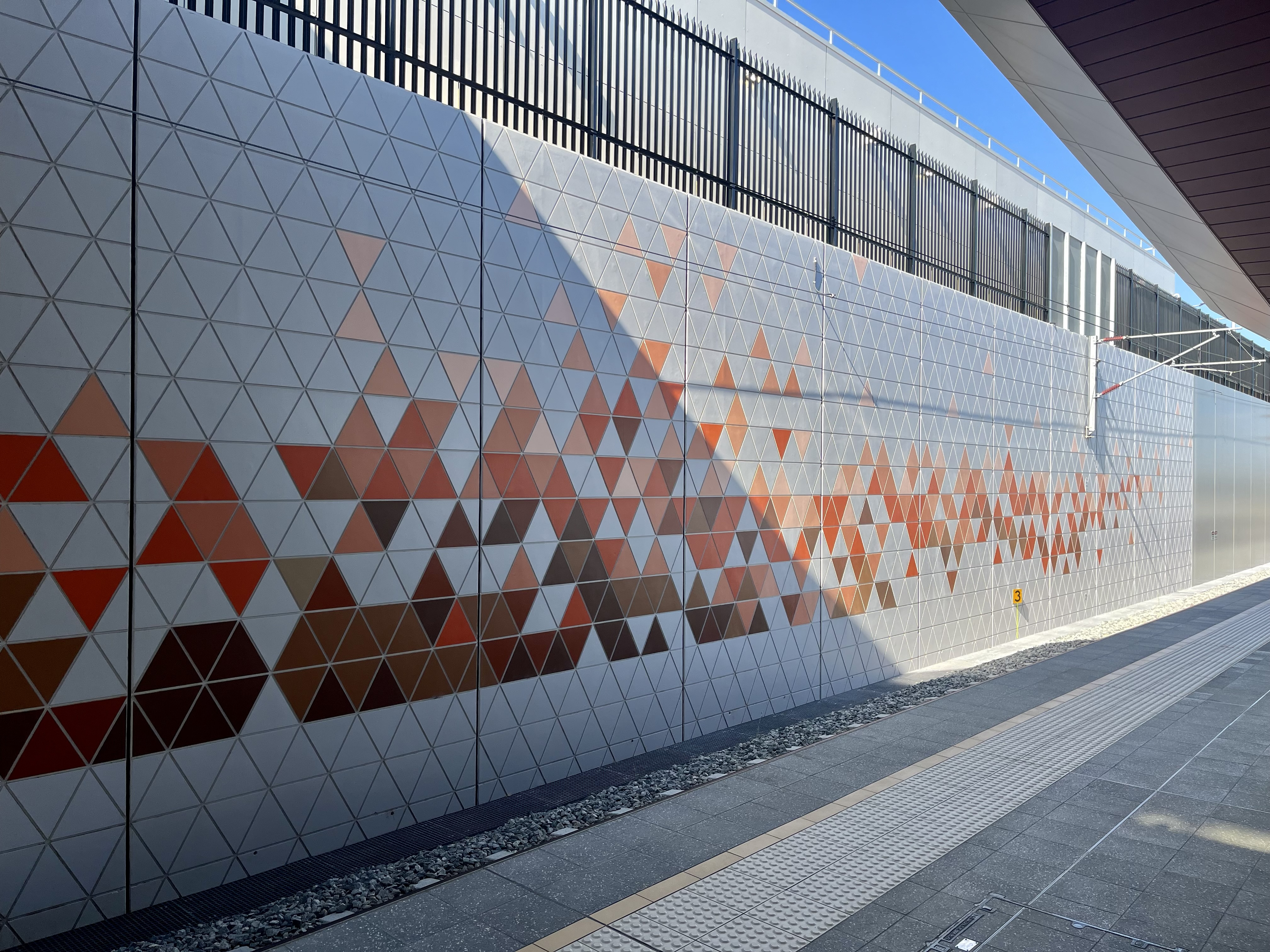
Scarp along the retaining wall

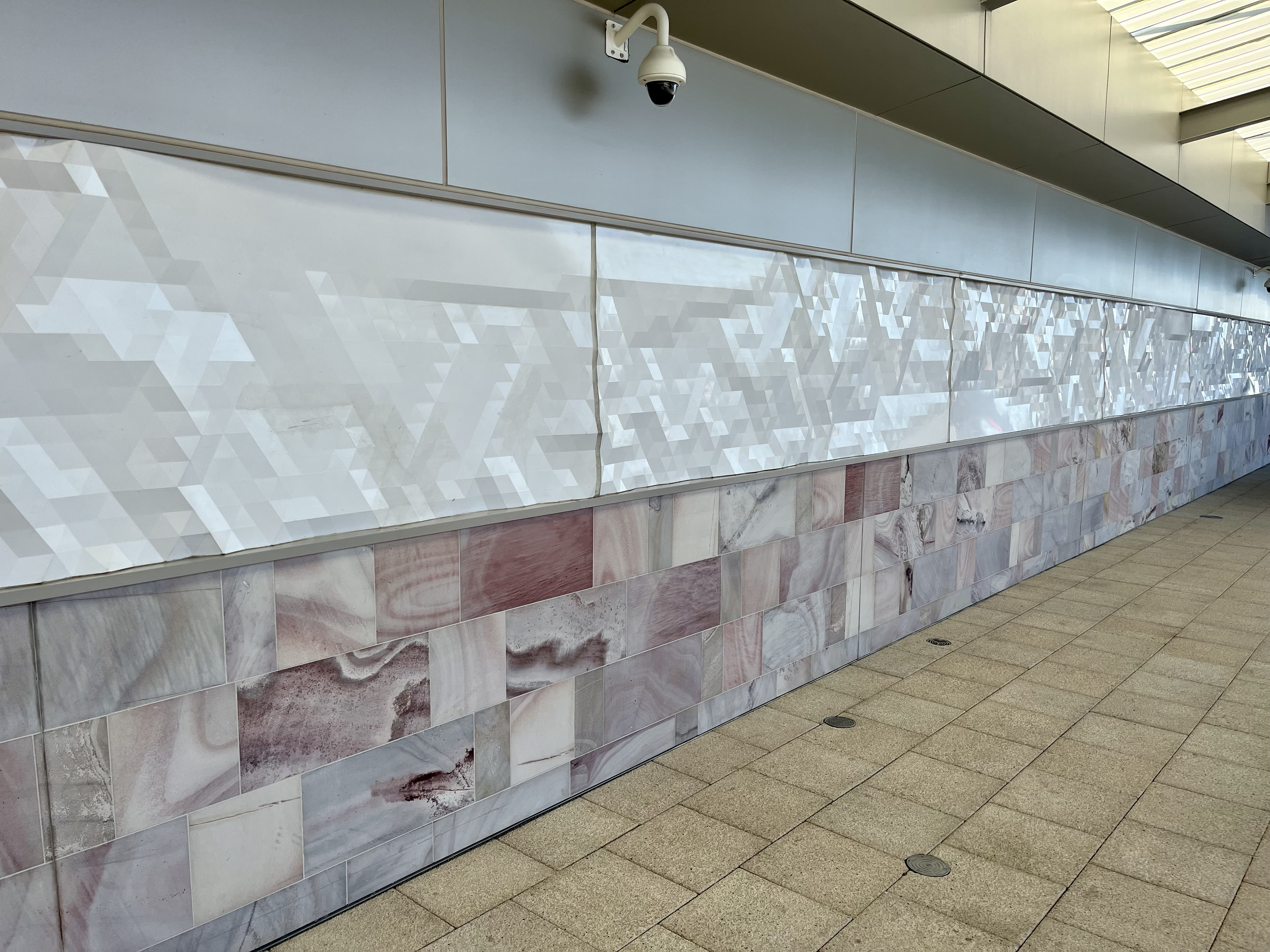
Scarp at the station's front façade

== History ==
=== Planning and construction ===
During planning and initial construction, the station was called Forrestfield station after the nearby suburb of Forrestfield. It was built by the Public Transport Authority (PTA) as part of the Forrestfield–Airport Link project, which involved the construction of 8 kilometres (5 mi) of twin bored tunnels between High Wycombe and Bayswater and two other stations: Airport Central and Redcliffe stations. Forward works such as vegetation clearing and service relocations began in November 2015 and continued into 2016. The main contract, worth A$1.176 billion, was awarded to a joint venture of Salini Impregilo and NRW Pty Ltd (SI/NRW) in April 2016. At the time, the station was expected to be open by 2020. Weston Williamson and GHD Woodhead were appointed by SI/NRW as the designers of the three stations.

In August 2016, SI-NRW began site investigations, and a development application for early works and dive structure works was submitted to the Western Australian Planning Commission. The early works and station works were put into separate development applications so that early works could start as soon as possible. By September 2016, forward works were complete and site establishment had begun. The development application was approved in October, allowing early works to commence.

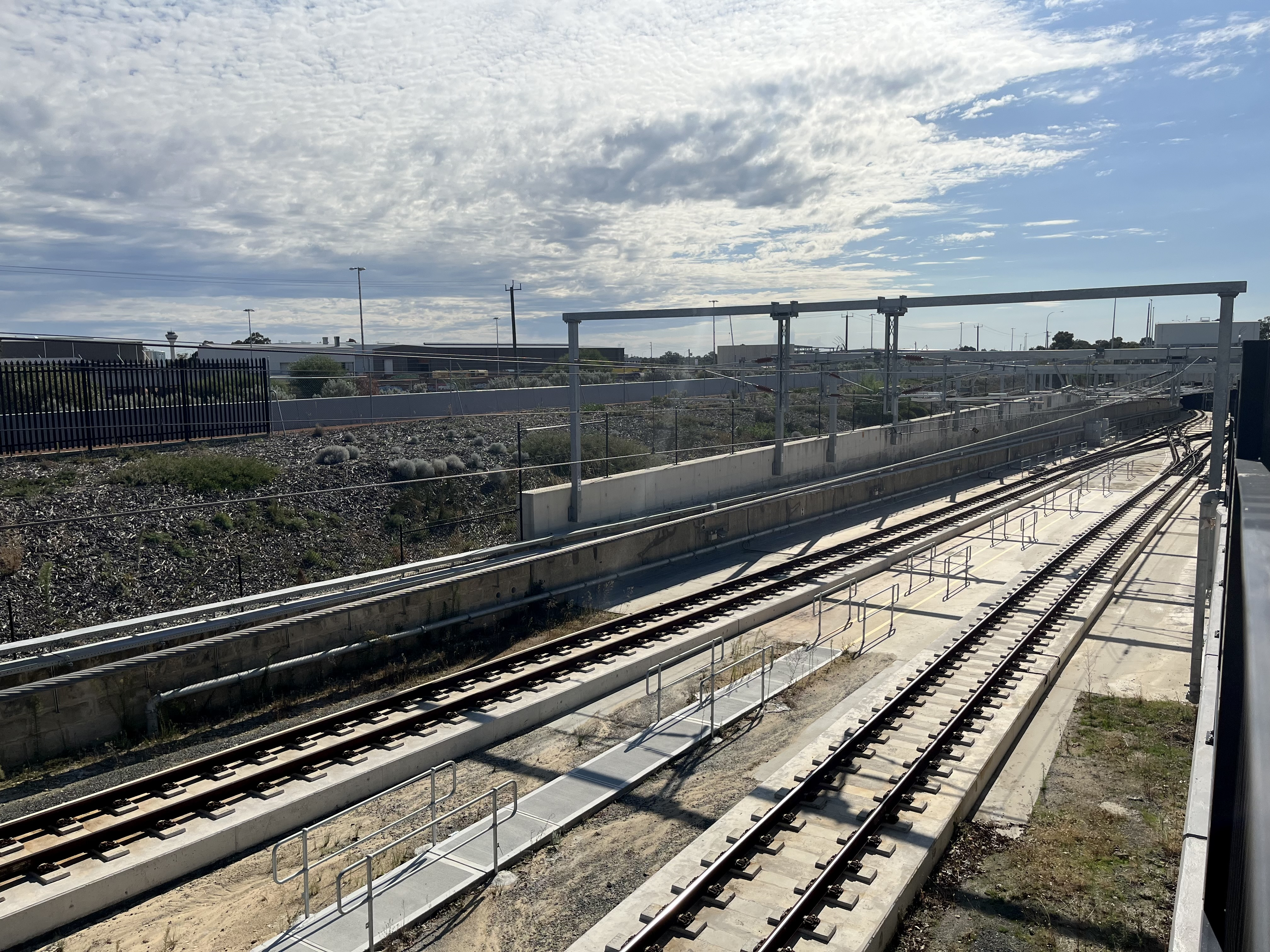
Dive structure just north of High Wycombe station

On 3 November 2016, a sod turning ceremony took place with Premier Colin Barnett, State Transport Minister Bill Marmion, Federal Minister for Urban Infrastructure Paul Fletcher and Federal Minister for Infrastructure and Transport Darren Chester, which marked the start of construction for the Forrestfield–Airport Link. The first priority was the construction of the dive structure so that tunnelling could commence. By the end of 2016, construction had started on the diaphragm walls of the dive structure, and the development application for the actual station was submitted. Artist impressions of the station were released in January 2017. By April 2017, the diaphragm walls were complete which allowed for excavation of the 260-metre (850 ft) long and up to 22-metre (72 ft) wide dive structure to begin. As the Forrestfield site was where the TBMs were to start boring from, the site establishment works involved the construction of infrastructure to support tunnelling operations, including a bentonite plant, water treatment plant, and slurry plant.

In May 2017, the 45 components of the first TBM arrived on site. It had been constructed in China and was assembled on site in High Wycombe. The components of the second TBM arrived by July 2017, and it too was assembled on site. By July 2017, the dive structure was ready for tunnelling to commence. The first TBM, named Grace, was lifted into the dive structure that month and began tunnelling. The second TBM, named Sandy, was lifted into the dive structure in September 2017 and began tunnelling in October 2017.

Construction on the station itself had begun by November 2017. That month, the first of 92 pre-cast concrete retaining wall panels was craned into place. The retaining wall, which involved backfilling to raise the ground level by up to 5 metres (16 ft), was complete by May 2018.

As the site was divided in two by Dundas Road, with the station and dive structure on the west side and the TBM support infrastructure on the east side, 1 kilometre (0.62 mi) of Dundas Road had to be realigned to pass west of the station. Works for that began in February 2018. The realigned road opened in August 2018, and the previous alignment between Maida Vale Road and Imperial Street was closed.

Construction of the foundations for the station's platform began in October 2018. By May 2019, columns to support the concourse above the platforms were in place, and by June 2019, the concourse slab had been poured and the structure for the roof had begun to be built. By July 2019, the escalators were in place and brickwork for the station building had begun. By August 2019, the stairs were in place, and by September 2019, the station was 50 percent complete. By February 2020, the sheeting for the roof was being installed and construction on the traction power supply substation had begun. The roof sheeting was fully installed by April 2020 and by June 2020, the roof skylights were complete. Works on the forecourt, including the bus interchange, were underway by August 2020, and by September 2020, the lifts from the platform to the concourse were installed. By May 2021, tiling of the platform and the concourse was complete. The TBM cutterhead was installed by November 2021.

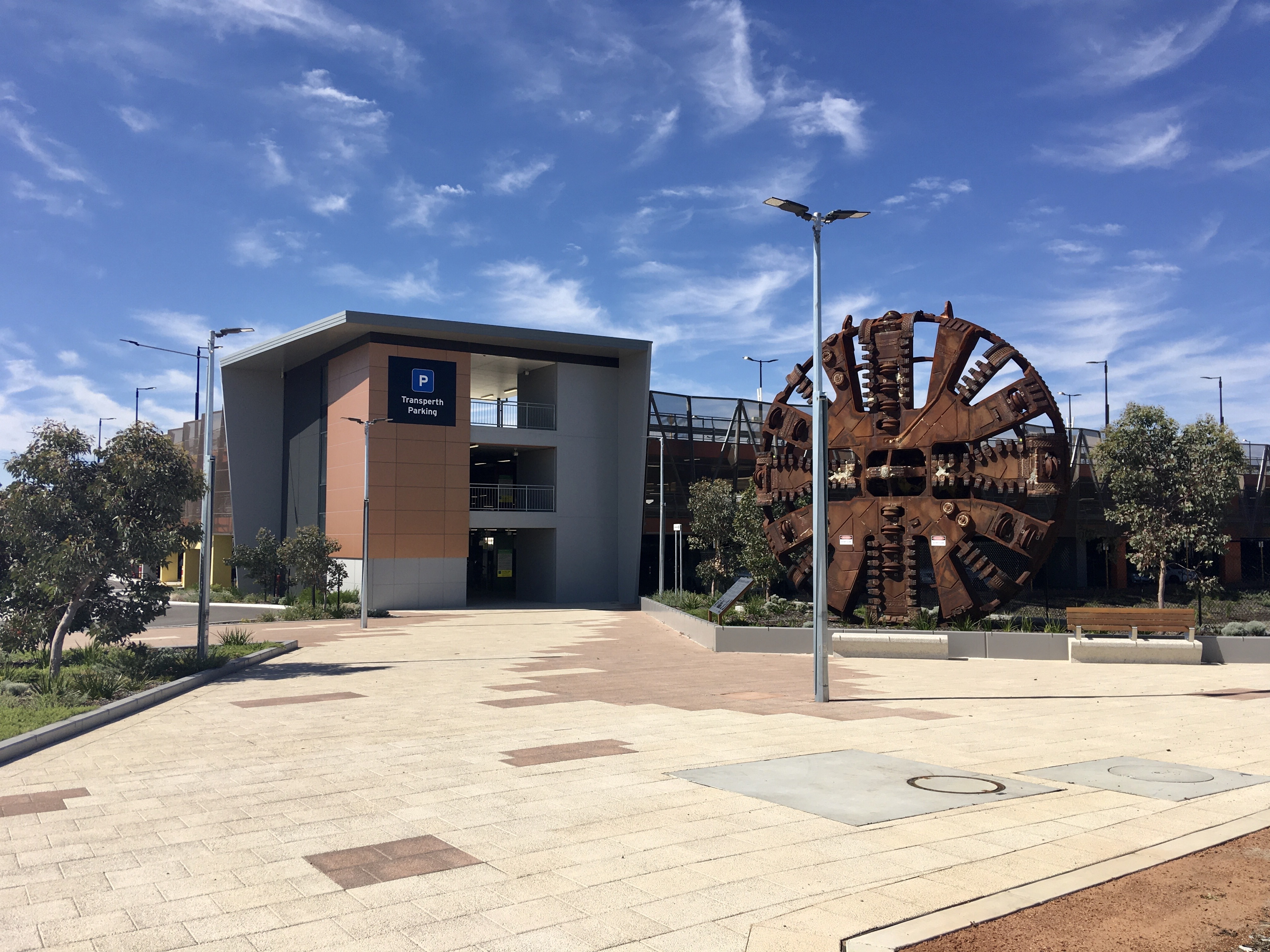
Multi-storey car park with TBM cutterhead in front

In September 2018, it was announced that the Forrestfield–Airport Link contract would be varied so that a 1,200-bay multi-storey car park could be constructed at the station, instead of a large ground-level car park as originally planned. The car park was projected to cost $32 million and be paid for by the project's contingency budget. The change reduced the area dedicated to parking by 8 hectares (20 acres) and was made to allow for transit-oriented development at the station. This came after Shire of Kalamunda President Andrew Waddell had expressed concern at the previously planned 2,500-bay car park, saying that "The PTA plans to build 2,500 car parking bays in front of the station will devastate any plans to develop at the proposed densities". Construction on the car park began in June 2020, and by March 2021, the structure was complete, with fit-out works following that. By July 2021, the car park was complete.

=== Name ===
By 2017, there was a push from local residents for the station to be renamed High Wycombe station to better reflect its actual location. Federal member for Swan Steve Irons and state member for Forrestfield Stephen Price called for the name change, with Price accusing the former Liberal government of naming the station Forrestfield so that it was more likely to retain the marginal electoral district of Forrestfield. The City of Kalamunda called for the name to change to High Wycombe in March 2020. In May 2020, the state government launched a survey for residents and business operators of the City of Kalamunda to have their say on the station's name. The survey closed with over 3,500 votes, 76.1 percent of which were for the station to be named High Wycombe.

=== Opening ===
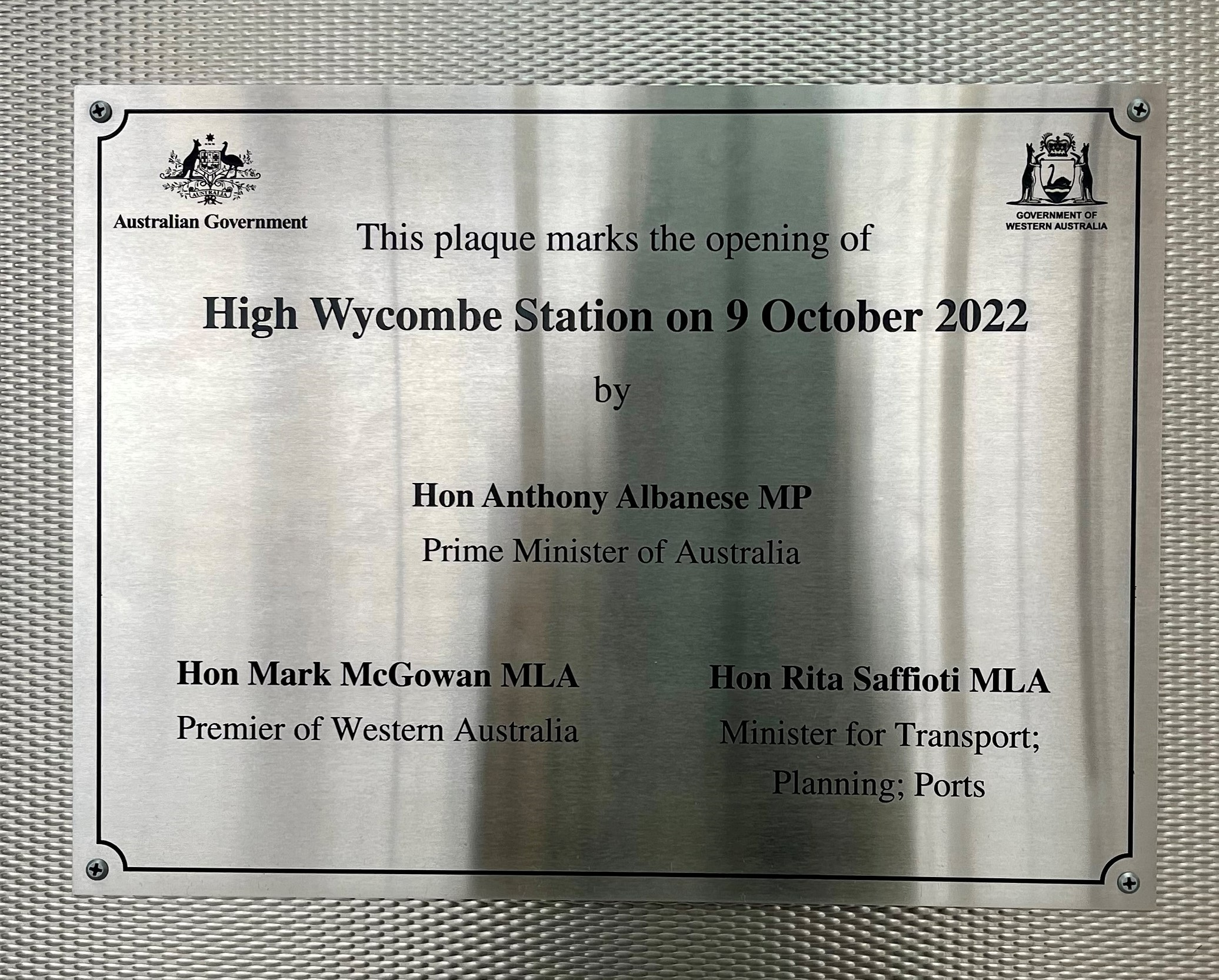
Plaque commemorating the station's opening

On 18 December 2018, state Transport Minister Rita Saffioti announced that the opening date of the project had been delayed from 2020 to 2021. In May 2021, Saffioti announced that the project had been delayed again, this time with the opening date being in the first half of 2022. Following the state budget on 12 May 2022, the government changed its position on the line's opening date, saying it would open some time later in the year. On 16 August, the opening date was revealed to be 9 October 2022. The station was officially opened that day by Prime Minister Anthony Albanese, Premier Mark McGowan, and Transport Minister Saffioti. To celebrate, a community open day was organised for High Wycombe and Redcliffe stations on the day of the opening, which involved live entertainment and food. The new bus services to High Wycombe station commenced the following day.

== Future ==
High Wycombe station was designed to allow for a future extension of the railway south. The Perth and Peel @ 3.5 Million plan states that an extension to link the Airport line to the Thornlie–Cockburn line to form a Circle line should be investigated.

== Services ==
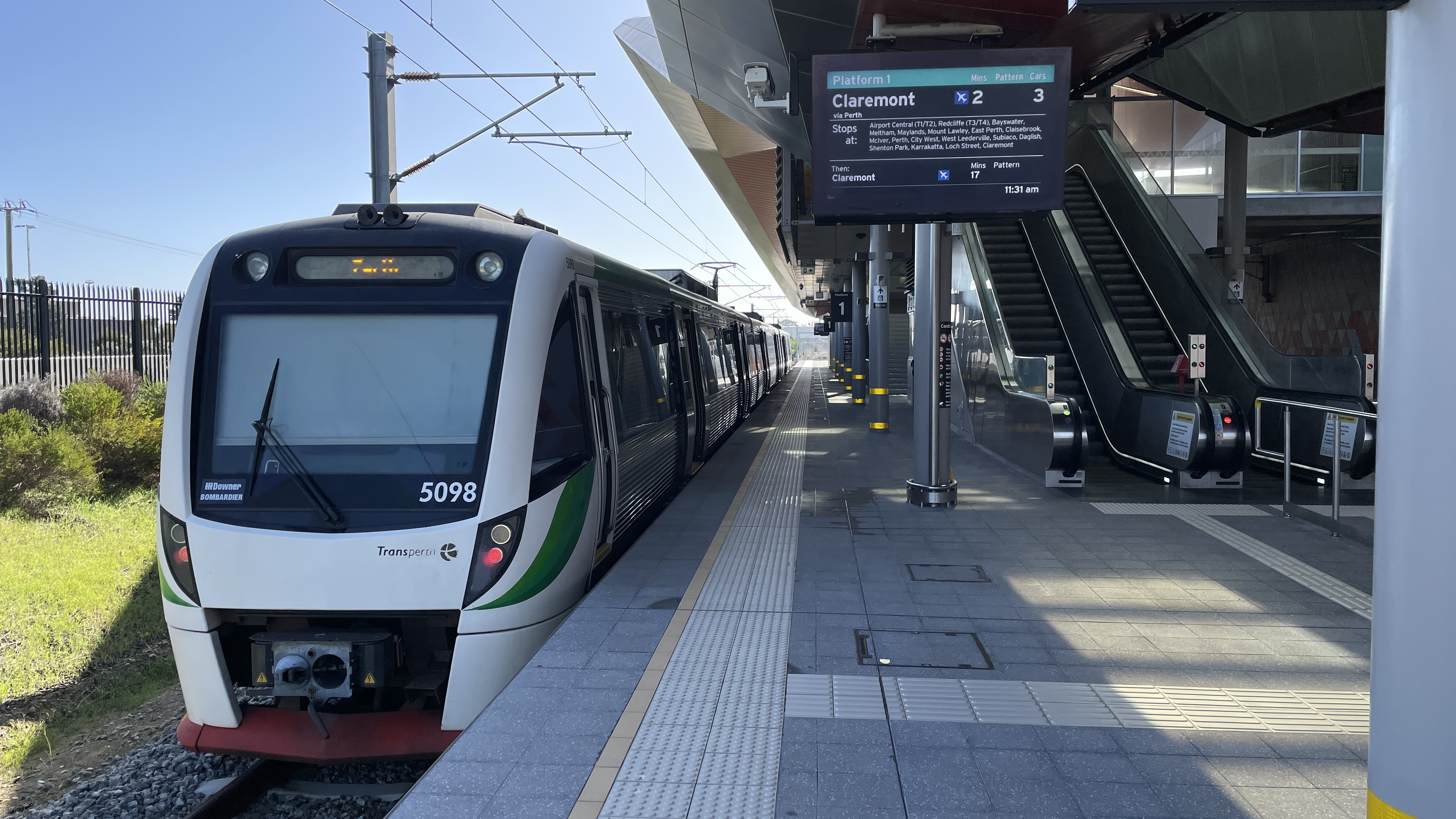
Transperth B-series train on Platform 2

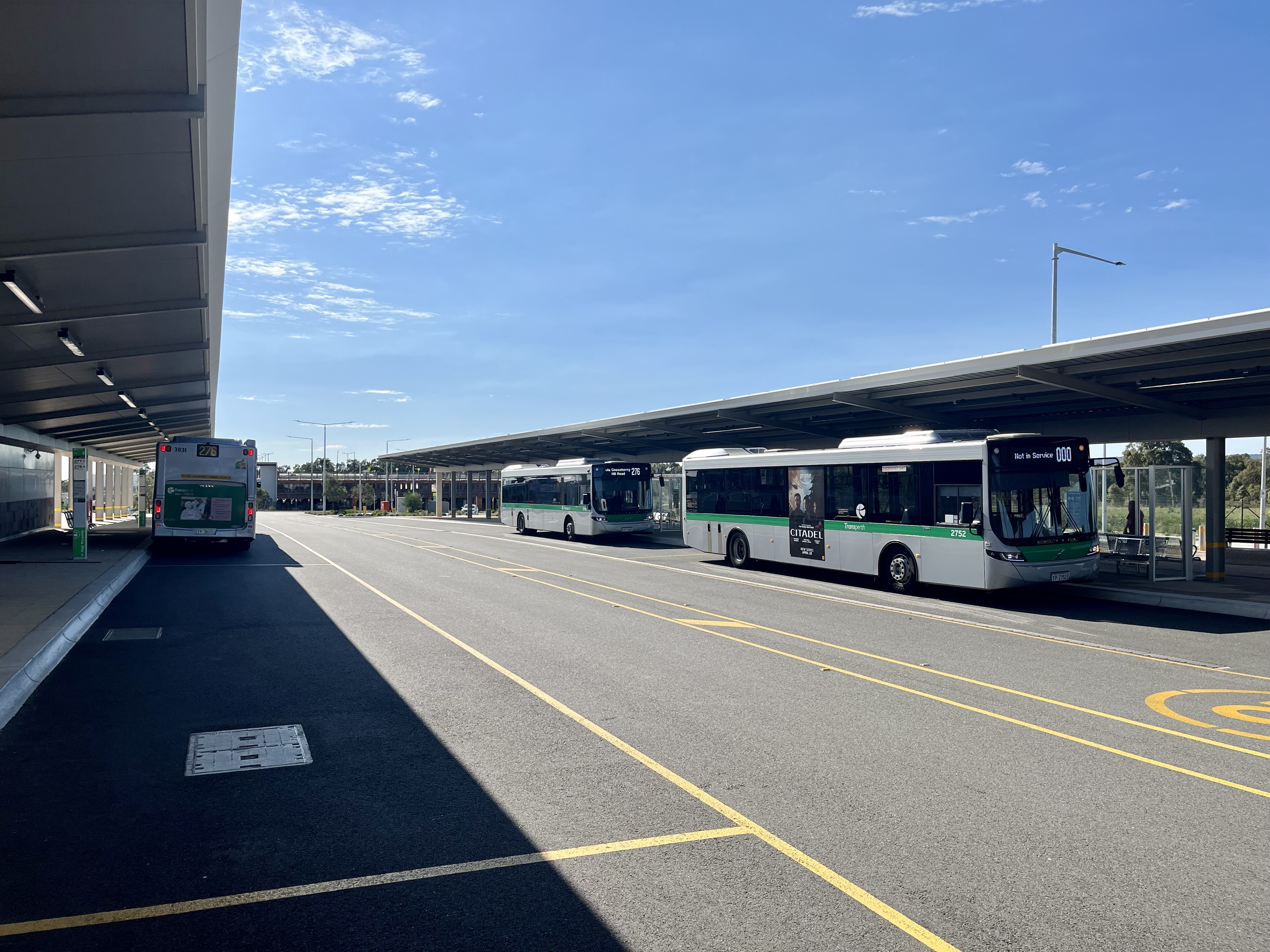
High Wycombe station bus interchange

=== Train services ===
High Wycombe station is served by the Airport line on the Transperth network. These services are operated by the PTA via its Transperth Train Operations division. To the west, the line joins the Midland line two stations along at Bayswater, running along that line to Perth station, before running along the Fremantle line to terminate at Claremont station. Airport line trains depart from the station every twelve minutes during peak on weekdays and every fifteen minutes outside peak and on weekends and public holidays. At night, trains are half-hourly or hourly. The journey to Perth station takes 22 minutes. The station is in fare zone two.

The station was predicted to have an average of 9,800 daily boardings upon opening, rising to 12,000 by 2031. The catchment area includes High Wycombe, Forrestfield, Maida Vale, Gooseberry Hill, and Kalamunda. It was planned that over 90 percent of passengers would arrive at High Wycombe station by car or bus and 50 percent would arrive by bus.

==== Platforms ====
High Wycombe platform arrangement
Stop ID	Platform	Line	Service Pattern	Destination	Via	Notes
99561	1	Airport line	All stations	Claremont	Perth	
99561	1	Airport line	P, FP	Perth		
99562	2	Airport line	All stations	Claremont	Perth	Platform only used during weekday peaks and delays.
99562	2	Airport line	P, FP	Perth		Platform only used during weekday peaks and delays.

=== Bus routes ===
High Wycombe's bus interchange has eight bus stands and eight regular bus routes. Consultation on the bus routes occurred in October and November 2021. Route 270 runs to Elizabeth Quay bus station via Forrestfield, Belmont and Victoria Park transfer station. Route 271 goes to Forrestfield. Route 275 goes to Walliston via Kalamunda bus station. Route 276 goes to Kalamunda bus station via Gooseberry Hill. Routes 277 and 278 go to Midland station. Route 280 goes to Westfield Carousel via Cannington station. Route 293 goes to Redcliffe station via Belmont. Route 294 goes to Foodbank WA. Rail replacement bus services operate as route 902.
