= Roe Highway =

Highway in Perth, Western Australia

Roe Highway Western Australia
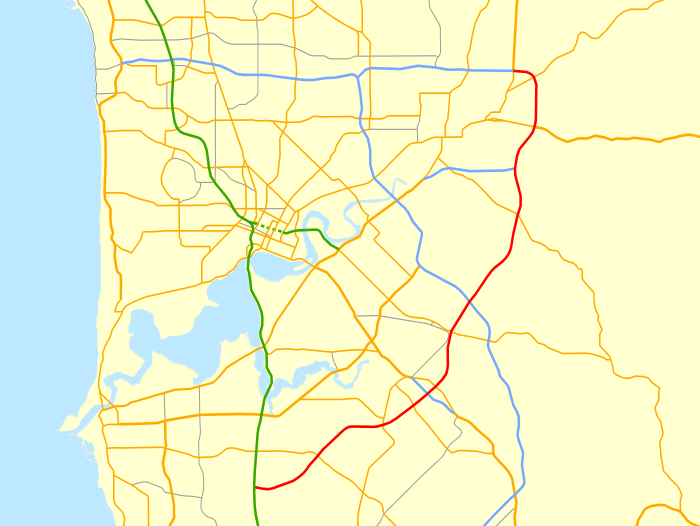
- Map of Perth's central suburbs with Roe Highway highlighted in red

General information
- Type: Highway
- Length: 35 km (22 mi)
- Opened: 1980s
- Route number(s): State Route 3 (All sections); National Highway 95 (Middle Swan – Midvale); National Highway 94 (Midvale – Hazelmere)

Major junctions
- Northeast end: Reid Highway (State Route 3), Middle Swan
- Great Northern Highway (National Highway 95 / National Route 1); Great Eastern Highway (National Highway 94 / State Route 51); Great Eastern Highway Bypass (National Highway 94); Tonkin Highway (State Route 4); Kenwick Link (State Route 30); Kwinana Freeway (State Route 2)
- Southwest end: Murdoch Drive, Bibra Lake

Location(s)
- Major suburbs: Midvale, Hazelmere, Forrestfield, Kewdale, Welshpool, Canning Vale, Leeming, Jandakot

Highway system
- Highways in Australia; National Highway • Freeways in Australia; Highways in Western Australia

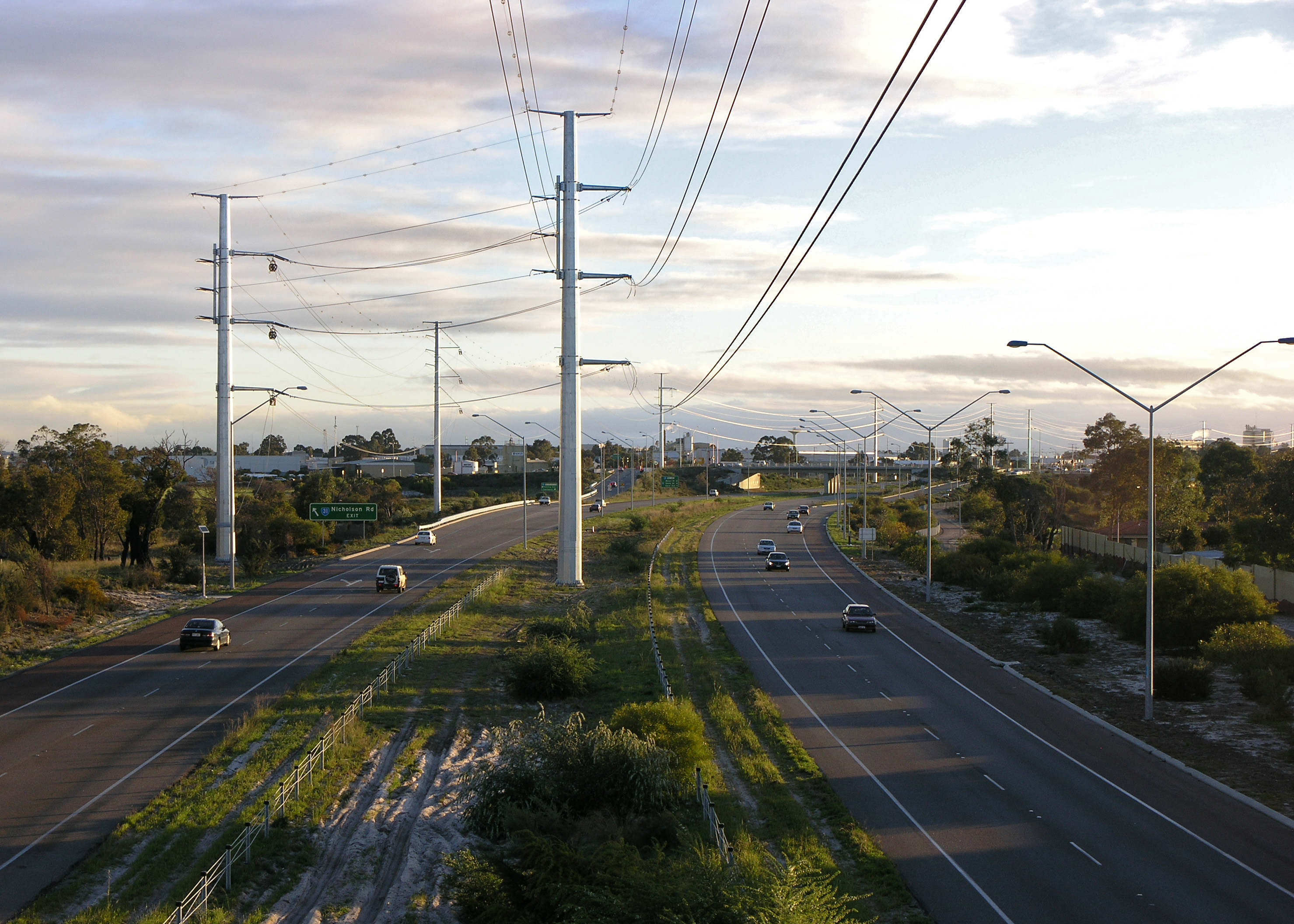
Roe Highway at the Nicholson Road exit

Roe Highway is a 35-kilometre-long (22 mi) limited-access highway and partial freeway in Perth, Western Australia, linking Kewdale with the city's north-eastern and south-western suburbs. The northern terminus is at Reid Highway and Great Northern Highway in Middle Swan, and the southern terminus is with Murdoch Drive at the Kwinana Freeway interchange in Bibra Lake. Roe Highway, in addition to Reid Highway, form State Route 3, a partial ring road around the outer suburbs of the Perth metropolitan area. Roe Highway also forms part of National Highway 94 from Great Eastern Highway Bypass to Great Eastern Highway, and National Highway 95 from Great Eastern Highway to Great Northern Highway.

Although planning for Roe Highway's route began in the 1950s, construction on the highway's first segment only began in 1981, which was opened in 1983, concurrent with the construction of Tonkin Highway and development of the Kewdale industrial area. The highway remains a key heavy vehicle route in the Perth metropolitan area. In the 1980s and 1990s, most of the highway's interchanges with other roads were constructed as at-grade intersections with traffic lights, as were Perth's other arterial highways also constructed during that time. From 2002 to 2006, the 20-kilometre-long (12 mi) section of the highway from Tonkin Highway to Kwinana Freeway was constructed as a continuous freeway, with grade-separated interchanges and free traffic flow, and since 2012 several remaining at-grade intersections of the rest of the highway have been grade-separated. Six at-grade traffic-light controlled intersections remain on the highway today.

Planning provisions have proposed for Roe Highway to be extended from its current south-western terminus in Bibra Lake towards Fremantle since the 1950s. These plans have been controversial amongst conservationist and community groups due to the highway's proposed route through the environmentally sensitive Beeliar Wetlands. The Western Australian state government commenced construction on the first stage of an extension of Roe Highway from Kwinana Freeway to Stock Road (known as Roe Highway Stage 8) in December 2016; construction of the extension was suspended in March 2017 following a change of government in the 2017 state election. The new government has since reconfigured the extension to curve northwards to link with Murdoch Drive instead. Construction on this project commenced in 2018 and was completed in April 2020.

== Route description ==
Driving from Roe Highway northbound, along a looped interchange ramp, to Great Eastern Highway eastbound

Roe Highway is part of State Route 3, Perth's partial outer ring road, though it also carries National Highways 94 and 95 for parts of the highway. A dual carriageway limited-access highway maintained by Main Roads Western Australia, most junctions along the road are grade-separated interchanges, though some are at-grade traffic-light controlled intersections; the 20-kilometre (12 mi) section between Tonkin Highway and the Kwinana Freeway (a little more than half the highway's entire length) is a continuous freeway.

The speed limit for the highway is mostly 100 kilometres per hour (62 mph); however, the section between Great Northern Highway and Morrison Road carries a 90 kilometres per hour (56 mph), and it is 80 kilometres per hour (50 mph) at the Great Eastern Highway Bypass intersection. Otherwise, the speed limit near at-grade intersections is 70 kilometres per hour (43 mph). A principal shared path (PSP) exists alongside most of Roe Highway, from Kalamunda Road to Kwinana Freeway.

=== Middle Swan to Forrestfield ===
Roe Highway commences in Middle Swan within the City of Swan local government area (LGA) at Great Northern Highway at a traffic light controlled intersection as an eastern continuation of Reid Highway. Upon the highway's commencement it is carrying both State Route 3 (continuing from Reid Highway) and National Highway 95 (continuing from Great Northern Highway to the north). The highway then curves to the south, reaching Toodyay Road 1.4 kilometres (0.9 mi) later. From there the highway briefly borders the suburb of Stratton before entering Midvale, reaching another traffic light controlled intersection with Morrison Road 2 kilometres (1.2 mi) later. Only another 900 metres (3,000 ft) takes the highway to Great Eastern Highway at a modified diamond interchange with a northbound to eastbound loop ramp to cater for heavy vehicles. At this interchange, National Highway 95 terminates here, and simultaneously gains the National Highway 94 allocation, continuing from Great Eastern Highway to the east.

Following the Great Eastern Highway interchange Roe Highway is entirely within the suburb of Bellevue, getting to Clayton Street only 800 metres (2,600 ft) further on. It is a half diamond interchange with only a northbound exit and southbound entry ramp. Not any further from that interchange, the highway crosses the Helena River, sending the highway into the suburb of Hazelmere, passing under Bushmead Road, and reaching the Great Eastern Highway Bypass another 2 kilometres (1.2 mi) south of Clayton Street. At this intersection National Highway 95 continues west on the Bypass. After 1.7 kilometres (1.1 mi), Roe Highway enters the City of Kalamunda LGA, bordering the suburbs of High Wycombe and Maida Vale and then reaches Kalamunda Road at a dogbone interchange 1.1 kilometres (0.7 mi) later. Another 1.3 kilometres (0.8 mi) takes the highway to another half diamond interchange at Maida Vale Road, also with only northbound exit and southbound entrance ramps. 2.4 kilometres (1.5 mi) later, Roe Highway reaches Berkshire Road at a diamond interchange with a "tennis ball" configuration, with traffic cutting through the roundabouts rather than circulating around them. At the same time the highway enters the suburb of Forrestfield. Another 2.3 kilometres (1.4 mi) takes the highway to Tonkin Highway. This major junction was originally a diamond interchange favouring Tonkin Highway, but is now a partial freeway-to-freeway interchange, with the left turns from Roe Highway free-flowing. There are plans to upgrade this junction to a fully free-flowing interchange in the future.

=== Forrestfield to Bibra Lake ===
Following the interchange at Tonkin Highway, Roe Highway now forms the boundaries of the City of Belmont and Kalamunda LGAs to the west and east, respectively, as well as their respective suburbs, Kewdale and Wattle Grove, before crossing freight railway lines and briefly entering the suburbs of East Cannington and Welshpool within the vicinity of the Orrong Road and Welshpool Road East interchange, within the City of Gosnells LGA, 1.3 kilometres (0.8 mi) further south from Tonkin Highway. Within this stretch the highway is four lanes southbound and three lanes northbound. Roe Highway is thereafter within the suburb of Beckenham, with the freight railway line travelling alongside the highway's eastern side. Roe Highway reaches Kenwick Link (a bypass of Albany Highway) 4.2 kilometres (2.6 mi) further south. Midway through these interchanges, the highway passes under Brixton Street and the bypassed section of Albany Highway. A further 600 metres (2,000 ft) southwest of the interchange takes the freeway to the Canning River, which Roe Highway crosses over as the Djarlgarra Bridge, after which the highway is now bordering the suburbs of Langford and Thornlie. Roe Highway passes under Spencer Road before reaching Nicholson Road, 2.6 kilometres (1.6 mi) west of the river. The highway, which is now within the City of Canning and bordering the residential suburb of Parkwood and industrial suburb of Canning Vale, reaches Willeri Drive 2.6 kilometres (1.6 mi) further west, after which it is now bordering Willetton to the north, and then reaches South Street 2 kilometres (1.2 mi) further southwest. Following this interchange Roe Highway is now within the City of Cockburn and bordering the suburbs of Leeming and Jandakot, reaching Karel Avenue 3.1 kilometres (1.9 mi) further west. After 900 metres (3,000 ft), Roe Highway reaches a partial combination interchange (originally a trumpet interchange) at the junction of the Kwinana Freeway (this interchange lacks southbound-to-westbound and eastbound-to-northbound movements) in Bibra Lake; Roe Highway terminates at this interchange, continuing northwards as Murdoch Drive.

== History ==
Roe Highway was first proposed in 1955 by Gordon Stephenson as part of what was to become the Metropolitan Region Planning Scheme. The highway was intended to form the southern and eastern sections of a ring route around the Perth metropolitan area. It is named in honour of John Septimus Roe, who arrived in Western Australia in 1829 and served as the first state Surveyor General of Western Australia for 41 years.

Work began in 1981, with the first section between the Beechboro-Gosnells Highway and Bushmead Road opening in 1983. The next section, from Bushmead Road to Great Eastern Highway was opened in 1984. The third stage, linking the Great Eastern Highway and Great Northern Highway opened on 14 December 1988, at the same time as the Great Eastern Highway Bypass opened. The state Minister for Transport, Bob Pearce was assisted in the opening ceremony by Jason and Rachael Roe, two of the sixth generation of the Roe family to live in Australia and descendants of John Septimus Roe. The new roads provided a limited access dual carriageway bypass of the historical Guildford and Midland districts that were much needed at the time.

In 1994, the highway was extended 2 km (1.2 mi) further southwards from Tonkin Highway to Welshpool Road. Following seven years in hiatus, work recommenced, and in 2001 a new 4 km (2 mi) southwestern extension known as stage 4 was completed from Welshpool Road to the purpose-built Kenwick Link (an Albany Highway bypass built in 1998) – most of which replaced the overtaxed William Street in Beckenham. Work on the 3-kilometre-long (1.9 mi) stage 5 was undertaken simultaneously with stage 4, bringing the highway to Nicholson Road in 2002.

Stage 6, a 5 km (3 mi) extension from Nicholson Road to South Street was completed in 2004, with stage 7 being announced shortly afterwards. Prior to 2006, the exit to the freeway from the present Roe Highway Intersection was Hope Road. When the 4.5 km (3 mi), $75 million extension from South Street to Kwinana Freeway was completed in March 2006 (Roe Highway stage 7), this meant that Hope Road was severed to the connection of the freeway with the road east of Berrigan Drive being renamed to Karel Avenue. Hope Road is now a series of local streets with the east of the freeway accessing to the West Power Jandakot Distribution Centre.

The 19 km (12 mi) of road built since 1994 between Tonkin Highway and Kwinana Freeway, is to a freeway standard. It may in the future be upgraded to a freeway classification.

In June 2012, the new grade-separated interchange opened at the Great Eastern Highway intersection, allowing free-flowing traffic on Roe Highway over Great Eastern Highway. The design includes a northbound to eastbound loop ramp to cater for heavy vehicles, and three pedestrian underpasses.

=== Proposal to extend Roe to Fremantle ===
Roe Highway was first proposed in 1955 by Gordon Stephenson as part of what was to become the Metropolitan Region Planning Scheme. The highway was intended to form the southern and eastern sections of a ring route around the Perth metropolitan area. In the 1950s, Stephenson planned for Roe Highway to continue westwards towards Fremantle, through South Fremantle along Marine Terrace and then north to connect with Stirling Highway and the Port of Fremantle. As part of the plan, in 1974 Stirling Highway was extended from its then terminus north of the Swan River southwards to Canning Highway. Over a period of approximately 20 years, Main Roads Western Australia procured land, and in 1985, Stirling Highway was extended southwards from Canning Highway to High Street (the western continuation of Leach Highway). The remaining 3 km (1.9 mi) strip of land south of High Street then became known as the Fremantle Eastern Bypass.

At the southern end of the proposed Fremantle Eastern Bypass, an 8 km (5 mi) east–west road reservation was proclaimed, and became known as Roe Highway stage 8 (or Roe 8). With a change of state governments in 2001, the planned Fremantle Eastern Bypass / Roe Highway stage 8 was cancelled, with a commitment by the government to sell the land reserved for the Fremantle Eastern Bypass. As part of the funding arrangement for Roe Highway stages 6 and 7, the federal government stipulated that the Roe Highway stage 8 reservation was to be retained.

Following a change in state governments in September 2008, planning work commenced on an extension of Roe Highway from Kwinana Freeway to Stock Road. Parliamentary debate continued in 2012 as the state government continued its intention to implement the plan.

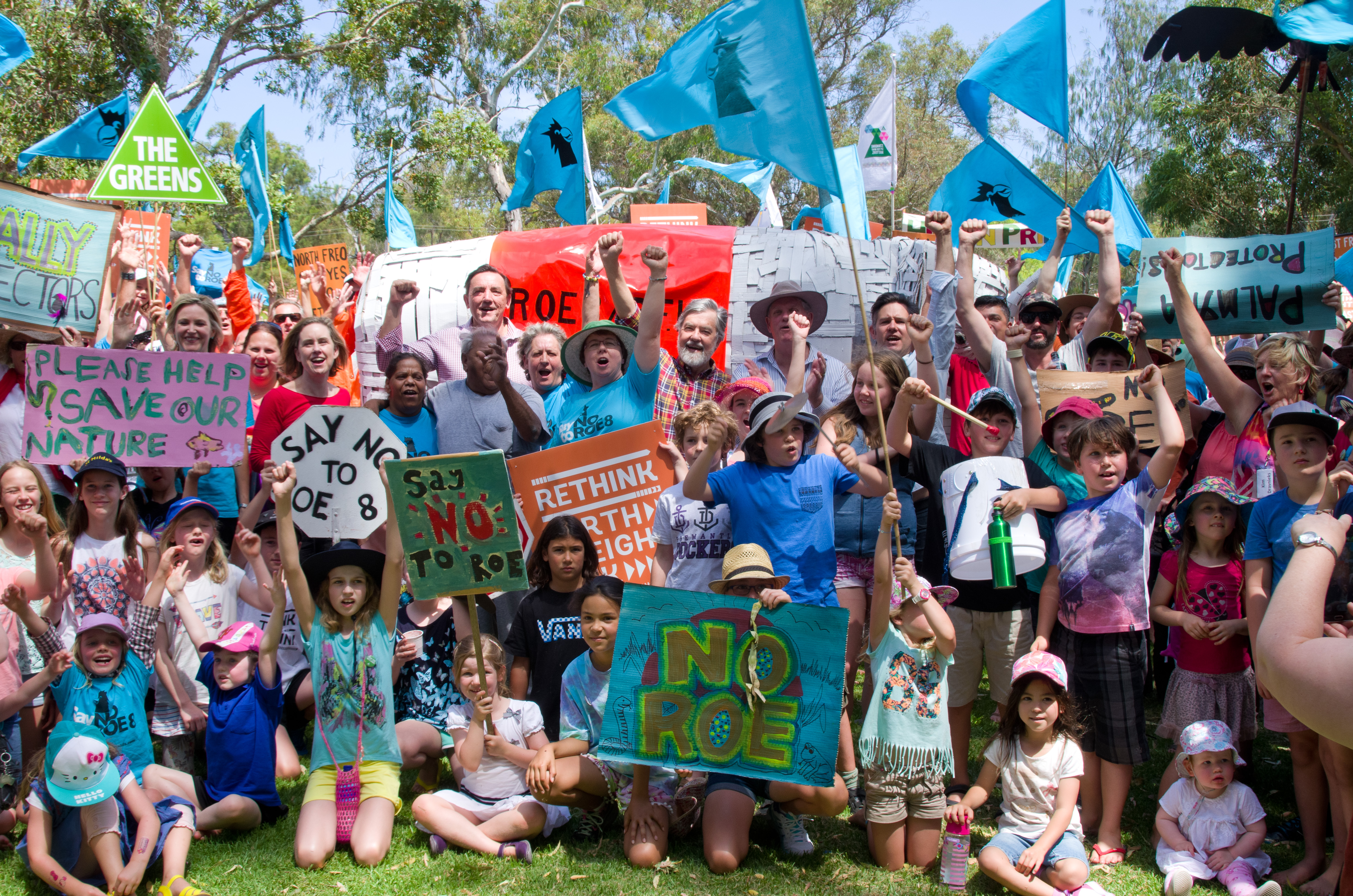
Protesters against Roe 8

The plan was ultimately formalised as The Perth Freight Link in May 2014, a $1.6 billion project to improve the road freight link between Kewdale and Fremantle Harbour. In addition to the 5 km (3.1 mi) extension of Roe Highway, upgrades were also planned for Stock Road, Leach Highway, and High Street to provide a grade-separated route, bypassing fourteen sets of traffic signals. The plan included mandatory GPS tracking of all vehicles over an undisclosed size or weight with a charge per kilometre applied for vehicles travelling in the area between Muchea and North Fremantle. The extension would have taken the highway from its current terminus at Kwinana Freeway approximately 5 km (3.1 mi) further west to Stock Road, near Forrest Road in Coolbellup. The proposed route was along or within the vicinity of an existing road reserve in the Perth Metropolitan Region Scheme.

In September 2015 the group Save the Beeliar Wetlands took legal action against the Environmental Protection Agency (EPA), arguing that the EPA did not follow its own policies. Preliminary works began on the project during November 2015, which drew protests with many people being given move-on orders preventing them from being in the area. On 16 December 2015 the Supreme Court handed down its findings: that because the EPA did not follow its published policies as it was legally obliged to, the approval of Roe 8 and the subsequent approval given by the environment minister Albert Jacobs were invalid.

Noongar custodian Corina Abraham, on behalf of the local Whadjuk Noongar people filed writs against members of the Department of Aboriginal Affairs cultural committee and the current WA Minister for Aboriginal Affairs Peter Collier in the WA Supreme Court on 30 March 2016. The writs allege that they did not receive procedural fairness as both Abraham and her now deceased father were part of the group consulted in the original group consulted in the report which the committee later overturned to enable the project's approval. Abraham's lawyer Greg McIntyre QC (who had also been Eddie Mabo's lawyer) also sought an injunction to prevent the minister making any decisions based on the new recommendation until the matter is heard by the court.

=== 2017 state election and the Murdoch Drive Connection ===
After the 2017 state election, the incoming McGowan Government stated it intended to scrap the entire project. On 12 March, Main Roads and the contractors agreed to suspend work on the project.

In early 2018 plans were revealed to extend Roe Highway to curve northwards to meet Murdoch Drive instead, with modifications made to the existing Kwinana Freeway interchange, converting it from a trumpet to a modified combination interchange though with no access from Kwinana Freeway south to Murdoch Drive west nor Murdoch Drive east to Kwinana Freeway north due to the nearby Farrington Road interchange providing the same required movements to enter/exit the freeway. A modified half diamond interchange between Murdoch Drive and Farrington Road/Bibra Drive was also constructed to provide an upgraded southern access to the Murdoch activity centre. The project was completed on 20 April 2020.

=== Gateway WA ===
Gateway WA was a $1 billion project that upgraded the road network around Perth Airport. It was, at the time, the largest project Main Roads Western Australia had ever undertaken, covering the upgrade of Tonkin, Leach, and Roe Highways, and the construction of four new interchanges. The project was jointly funded by state and federal governments, which provided $317.5 million and $686.4 million respectively.

As part of the project, Roe Highway's interchange with Tonkin Highway was upgraded, noise walls were erected along Roe Highway in High Wycombe, and a new interchange between Roe Highway and Berkshire Road was constructed. The project was completed in April 2016.

=== Karel Avenue Interchange Upgrade ===
Work commenced in July 2019 to widen Karel Avenue to four lanes between Farrington Road and Berrigan Drive, including duplication of the bridge crossing the Roe Highway. Despite the interchange itself only opening in 2006, the $15 million upgrade was required due to the development of the Jandakot City project to the south of the interchange along with the construction of the Thornlie-Cockburn Link. This is due for completion in mid-2021.

=== Kalamunda Road Interchange ===
The $86 million project to convert the intersection of Roe Highway and Kalamunda Road to a dogbone interchange started in September 2019 as part of the progressive removal of at-grade signalised intersections along Roe Highway. This was formally completed in September 2021. A staged extension of the Principal Shared Path (PSP) is also being built between the existing Berkshire and future Kalamunda Road interchanges. The Berkshire–Maida Vale Road section was completed in September 2020, while the Maida Vale–Kalamunda section opened in tandem with the interchange itself.

== Future ==
=== Great Eastern Highway Bypass Interchange ===
Planning and development of an interchange between Roe Highway and the Great Eastern Highway Bypass is also underway as part of a wider upgrade of infrastructure in the Hazelmere industrial area. Once completed there will be just two sets of traffic light intersections south of the Great Eastern Highway.

== Interchanges and intersections ==
LGA	Location	km	mi	Destinations	Notes
Swan	Middle Swan	0	0.0	Great Northern Highway (National Highway 95 north / National Route 1 / Tourist Drive 203) – Midland, Moora, Geraldton, Meekatharra	Highway terminus: continues west as Reid Highway (State Route 3). National Highway 95 concurrency terminus: continues north. Traffic light controlled intersection; proposed single-point interchange (SPUI)
Swan	Middle Swan, Stratton	1.4	0.87	Toodyay Road (State Route 50) – Midland, Toodyay, Swan District Hospital	Traffic light controlled intersection; proposed overpass
Swan, Mundaring	Midvale	3.4	2.1	Morrison Road – Midland, Swan View	Traffic light controlled intersection; proposed partial interchange (southbound exit and northbound entrance)
Swan, Mundaring	Midvale	4.3	2.7	Great Eastern Highway (National Highway 94 east / State Route 51 west) – Midland, Northam, Kalgoorlie	Modified diamond interchange with northbound to eastbound loop ramp. National Highway 95 terminus. National Highway 94 concurrency terminus: continues east.
Swan	Bellevue	5.1	3.2	Clayton Street – Bellevue, Midland	Northbound exit and southbound entry only
Swan	Hazelmere	7.1	4.4	Great Eastern Highway Bypass – Perth City, Perth Airport	National Highway 94 concurrency terminus: continues west; Traffic light controlled T junction; To be replaced with a trumpet interchange with construction to start in late 2021/early 2022.
Kalamunda	High Wycombe, Maida Vale	9.9	6.2	Kalamunda Road (State Route 41) – High Wycombe, Kalamunda	Dogbone interchange, formerly a traffic light controlled intersection
Kalamunda	High Wycombe, Maida Vale	11.2	7.0	Maida Vale Road – High Wycombe, Maida Vale	Northbound exit and southbound entry only. Access to High Wycombe railway station.
Kalamunda	Forrestfield	13.6– 13.7	8.5– 8.5	Berkshire Road – Forrestfield	Diamond interchange
Kalamunda	Kewdale, Forrestfield, Wattle Grove	16.0– 16.2	9.9– 10.1	Tonkin Highway (State Route 4) – Armadale, Kewdale, Joondalup, Perth Airport	Modified hybrid diamond interchange (partial freeway-to-freeway interchange): Tonkin Highway free-flowing, southbound exit to Roe Highway westbound free-flowing
Kalamunda	Kewdale	16.8	10.4	Chisholm Crescent – Kewdale	Closed in January 2016, previously a LILO T junction (north-eastbound access only)
Gosnells	East Cannington, Welshpool	18.1	11.2	Orrong Road northwest bound (State Route 8) / Welshpool Road East southeast bound (State Route 8) – Lesmurdie, Welshpool, Perth City	
Gosnells	Beckenham	22.3	13.9	Kenwick Link (State Route 30) – Armadale, Cannington, Perth City	
Gosnells	Beckenham, Kenwick, Langford, Thornlie	22.9– 23.0	14.2– 14.3	Djarlgarra Bridge (over Canning River)	
Gosnells, Canning	Lynwood, Langford, Thornlie, Canning Vale	25.6	15.9	Nicholson Road (State Route 31) – Cannington, Canning Vale	
Canning	Lynwood, Willetton	28.2	17.5	Willeri Drive – Canning Vale, Riverton	
Canning	Leeming	30.2	18.8	South Street (State Route 13) – Armadale, Bull Creek, Canning Vale	
Cockburn	Jandakot	33.3	20.7	Karel Avenue – Leeming, Jandakot, Jandakot Airport	Dogbone interchange
Cockburn	Bibra Lake, Jandakot, North Lake	34.2– 34.8	21.3– 21.6	Kwinana Freeway (State Route 2) – Mandurah, Fremantle, Perth City	Highway terminus: continues west as Murdoch Drive. Partial combination interchange, Roe-West to Kwinana-North and Murdoch-East to Kwinana-South ramps looped. No connection available for Kwinana-South to Murdoch-West nor Murdoch east to Kwinana-North.
1.000 mi = 1.609 km; 1.000 km = 0.621 mi: Closed/former; Concurrency terminus; Incomplete access

== See also ==
- Highways in Australia
- Highways in Western Australia
- Freeways in Australia
- Freeways in Western Australia
