= Kenwick Link =

Road in Perth, Western Australia

Kenwick Link Western Australia

General information
- Type: Highway
- Length: 3.29 km (2.0 mi)
- Opened: 1998
- Route number(s): State Route 30

Major junctions
- North-west end: Albany Highway (State Route 30); William Street
- Roe Highway (State Route 3); Royal Street
- South-east end: Albany Highway (State Route 30); Austin Avenue

Location(s)
- Major suburbs: Beckenham, Kenwick

Highway system
- Highways in Australia; National Highway • Freeways in Australia; Highways in Western Australia

Kenwick Link is a major road in Perth, Western Australia that bypasses Albany Highway in Beckenham and Kenwick. It is part of State Route 30, while the bypassed section of Albany Highway is allocated Alternate State Route 30. The road also provides access to Roe Highway, which does not connect to Albany Highway. It is a controlled-access road for its entire length, with a grade-separated interchange at Roe Highway, and at-grade intersections elsewhere, including traffic lights at Royal Street and both Albany Highway junctions. Main Roads Western Australia maintains and controls all of Kenwick Link, and uses the internal designation Highway H22 Wimbledon–Rupert Street Link.

Kenwick Link was planned as part of the Roe Highway extension towards Fremantle. It was initially built as a single carriageway, and upgraded to a dual carriageway later. It opened on 17 April 1998, ahead of the Roe Highway extensions from Welshpool Road to Kenwick Link (opened 30 November 2002) and from Kenwick Link to Nicholson Road (opened 21 January 2003). Rupert Street was renamed Kenwick Link as part of the project, although a parallel service road in Kenwick is named Rupert Street.

Building the link required demolition of Packer House, a recognised heritage site that was located at 25 Rupert Street, Kenwick. During construction, an artefact of significance to Aboriginal heritage was uncovered: a maparn stone, used by men in a rain-bringing ceremony. The stone is now in the possession of the Dumbartung Aboriginal Corporation at Clontarf Aboriginal College.

== Major intersections ==
All intersections listed below are controlled by traffic lights.

LGA	Location	km	mi	Destinations	Notes
Gosnells	Beckenham	0.0	0.0	Albany Highway (State Route 30 west; Alternate State Route 30 east) – Perth, Cannington, Welshpool, Kenwick	Route transition, northwestern terminus of Kenwick Link, continues northbound as William Street
Gosnells	Beckenham	1.3– 1.5	0.81– 0.93	Roe Highway (State Route 3) – Fremantle, Midland, Rockingham	Diamond interchange. Roe Highway free-flowing
Gosnells	Kenwick	2.3	1.4	Royal Street – Thornlie	
Gosnells	Kenwick–Maddington boundary	3.3	2.1	Albany Highway (State Route 30 east; Alternate State Route 30 west) – Beckenham, Gosnells, Armadale, Albany	Route transition, southeastern terminus of Kenwick Link, continues northbound as Austin Avenue
1.000 mi = 1.609 km; 1.000 km = 0.621 mi: Route transition; Note: Intersections with minor local roads are not shown
