= Wattle Grove, Western Australia =

Wattle Grove
- Suburb
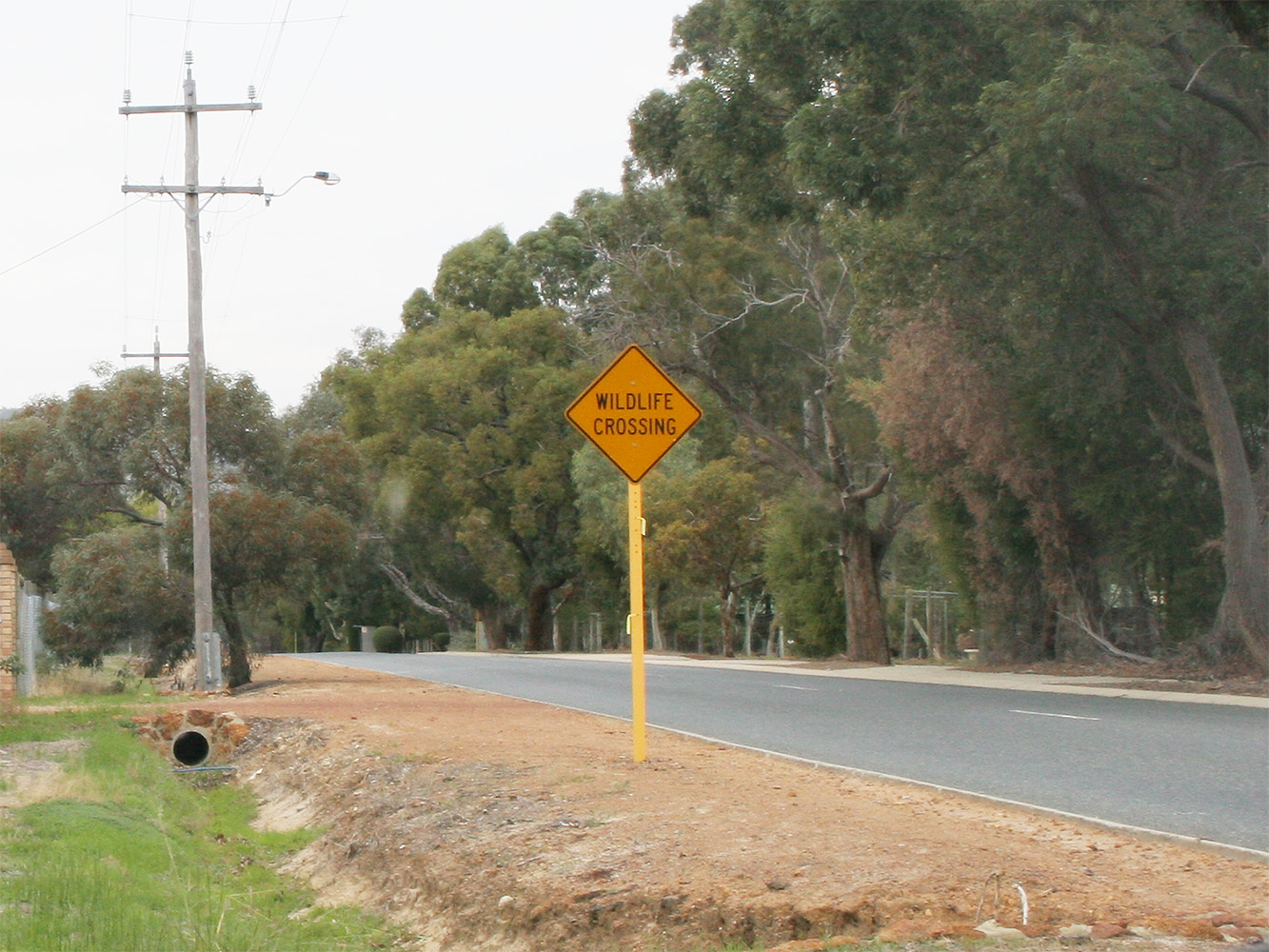
- Crystal Brook Road, Wattle Grove
- Interactive map of Wattle Grove
- Coordinates: 32.008°S 116.014°E
- Country: Australia
- State: Western Australia
- City: Perth
- LGA: City of Kalamunda
- Location: 13 km (8.1 mi) E of Perth, Western Australia

Government
  - State electorates: Forrestfield; Kalamunda
  - Federal division: Bullwinkel

Population
  - Total: 6,547 (SAL 2021)
- Postcode: 6107
Suburbs around Wattle Grove
East Cannington	Welshpool	Perth Airport
Beckenham	Wattle Grove	Forrestfield
Orange Grove	Kenwick	Lesmurdie

Wattle Grove is a suburb of Perth, Western Australia, located within the City of Kalamunda.

== Description ==
Wattle Grove is approximately 2/3 semi-rural, and 1/3 suburban development. It contains some of Hartfield Park, and extends from Crystal Brook Road to Roe Highway. Major transport routes through the suburb are Welshpool Road, Hale Road, Tonkin Highway and Roe Highway.

== Public transport ==
=== Bus ===
- 279 Kalamunda Bus Station to Maddington Central – serves Kelvin Road
- 280 High Wycombe Station to Westfield Carousel – serves Hale Road
- 281 Darling Range Sports College to Lesmurdie Senior High School – serves Hardey East Road, St John Road, Wimbridge Road, Arthur Road, Bruce Road and Welshpool Road
- 282 Kalamunda Bus Station to Oats Street Station – serves Welshpool Road
- 283 Kalamunda Bus Station to Oats Street Station – serves Crystal Brook Road and Welshpool Road

== Facilities ==
Playgrounds are located throughout the new subdivisions in the suburb, as well as walking and bike paths leading to newly created artificial lakes.

Wattle Grove is served by Wattle Grove Primary School, and a Community TAFE Centre in Lewis Road and the Bible College of Western Australia. The primary school built on the area bordered by St John Road, Tomah Road, and Acastus Road opened to students in 2011. The previous primary school on Welshpool Road was mothballed with no alternative usage envisioned.

Hartfield Recreation Centre, located nearby, provides gymnasium facilities as well as opportunities for playing AFL football, rugby league, soccer, baseball, cricket and tennis. Hartfield Park also contains the Darling Range Horse and Pony Club, the Hartfield Country Club (golf course), boy scouts, and car club rooms.

Wattle Grove is well connected to other regions of Perth due to its proximity to the Roe Highway and Tonkin Highway. The most direct route to the Perth central business district is via Welshpool and Shepperton Roads (12 km or 7.5 mi all in 60 km/h or 37 mph zones), however alternative routes are available via Orrong Road / Graham Farmer Freeway (14 km or 8.7 mi in 70 and 80 km/h or 43 and 50 mph zones), Tonkin Highway / Great Eastern Highway (18 km or 11 mi in 60 and 100 km/h or 37 and 62 mph zones), and Roe Highway / Kwinana Freeway (23 km or 14 mi all in 100 km/h or 62 mph zone and the only route without traffic lights).

Wattle Grove has one major retail facility within its boundaries, containing Aldi, 7-Eleven and various other stores e.g. a bakery, a sushi shop and a gym. It has two vets, a motel, a number of nurseries, landscape suppliers, agistment paddocks, boarding kennels and a bird, fish and reptile shop.

The nearest police station is at Forrestfield, and public hospitals are available at Bentley and Kalamunda.

== History ==
Prior to European settlement the Beeloo Whadjuk people occupied much of Wattle Grove. In 1827 the colonial botanist Charles Fraser and Captain James Stirling explored the region to evaluate its suitability for farming. Initially the area was used for forestry and orchards; fruit growing continues to be one of the major industries in Wattle Grove, Bickley and Orange Grove today. This suburb name may have come from a property that was in the area around 1920, or the name may have come about in the early 1900s from wattle trees that lined Welshpool Road; the district was described by the European settlers as "where the groves of wattle are". Much of Wattle Grove has developed into other agricultural uses such as poultry farms, equestrian studs, agistment paddocks, horticultural nurseries, pet kennels, hobby farms and cattle breeders. Twenty residents of Wattle Grove were killed in action during World War I, five of whom were from the same family.

== Notable people ==
- David Birnie, serial killer

== Recent events ==
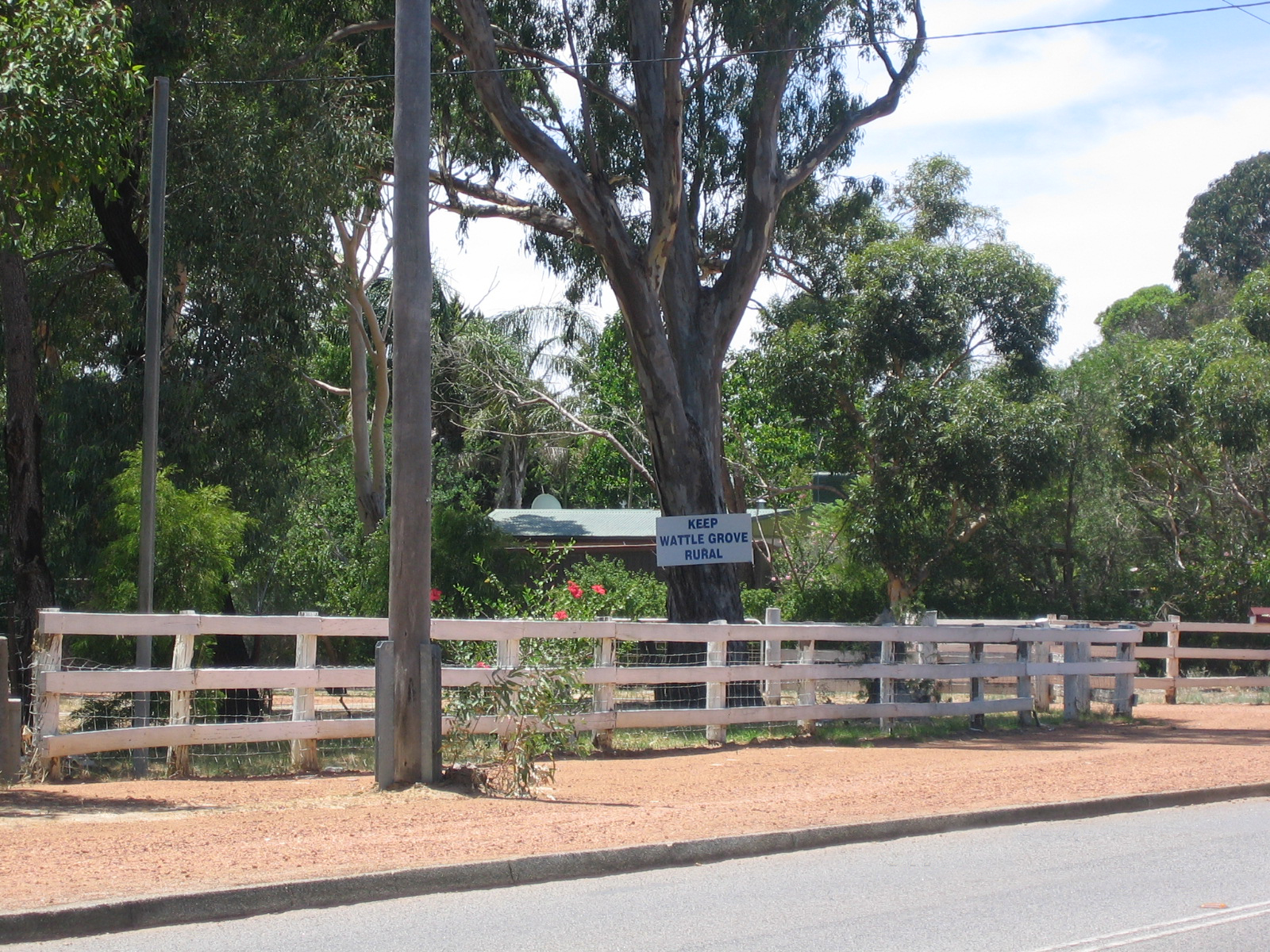
"Keep Wattle Grove rural" protest sign

After a concerted campaign was lost during the 1980s by the Save our Foothills action group a quarter of the suburb bounded by Welshpool Road, Tonkin Highway and Roe Highway has been rezoned as "urban development" by what was then the Shire of Kalamunda and is known as cell 9 in the Kalamunda Shire Plans. This area of Wattle Grove is now a hive of activity as land is subdivided and houses built. The price of land in cell 9 has subsequently risen exponentially since the first subdivision in 1999.
