= Welshpool railway station, Perth =

Railway station in Perth, Western Australia

Welshpool
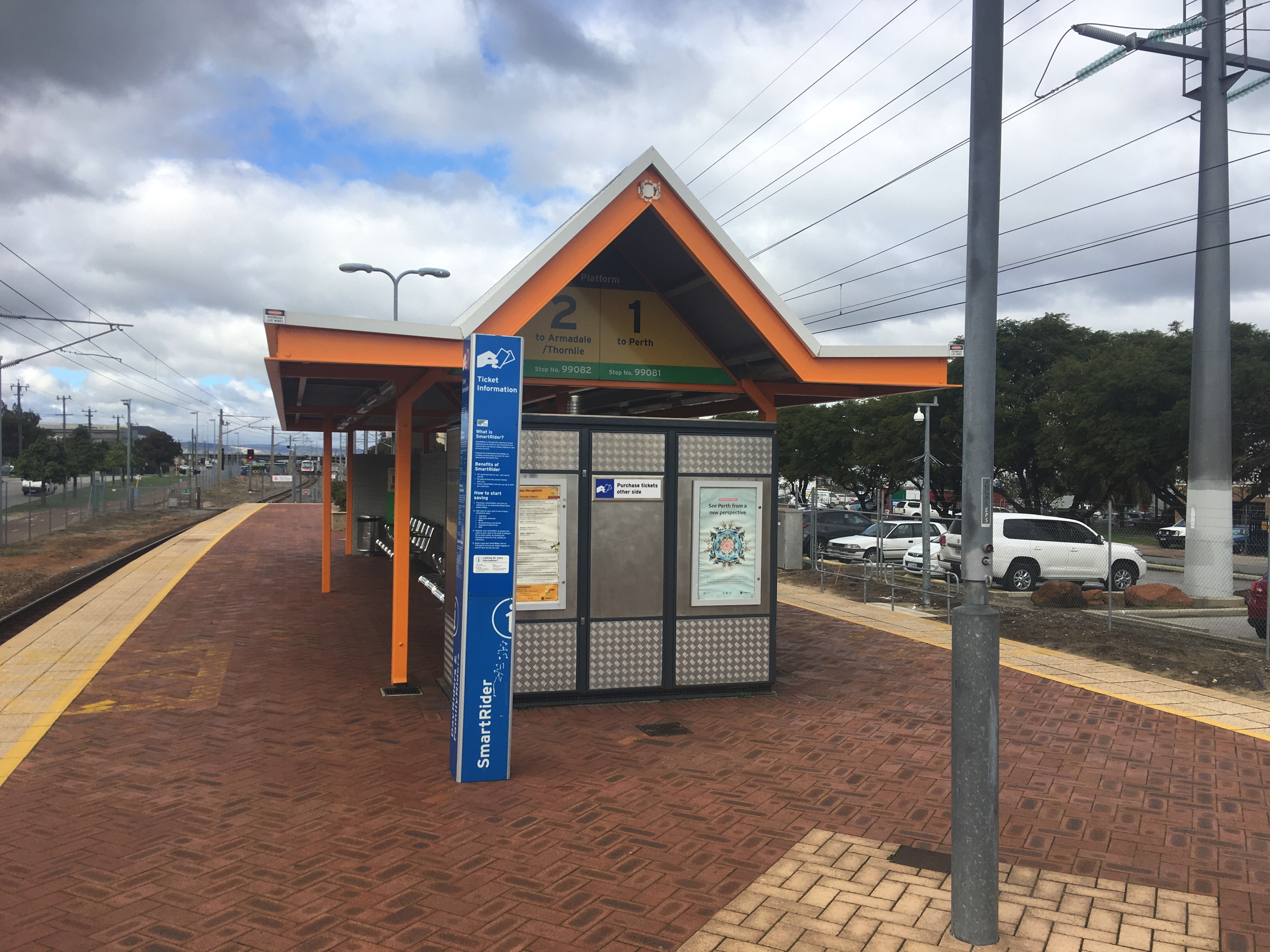
- The station in 2021, 2 years before its closure

General information
- Location: Sevenoaks Street, Welshpool/Bentley; Australia
- Coordinates: 31°59′43″S 115°55′24″E
- Owner: Public Transport Authority
- Operator: Transperth Train Operations
- Lines: Armadale line; Thornlie Line
- Distance: 9.5 kilometres from Perth
- Platforms: 2 (1 island)
- Tracks: 2

Construction
- Structure type: Ground

Other information
- Station code: AWL; 99081 (platform 1); 99082 (platform 2)
- Fare zone: 1

History
- Opened: 1889
- Closed: 20 November 2023

Passengers
- 2013–14: 116,681

Services
Preceding station	Transperth	Following station
Oats Street towards Perth	Armadale line All Stops	Queens Park towards Armadale
Oats Street towards Perth	Thornlie Line T	Queens Park towards Thornlie
Location
- Location of Welshpool railway station

Welshpool was a railway station on the Transperth network. It was located on the Armadale and Thornlie lines, 9.5 kilometres from Perth Station serving the suburbs of Welshpool and Bentley, Western Australia.

The station closed permanently on 20 November 2023, as part of the Victoria Park-Canning Level Crossing Removal Project. The reasons for this included: building a much-needed rail overpass for Welshpool Road which required demolition of the existing station; low patronage of Welshpool Station; and the proximity of Leach Highway making construction of a new station unviable.

== History ==
Welshpool Station opened in 1889 as one of the original stations on the Armadale line. As early as the 1930s the location was concern for railway crossing safety.

During the Second World War, it was considered as a suitable location for a proposed munitions factory.

Welshpool Station was planned to be closed under the original 1999 South West Metropolitan Railway Master Plan for the Armadale line branch route of the Mandurah line to enable the construction of a bridge over Welshpool Road instead of the current level crossing. However, with the change in route alignment, the closure was no longer necessary at that point in time.

== Closure ==
The station closed on 20 November 2023 as part of a Metronet project for the removal of level crossings on the Armadale line. The project included removal of the Welshpool Road level crossing. Because Welshpool Station adjoined the Welshpool Road level crossing, it would have been difficult to build a rail overpass to replace the level crossing, without permanent closure of the station. Low patronage – relatively few passengers boarding and alighting from trains at Welshpool – also played a part in the decision to close the station. The aforementioned factors, as well as the proximity of an existing road bridge for Leach Highway (less than 500 metres south of the former station) made construction of a new, relocated station unviable.

== Services ==
Welshpool Station was served by Transperth Armadale and Thornlie line services. Usually, Armadale Line trains skipped the station with the station being primarily served by Thornlie Line trains. However, on Sundays and at night the station was additionally served by Armadale Line trains.

The station saw 116,681 passengers in the 2013-14 financial year.

== Platforms ==
Welshpool Station platforms
Stop	Platform	Line	Stopping pattern	Destination	Notes
99081	1	Armadale and Thornlie lines	All stations, T	Perth	
99082	2	Armadale	All stations	Armadale	
99082	2	Thornlie	T	Thornlie	
