= Orrong Road =

Road in Perth, Western Australia

Orrong Road Western Australia

General information
- Type: Road
- Length: 8.1 km (5.0 mi)
- Opened: 1937
- Route number(s): State Route 8 (entire length)

Major junctions
- North-West end: Great Eastern Highway (National Highway 94 / National Route 1); Graham Farmer Freeway (State Route 8); Burswood / Lathlain / Rivervale, Perth
- Wright Street; Oats Street; Leach Highway (State Route 7); Kewdale Road; McDowell Street
- South-East end: Roe Highway (State Route 3); Welshpool Road East (State Route 8); East Cannington / Welshpool, Perth

Location(s)
- Major suburbs: Lathlain, Rivervale, Carlisle, Kewdale

Orrong Road is a major arterial road servicing the metropolitan area of Perth, Western Australia as well as the south-eastern continuation of the Graham Farmer Freeway. It is a dual carriageway for its entire length, with multiple sets of traffic lights.

In addition to servicing the southeastern suburbs of Perth, the road provides a vital connection from the Perth CBD to Perth Airport, the Kewdale Freight Terminal and the Darling Scarp. It is designated H27 (Rivervale–Wattle Grove Link) in Main Roads' internal designation along with Welshpool Road East west of Tonkin Highway.

== Route description ==
The entire length of Orrong Road is a four lane dual-carriageway, similar to other major roads in the area such as Albany Highway, Welshpool Road and Abernethy Road. Unlike those roads however, the carriageways of Orrong Road are separated by a wide tree-lined central median, giving the road more of a boulevard appearance.

The western terminus of Orrong Road is located just to the southeast of the parclo interchange between Graham Farmer Freeway and Great Eastern Highway where the road transitions from a freeway to an at-grade dual carriageway. The road continues in a south-easterly direction forming the boundary between the Town of Victoria Park's Lathlain and the City of Belmont's Rivervale. The first traffic light intersection is encountered at Francisco Street. At Roberts Road the southern suburb boundary changes to Carlisle, with the northern suburb swapping to Kewdale just south of the signalised intersection with Archer Street (at the Sydenham Street cul-de-sac).

The next signalised intersection, with Wright Street, connects Orrong Road to Belmont Forum. The final set of lights prior to Leach Highway is found at the intersection with Oats Street. At Briggs Street the southern suburb boundary changes to the City of Canning's Welshpool with the road now marking the northern limit of the Welshpool industrial area

The road then intersects with Leach Highway at a diamond interchange with Leach Highway free-flowing over Orrong Road, after which the northern side also transitions from a residential to an industrial area. The next signalised intersection with Division and Bell Street sees the road fully enter Welshpool. Two more sets of lights are encountered at Pilbara Street and Kewdale Road. After Kewdale Road the road curves to the east and runs parallel with Welshpool Road 300–400 metres (980–1,310 ft) to the south. The two roads eventually connect to each other via a signalised intersection with McDowell Street as a proxy for Welshpool Road.

Orrong Road's eastern terminus is at the diamond interchange with Roe Highway. As with Leach Highway, Roe Highway is also free-flowing over Orrong Road, which continues as Welshpool Road East from this point.

== History ==
Orrong Road was gazetted in 1937 from sections of roads at the time that were originally known as Hawkstone Street, Prospect Road, Burswood Avenue and Wickalls Avenue. The road was named after Orrong Road in Melbourne, itself an important road in Melbourne's inner south eastern suburbs.

Since gazetting Orrong Road has undergone major changes. Originally a two lane road with additional lanes at traffic signals, it was widened significantly in the 1980s and early 1990s in preparation for the construction of Graham Farmer Freeway. This required the demolition of several properties. At this time, trees were planted in the median. In 1997 the intersection with Great Eastern Highway was converted to an interchange in preparation for the connection to Graham Farmer Freeway. In 2002, before Roe Highway's extension, Orrong Road terminated at McDowell Street in the form of a T-junction, where vehicles could then travel south to Welshpool Road. Orrong Road was extended to meet Roe Highway in the form of a diamond interchange when Roe Highway was extended beyond Welshpool Road in 2003 and now continues as Welshpool Road East. In 2007 the Leach Highway intersection was converted to an interchange.

== Future ==
In 2011 a study was announced by the then Transport Minister, Troy Buswell, to look into building an Airport expressway. This would involve upgrading Orrong Road, along with Leach Highway from Orrong Road to the Airport, to a 100km/h freeway. This seems to have been dropped at the time, in favour of the Airport Line.

In late May 2019 a new planning study was announced by Mainroads WA. The concept planned for Orrong Road to be substantially upgraded in the future to a four lane expressway, running in a trench structure along the current median from Graham Farmer Freeway to President Street, before rising onto a viaduct over Leach Highway and Division and Bell Streets. Service roads along each side would provide access to properties on Orrong Road. Overall support for the concept is high, with 87 percent of respondents supporting the concept in community consultation. The Town of Victoria Park, (which includes part of the Orrong Road Road reserve north of Wright Street, and all of it from Wright Street to Kew Street) has given support for the concept, noting the high level of community support. However they have noted some opposition to the removal of the existing trees in the median.

== Junctions ==
LGA	Location	km	mi	Destinations	Notes
Victoria Park–Belmont boundary	Burswood–Lathlain–Rivervale tripoint	0	0.0	Great Eastern Highway (National Highway 94 / National Route 1) – Midland, Fremantle, Perth Airport	Northern terminus of Orrong Road starts just south of the interchange; Modified diamond interchange: additional northwest bound looped entrance ramp. Orrong Road continues as Graham Farmer Freeway northbound.
Victoria Park–Belmont boundary	Lathlain–Rivervale boundary	0.6	0.37	Francisco Street northeast – Belmont; Francisco Place southwest	Traffic light intersection
Victoria Park–Belmont boundary	Lathlain–Rivervale–Carlisle tripoint	1.2	0.75	Roberts Road – Victoria Park	
Victoria Park–Belmont boundary	Rivervale–Carlisle boundary	1.5	0.93	Alexander Road	
Victoria Park–Belmont boundary	Rivervale–Carlisle boundary	1.7	1.1	Archer Street – Victoria Park	Traffic light intersection
Victoria Park–Belmont boundary	Carlisle–Kewdale boundary	2.1	1.3	Wright Street northeast – Cloverdale; Galaxy Way southwest	Traffic light intersection with full movements between Orrong Road and Wright Street only. Galaxy Way unsignalised, northbound left in only
Victoria Park–Belmont boundary	Carlisle–Kewdale boundary	2.7	1.7	Oats Street – East Victoria Park, Bentley, Cloverdale	Traffic light intersection
Victoria Park–Belmont–Canning tripoint	Carlisle–Kewdale–Welshpool tripoint	3.2	2.0	Briggs Street	
Belmont–Canning boundary	Kewdale–Welshpool boundary	3.8	2.4	Leach Highway (State Route 7) – Fremantle, Wilson, Perth Airport	Diamond interchange (Leach Highway free flowing)
Belmont–Canning boundary	Kewdale–Welshpool boundary	4.1	2.5	Bell Street northeast Division Street southwest	Traffic light intersection
Canning	Welshpool	4.7	2.9	Pilbara Street	Traffic light intersection
Canning	Welshpool	5.1	3.2	Kewdale Road – Kewdale, Perth Airport	Traffic light intersection
Canning	Welshpool	6.1	3.8	Kurnall Road	
Canning	Welshpool	7	4.3	McDowell Street – East Victoria Park, Beckenham	Traffic light intersection, main connection to Welshpool Road.
Canning	Welshpool–East Cannington boundary	7.7	4.8	Felspar Street – East Victoria Park, East Cannington, Beckenham	
Canning	Welshpool–East Cannington boundary	8.1	5.0	Roe Highway (State Route 3) – Perth, Rockingham, Midland	Southern terminus of Orrong Road, continues as Welshpool Road East southeast bound; Diamond interchange (Roe Highway free-flowing).
1.000 mi = 1.609 km; 1.000 km = 0.621 mi: Incomplete access
