= East Cannington, Western Australia =

East Cannington Perth, Western Australia
- Coordinates: 32.008°S 115.958°E
- Population: 6,512 (SAL 2021)
- Established: 1959
- Postcode(s): 6107
- Area: 2.9 km^{2} (1.1 sq mi)
- Location: 11 km (7 mi) from Perth
- LGA(s): City of Canning
- State electorate(s): Cannington
- Federal division(s): Swan
Suburbs around East Cannington:
Queens Park	Welshpool	Wattle Grove
Cannington	East Cannington	Kenwick
Cannington	Beckenham	Beckenham

East Cannington is a southeastern suburb of Perth, Western Australia. Its local government area is the City of Canning.

== History ==
East Cannington, previously part of Queens Park Road Board District and once incorporating present day Beckenham, was largely a semi-rural area, with only the area near the railway used for housing. In 1959, the suburb was gazetted as a postal district. Many farms and horse agistment properties once populated East Cannington until developers realised its potential in the 1990s and thus almost all available land has now given way to suburban housing.

In Fred Carden's book Along the Canning East Cannington had a few notable industries, including a jam factory near the site of the old Cannington Train Station and a garment manufacturer in Lacey Street.

Evidence of the early retail trade can still be gleaned from the weatherboard shops now making up the East Cannington General Store opposite the old Cannington Railway Station site.

== Geography ==
East Cannington is bounded by the Armadale railway line to the southwest, Thomas and Gibbs Streets to the northwest, Welshpool Road to the north and Lacey Street to the southeast. It is at the eastern fringe of urban settlement in the City of Canning, with only semi-rural parts of Kenwick and Wattle Grove between the suburb and the Lesmurdie section of the Darling Scarp.

== Facilities ==
East Cannington is a residential suburb, with a small neighbourhood shopping centre in Gerard Street (now closed and houses are being built where it was) and relying on the nearby Westfield Carousel shopping centre in Cannington boundary for other commercial services. The suburb contains a primary school (Gibbs Street), and Saint Francis Catholic Primary School in Renou Street. Sevenoaks Senior College is nearby. The eastern end of the Welshpool industrial area borders the suburb to the north. A large park along the Welshpool Road border includes a nature reserve of indigenous species and a scout hall. A few other small parks throughout the suburb provide recreational facilities.

== Transport ==
East Cannington is served by the Cannington train station at its western corner, linking the area to the Perth central business district. The suburb is also served by buses from Cannington, including a circular route. All services are operated by the Public Transport Authority.

=== Bus ===
- 224 Westfield Carousel to Westfield Carousel – Clockwise Circular Route, serves Renou Street, Gibbs Street and Elizabeth Street
- 225 Westfield Carousel to Westfield Carousel – Anti-Clockwise Circular Route, serves Renou Street, Elizabeth Street and Gibbs Street
- 229 Westfield Carousel to Maddington Central – serves Renou Street
- 280 Westfield Carousel to High Wycombe Station – serves Renou Street, Lacey Street, Elizabeth Street, Station Street, Welshpool Road and Orrong Road
- 282 and 283 Oats Street Station to Kalamunda Bus Station – serve Orrong Road

=== Rail ===
- Armadale line
- Thornlie-Cockburn line
  - Services at Cannington Station
