= Lesmurdie Senior High School =

Location
- 21 Reid Road, Lesmurdie, Perth, Western Australia; Australia; 32°00′45″S 116°03′04″E

Information
- Type: Public co-educational high day school
- Motto: Thriving in a nurturing environment.
- Founded: 1981; 45 years ago
- Educational authority: WA Department of Education
- Principal: Kerry Chipchase
- Years: 7–12
- Colours: Teal, black, and white
- Website: lesmurdie.wa.edu.au

Lesmurdie Senior High School is a public co-educational high school in the Perth suburb of Lesmurdie, Western Australia.

== History ==
The school was established in 1981 and caters for students from Year 7 to Year 12.

Enrolments at the school have been relatively stable over the last five years with 869 students in 2007, 930 in 2008, 887 in 2009, 833 in 2010 and 866 in 2011. There are currently 1068 students as of 2020.

== Catchment area ==
Lesmurdie's catchment area has been specified by the WA Department of Education to include the suburbs of Lesmurdie, Walliston, Carmel, Pickering Brook, Wattle Grove and Bickley. Lesmurdie's feeder primary schools are Falls Road, Lesmurdie, Pickering Brook, Walliston and Wattle Grove. Some students from Falls Road and Walliston catchment are able to attend Kelmscott Senior High School and some students from the Wattle Grove catchment can attend Darling Range Sports College.

Its neighbour high schools are Kalamunda Senior High School to the north, Thornlie Senior High School to the south-west and Darling Range Sports College to the west.

== See also ==
- List of schools in the Perth metropolitan area
