= Queens Park, Western Australia =

Queens Park
- Suburb
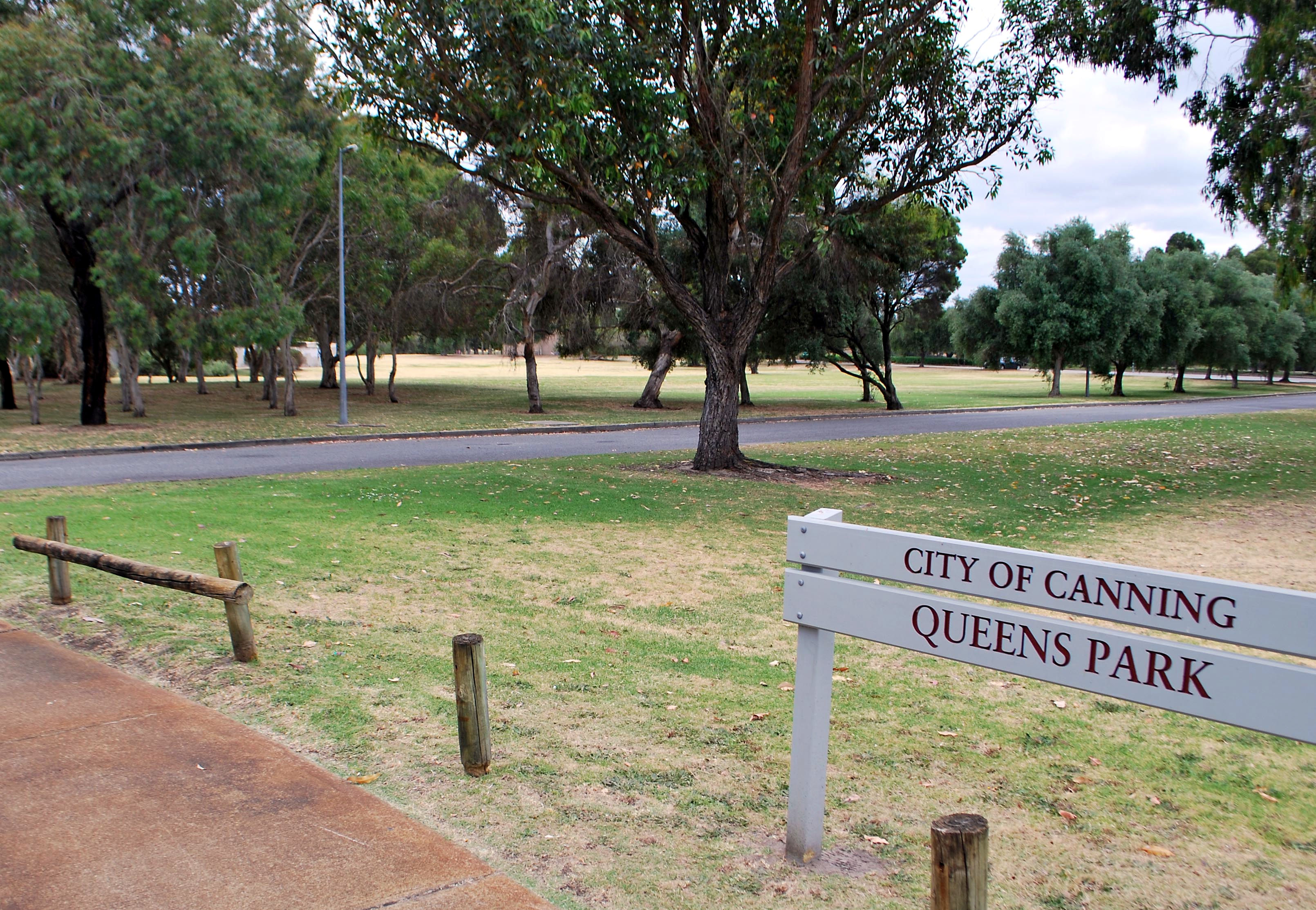
- Queens Park, City of Canning.
- Interactive map of Queens Park
- Coordinates: 32.004°S 115.942°E
- Country: Australia
- State: Western Australia
- City: Perth
- LGA: City of Canning
- Location: 11 km (6.8 mi) from the Perth CBD

Government
  - State electorate: Cannington
  - Federal division: Swan

Population
  - Total: 7,268 (SAL 2021)
- Postcode: 6107
Suburbs around Queens Park
Welshpool	Welshpool	Welshpool
Bentley	Queens Park	East Cannington
Cannington	Cannington	East Cannington

Queens Park is a suburb of Perth, Western Australia, located within the City of Canning. Its postcode is 6107.

There are 6,853 persons living in Queens Park. The top five ancestries represented in the suburb were English, Chinese, Australian, Indian, Nepali and Filipino. The majority of persons living in Queens Park were between the ages of 18 and 49 (school leavers, university students, young workforce and parents and home builders).

== Pre colonial history ==
Queens Park, prior to colonial interactions, was originally cared for by the Whadjuk Noongar people, the traditional owners for the areas along the Canning River. Prior to the colonial settlement of the area, the Canning River and its associated wetlands provided an important source of food and shelter to the Beeliar and Beeloo Noongar people. The Beeloo considered north of the Canning River to the hills as part of their ground while the Beeliar mainly traversed the southern section of the river to the sea. At the time of colonial settlement, Midgegooroo and Munday were leaders of these people. The Cannington-Wilson area was called "Beeloo" for many years by local residents.

== Post-colonial history ==
The suburb derives its name from the former Queens Park Road Board that was incorporated into the Canning and Belmont Road Boards.

Queens Park was originally known as Woodlupine. The name change was brought about following a murder in 1911. Local residents and authorities feared the incident could jeopardise the development of the area. It was agreed that the name would be changed to Queens Park to honour Queen Alexandra, wife of King Edward VII.

=== Sister Kate's children's home ===
The largest single land-holder in Queens Park was Sister Kate's children's home, which was founded by Katherine Mary Clutterbuck in 1934 and expanded in 1936. At the time, A. O. Neville, the government Chief Protector of Aborigines was the architect of an official scheme that oversaw the care, custody and education of Aboriginal and half-caste children under 16 years in the state. The scheme's purpose was to integrate young and part-Aboriginal children into white society by separating them from their families. These children later became known as the Stolen Generations.

=== Whadjuk Noongar heritage sites ===
- DAA have site 3633 located on Sevenoaks Street in Queens Park.

=== Colonial heritage ===
- The Chapel of the Guardian Angel
- Sister Kate's Children's Home
- St Josephs Roman Catholic School & Convent
- St Norbert College & St Joseph's Priory
- Cannington Fire Station
- Coronation Hotel

== Modern developments ==
Queens Park now incorporates the former suburb of Maniana, once of State Housing development post-WW2, which is being pulled down and redeveloped into "Quatro"..

New developments such as "Skytown" have seen property prices boom as developers buy old houses for unit development, especially around the older parts of Queens Park on Welshpool Road.

Queens Park is now the centre of another major re-development, with plans announced in 2020 to build a State Football Centre in Queens Park.

== Transport ==
Queens Park is home to Queens Park railway station. It is located around 11 kilometres (7 mi) from Perth CBD and serves the Armadale and Thornlie–Cockburn lines. The station is due to be rebuilt in 2023 as part of Metronet. The station is served by 1 bus route, the 201 to Cannington railway station from Curtin University.

=== Bus ===
- 36 Cannington Station to Airport Central Station – serves Wharf Street and Welshpool Road
- 51 Cannington Station to Perth Busport – serves Wharf Street and Welshpool Road
- 202 Westfield Carousel to Westfield Carousel – Clockwise Circular Route, serves Renou Street, Wharf Street, Whitlock Road, Reginald Street and Gibbs Street
- 203 Westfield Carousel to Westfield Carousel – Anti-Clockwise Circular Route, serves Gibbs Street, Reginald Street, Whitlock Road, Wharf Street and Renou Street
- 282 and 283 Elizabeth Quay Bus Station to Kalamunda Bus Station – serve Welshpool Road

=== Rail ===
- Armadale/Thornlie–Cockburn lines
  - Queens Park railway station

== Environment ==
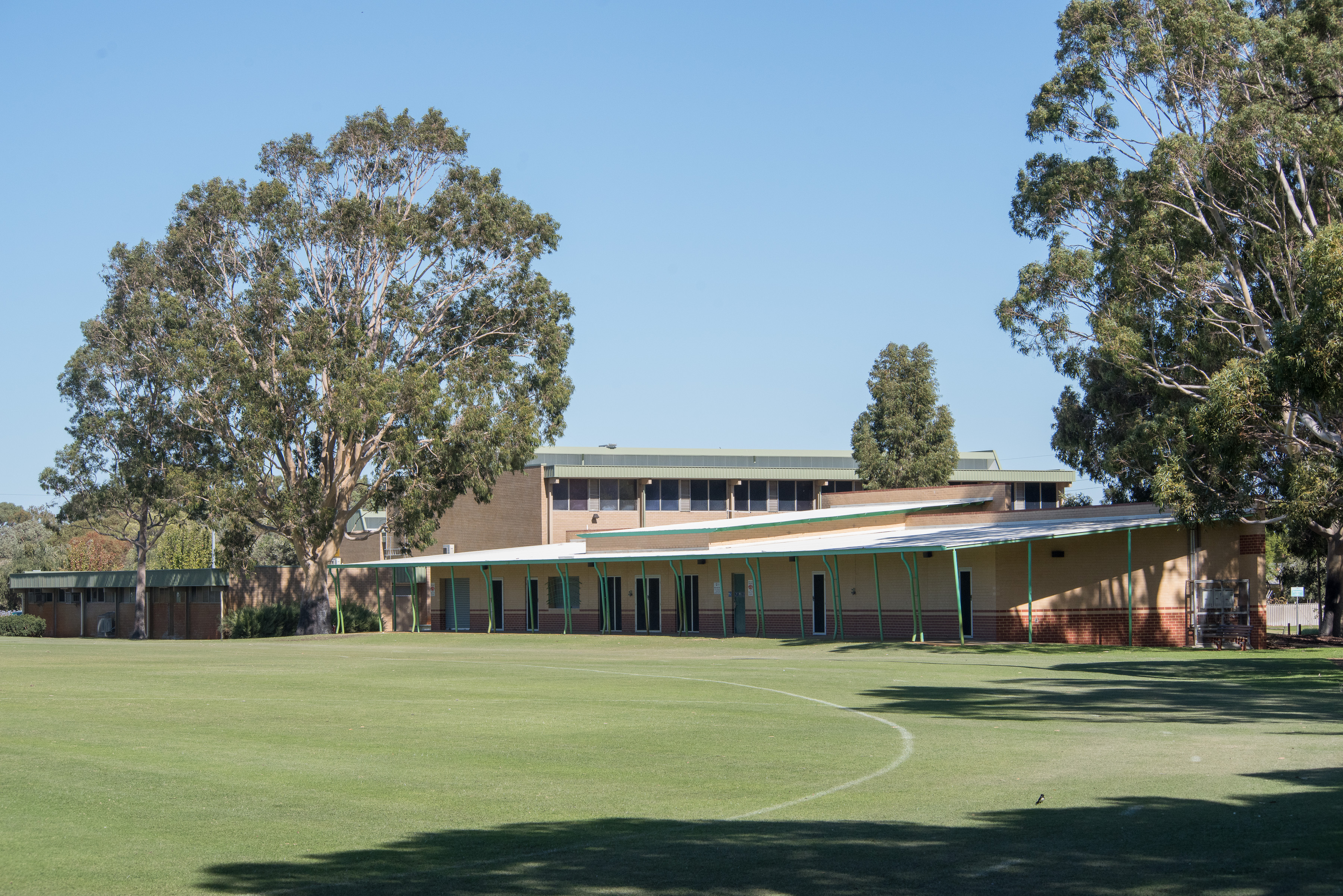
Harry Turner Pavilion, Queens Park Reserve

Queens Park has several open spaces and reserves, including an oval and eleven parks, and one regional park.

Flora includes:

- Flooded gum
- Grass tree
- Bulrushes
- Swamp paperbark

== Community groups ==
The Friends of Queens Park Bushland is a community group of volunteers whose aim is to help the community connect with nature through protecting, regenerating and revegetating the bushland in Queens Park, East Cannington and Welshpool.

The Lions Club has a branch in Queens Park.

== Sports clubs ==
The Queens Park Football Club was established in the early 1960s. Currently it has Auskick teams.

The Queens Park Soccer Club was founded in 1931. Queens Park is home to several men's, women's and junior teams.

== Wildlife ==
There are 759 wildlife species currently identified. Easily identified and frequently spotted species are:

Birds

- Cormorant
- Australian pelican
- Little egret
- Australian white ibis

Mammals

- Lesser long-eared bat
- Fox
- House mouse

Reptiles

- Southwestern snake-necked turtle
- Southern blind snake
- Dugite

Amphibians

- Limnodynastes dorsalis
- Moaning frog
- Motorbike frog

== Schools ==
- Queens Park Primary School
- St Norbert College
- St. Josephs School
- Cannington Community College

== See also ==
- Queens Park railway station, Perth
