= Cannington, Western Australia =

Cannington
- Suburb
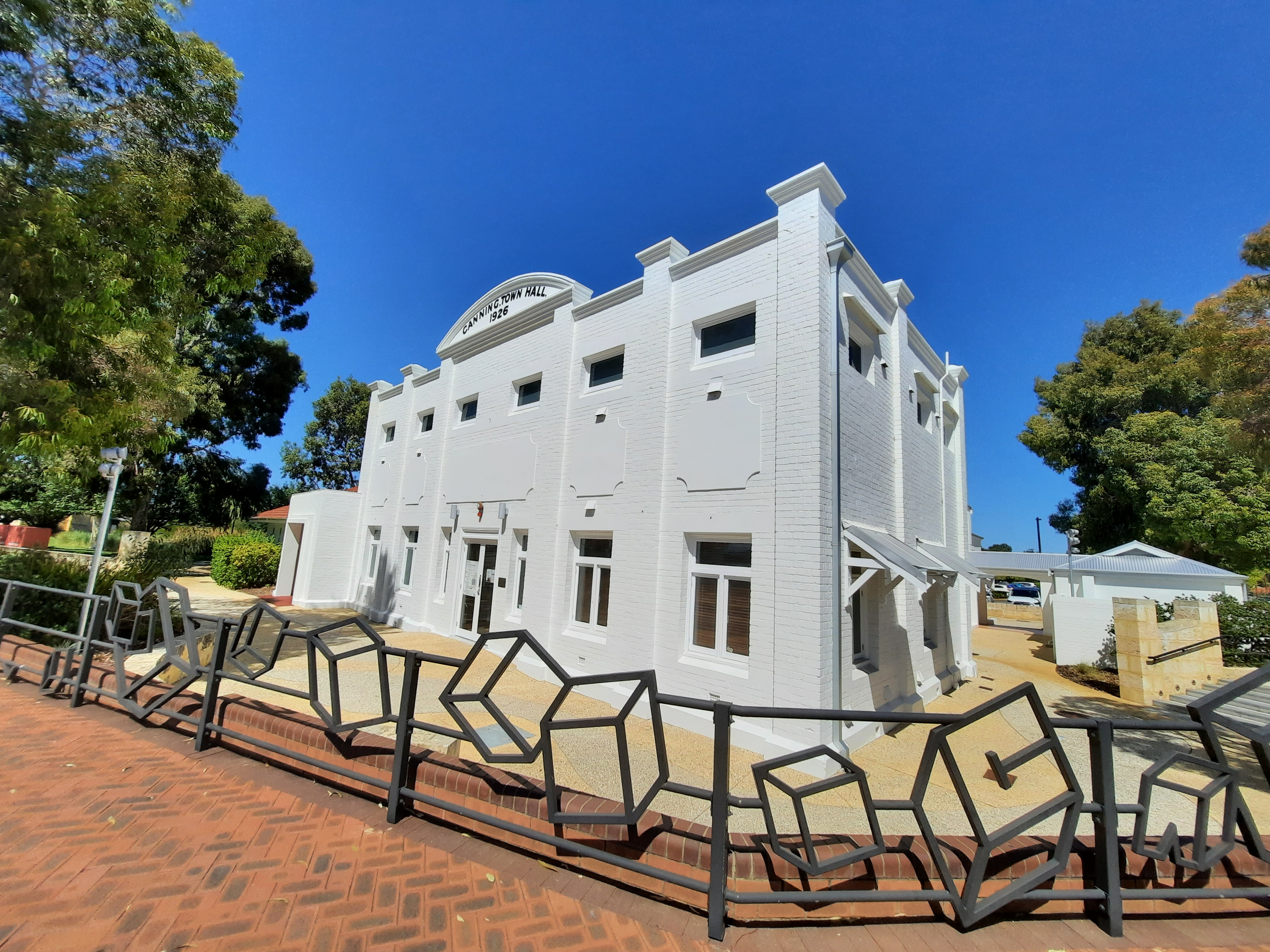
- Canning Town Hall
- Interactive map of Cannington
- Coordinates: 32.017°S 115.934°E
- Country: Australia
- State: Western Australia
- City: Perth
- LGA: City of Canning
- Location: 13 km (8.1 mi) from Perth, Western Australia
- Established: 1882

Government
  - State electorate: Cannington
  - Federal division: Swan

Area
  - Total: 4.0 km^{2} (1.5 sq mi)

Population
  - Total: 6,875 (SAL 2021)
- Postcode: 6107
Suburbs around Cannington
Wilson	Bentley	Queens Park; East Cannington
Lynwood	Cannington	Welshpool; East Cannington
Langford	Kenwick	Beckenham

Cannington is a southern suburb of Perth, Western Australia, in the local government area of the City of Canning.

== History ==
Cannington's name derives from the Canning River, which forms part of the southwestern boundary of the suburb. It was first subdivided in 1882, and a railway station was constructed in the 1890s opposite Station Street in what is now East Cannington.

=== Waverley ===
For many years the areas of Cannington, East Cannington and Beckenham were known locally as "Waverley" and many buildings and businesses used the name Waverley to designate their locality, such as the Waverley Hotel and the Waverley Drive In Cinema. The origin of the alternative use of Waverley is designated to the Cecil Gibbs who first used it in naming the Waverley Hotel that was a distinctive landmark over many generations. Between 1860 and 1883, William Lacey Gibbs, gradually accumulated most of what is Cannington. His slaughter yards were located near the present-day Myer Department Store, Westfield. His brother built the 'Cecil/Waverley' Hotel on the corner of Cecil Road and Albany Highway. The hotel was altered many times over the years and was demolished in the 1990s for widening of the Albany Highway.

== Geography ==
Cannington is bounded by Nicholson Road to the southeast, the Armadale railway line to the northeast, Mills and Burton Streets to the northwest, and Fleming Avenue and the Canning River to the southwest. Albany Highway runs through the western part of the suburb.

== Facilities ==
Cannington contains one of the Perth metropolitan area's largest shopping complexes, Westfield Carousel, first built in 1972 and extensively refurbished and expanded in the 1990s and then mid-2010s, which includes a Hoyts cinema complex. Albany Highway contains a range of shops and small warehouses, as well as the City of Canning council offices. Bentley Hospital is just beyond the northwestern boundary on Mills Street.

Along the Canning River is the Canning River Regional Park, which contains walking tracks and picnic facilities as well as the Woodloes Museum, a restored 1874 house built by architect and pioneer Francis Bird. Various sports and leisure facilities, including soccer fields, ten-pin bowling and an indoor athletics centre. The Canning showgrounds includes the Cannington Exhibition Centre and was home to the Cannington Raceway owned by the Western Australian Greyhound Racing Association from 1974 to 2015. The greyhound racing now takes place across the road on the north side on a new track which opened on 23 March 2016.

Cannington Community College, a public primary and junior high school (K-10), and Sevenoaks Senior College, a senior secondary college (Years 11 and 12) are located in Cannington.

== Transport ==
Cannington is on Albany Highway, a primary route into the Perth central business district, and lies to the southeast of Leach Highway and to the northwest of Roe Highway. Manning Road (State Route 26) provides access to Curtin University of Technology and Kwinana Freeway.

Cannington is home to Cannington railway station which serves the Armadale and Thornlie–Cockburn lines. The station was upgraded in 2025 as part of Metronet. Cannington station has been elevated and modernised as well as other stations on the Armadale Line. Cannington also has a bus interchange with 16 stands. The station has many bus routes like the 280 which operates to High Wycombe railway station and connects the Armadale and Thornlie–Cockburn lines to the Airport line. Also there are routes like the 200 and 925 which connects Cannington to the Mandurah line. These bus routes are operated by Swan Transit and Keolis WA.

=== Bus ===
- 36 Cannington Station to Airport Central Station – serves Cecil Avenue
- 51 Cannington Station to Perth Busport – serves Cecil Avenue
- 202 Cannington Station to Bull Creek Station – serves Cecil Avenue, Albany Highway, Grose Avenue and Carousel Road
- 222 Cannington Station to Curtin University Bus Station – serves Sevenoaks Street, Queens Park Station, Mills Street, Doust Street and Albany Highway
- 907 Perth Busport to Byford Station (Armadale Line train replacement)
- 908 Perth Busport to Cockburn Central Station (Thornlie-Cockburn Line train replacement)

Bus routes serving Albany Highway:

- 220 Perth Busport to Armadale Station
- 930 Elizabeth Quay Bus Station to Thornlie Station (high frequency)

Bus routes serving Cecil Avenue, Albany Highway and Manning Road:

- 72 and 177 Cannington Station to Elizabeth Quay Bus Station
- 200 Cannington Station to Bull Creek Station
- 920 Cannington Station to Canning Bridge Station (high frequency)

Bus routes serving Cecil Avenue and Albany Highway:

- 34 Cannington Station to Perth Busport
- 203 Cannington Station to Bull Creek Station
- 207 Cannington Station to Murdoch University
- 208 Cannington Station to Murdoch University
- 925 Cannington Station to Bull Creek Station (high frequency)

Bus routes serving Grose Avenue, Carousel Road, Cecil Avenue and Cannington Station:

- 224 Westfield Carousel to Westfield Carousel – Clockwise Circular Route
- 225 Westfield Carousel to Westfield Carousel – Anti-Clockwise Circular Route
- 229 Westfield Carousel to Maddington Central
- 280 Westfield Carousel to High Wycombe Station

=== Rail ===
- Armadale line
- Thornlie-Cockburn line
  - Queens Park railway station
  - Cannington railway station

== Politics ==
Cannington has a broadly young, middle-class, mixed-ethnic population and supports the Australian Labor Party at both Federal and state elections.

== See also ==
- City of Canning
- Westfield Carousel
