= Woodloes Homestead =

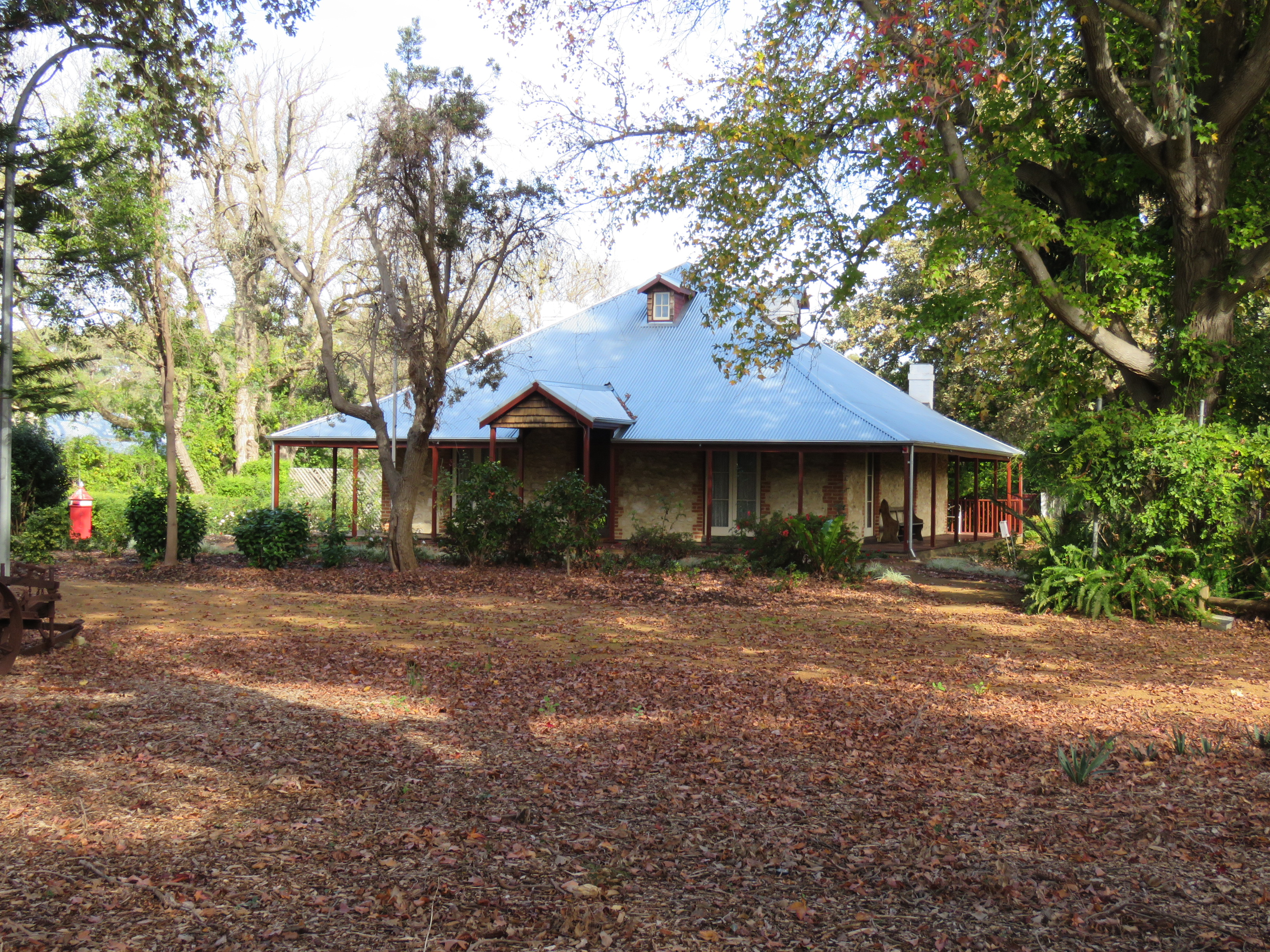
- The Woodloes Homestead in 2021

- Location within Perth

General information
- Type: Homestead
- Location: Cannington, Western Australia
- Coordinates: 32°01′38″S 115°56′31″E

Western Australia Heritage Register
- Designated: 21 January 1997
- Reference no.: 433

Woodloes Homestead was built in 1871 by architect Francis Bird. The homestead is situated on the banks of the Canning River in Cannington. Bird was partner in the Mason-Bird Timber Company, cut timber in the Darling Range and transported it via a horse-drawn railway to Mason's Landing, near Woodloes Homestead. Woodloes Homestead was classified by the National Trust in 1988, nominated to the Register of The National Estate in 1991 and permanently added to Western Australian State Heritage register on 21 January 1997.

== Design ==
Woodloes Homestead is a square planned Victorian Georgian home with verandahs on all four sides. Originally it had a timber shingled roof that has since been replaced by corrugated iron before being returned to being timber shingled. The walls are made of limestone rubble with brick quoining at the entrance ways. The floors are made of timber and the building includes an attic and cellar with central hallway and rear kitchen.

== Owners ==
The homestead was originally built by Bird for himself in 1871. In 1882 Bird sold Woodloes to Joseph Shaw. The property was subsequently sold another 10 times some of whom subdivided off parcels of the land. The City of Canning brought the property in 1974 to preserve it, provide a venue for the Canning Historical society and create a museum. In 1990 due to the widening of nearby Albany Highway the Church with the Chimney was shifted to the site.
