= Lesmurdie, Western Australia =

Lesmurdie
- Suburb
- Interactive map of Lesmurdie
- Coordinates: 31.994°S 116.050°E
- Country: Australia
- State: Western Australia
- City: Perth
- LGA: City of Kalamunda
- Location: 21 km (13 mi) from Perth, Western Australia
- Established: 1897

Government
  - State electorate: Kalamunda
  - Federal division: Bullwinkel

Population
  - Total: 8,413 (SAL 2021)
- Postcode: 6076
Suburbs around Lesmurdie
Maida Vale	Kalamunda	Kalamunda
Forrestfield	Lesmurdie	Walliston
Wattle Grove	Wattle Grove	Bickley

Lesmurdie is a suburb of Perth, Western Australia, located within the City of Kalamunda. It was established in 1897 by Archibald Sanderson, a politician and journalist, who began buying properties in the area from the Canning Jarrah Timber Company to build up a rural retreat and fruit-growing property. He named it after Lesmurdie Cottage, a shooting box near Dufftown, Scotland that his father had rented, on a property that was named "Lesmurdie" when its owners, the Leslie and Murdoch families, intermarried. It was officially gazetted on 8 June 1959.

The main access to the suburb from the Swan Coastal Plain is via Welshpool Road East, which snakes its way up the side of the Darling Scarp from the suburb of Wattle Grove. Lesmurdie can also be accessed from Kalamunda, Walliston, Carmel and Bickley, primarily through Canning Road.

The shopping centres in the area are the Lesmurdie Village on Sanderson Road and the Lesmurdie Road Shopping Centre on the corner of Rooth Road and Lesmurdie Road.

Lesmurdie has three high schools within its boundaries, the government operated Lesmurdie Senior High School as well as the privately operated Mazenod College for boys and St Brigid's College for girls. There are two government primary schools in Lesmurdie, Lesmurdie Primary School and Falls Road Primary School as well as a privately operated primary school at St Brigid's.

== Transport ==
=== Bus ===
- 275 Walliston to High Wycombe Station – serves Canning Road
- 279 Kalamunda Bus Station to Maddington Central – serves Lesmurdie Road and Welshpool Road
- 281 Lesmurdie Senior High School to Darling Range Sports College – serves Welshpool Road
- 282 Kalamunda Bus Station to Elizabeth Quay Bus Station – serves Canning Road, Grove Road, Rooth Road, George Road, Gladys Road and Welshpool Road
- 283 Kalamunda Bus Station to Elizabeth Quay Bus Station – serves Lesmurdie Road and Welshpool Road

== See also ==
- Mundy Regional Park
