= Welshpool Road =

Road in Perth, Western Australia

Welshpool Road Welshpool Road East Western Australia
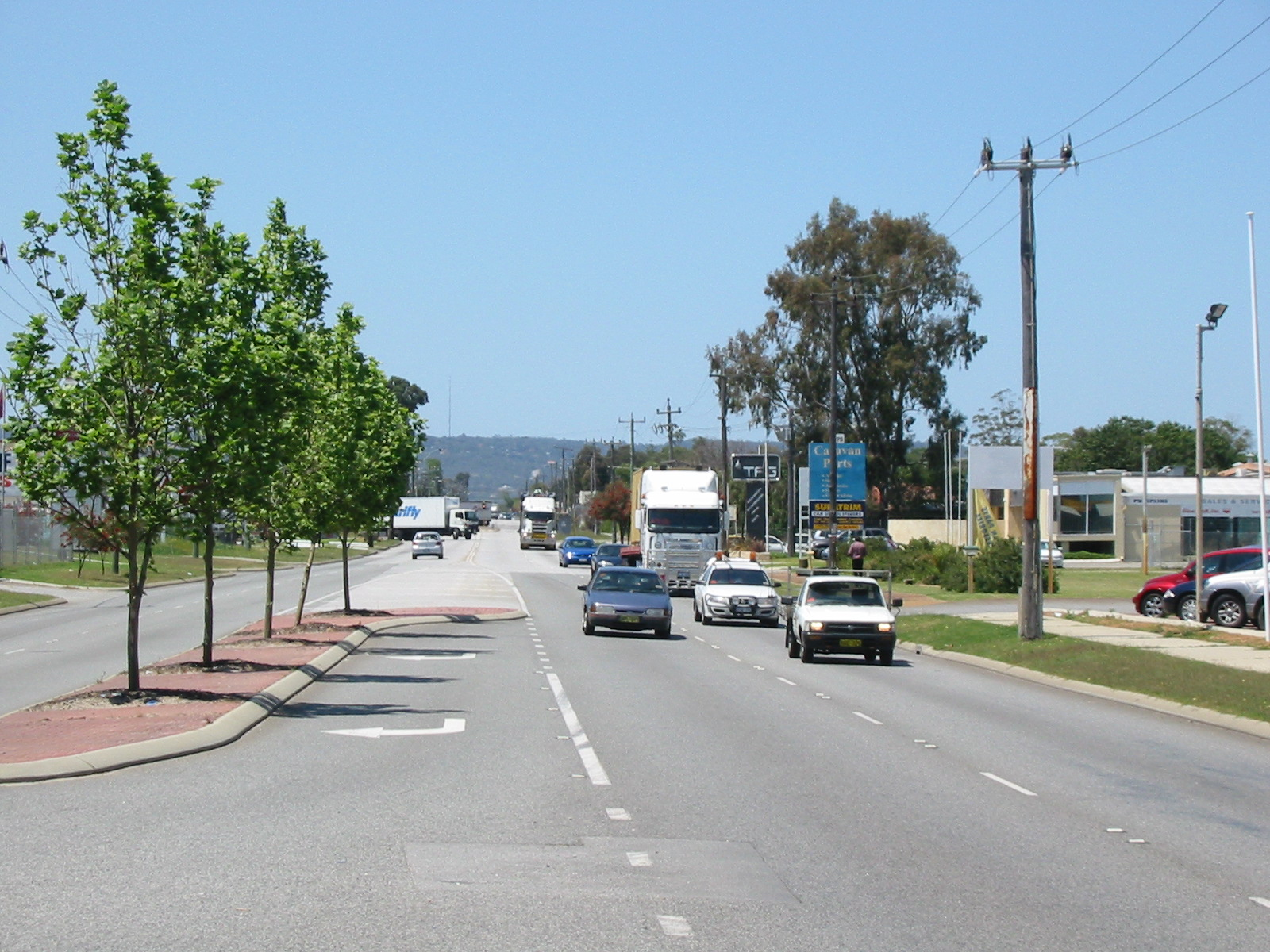
- East bound view along Welshpool Road in Welshpool

General information
- Type: Road
- Length: 15 km (9.3 mi)
- Route number(s): State Route 8 (Welshpool Road East)
- Former route number: State Route 35 (entire road)

Major junctions
Welshpool Road
- West end: Shepperton Road (State Route 30), St James
- Albany Highway (State Route 30); Leach Highway (State Route 7); Kewdale Road
- East end: William Street, Welshpool
Welshpool Road East
- West end: Roe Highway (State Route 3), Welshpool
- Tonkin Highway (State Route 4); Lesmurdie Road
- East end: Canning Road (State Route 41), Carmel

Location(s)
- Major suburbs: Queens Park, Wattle Grove, Lesmurdie

Welshpool Road is a major arterial road running through the metropolitan area of Perth, Western Australia. Although the road is now split in two, having had its western and eastern sections disconnected due to the extension of Roe Highway, it remains Welshpool's second most important road (after Orrong Road), and the highest quality access road for the Darling Scarp.

Welshpool Road East is part of State Route 8, while the entire road was previously allocated State Route 35.

== Route description ==
=== Welshpool Road ===
Welshpool Road west of Roe Highway is 5.5 km (3.4 mi) long, and unlike Welshpool Road East, did not have a West suffix added after the road's disconnection. The road is typical of those major in the Welshpool Area; although of a reasonable quality, being a 4-lane single or dual carriageway it contains only a handful of traffic lights, is choked by traffic in peak hour, has industrial business dotting the road, and has many minor roads which have no form of control, give way and stop signs excepted.

Welshpool Road begins as an extension of a west-east section of Albany Highway (Albany Highway continues to the south of the intersection). Continuing through Welshpool it meets the Leach Highway soon after. Leach Highway marks the most dangerous intersection for both Welshpool Road and Leach Highway; the intersection is also one of Perth's busiest. It then meets Kewdale Road, passing through outer Welshpool after this point. The final controlled intersection for the road is McDowell Street. McDowell Street extends north, meets Orrong Road, and then continues into neighbouring Kewdale. Although of importance for barely 300 m (980 ft), McDowell Street distributes traffic onto Orrong Road, allowing motorists to continue their journey along Welshpool Road East.

For those who continue along Welshpool Road, the road sharply turns south after 500 m (1,600 ft), and continues as William Street.

==== Junctions ====
LGA	Location	km	mi	Destinations	Notes
Victoria Park–Canning boundary	East Victoria Park–St James boundary	0	0.0	Shepperton Road/Albany Highway (State Route 30)	Traffic light intersection; Welshpool Road continues as Albany Highway west of this point
Canning	Welshpool	0.9	0.56	Sevenoaks Street	Traffic light intersection
Canning	Welshpool	0.9	0.56	Rutland Avenue & Railway Parade	Left in/left out only (no straight across or right turns)
Canning	Welshpool	1.0	0.62	Adams Drive	
Canning	Welshpool	1.1	0.68	Tomlinson Road	
Canning	Welshpool	1.4	0.87	John Street	
Canning	Welshpool	1.6	0.99	Leach Highway (State Route 7)	Traffic light intersection
Canning	Welshpool	1.8	1.1	Ewing Street	
Canning	Welshpool	1.9	1.2	Moriarty Road	
Canning	Welshpool	2.1	1.3	Radium Street North	
Canning	Welshpool	2.3	1.4	Pilbara Street	
Canning	Welshpool & Queens Park	2.6	1.6	Mills Street	
Canning	Welshpool & Queens Park	3.0	1.9	Kewdale Road/Hamilton Street	Traffic lights intersection Left turn only from Hamilton Street, no entry to Hamilton Street except for Welshpool Road westbound
Canning	Welshpool & Queens Park	3.3	2.1	Treasure Road	
Canning	Welshpool & Queens Park	3.6	2.2	George Street	
Canning	Welshpool & Queens Park	4.0	2.5	Wharf Street	
Canning	Welshpool & Queens Park	4.2	2.6	Murray Road South	
Canning	Welshpool & Queens Park	4.8	3.0	McDowell Street	Traffic light intersection
Canning	East Cannington	5.4	3.4	Station Street	Welshpool Road continues as William Street east of this point
1.000 mi = 1.609 km; 1.000 km = 0.621 mi: Incomplete access

=== Welshpool Road East ===
Welshpool Road East (9.5 km long) had an East suffix added after the road's disconnection. At a similar quality to Welshpool Road, its 4-lane section is an entire dual carriageway; it changes to a 2 to 3 lane single carriageway after climbing most of the Darling Scarp, however. With only 4 traffic lights in total (two of those at Roe Highway's diamond interchange), traffic problems are relatively minor, the only congestion being towards Roe Highway westbound.

Allocated State Route 8, Welshpool Road East starts as an extension of Orrong Road. Soon after meeting Roe Highway, it meets Hale Road. Hale Road serves as the main road for Forrestfield, eventually passing through a rural Maida Vale and climbing the Darling Scarp. Welshpool Road then passes through Wattle Grove, a mostly rural foothill suburb; however, this section is suburban. It then meets Tonkin Highway; this marks both State Route 8 and Welshpool Road's final traffic light and departure from the Swan Coastal Plain.

After this point, the scenery transitions to semi-rural; however, the quality of the road remains high. After about 2 km (1.2 mi), the road starts to climb the Darling Scarp, varying from 6- to 10-degree angle of slope. A short time after this, the median which was previously as wide as 4 lanes thins out dramatically, and becomes negligible. The road continues to climb quite steeply; similar to Great Eastern Highway the climb is constant; Kalamunda Road's climb of the escarpment is undulating. Welshpool Road East then meets Lesmurdie Road, and finally changes to a 2-lane single carriageway. After this point, westbound traffic is given two overtaking lanes that last for about 750 m (2,500 ft) each. Finishing its climb in Carmel, Welshpool Road terminates into Canning Road.

==== Junctions ====
LGA	Location	km	mi	Destinations	Notes
Canning	Welshpool & East Cannington	0	0.0	Roe Highway State Route 3	Diamond interchange for Roe Highway, Welshpool Road East continues as Orrong Road west of this point
Kalamunda	Wattle Grove	0.6	0.37	Hale Road northeast Logistics Boulevard southwest	Traffic light intersection. Traffic exiting Logistics Boulevard can only turn left onto Welshpool Road
Kalamunda	Wattle Grove	2.2	1.4	Tonkin Highway State Route 4	Traffic light intersection
Kalamunda	Wattle Grove	2.7	1.7	Crystal Brook Road	
Kalamunda	Wattle Grove	3.5	2.2	Lewis Road	
Kalamunda	Lesmurdie	6.2	3.9	Crystal Brook Road	
Kalamunda	Lesmurdie	6.7	4.2	Gladys Road	
Kalamunda	Lesmurdie	7.1	4.4	Lesmurdie Road	
Kalamunda	Lesmurdie & Carmel	8.2	5.1	Pomeroy Road	
Kalamunda	Carmel	10.2	6.3	State Route 41 Canning Road	Eastern terminus at T-junction
1.000 mi = 1.609 km; 1.000 km = 0.621 mi: Incomplete access

== History ==
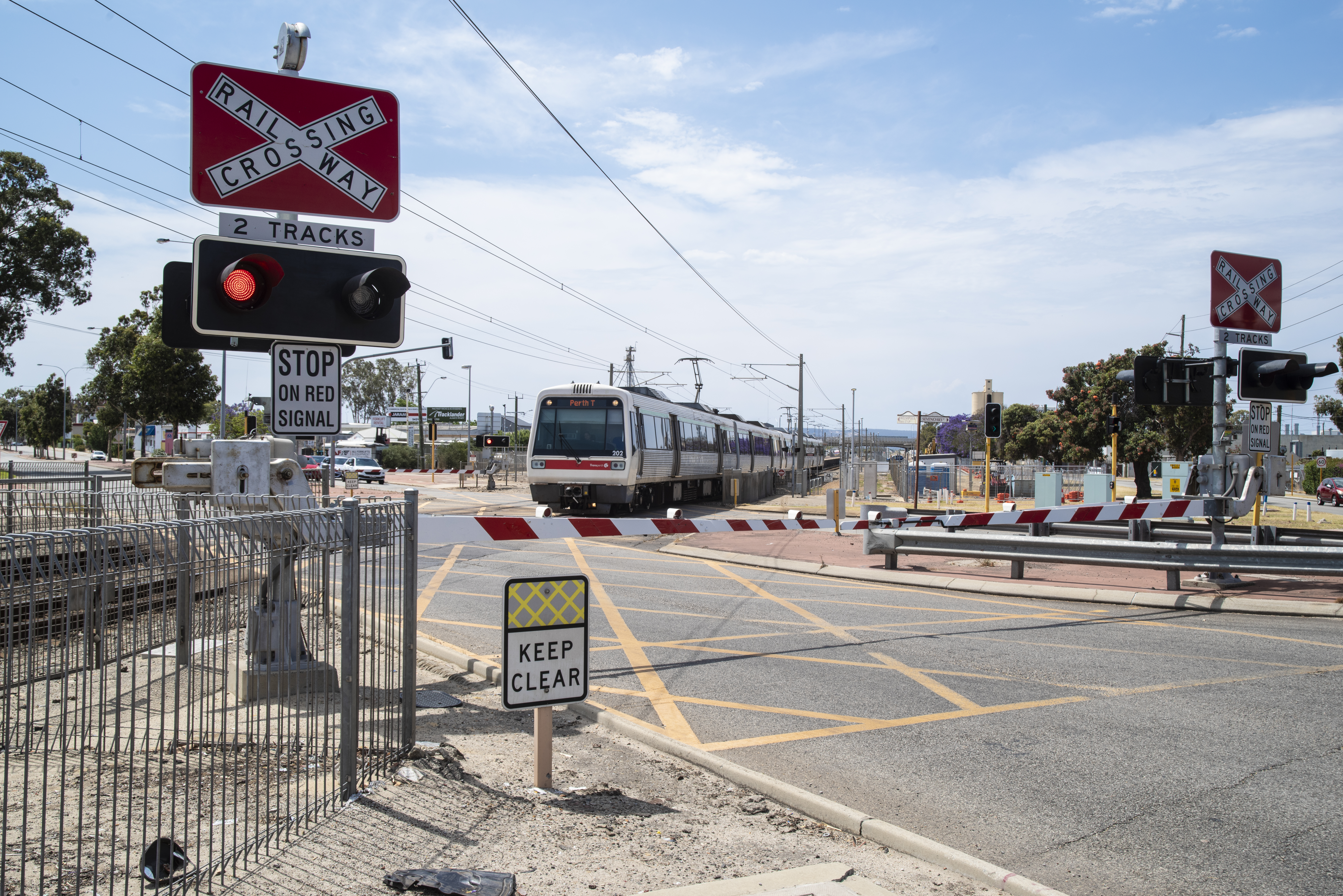
Former South Western Railway level crossing in November 2023

Roe Highway's extension beyond Welshpool Road in 2002 represented the biggest change to Perth's transport infrastructure since the Graham Farmer Freeway was opened in 2000. Welshpool Road, Orrong Road and William Street were the 3 major roads affected due to the extension.

Before Roe Highway's extension in 2002, the highway's north and southbound lanes separated, leaving a 250 m (820 ft) gap between them once they met Welshpool Road. After this, they both formed one lane and came back together, continuing as William Street. Orrong Road would terminate into Welshpool Road in the form of a T-junction.

Due to the extension of Roe Highway, major changes were made. Firstly, Welshpool Road was disconnected; William Street was disconnected from Roe Highway, and Orrong Road was extended to meet Roe Highway in the form of a diamond interchange. Orrong Road now continues as Welshpool Road East. Welshpool Road West now continues as William Street.

Until 2024, Welshpool Road crossed the South Western Railway via a level crossing. As part of the Victoria Park-Canning Level Crossing Removal Project, a bridge was built to carry the railway line over the road.
