= Beckenham, Western Australia =

Beckenham
- Suburb
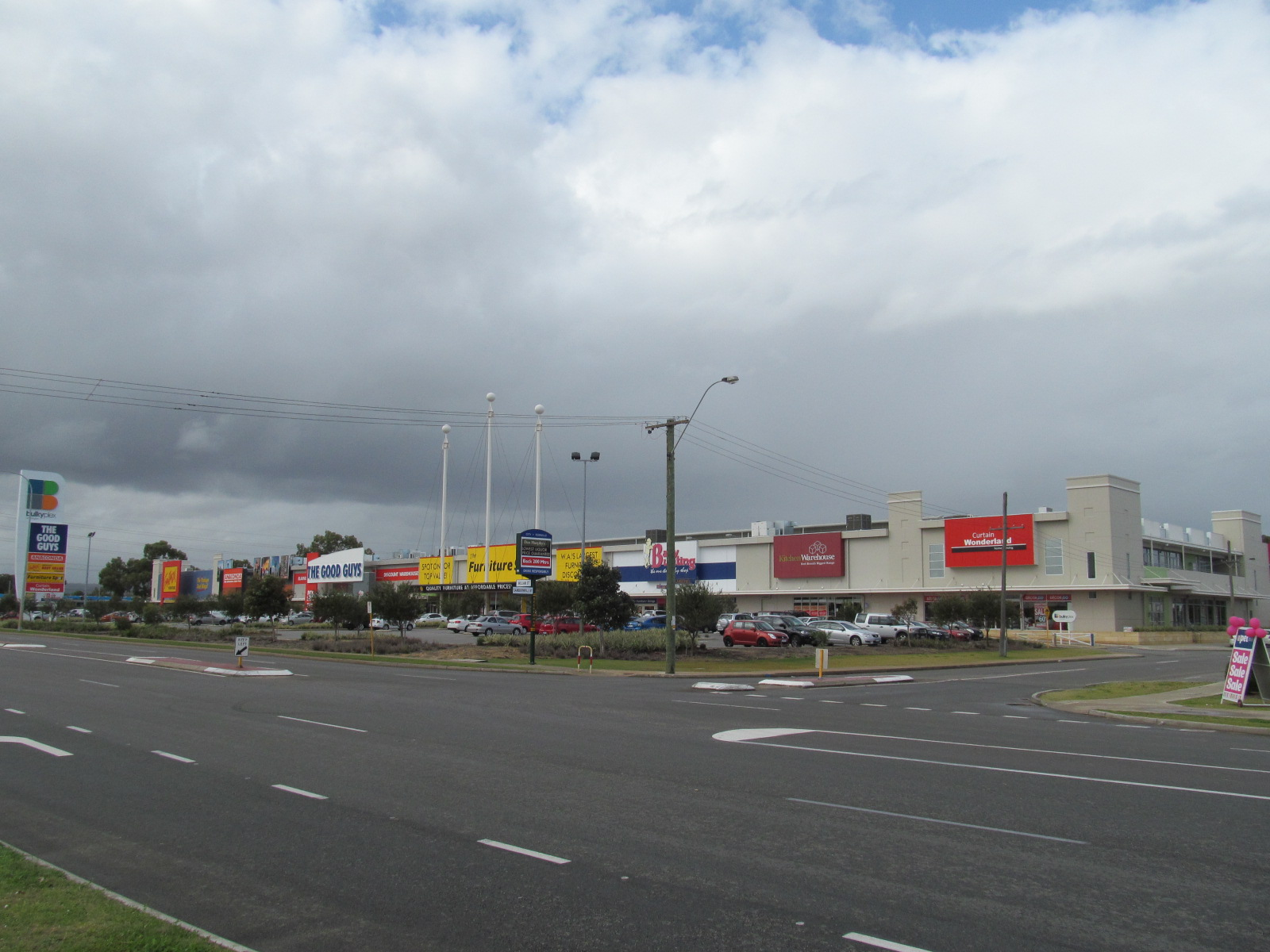
- Shops on William Street, Beckenham, near the Beckenham railway station
- Interactive map of Beckenham
- Coordinates: 32.022°S 115.954°E
- Country: Australia
- State: Western Australia
- City: Perth
- LGA: City of Gosnells
- Location: 13 km (8.1 mi) from the Perth CBD

Government
  - State electorate: Cannington
  - Federal division: Burt

Area
  - Total: 5.8 km^{2} (2.2 sq mi)

Population
  - Total: 9,092 (SAL 2021)
- Postcode: 6107
Suburbs around Beckenham
East Cannington	Welshpool	Wattle Grove
Cannington	Beckenham	Kenwick
Ferndale	Thornlie	Maddington

Beckenham is a suburb of Perth, Western Australia, located within the City of Gosnells.

== History ==
This suburb has seen many name changes. It was previously known as Buckingham, it once shared a "common usage" name of Waverley with East Cannington, and has one of the oldest and most well respected primary schools in Western Australia. The Canning River runs along the southwestern outskirts of Beckenham. In 2011 Beckenham released many new divisions of land.

== Transport ==
=== Bus ===
- 220 Perth Busport to Armadale Station – serves Albany Highway
- 224 Westfield Carousel to Westfield Carousel – Clockwise Circular Route, serves Elizabeth Street, William Street, Faversham Street, Lynstead Street and Lena Street
- 225 Westfield Carousel to Westfield Carousel – Anti-Clockwise Circular Route, serves Lena Street, Lynstead Street, Faversham Street, William Street and Elizabeth Street
- 229 Westfield Carousel to Maddington Central – serves Lena Street, Brixton Street, Sydenham Street and Ladywell Street
- 280 Westfield Carousel to High Wycombe Station – serves Lacey Street

Bus routes serving Nicholson Road:

- 202 Cannington Station to Bull Creek Station
- 203 Cannington Station to Bull Creek Station
- 207 Cannington Station to Murdoch University
- 208 Cannington Station to Murdoch University
- 925 Cannington Station to Bull Creek Station (high frequency)
- 930 Thornlie Station to Elizabeth Quay Bus Station (high frequency)
- 930X Thornlie Station to Elizabeth Quay Bus Station (high frequency/limited stops)

=== Rail ===
- Armadale Line
- Thornlie-Cockburn Line
  - Beckenham Station

== Facilities ==
The suburb currently only hosts one school being "Beckenham Primary School", a public co-ed primary school initially established in 1912.

== See also ==
- Beckenham railway station
