= Welshpool, Western Australia =

Welshpool
- Suburb
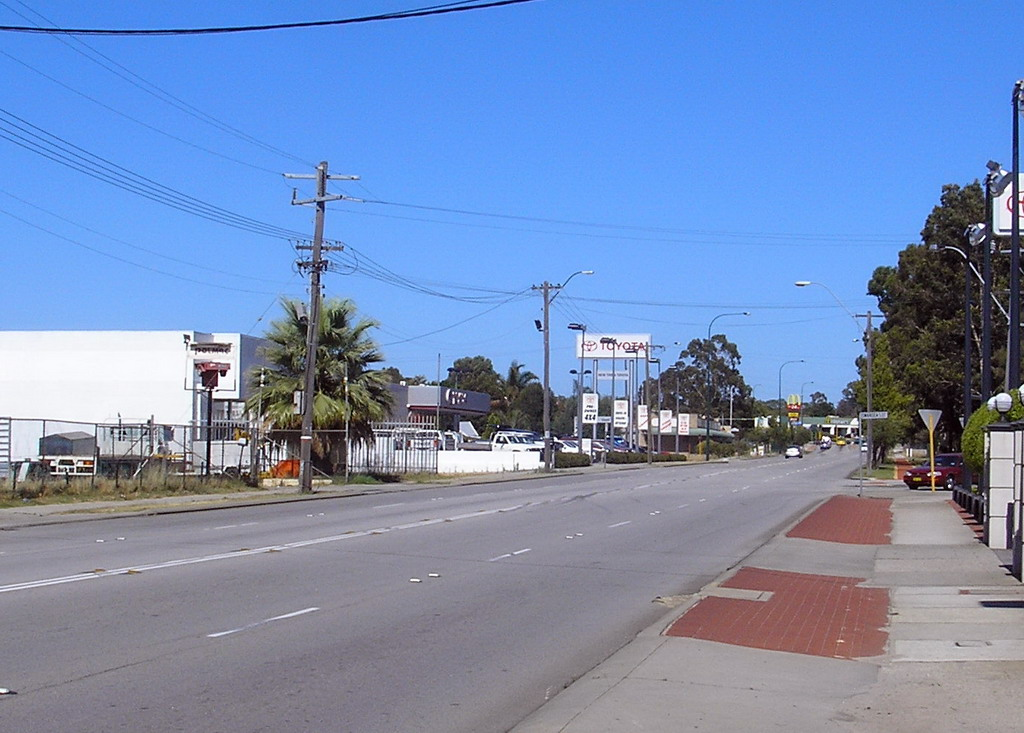
- Welshpool Road, Welshpool
- Coordinates: 31.994°S 115.956°E
- Country: Australia
- State: Western Australia
- City: Perth
- LGA(s): City of Canning; Town of Victoria Park
- Location: 11 km (6.8 mi) from the Perth CBD
- Established: 1895

Government
  - State electorate(s): Belmont, Victoria Park
  - Federal division(s): Swan

Area
  - Total: 8.3 km^{2} (3.2 sq mi)

Population
  - Total(s): 16 (SAL 2021)
- Postcode: 6106
Suburbs around Welshpool
Carlisle	Kewdale	Kewdale
East Victoria Park	Welshpool	Wattle Grove
St James; Bentley	Queens Park; East Cannington	Beckenham; Kenwick

Welshpool is an inner southeastern suburb of Perth, Western Australia, located mostly within the City of Canning and partially within the Town of Victoria Park.

The area is one of the main industrial areas of Perth, along with Kewdale, Kwinana Beach, Henderson, Malaga, O'Connor, Canning Vale and Osborne Park.

Welshpool is visually known for its three complexes of silo towers. These house storage of feed products for the poultry and agricultural industries.

Welshpool is a traditional industrial suburb partly to the fact of its proximity to Perth Airport and short distance to the Perth central business district.

Welshpool is named after the town of Welshpool in Wales.

== Transport ==
Welshpool was home to Welshpool railway station; it was located on the Armadale and Thornlie lines.

In the twentieth century the railway station yard was connected to a number of active sidings, including in the second world war to a munitions factory, however by the 2000s all sidings had been removed.

Welshpool Station was closed on 20 November 2023 and demolished due to low patronage and the modernisation of the railway line.

Welshpool Station was not connected to bus routes, though routes 282 and 283 are located close by on Welshpool Road. Both these routes run from Oats Street Station to Kalamunda bus station.

=== Bus ===
- 36 Cannington Station to Airport Central Station – serves Welshpool Road and Kewdale Road
- 51 Cannington Station to Perth Busport – serves Welshpool Road and Orrong Road
- 280 Cannington Station to High Wycombe Station – serves Welshpool Road and Orrong Road
- 282 and 283 Oats Street Station to Kalamunda Bus Station – serve Rutland Avenue, Welshpool Road, Swansea Street and Orrong Road
- 284 Curtin University Bus Station to Belmont Forum – serves Star Street and Kew Street
- 285 Oats Street Station to Kewdale – serves Orrong Road, Pilbara Street and Dowd Street
