= Darling Range Sports College =

Location
- 117 Berkshire Road; Forrestfield, Western Australia; Australia; 31°58′31″S 116°00′37″E

Information
- Former name: Forrestfield Senior High School
- Type: Independent public co-educational day school
- Opened: 1975; 51 years ago
- Educational authority: WA Department of Education
- Principal: Rob Lawson
- Years: 7–12
- Enrolment: 1,124 (2024)
- Campus type: Suburban
- Website: darlingrangesc.wa.edu.au

Darling Range Sports College is an Independent Public secondary school in Forrestfield, a suburb 14 kilometres (8.7 mi) east of Perth, Western Australia. Formerly known as Forrestfield Senior High School, the school was renamed in 2008 due to it becoming a specialist sports school.

== History ==
The school opened in 1975 as Forrestfield Senior High School.

In 2000, A$300,000, equivalent to A$534,313 in 2022, was spent on making the school's pool indoors and heated.

In 2001, Bianca Batten, a student at Forrestfield Senior High School, won the Beazley Medal for Vocational Education and Training (VET). This was the first time the Beazley Medal for VET had been awarded, having previously been awarded to just the top TEE student. The Beazley Medal is the most prestigious award offered to year 12 graduates in Western Australia.

In 2008, the school was turned into a specialist sports school. Prior to that, the school had several sports programs, but more became available in 2008. Alongside this, the school was rebranded as Darling Range Sports College, named after the nearby Darling Range.

In 2011, a A$4-million, 250-seat indoor sports stadium was opened. In late 2014, A$2.6 million worth of new buildings were completed to increase the capacity of the school for the addition of year 7 students in 2015. The upgrades included 5 new classrooms.

At the start of 2019, designs were revealed for a A$10-million upgrade. In December 2019, the upgrades commenced. The upgrades were a 2017 election commitment by the Labor Party, and include new buildings for design and technology and food technology, as well as the refurbishment of existing science laboratories. The new buildings were completed late 2020.

== Programs ==
=== Sports academy ===
Darling Range Sports College is the first specialist sports school in Western Australia. It provides school based specialist programs in athletics, Australian rules football, baseball, basketball, netball, rugby league, soccer, swimming, and triathlon. Sports facilities include a 250-seat indoor stadium and an eight-lane, 25-metre (82 ft) indoor swimming pool. Among the coaches of the specialist programs are Sandover Medallist Aaron Black and former Perth Wildcats and Cairns Taipans coach Alan Black.

=== Other ===
Non-sports programs offered by the school include the Academic Challenge and Enrichment program, music program, and Vocational Education and Training program.

== Student numbers ==
Year	Number
2016	974
2017	1,005
2018	996
2019	956
2020	1,012
2021	1,055
2022	1.049
2023	1,123
2024	1,124

== Notable alumni ==
- Jessica Anstiss – Netball player for the West Coast Fever.
- Denver Grainger-Barras – AFL footballer for the Hawthorn Football Club.

== See also ==
- List of schools in the Perth metropolitan area
