= City of Canning =

Coordinates: 32°01′01″S 115°56′02″E

- Local government area
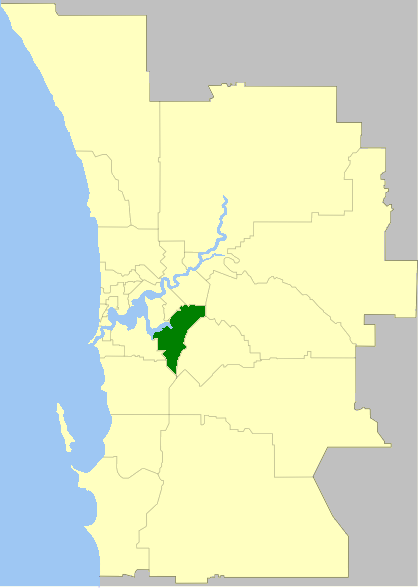
- The City of Canning within the Perth Metropolitan Area

- Interactive map of City of Canning
- Country: Australia
- State: Western Australia
- Region: South East Metropolitan Perth
- Established: 1871
- Council seat: Cannington

Government
  - Mayor: Patrick Hall
  - State electorate: Cannington, Victoria Park, Belmont, Riverton, Southern River
  - Federal division: Swan, Tangney, Canning

Area
  - Total: 64.8 km^{2} (25.0 sq mi)

Population
  - Total: 95,860 (LGA 2021)
- Website: City of Canning
LGAs around City of Canning
South Perth	Victoria Park	Belmont
Melville	City of Canning	Kalamunda
Cockburn	Gosnells	Gosnells

The City of Canning is a local government area in the southeastern suburbs of the Western Australian capital city of Perth, about 10 kilometres (6 mi) southeast of Perth's central business district. The City covers an area of 64.8 square kilometres (25.0 sq mi) and had a population of approximately 90,000 as at the 2016 Census.

== History ==
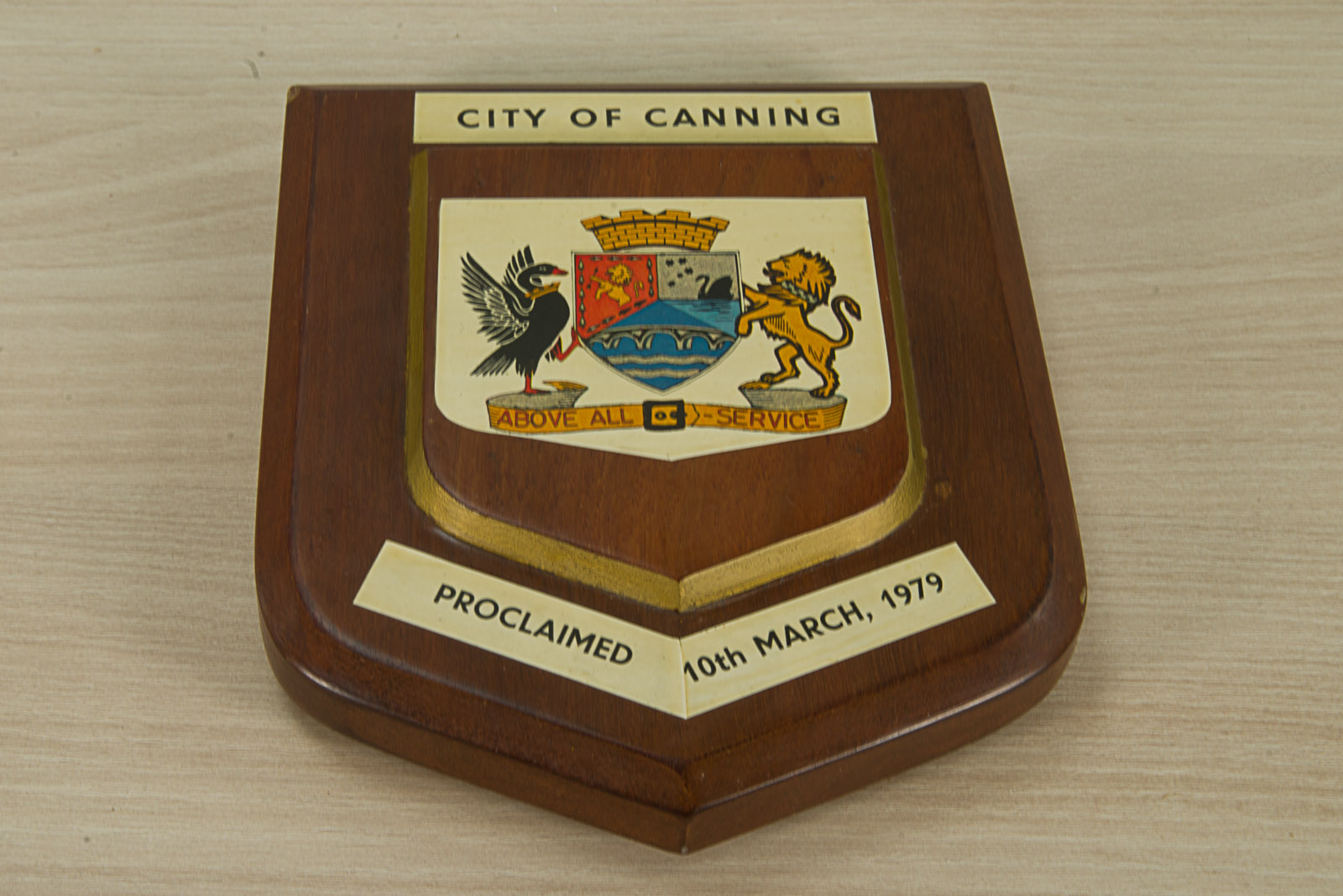
City of Canning proclamation plaque

A short-lived attempt to create a town trust for the Canning District lasted from 1843-1847, before it was dissolved. The area continued to develop under the control of a Central Board of Works until, in 1871, the Canning Road District was established under the District Roads Act 1871.

The City of Canning originated as the Municipality of Queen's Park, which was established on 1 July 1907 when the original Canning Road District was divided into two and split into the Queen's Park municipality and the Gosnells Road District (later to become the City of Gosnells). It was renamed the Queen's Park Road District on 5 November 1913.

It was renamed again to become the second Canning Road District on 17 June 1921, and received a large amount of land from the abolished Jandakot Road District on 30 November 1923. On 1 July 1961, Canning Road District became the Shire of Canning under the Local Government Act 1960, which reformed all remaining road districts into shires. On 4 December 1970 it gained town status as the Town of Canning and assumed its current name when it gained city status on 10 March 1979.

In 1974 the then-Town of Canning brought heritage registered Woodles Homestead to create a local Heritage museum.

In late 2012, an inquiry against the Canning City Council launched by the State Government's Department of Local Government resulted in a 476-page report "pointing to widespread dysfunction, micromanagement and alleged serious governance irregularities." As a result, the State Government ordered the suspension of the Council, appointing Linton Reynolds to replace it as City Commissioner.

Two years later, in mid-September 2014, it was reported that the State Government had sacked the four remaining Canning councillors, to be replaced by a panel of three new Commissioners upon the end of Commissioner Reynolds' tenure on 16 September. As part of the Department of Local Governments' plans, in which the number of local councils would have been reduced drastically, it was announced that the City of Canning would be split up and merged into neighbouring local areas, including the City of Gosnells and City of Melville. Since the failure of the state government's council merger process, the governor's order for the merger has been revoked.

== Wards ==
The city is divided into five wards with each ward electing two councillors while the mayor is directly elected.

- Mason Ward (Bentley, East Cannington, Queens Park, St James and Welshpool)
- Bannister Ward (Riverton, Rossmoyne and Shelley)
- Beeliar Ward (Leeming and Willetton)
- Nicholson Ward (Canning Vale and Parkwood)
- Beeloo Ward (Cannington, Ferndale, Lynwood and Wilson)

== Suburbs ==
The suburbs of the City of Canning with population and size figures based on the most recent Australian census:

Suburb	Population	Area	Map
Bentley *	9,051 (SAL 2021)	5.4 km^{2} (2.1 sq mi)	
Canning Vale *	34,504 (SAL 2021)	25.4 km^{2} (9.8 sq mi)	
Cannington	6,875 (SAL 2021)	4.1 km^{2} (1.6 sq mi)	
East Cannington	6,512 (SAL 2021)	2.8 km^{2} (1.1 sq mi)	
Ferndale	4,457 (SAL 2021)	3.3 km^{2} (1.3 sq mi)	
Leeming *	10,883 (SAL 2021)	7.5 km^{2} (2.9 sq mi)	
Lynwood	3,541 (SAL 2021)	1.8 km^{2} (0.69 sq mi)	
Parkwood	5,995 (SAL 2021)	3.6 km^{2} (1.4 sq mi)	
Queens Park	7,268 (SAL 2021)	2.7 km^{2} (1.0 sq mi)	
Riverton	6,078 (SAL 2021)	2.7 km^{2} (1.0 sq mi)	
Rossmoyne	3,638 (SAL 2021)	1.6 km^{2} (0.62 sq mi)	
St James *	4,894 (SAL 2021)	1.8 km^{2} (0.69 sq mi)	
Shelley	4,795 (SAL 2021)	2.1 km^{2} (0.81 sq mi)	
Welshpool *	16 (SAL 2021)	8.3 km^{2} (3.2 sq mi)	
Willetton	19,262 (SAL 2021)	8.7 km^{2} (3.4 sq mi)	
Wilson	6,608 (SAL 2021)	3.8 km^{2} (1.5 sq mi)	

( * indicates suburb partially located within City)

== Population ==
Historical population

Year	Pop.	±% p.a.
1911	1,207	—
1921	2,006	+5.21%
1933	3,208	+3.99%
1947	5,203	+3.51%
1954	13,419	+14.49%
1961	17,701	+4.04%
1966	23,604	+5.92%
1971	35,382	+8.43%
1976	43,337	+4.14%

Year	Pop.	±% p.a.
1981	52,816	+4.04%
1986	60,736	+2.83%
1991	65,697	+1.58%
1996	67,875	+0.65%
2001	72,961	+1.46%
2006	77,305	+1.16%
2011	85,514	+2.04%
2016	90,184	+1.07%
2021	95,860	+1.23%

== Heritage-listed places ==
As of 2024, 107 places are heritage-listed in the City of Canning, of which eight are on the State Register of Heritage Places, among them Castledare Boys' Home and Woodloes Homestead.

== Sister cities ==
- Casoli, Abruzzo, Italy (2010)

Canning also shares a friendship agreement with Fresagrandinaria, Abruzzo, Italy.
