= Westfield Carousel =

Shopping centre in Cannington, Western Australia

Westfield Carousel Shopping Centre
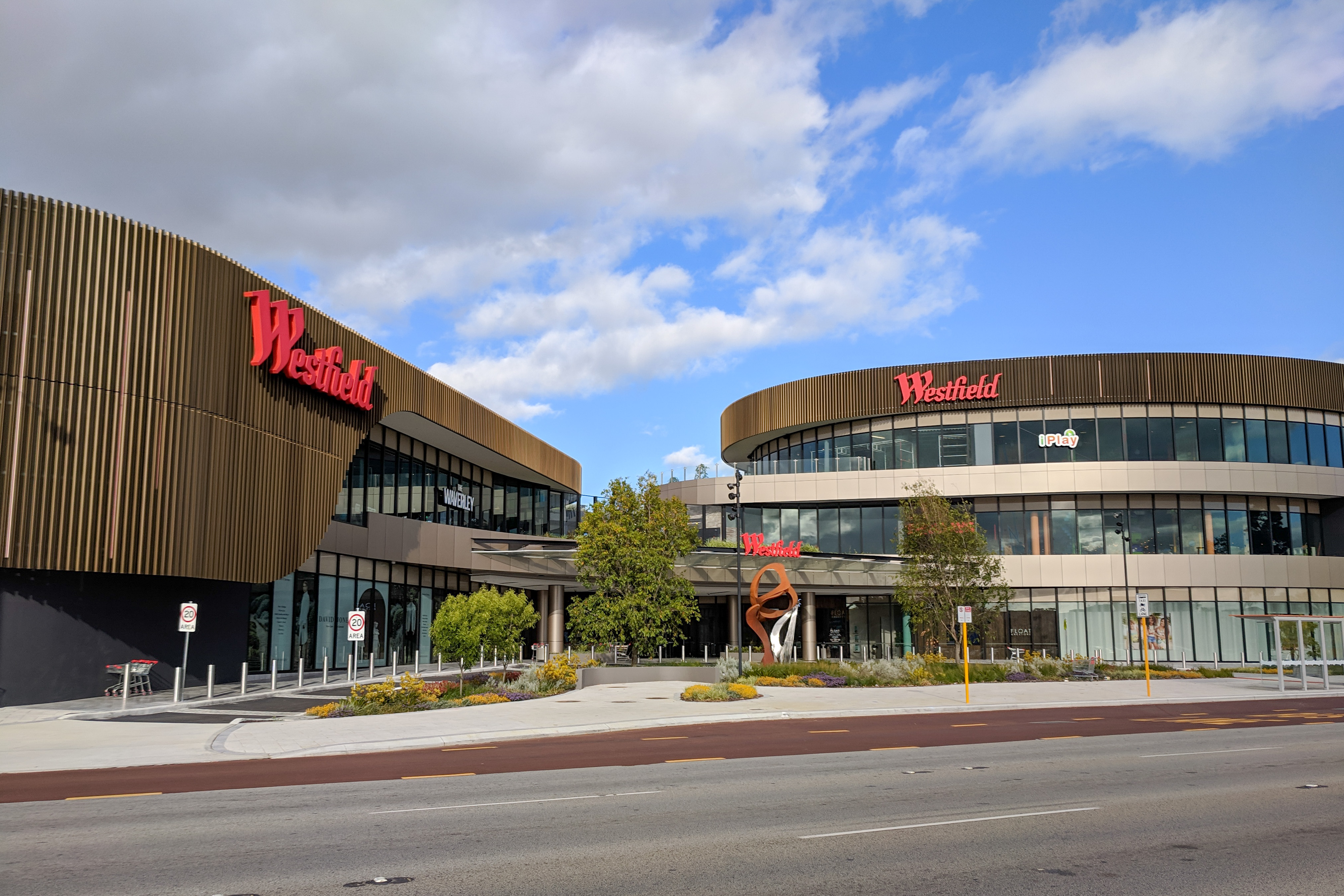
- Albany Highway facade of Westfield Carousel
- Location: Cannington, Western Australia
- Coordinates: 32°01′12″S 115°56′18″E
- Address: Albany Highway & Cecil Avenue
- Opened: 1972
- Manager: Scentre Group
- Owner: Scentre Group
- Num. of stores: 362
- Num. of anchor tenants: 9
- Floor area: 110,000 square metres (1,200,000 sq ft)
- Floors: 3
- Parking: 4,300
- Public transit: Cannington station
- Website: Official website

Westfield Carousel is an Australian shopping centre in the Perth suburb of Cannington. It is located approximately 12 kilometres (7.5 mi) from the Perth central business district on the Albany Highway and approximately 600 metres (2,000 ft) from Cannington railway station. Following a redevelopment in 2018, Westfield Carousel became the largest shopping centre in Western Australia. This was since surpassed by the redevelopment of Karrinyup Shopping Centre, which is subsequently expected to be overtaken by the approved but incomplete expansion of Westfield Booragoon.

== History ==
Westfield Carousel Shopping Centre was built in 1972 and originally contained 80 shops, a hotel, three takeaway food shops, a KFC, a Coles supermarket, a Boans (later acquired by Myer), Aherns (later acquired by David Jones) and Walsh's department stores. In 1973, a freestanding Target store opened. In 1979, an extension included connection of the existing centre to the Target, Coles and new speciality stores.

The original centre incorporated the site of Boans Waverley, the first suburban Boans branch, which opened in 1959. It also later incorporated the Waverley Hotel, which stood on the corner of Albany Highway and Cecil Road (now Cecil Avenue). As at 1995, it was owned by Bankers Trust. It was purchased by the Westfield Group in 1996.

=== 1987 to 1990 ===
In the late 1980s, Boans was taken over by Myer, becoming the chain's third department store in Western Australia. The Aherns store was also replaced with Myer in the 1980s. With two Myer locations in the shopping centre, one was used for fashion (the former Boans near Albany Highway) and one for homeware and furniture (the former Aherns). Reconfiguration of tenancies occurred in 1987, and Walsh's was replaced by Treasureway.

In 1990, Hoyts 8 Cinema was opened as a freestanding building near Carousel Road. This was one of the first suburban cinemas in Perth.

=== 1998 to 1999 ===
In 1998, a $200 million redevelopment and expansion began to double the size of the complex, which made it Western Australia's biggest shopping centre. This development included a Kmart, Coles, Rebel Sport, Lincraft, Harris Scarfe, Red Dot Stores, relocated Woolworths, consolidated Myer store, new Hoyts Cinema and the Al Fresco dining area with four dining retailers, a new food court and over 100 new retailers. Some mini-major stores were added to the older parts of the complex, such as Red Dot Stores and Best & Less. The complete centre underwent refurbishment throughout 1999.

=== 2000s ===
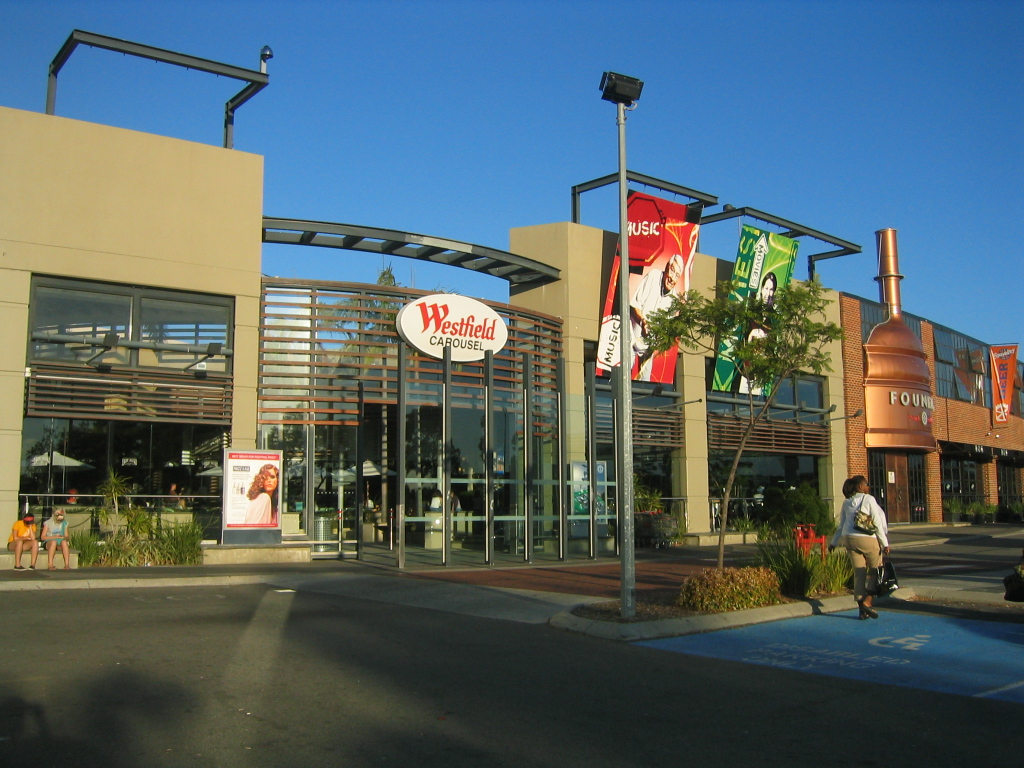
Entrance to Westfield Carousel in 2005

Further minor redevelopment occurred in the 2000s. Harris Scarfe closed in 2001 and was replaced with a larger Red Dot, Chain Reaction, Retravision and Drummond Golf. This portion of the centre was further reconfigured in 2008, following the departure of Lincraft, Red Dot and Chain Reaction. The minor redevelopment included a new mall with JB Hi-Fi, Kathmandu, The Reject Shop, Good Life Health Clubs and a number of banks and restaurants.

=== 2010s ===
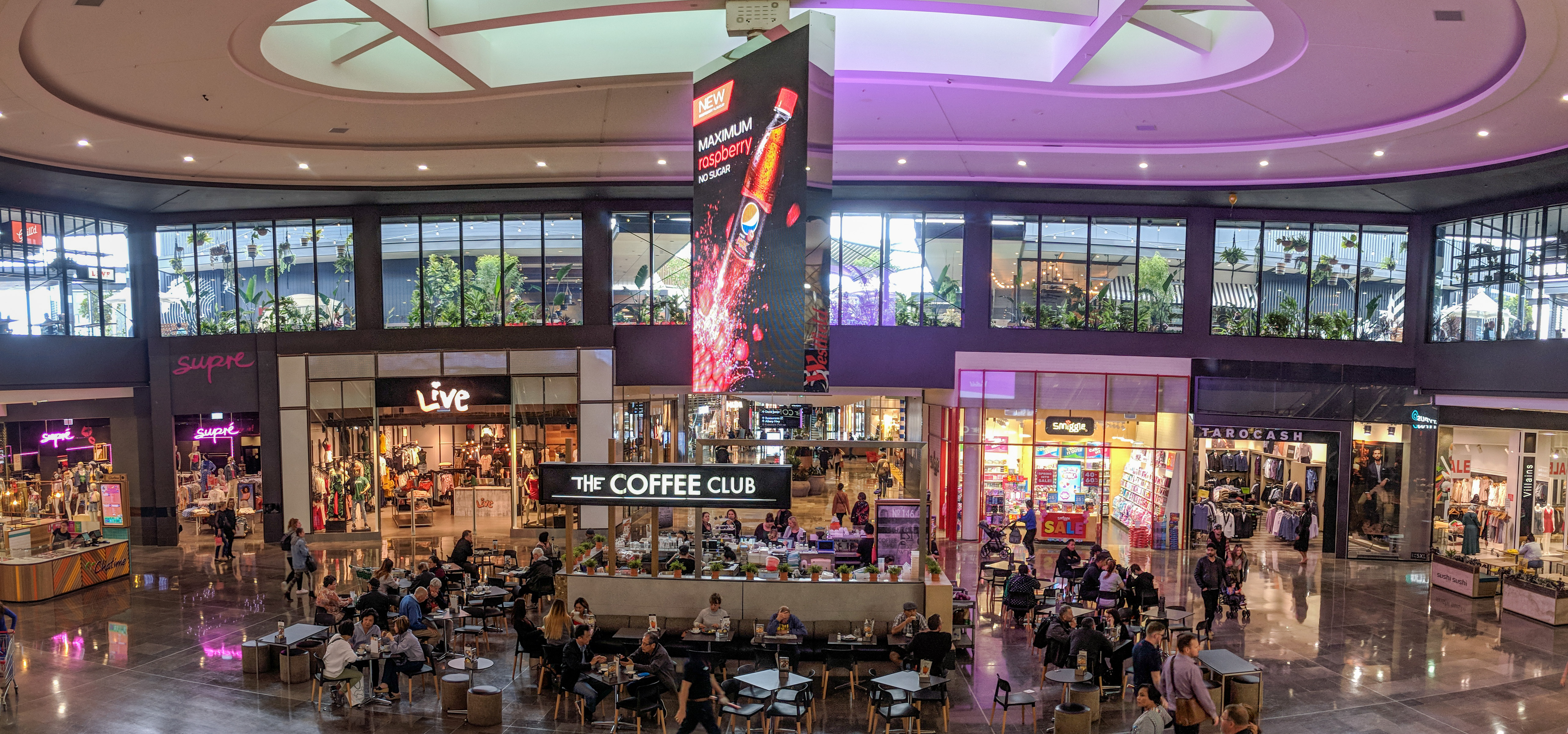
Main atrium of Westfield Carousel, near Hoyts Cinemas and Coles

In 2015, Rebel was refurbished. Later that year, an iPlay arcade opened next to the cinema. In June 2016, Red Dot Stores opened near Best & Less. The food court, amenities and car park were also upgraded and opened late 2016.

In early 2017, construction commenced on a $350 million redevelopment of Westfield Carousel. The introduction of David Jones was planned to anchor a new fashion mall home to more than 60 new stores, a multi-deck carpark, an open-air lifestyle and leisure precinct, a fully refurbished 14-screen Hoyts cinema and 12 new restaurants. Upon completion, Westfield Carousel became the largest shopping centre in Western Australia. The redevelopment was officially opened on 30 August 2018.

=== 2020s ===
From 6 October 2023, Westfield Carousel began large scale Friday night trading, becoming the first suburban shopping centre in Perth to do so. This has since ceased, with most retailers reverting solely to Thursday night trading for much of the year. A small proportion of tenants — including Coles, Kmart, and Woolworths — continue to trade late on all weeknights excluding public holidays.

In November 2026, David Jones announced that will close its store by the end of 2026.

== Facilities ==
As of July 2020, Westfield Carousel had 362 stores, 109,795 m^{2} (1,181,820 sq ft) of gross lettable area and 4,300 car spaces.

== Transport ==
The centre is located within 600 metres (2,000 ft) of Cannington railway station. Multiple Transperth bus services connect the shopping centre to the station. Additional bus services run to and from the city along Albany Highway.
