= List of State Register of Heritage Places in the City of Kalamunda =

The State Register of Heritage Places is maintained by the Heritage Council of Western Australia. As of 2026, 260 places are heritage-listed in the City of Kalamunda, of which 17 are on the State Register of Heritage Places.

== List ==
The Western Australian State Register of Heritage Places, as of 2026, lists the following 17 state registered places within the City of Kalamunda:

| Place name | Place # | Street number | Street name | Suburb or town | Co-ordinates | Notes & former names | Photo |
|---|---|---|---|---|---|---|---|
| Kalamunda Hotel and Original Kalamunda Hotel | 1251 | 43-45 | Railway Road | Kalamunda | 31.972194°S 116.059794°E | | |
| Stirk Cottage | 1253 | 18 | Kalamunda Road | Kalamunda | 31.970185°S 116.054661°E | | |
| St Brigid's College | 1261 | 200 | Lesmurdie Road | Lesmurdie | 31.996°S 116.0517°E | St Andrews School, St Andrews Convalescent Home | |
| St Swithun's Church | 1262 | 195 | Lesmurdie Road | Lesmurdie | 31.994141°S 116.052732°E | | |
| Victoria Reservoir (former) | 3510 | | Masonmill Road | Carmel | 32.042432°S 116.067074°E | | |
| Barton's Mills Prison (ruins) | 3580 | | Bartons Mill | Pickering Brook | 32.057819°S 116.208244°E | | |
| Carmel Primary School (former) | 4535 | 101 | Carmel Road | Carmel | 32.017972°S 116.084899°E | Heidelberg School, Scouts Meeting Hall | |
| Levi Wallis Cottage | 9012 | 251 | Stanhope Road | Walliston | 31.995387°S 116.077247°E | | |
| Lesmurdie House | 10384 | 12 | Catherine Place | Lesmurdie | 31.997852°S 116.051163°E | | |
| Paxwold Girl Guides Camp | 10411 | 120 | Gilchrist Road | Lesmurdie | 32.020953°S 116.041045°E | Paxwold Girl Guides Association Memorial, Training Centre | |
| Weston Grave | 10486 | 20 | Masonmill Road | Carmel | 32.031339°S 116.073103°E | | |
| Perth Observatory | 10551 | 317 & 337 | Walnut Road | Bickley | 32.007778°S 116.135278°E | WA State Government Observatory | |
| Statham's Quarry | 10570 | | Ridge Hill Road | Gooseberry Hill | 31.934167°S 116.048056°E | City of Perth's Quarry, Darlington Range Quarries | |
| Floriculture Nursery (former) | 15265 | 120 | Heath Road | Kalamunda | 31.973407°S 116.037358°E | Asphodel, House and former Floriculture Nursery | |
| Lesmurdie Group | 16819 | 195 & 200 | Lesmurdie Road and 12 Catherine Place | Lesmurdie | | Consists of St Brigid's College, St Swithun's Church and Lesmurdie House | |
| Old Kalamunda Hotel | 24787 | 43 | Railway Road | Kalamunda | 31.972194°S 116.059794°E | | |
| Kalamunda Hotel | 24797 | 43 | Railway Road | Kalamunda | 31.972194°S 116.059794°E | | |
