= List of Perth suburbs =

There are more than 350 suburbs in the Perth metropolitan region (colloquially known as Perth, the capital city of Western Australia) as of 2021. The name and boundary of a locality (commonly referred to as a suburb in the metropolitan region) is determined under the authority of the Minister of Lands in Western Australia, and form an official component of addresses.

Some of the suburbs are contained within two or three local government areas – these have been marked and cross-referenced.

Suburb	Local government area
Alexander Heights	Wanneroo
Alfred Cove	Melville
Alkimos	Wanneroo
Anketell	Kwinana
Applecross	Melville
Ardross	Melville
Armadale	Armadale
Ascot	Belmont
Ashby	Wanneroo
Ashendon	Armadale
Ashfield	Bassendean
Attadale	Melville
Atwell	Cockburn
Aubin Grove	Cockburn
Aveley	Swan
Bailup	Mundaring
Balcatta	Stirling
Baldivis	Rockingham
Balga	Stirling
Ballajura	Swan
Banjup	Cockburn
Banksia Grove	Wanneroo
Baskerville	Swan
Bassendean	Bassendean
Bateman	Melville
Bayswater	Bayswater
Beaconsfield	Fremantle
Beckenham	Gosnells
Bedford	Bayswater
Bedfordale	Armadale
Beechboro	Swan
Beechina	Mundaring
Beeliar	Cockburn
Beldon	Joondalup
Belhus	Swan
Bellevue	Mundaring
Bellevue	Swan
Belmont	Belmont
Bentley	Canning
Bentley	Victoria Park
Bennett Springs	Swan
Bertram	Kwinana
Bibra Lake	Cockburn
Bickley	Kalamunda
Bicton	Melville
Booragoon	Melville
Boya	Mundaring
Brabham	Swan
Brentwood	Melville
Brigadoon	Swan
Brookdale	Armadale
Bull Creek	Melville
Bullsbrook	Swan
Burns Beach	Joondalup
Burswood	Victoria Park
Bushmead	Swan
Butler	Wanneroo
Byford	Serpentine-Jarrahdale
Calista	Kwinana
Camillo	Armadale
Canning Mills	Kalamunda
Canning Vale	Canning
Canning Vale	Gosnells
Cannington	Canning
Carabooda	Wanneroo
Cardup	Serpentine-Jarrahdale
Carine	Stirling
Carlisle	Victoria Park
Carmel	Kalamunda
Carramar	Wanneroo
Casuarina	Kwinana
Caversham	Swan
Champion Lakes	Armadale
Chidlow	Mundaring
Churchlands	Stirling
City Beach	Cambridge
Claremont	Claremont
Claremont	Cottesloe
Clarkson	Wanneroo
Cloverdale	Belmont
Cockburn Central	Cockburn
Como	South Perth
Connolly	Joondalup
Coogee	Cockburn
Coolbellup	Cockburn
Coolbinia	Stirling
Cooloongup	Rockingham
Cottesloe	Cottesloe
Craigie	Joondalup
Crawley	Perth
Cullacabardee	Swan
Currambine	Joondalup
Daglish	Subiaco
Dalkeith	Nedlands
Darch	Wanneroo
Darling Downs	Serpentine-Jarrahdale
Darlington	Mundaring
Dayton	Swan
Dianella	Stirling
Doubleview	Stirling
Doobarda	Armadale
Duncraig	Joondalup
East Cannington	Canning
East Fremantle	East Fremantle
East Perth	Perth
East Perth	Vincent
East Rockingham	Rockingham
East Victoria Park	Victoria Park
Eden Hill	Bassendean
Edgewater	Joondalup
Eglinton	Wanneroo
Ellenbrook	Swan
Embleton	Bayswater
Ferndale	Canning
Floreat	Cambridge
Floreat	Nedlands
Forrestdale	Armadale
Forrestfield	Kalamunda
Fremantle	Fremantle
Gidgegannup	Swan
Girrawheen	Wanneroo
Glen Forrest	Mundaring
Glendalough	Stirling
Gnangara	Wanneroo
Golden Bay	Rockingham
Gooseberry Hill	Kalamunda
Gorrie	Mundaring
Gosnells	Gosnells
Greenmount	Mundaring
Greenwood	Joondalup
Guildford	Swan
Gwelup	Stirling
Hacketts Gully	Kalamunda
Hamersley	Stirling
Hamilton Hill	Cockburn
Hammond Park	Cockburn
Harrisdale	Armadale
Haynes	Armadale
Hazelmere	Swan
Heathridge	Joondalup
Helena Valley	Mundaring
Henderson	Cockburn
Henley Brook	Swan
Herdsman	Stirling
Herne Hill	Swan
High Wycombe	Kalamunda
Highgate	Vincent
Hilbert	Armadale
Hillarys	Joondalup
Hillman	Rockingham
Hilton	Fremantle
Hocking	Wanneroo
Hope Valley	Kwinana
Hopeland	Serpentine-Jarrahdale
Hovea	Mundaring
Huntingdale	Gosnells
Garden Island	Rockingham
Iluka	Joondalup
Inglewood	Stirling
Innaloo	Stirling
Jandabup	Wanneroo
Jandakot	Cockburn
Jane Brook	Swan
Jarrahdale	Serpentine-Jarrahdale
Jindalee	Wanneroo
Jolimont	Cambridge
Jolimont	Subiaco
Joondalup	Joondalup
Joondanna	Stirling
Kalamunda	Kalamunda
Kallaroo	Joondalup
Karawara	South Perth
Kardinya	Melville
Karnup	Rockingham
Karragullen	Armadale
Karrakatta	Nedlands
Karrakup	Serpentine-Jarrahdale
Karrinyup	Stirling
Kelmscott	Armadale
Kensington	South Perth
Kensington	Victoria Park
Kenwick	Gosnells
Keralup	Murray
Keralup	Rockingham
Kewdale	Belmont
Kewdale	Kalamunda
Keysbrook	Serpentine-Jarrahdale
Kiara	Swan
Kingsley	Joondalup
Kinross	Joondalup
Koondoola	Wanneroo
Koongamia	Swan
Kwinana Beach	Kwinana
Kwinana Town Centre	Kwinana
Lake Coogee	Cockburn
Landsdale	Wanneroo
Langford	Gosnells
Lathlain	Victoria Park
Leda	Kwinana
Leederville	Vincent
Leeming	Canning
Leeming	Cockburn
Leeming	Melville
Lesmurdie	Kalamunda
Lexia	Swan
Lockridge	Swan
Lynwood	Canning
Maddington	Gosnells
Madeley	Wanneroo
Mahogany Creek	Mundaring
Maida Vale	Kalamunda
Malaga	Swan
Mandogalup	Kwinana
Manning	South Perth
Marangaroo	Wanneroo
Mardella	Serpentine-Jarrahdale
Mariginiup	Wanneroo
Marmion	Joondalup
Martin	Gosnells
Maylands	Bayswater
Medina	Kwinana
Melaleuca	Swan
Melville	Melville
Menora	Stirling
Merriwa	Wanneroo
Middle Swan	Swan
Midland	Swan
Midvale	Mundaring
Midvale	Swan
Millendon	Swan
Mindarie	Wanneroo
Mirrabooka	Stirling
Morley	Bayswater
Mosman Park	Mosman Park
Mount Claremont	Cambridge
Mount Claremont	Nedlands
Mount Hawthorn	Vincent
Mount Helena	Mundaring
Mount Lawley	Bayswater
Mount Lawley	Stirling
Mount Lawley	Vincent
Mount Nasura	Armadale
Mount Pleasant	Melville
Mount Richon	Armadale
Mullaloo	Joondalup
Mundaring	Mundaring
Mundijong	Serpentine-Jarrahdale
Munster	Cockburn
Murdoch	Melville
Myaree	Melville
Naval Base	Kwinana
Nedlands	Nedlands
Nedlands	Subiaco
Neerabup	Wanneroo
Nollamara	Stirling
Noranda	Bayswater
North Beach	Stirling
North Coogee	Cockburn
North Fremantle	Fremantle
North Lake	Cockburn
North Perth	Vincent
Northbridge	Perth
Nowergup	Wanneroo
Oakford	Serpentine-Jarrahdale
Ocean Reef	Joondalup
O'Connor	Fremantle
Oldbury	Serpentine-Jarrahdale
Orange Grove	Gosnells
Orelia	Kwinana
Osborne Park	Stirling
Padbury	Joondalup
Palmyra	Melville
Parkerville	Mundaring
Parkwood	Canning
Parmelia	Kwinana
Paulls Valley	Kalamunda
Pearsall	Wanneroo
Peppermint Grove	Peppermint Grove
Peron	Rockingham
Perth	Perth
Perth	Vincent
Perth Airport	Belmont
Perth Airport	Swan
Piara Waters	Armadale
Pickering Brook	Kalamunda
Piesse Brook	Kalamunda
Pinjar	Wanneroo
Port Kennedy	Rockingham
Postans	Kwinana
Queens Park	Canning
Quinns Rocks	Wanneroo
Red Hill	Swan
Redcliffe	Belmont
Reservoir	Kalamunda
Ridgewood	Wanneroo
Riverton	Canning
Rivervale	Belmont
Rockingham	Rockingham
Roleystone	Armadale
Rottnest Island	Cockburn
Rossmoyne	Canning
Safety Bay	Rockingham
Salter Point	South Perth
Samson	Fremantle
Sawyers Valley	Mundaring
Scarborough	Stirling
Secret Harbour	Rockingham
Serpentine	Serpentine-Jarrahdale
Seville Grove	Armadale
Shelley	Canning
Shenton Park	Nedlands
Shenton Park	Subiaco
Shoalwater	Rockingham
Sinagra	Wanneroo
Singleton	Rockingham
Sorrento	Joondalup
South Fremantle	Fremantle
South Guildford	Swan
South Lake	Cockburn
South Perth	South Perth
Southern River	Gosnells
Spearwood	Cockburn
St James	Canning
St James	Victoria Park
Stirling	Stirling
Stoneville	Mundaring
Stratton	Swan
Subiaco	Cambridge
Subiaco	Subiaco
Success	Cockburn
Swan View	Mundaring
Swan View	Swan
Swanbourne	Claremont
Swanbourne	Nedlands
Tamala Park	Wanneroo
Tapping	Wanneroo
The Lakes	Mundaring
The Spectacles	Kwinana
The Vines	Swan
Thornlie	Gosnells
Treeby	Cockburn
Trigg	Stirling
Tuart Hill	Stirling
Two Rocks	Wanneroo
Upper Swan	Swan
Victoria Park	Victoria Park
Viveash	Swan
Waikiki	Rockingham
Walliston	Kalamunda
Wandi	Kwinana
Wangara	Wanneroo
Wanneroo	Wanneroo
Warnbro	Rockingham
Warwick	Joondalup
Waterford	South Perth
Watermans Bay	Stirling
Wattle Grove	Kalamunda
Wattleup	Cockburn
Wellard	Kwinana
Welshpool	Canning
Welshpool	Victoria Park
Wembley Downs	Cambridge
Wembley Downs	Stirling
Wembley	Cambridge
Wembley	Stirling
West Leederville	Cambridge
West Perth	Perth
West Perth	Vincent
West Swan	Swan
Westminster	Stirling
Whitby	Serpentine-Jarrahdale
White Gum Valley	Fremantle
Whiteman	Swan
Willagee	Melville
Willetton	Canning
Wilson	Canning
Winthrop	Melville
Woodbridge	Swan
Woodlands	Stirling
Woodvale	Joondalup
Woodvale	Wanneroo
Wooroloo	Mundaring
Wungong	Armadale
Yanchep	Wanneroo
Yangebup	Cockburn
Yokine	Stirling

== See also ==
- 1955 Plan for the Metropolitan Region, Perth and Fremantle
- Greater Perth
- List of islands of Perth, Western Australia
- Metropolitan Region Scheme
- Perth metropolitan region
- Western Australian Planning Commission
