= Orange Grove, Western Australia =

Orange Grove
- Suburb
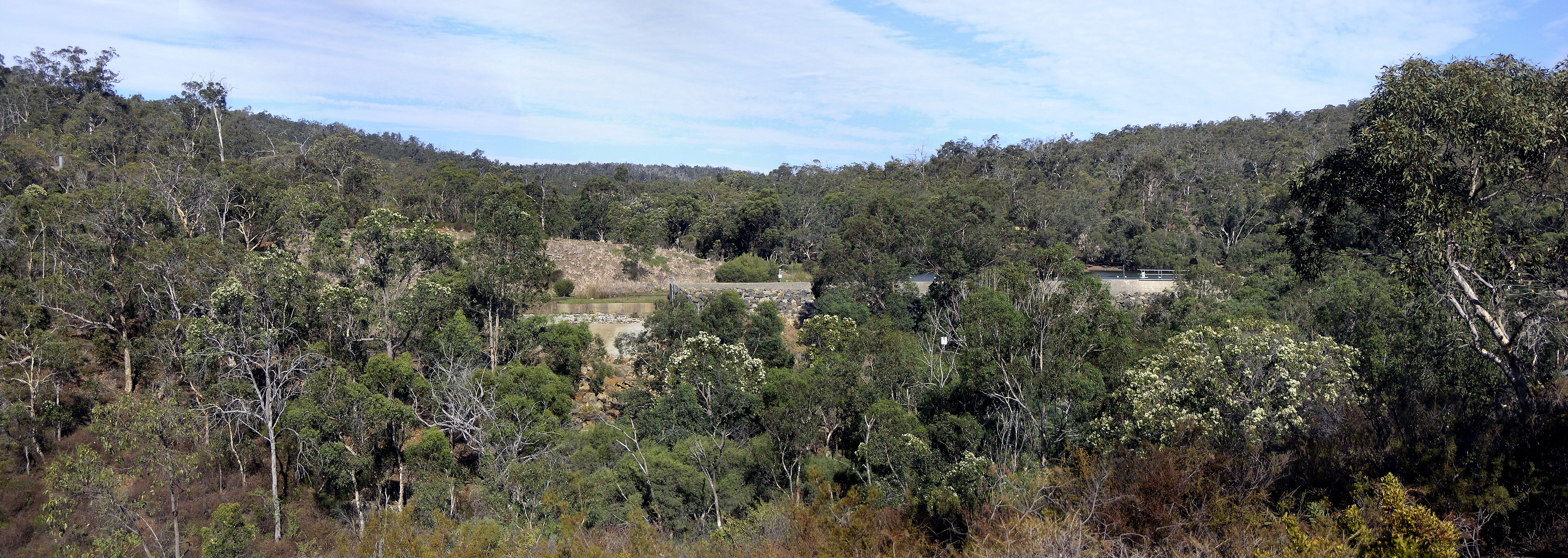
- Bickley Dam and Reservoir panorama
- Interactive map of Orange Grove
- Coordinates: 32.022°S 116.027°E
- Country: Australia
- State: Western Australia
- City: Perth
- LGA: City of Gosnells

Government
  - State electorates: Forrestfield; Kalamunda
  - Federal division: Bullwinkel

Population
  - Total: 726 (SAL 2021)
- Postcode: 6109
Suburbs around Orange Grove
Wattle Grove	Forrestfield	Lesmurdie
Kenwick	Orange Grove	Carmel
Maddington	Martin	Canning Mills

Orange Grove is a suburb of Perth, Western Australia in the City of Gosnells.

Despite the name, Bickley Dam is situated within Orange Grove. It was constructed in 1921 on Bickley Brook, a tributary of the Canning River.

This created Bickley Reservoir, which has a capacity of 60 megalitres (16 million US gallons). It is a source of drinking water for the Integrated Water Supply System (IWSS) which services Perth, Mandurah, Pinjarra, Harvey and the Goldfields and Agricultural regions. It was used as a direct source of water for Perth until 1994. Since 1994, however, it has operated as a pumpback for Victoria Reservoir due to low pipeline pressure and poor water quality.

== Transport ==
=== Bus ===
- 279 Maddington Central to Kalamunda Bus Station – serves Kelvin Road
