= Bickley Pumpback Dam =

Dam in Western Australia

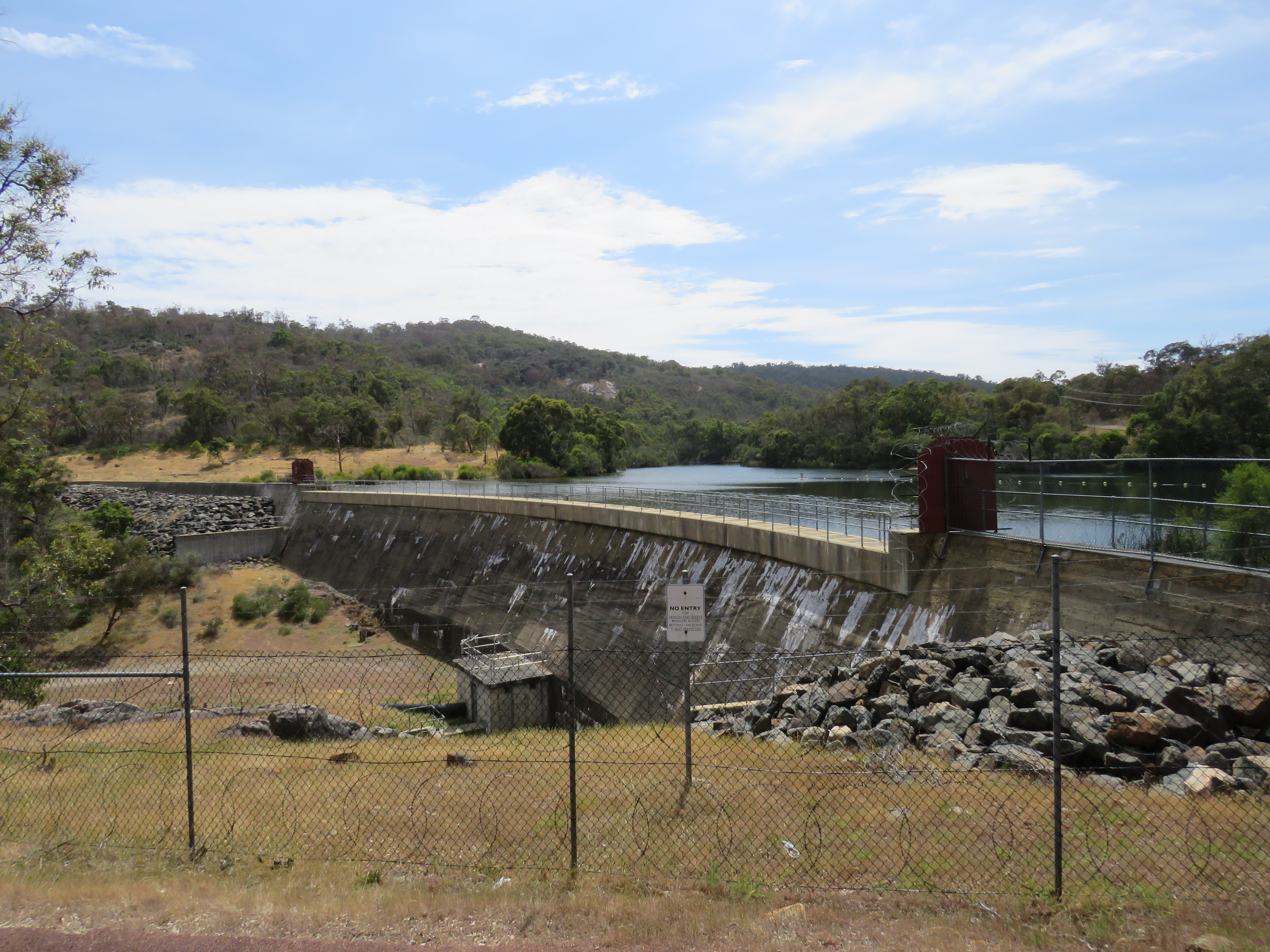
- Bickley Reservoir and Dam in November 2024
- Interactive map of Bickley Pumpback Dam
- Location: Orange Grove, City of Gosnells, Western Australia
- Coordinates: 32°01′47″S 116°02′10″E

Western Australia Heritage Register
- Official name: Bickley Brook Reservoir Group
- Type: City of Gosnells Municipal Inventory
- Designated: 13 September 2016
- Reference no.: 23496

Bickley Pumpback Dam, known also as the Lower Bickley Brook reservoir, is located in Perth, Western Australia.

Bickley is a suburb situated on the Darling Scarp. It was constructed in 1921 to improve Perth's water supply; the executive engineer on the project was Arthur Hillman.

The dam site was also used as a campsite for children in the 1950s.

The water collected in the dam was at one time pumped back into Victoria Dam, where it was treated, then gravitated or pumped into the metropolitan trunk main system for distribution. However the current quality of the water, collected within the reservoir, is considered unsuitable for consumption. As such it is no longer transferred for addition to Perth's Integrated Water Supply System.

The area around the reservoir, including the dam, recreation camp, Hardinge Park and the pipe track from Victoria Dam are on the City of Gosnells heritage list.
