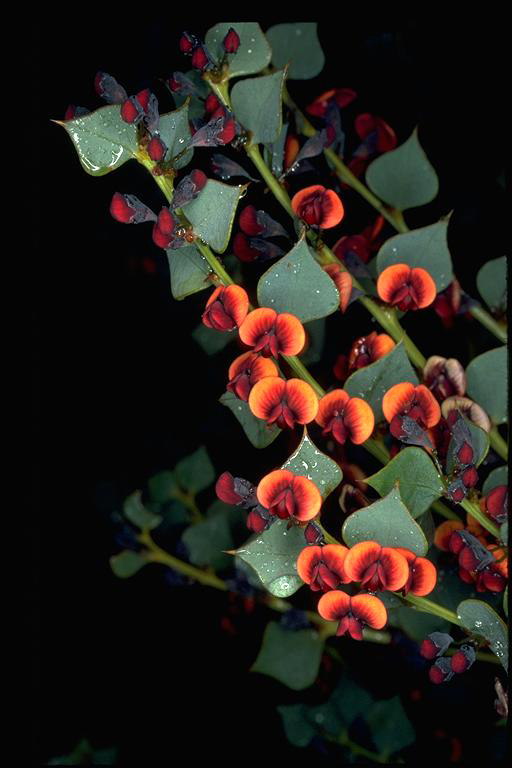
- In Gooseberry Hill National Park

Scientific classification
- Kingdom: Plantae
- Clade: Tracheophytes
- Clade: Angiosperms
- Clade: Eudicots
- Clade: Rosids
- Order: Fabales
- Family: Fabaceae
- Subfamily: Faboideae
- Genus: Daviesia
- Species: D. rhombifolia

Binomial name
- Daviesia rhombifolia Meisn.

= Daviesia rhombifolia =

Species of legume

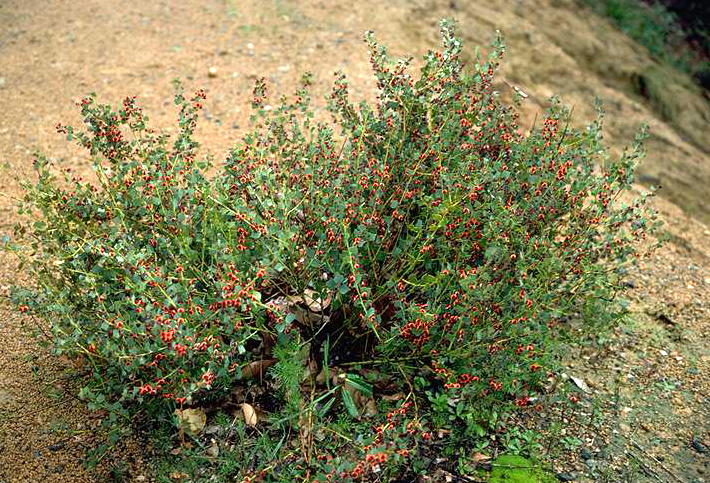
Habit

Daviesia rhombifolia is a species of flowering plant in the family Fabaceae and is endemic to the south-west of Western Australia. It is a bushy, spreading shrub with scattered, rhombus-shaped, sharply-pointed phyllodes, and orange and dark red flowers.

== Description ==
Daviesia rhombifolia is a bushy, spreading shrub that typically grows to a height of 30–80 cm (12–31 in) and has many stems. Its phyllodes are scattered, rhombus-shaped, 8–30 mm (0.31–1.18 in) long, 5–25 mm (0.20–0.98 in) wide and sharply pointed. The flowers are arranged in one or two groups of three flowers in leaf axils on a peduncle up to 0.5 mm (0.020 in) long, each flower on a pedicel 3–6 mm (0.12–0.24 in) long. The sepals are 3.0–4.5 mm (0.12–0.18 in) long and joined at the base, the upper two joined for most of their length, the lower three with lobes about 0.5 mm (0.020 in) long. The standard petal is broadly elliptic with a notched tip, 5–6 mm (0.20–0.24 in) long, 5.5–6.5 mm (0.22–0.26 in) wide, and orange with a red base. The wings are 4.0–5.5 mm (0.16–0.22 in) long and orange-red, the keel 4.0–5.5 mm (0.16–0.22 in) long and red. Flowering occurs from July to September and the fruit is a triangular pod 12–15 mm (0.47–0.59 in) long.

== Taxonomy ==
Daviesia rhombifolia was first formally described in 1844 by Carl Meissner in Lehmann's Plantae Preissianae. The specific epithet (rhombifolia) means "rhombus-leaved".

== Distribution and habitat ==
This daviesia grows in forest or kwongan between Perth, Merredin, Lake King and Munglinup in the Avon Wheatbelt, Jarrah Forest, Mallee, and Swan Coastal Plain biogeographic regions of south-western Western Australia.

== Conservation status ==
Daviesia rhombifolia is listed as "not threatened" by the Government of Western Australia Department of Biodiversity, Conservation and Attractions.
