= CRI Perth =

Radio station in Perth, Western Australia

Perth FM 104.9 was a Chinese radio station in Perth, Western Australia. It was part of the CAMG Media Group and broadcast primarily in Mandarin. It broadcast from 12:00–22:00 local time. For the remainder of time broadcasting was covered by Perth Chinese Radio FM 90.5. In 2017 the Chinese media was decommissioned and from 2019 the frequency for FM 104.9 was taken over by Indian Media Group and Indian music has been broadcast on it since then.

It is sited in Yokine, a suburb of Perth. The station launched on 17 June 2007.

Perth FM 90.5 is Perth radio station, part of the CAMG Media Group. This station broadcast primarily in English, relaying China Radio International.

Its 5 kW transmitter is sited in Bickley, another suburb of Perth.
