= Reservoir, Western Australia =

Reservoir
- Suburb
- Interactive map of Reservoir
- Coordinates: 31.987°S 116.177°E
- Country: Australia
- State: Western Australia
- City: Perth
- LGA: City of Kalamunda
- Established: 1997

Government
  - State electorate: Kalamunda
  - Federal division: Bullwinkel

Population
  - Total: 0 (SAL 2021)
- Postcode: 6076
Suburbs around Reservoir
Paulls Valley	Mundaring	Sawyers Valley
Hacketts Gully	Reservoir
Bickley	Pickering Brook

Reservoir is a non-residential suburb of Perth, Western Australia, and is located within the City of Kalamunda. It contains Lake C. Y. O'Connor, the lake created by Mundaring Weir, and was established as a suburb of Perth in 1997.
