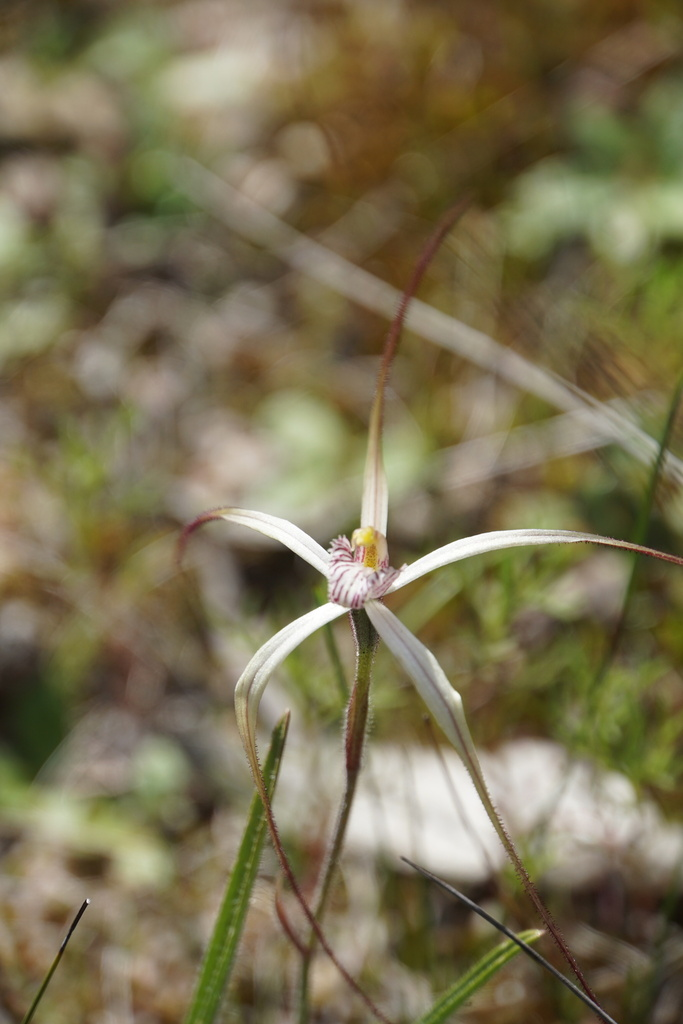
- In Cranbrook

Scientific classification
- Kingdom: Plantae
- Clade: Embryophytes
- Clade: Tracheophytes
- Clade: Spermatophytes
- Clade: Angiosperms
- Clade: Monocots
- Order: Asparagales
- Family: Orchidaceae
- Subfamily: Orchidoideae
- Tribe: Diurideae
- Genus: Caladenia
- Species: C. hiemalis

Binomial name
- Caladenia hiemalis Hopper & A.P.Br.

Synonyms
- Calonemorchis hiemalis (Hopper & A.P.Br.) D.L.Jones & M.A.Clem.; Calonema hiemalis (Hopper & A.P.Br.) D.L.Jones & M.A.Clem.; Jonesiopsis hiemalis (Hopper & A.P.Br.) D.L.Jones & M.A.Clem.

= Caladenia hiemalis =

Dwarf common spider orchid

Species of orchid

Caladenia hiemalis, commonly known as the dwarf common spider orchid, is a species of orchid endemic to the south-west of Western Australia. It has a single, hairy leaf and one or two, cream-coloured flowers with a small, red-striped labellum. It has an early flowering period and its flowering is stimulated by summer fires.

== Description ==
Caladenia hiemalis is a terrestrial, perennial, deciduous, herb with an underground tuber and a single erect, hairy leaf, 40–120 mm (2–5 in) long and about 3 mm (0.1 in) wide. One or two flowers 70–100 mm (3–4 in) long and 60–100 mm (2–4 in) wide are borne on a stalk 150–300 mm (6–10 in) tall. The flowers are cream-coloured with red markings and the sepals and petals have long, thread-like tips. The dorsal sepal is erect, 45–65 mm (2–3 in) long and 2–3 mm (0.08–0.1 in) wide at the base. The lateral sepals are about the same size as the dorsal sepal but curve stiffly downwards. The petals are 35–60 mm (1–2 in) long and about 2 mm (0.08 in) wide and held horizontally. The labellum is 8–10 mm (0.3–0.4 in) long and 5–8 mm (0.2–0.3 in) wide and white with red stripes. The sides of the labellum have short teeth and the tip of the labellum is curled under. There are two rows of six to twelve cream-coloured, anvil-shaped calli with red markings along the centre of the labellum. Flowering occurs from June to early August, often following bushfires the previous summer.

== Taxonomy and naming ==
Caladenia hiemalis was first described in 2001 by Stephen Hopper and Andrew Phillip Brown from a specimen collected in the Gooseberry Hill National Park and the description was published in Nuytsia. The specific epithet (hiemalis) is a Latin word meaning "of winter" or "wintry" referring to the flowering period of this orchid.

== Distribution and habitat ==
Dwarf common spider orchid occurs between Jurien Bay and Tenterden in the Avon Wheatbelt, Esperance Plains and Jarrah Forest biogeographic regions where it usually grows in wandoo woodland, usually in moist soil.

== Conservation ==
Caladenia hiemalis is classified as "not threatened" by the Government of Western Australia Department of Parks and Wildlife.
