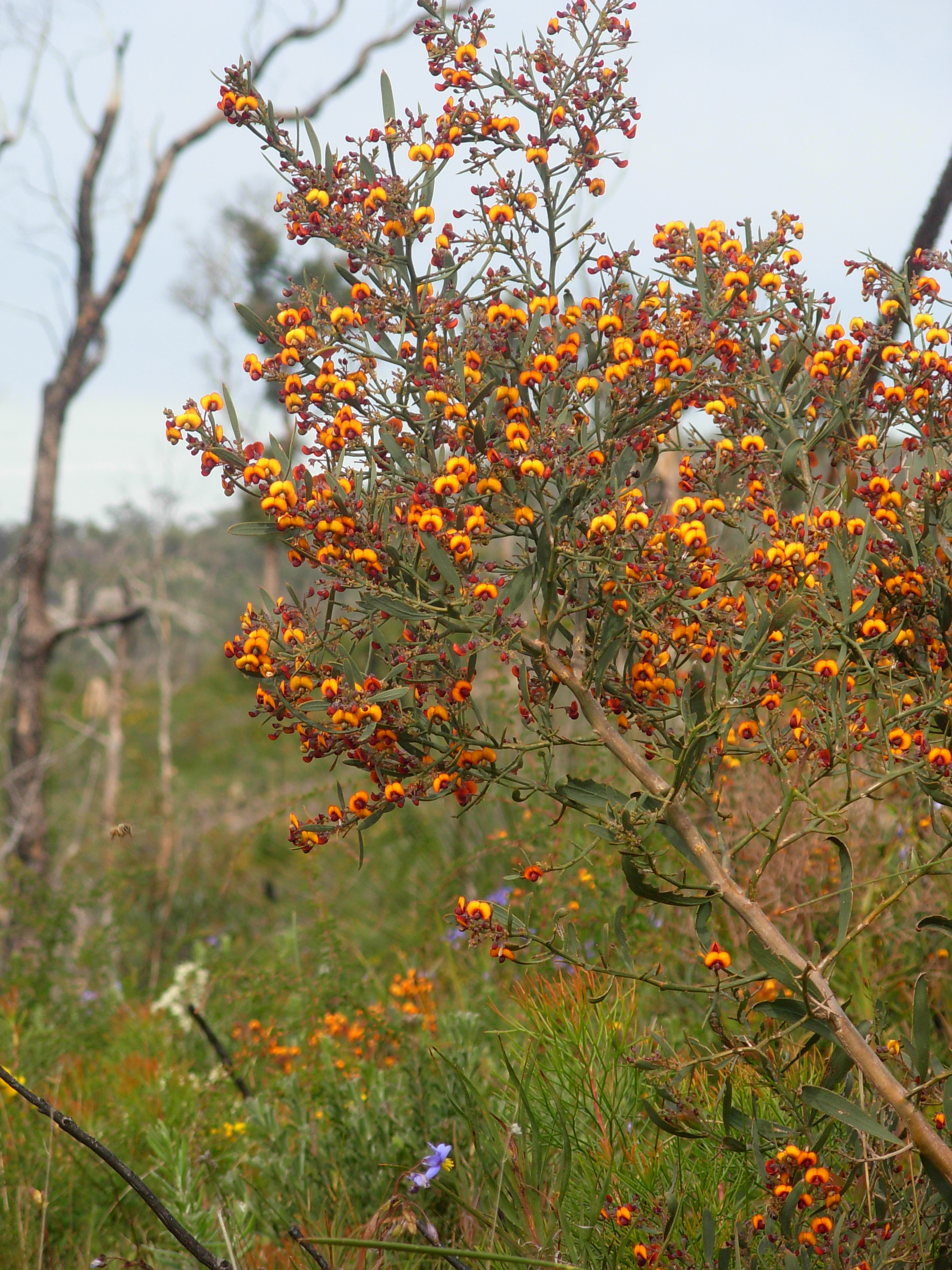
- Daviesia horrida near Statham's Quarry, Western Australia

Scientific classification
- Kingdom: Plantae
- Clade: Tracheophytes
- Clade: Angiosperms
- Clade: Eudicots
- Clade: Rosids
- Order: Fabales
- Family: Fabaceae
- Subfamily: Faboideae
- Genus: Daviesia
- Species: D. horrida

Binomial name
- Daviesia horrida Preiss ex Meisn.

= Daviesia horrida =

Prickly bitter-pea

Species of legume

Daviesia horrida, commonly known as prickly bitter-pea, is a species of flowering plant in the family Fabaceae and is endemic to the south-west of Western Australia. It is a spreading shrub with rigid, spiny branchlets, narrowly elliptic phyllodes and orange and dark red flowers.

== Description ==
Daviesia horrida is a glabrous, spreading shrub that typically grows to a height of 0.5–1.8 m (1 ft 8 in – 5 ft 11 in) and has rigid, spiny, often leafless branchlets. The phyllodes, when present are narrowly elliptic to linear, 18–130 mm (0.71–5.12 in) long and 1.5–20 mm (0.059–0.787 in) wide. The flowers are borne in a raceme of three to ten flowers in leaf axils on a peduncle about 1 mm (0.039 in) long, the rachis 1–20 mm (0.039–0.787 in) long, each flower on a pedicel 1–7 mm (0.039–0.276 in) long with overlapping bracts about 1.7 mm (0.067 in) long at the base. The sepals are 4.5–5.0 mm (0.18–0.20 in) long and joined at the base with five equal lobes. The standard petal is broadly elliptic, 8–9 mm (0.31–0.35 in) long and orange with a dark red centre, the wings 6.5–7.5 mm (0.26–0.30 in) long and dark red, and the keel 5–6 mm (0.20–0.24 in) long and dark red. Flowering occurs from July to September and the fruit is a flattened, triangular and beaked pod 15–18 mm (0.59–0.71 in) long.

== Taxonomy ==
Daviesia horrida was first formally described by Swiss botanist Carl Meissner in Johann Georg Christian Lehmann's Plantae Preissianae in 1844, from an unpublished description by Balthazar Preiss. The specific epithet (horrida) means "bristly or prickly".

== Distribution and habitat ==
Prickly bitter-pea grows in the shrubby understorey of forest in hilly terrain between Bindoon, Busselton and the Pallinup River in the Esperance Plains, Jarrah Forest, Swan Coastal Plain and Warren biogeographic regions of south-western Western Australia.
