= Hacketts Gully, Western Australia =

Hacketts Gully
- Suburb
- Interactive map of Hacketts Gully
- Coordinates: 31.980°S 116.101°E
- Country: Australia
- State: Western Australia
- City: Perth
- LGA: City of Kalamunda

Government
  - State electorate: Kalamunda
  - Federal division: Bullwinkel

Population
  - Total: 55 (SAL 2021)
- Postcode: 6076
Suburbs around Hacketts Gully
Piesse Brook	Paulls Valley	Paulls Valley
Bickley	Hacketts Gully	Reservoir
Bickley	Bickley	Reservoir

Hacketts Gully is a suburb of Perth, Western Australia, located within the City of Kalamunda. It was officially named in 1972 and commemorates an early settler and market gardener, Thomas Hackett.
