= Kalamunda Zig Zag =

Formation of former zig zag railway line

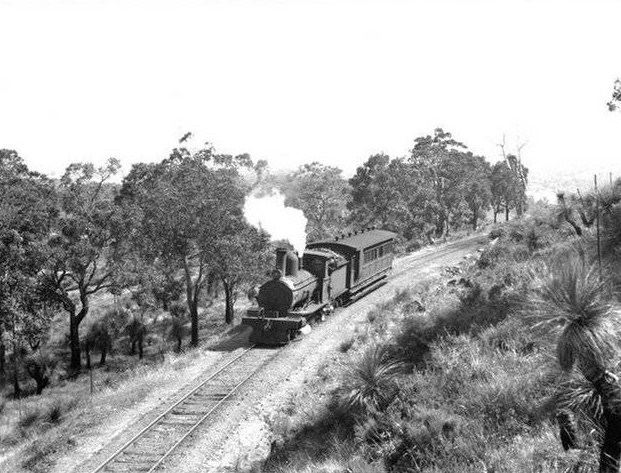
- G class locomotive on the Zig Zag, 1937

Overview
- Status: Converted to a public road
- Coordinates: 31°56′44″S 116°03′00″E
- Termini: Ridge Hill; Gooseberry Hill

Service
- Type: Zig zag railway
- System: Western Australian Government Railways

Technical
- Line length: 3 kilometres
- Track gauge: 1,067 mm (3 ft 6 in)

The Kalamunda Zig Zag was a zig zag rail line that was part of the Upper Darling Range railway line in Western Australia, opening in July 1891 and closing in July 1949. Most of it was converted to a public road in 1952, part of which is now a tourist route called Zig Zag Scenic Drive, that offers views of Perth from the hills.

== History ==
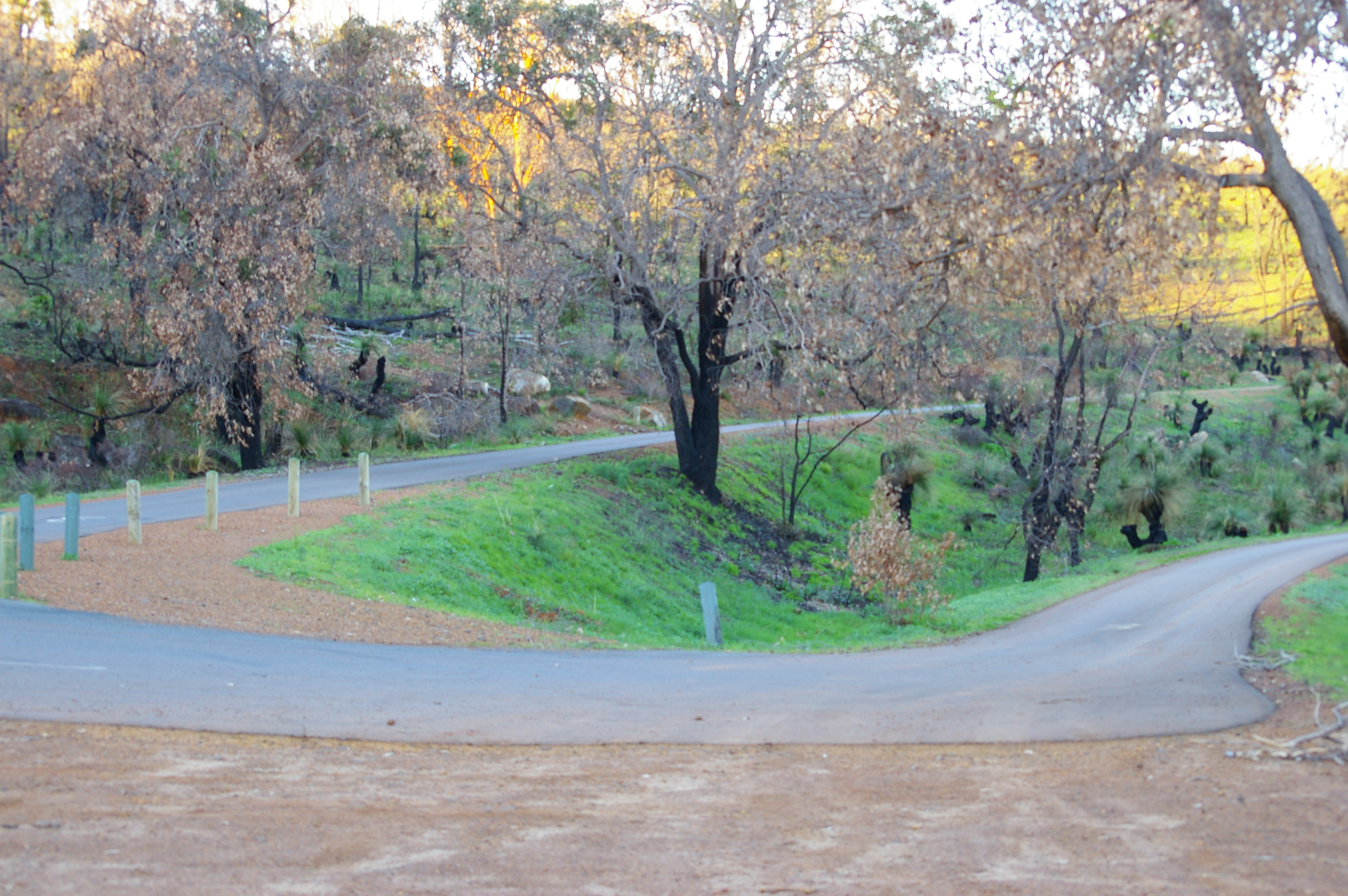
Statham's Quarry, site of Number 2 points, 2007

Gradient profile map

The Kalamunda Zig Zag was completed in July 1891, as part of the Upper Darling Range railway line in Western Australia, built by the Canning Jarrah Timber Company from a junction with the Midland line at Midland Junction to Canning Mills, to transport railway sleepers for Perth's growing railway system. To overcome the steep gradient up the Darling Scarp, a zig zag was built between Ridge Hill and Gooseberry Hill stations, being cheaper to build than a continuous, steeply-graded line.

On 1 July 1903, the line was taken over by the Western Australian Government Railways. The Kalamunda Zig Zag was closed on 22 July 1949 along with the rest of the line. In 1952, the track was removed and most of the Kalamunda Zig Zag was converted into a narrow bitumen road.

Part of the road is now a tourist route called Zig Zag Scenic Drive, with the zig zag section that descends the Darling Scarp being one-way in the direction of descent, with a speed limit of 40 km/h (25 mph) and, as of May 2022, closed to motor vehicles between the hours of 8:30 pm and 11 am. This section of road had been completely closed to motor vehicles by the City of Kalamunda in May 2020 due to reports of anti-social behaviour at night including hooning, drug use and cruelty to wildlife. After more than 12 months of closure, the road reopened in July 2021 for a 12-month trial, with motor vehicle access limited to between 11 am and 8:30 pm. In May 2022, City of Kalamunda councillors voted to keep the road open permanently, with the night and early morning motor vehicle curfew to continue, despite concerns about the ongoing cost of doing so.

== Sections ==
The sections of the railway that made up the zig zag were:

- Ridge Hill (lower section of Kalamunda Zig Zag)
- Number 1 Points
- Number 2 Points Statham's Quarry known also as Perth City Council Siding from 1920
- Number 3 Points
- Number 4 Points (upper section of Kalamunda Zig Zag)

The gradient was as steep as 1 in 27 with an average of 1 in 38.

== Events ==
Every year the City of Kalamunda holds a "Zig Zag Walk" event, in which the zig zag section is closed to all but pedestrians, providing people with the opportunity to admire the views and see the area's wildflowers; Zig Zag Scenic Drive is a part of the Darling Range Regional Park. The Zig Zag Walk occurs around early October every year. On the last Sunday of October each year, there is a community arts festival called the "Zig Zag Festival" held in Stirk Park, Kalamunda.

The Zig Zag is also used as a stage in the Targa West Rally. The road is closed to all traffic and the stage is run in reverse direction, from the bottom to the top.
