= Kalamunda, Western Australia =

Kalamunda
- Suburb
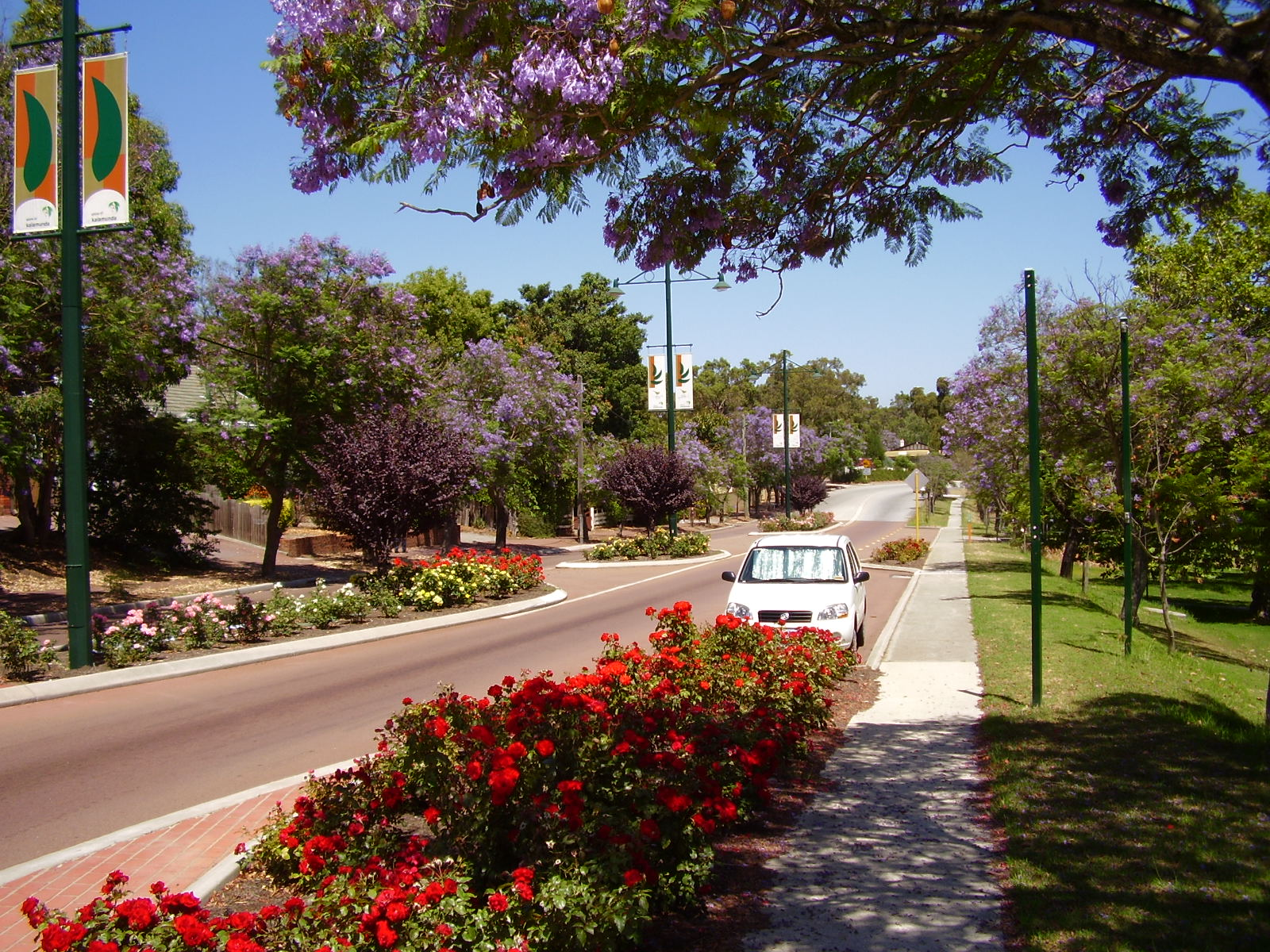
- Kalamunda Road, Kalamunda
- Interactive map of Kalamunda
- Coordinates: 31.974°S 116.058°E
- Country: Australia
- State: Western Australia
- City: Perth
- LGA: City of Kalamunda
- Location: 25 km (16 mi) from Perth
- Established: 1901

Government
  - State electorate: Kalamunda
  - Federal division: Bullwinkel

Area
  - Total: 10.6 km^{2} (4.1 sq mi)

Population
  - Total: 7,163 (SAL 2021)
- Postcode: 6076
Suburbs around Kalamunda
Maida Vale	Gooseberry Hill	Piesse Brook
Forrestfield	Kalamunda	Piesse Brook
Forrestfield	Lesmurdie	Walliston

Kalamunda (Nyungar: Karlamarda) is an eastern suburb of Perth, Western Australia, located in the Darling Scarp at the eastern limits of the Perth metropolitan area.

== History ==
Indigenous Noongar people were the first inhabitants of the area. The first permanent European settlers were the family of Frederick and Elizabeth Stirk, who arrived in 1881 and established a property called Headingly Hill at what is now Stirk Park; their house, Stirk Cottage, is now a museum. More settlers moved in during the 1890s, aided by the advent of the Kalamunda Zig Zag railway. At this time the Kalamunda area was known as Gooseberry Hill. The name Kalamunda was declared on 13 December 1901 after a request from thirty-two residents to form a townsite. They requested the name Calamunnda, derived from two words in the indigenous Noongar language, as recorded in a book by Bishop Rosendo Salvado: cala meaning "fire", "home", "district", or "settlement" and mun-da meaning "forest" or "bush". Surveyor-General Harry Johnston respelt the name as Kalamunnda and it was changed to Kalamunda by 1901. The local government area's unofficial motto is "A home in the forest".

== Environment ==
=== Geography ===
At 300 metres (980 ft) above sea level, Kalamunda and the surrounding areas experience colder night temperatures than the bulk of the Perth Metropolitan area to the west. Deep clay soils in the valleys in this area provide ideal growing conditions for stone fruits, apples and pears, wine production and for a small commercial rose growing industry.

The suburb of Gooseberry Hill is located to the north of Kalamunda where the terrain drops away sharply to the Helena Valley effectively isolating Kalamunda from other Darling Scarp population centres to the north. To the south and east the urban area transitions into the semi-rural and orchard growing areas of Bickley, Carmel and Pickering Brook, which in turn give way to extensive jarrah and marri forests.

Located nearby is the Kalamunda National Park and the northern terminus of the Bibbulmun Track, a 963-kilometre (598 mi) recreational walking trail.

=== Important Bird Area ===
The suburb lies within the Mundaring-Kalamunda Important Bird Area, so identified by BirdLife International because of its importance as a non-breeding season roost site and foraging base for Long-billed Black Cockatoos.

=== Climate ===
Kalamunda has a Mediterranean climate with hot dry summers and cool wet winters. Due to the suburb's high elevation of around 250–300 metres (820–980 ft) above mean sea level and location on the Darling Scarp, it is a few degrees cooler in winter than Perth; however, this difference is less pronounced in summer as Kalamunda is less affected than Perth by the regular afternoon sea breeze, the Fremantle Doctor, due to its inland location. Kalamunda is far wetter than the city with over 1,000 millimetres (39 in) of annual rainfall, due to its location in the Darling Scarp.

Climate data for Kalamunda
Month	Jan	Feb	Mar	Apr	May	Jun	Jul	Aug	Sep	Oct	Nov	Dec	Year
Mean daily maximum °C (°F)	30.4 (86.7)	30.3 (86.5)	27.7 (81.9)	23.8 (74.8)	19.0 (66.2)	16.4 (61.5)	15.4 (59.7)	16.3 (61.3)	18.3 (64.9)	20.6 (69.1)	24.5 (76.1)	28.0 (82.4)	22.6 (72.7)
Mean daily minimum °C (°F)	16.2 (61.2)	16.3 (61.3)	15.3 (59.5)	13.4 (56.1)	10.8 (51.4)	9.1 (48.4)	8.0 (46.4)	8.1 (46.6)	9.2 (48.6)	10.1 (50.2)	12.5 (54.5)	14.6 (58.3)	12.0 (53.6)
Average precipitation mm (inches)	11.9 (0.47)	17.4 (0.69)	22.7 (0.89)	55.7 (2.19)	144.3 (5.68)	216.2 (8.51)	213.8 (8.42)	165.9 (6.53)	102.1 (4.02)	70.5 (2.78)	28.6 (1.13)	19.6 (0.77)	1,063.3 (41.86)
Average precipitation days	2.5	2.6	3.9	7.0	13.3	16.6	18.5	16.5	13.1	10.9	6.2	3.7	114.8

== Transport ==
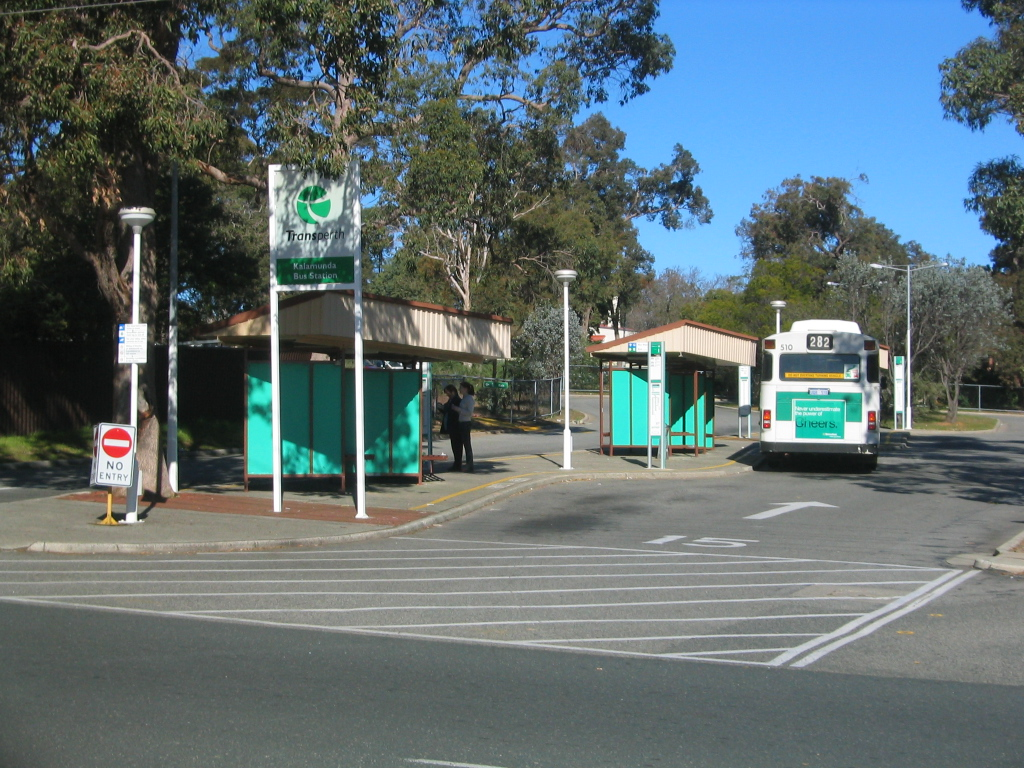
Kalamunda bus station

Kalamunda Road serves as a major access road for Perth Airport, and provides the foothills suburbs with access to the Perth central business district. The suburb is serviced by the Kalamunda bus station, which provides bus services across the Perth metropolitan area.

Kalamunda was once part of a thriving logging region, with Kalamunda railway station the largest station on the Upper Darling Range railway. The area has a number of features as a result of this railway including a museum at the site of the original station. Typical rail side road structures with a rail reserve between and the Zig Zag road on the old section where the railway climbed the Darling Scarp. It is at Gooseberry Hill that the railway used to descend from the hills to Midland Junction, dropping 300 metres (980 ft) in a series of five zig-zag shunts. The railway line has been replaced by a single lane, one-way scenic drive that follows the old track.

=== Bus ===
==== Bus stations ====
- Kalamunda Bus Station

==== Bus routes ====
- 272 Kalamunda Bus Station to Kalamunda Community Centre – serves Mead Street and Crescent Road
- 273 Kalamunda Bus Station to Kalamunda Bus Station – Circular Route, serves Canning Road, Recreation Road, Peet Road and Cotherstone Road
- 274 Kalamunda Bus Station to Gooseberry Hill – serves Mead Street and Railway Road
- 275 Walliston to High Wycombe Station – serves Canning Road, Railway Road, Mead Street, Kalamunda Bus Station and Kalamunda Road
- 276 Kalamunda Bus Station to High Wycombe Station – serves Mead Street and Railway Road
- 279 Kalamunda Bus Station to Maddington Central – serves Canning Road and Lesmurdie Road
- 282 Kalamunda Bus Station to Oats Street Station – serves Canning Road
- 283 Kalamunda Bus Station to Oats Street Station – serves Canning Road and Lesmurdie Road
- 307 Kalamunda Bus Station to Midland Station – serves Mead Street and Railway Road

== Facilities ==
Kalamunda has extensive areas with orchards, primarily involved in apple and stone fruit production. The region largely serves as a dormitory suburb for Perth workers. It has a modest retail, government and education sector, and a small industrial base. While the suburb's retail centre is the largest in the Darling Scarp it primarily services Kalamunda and the contiguous urbanised areas of Lesmurdie and Walliston.

Kalamunda and the surrounding areas have an arts and crafts tradition, and are home to three major Perth residential colleges. Conservation groups are active within the community, and efforts have been made (largely successfully) to maintain native vegetation adjacent to the urban areas, and to some extent with the urban area.

Kalamunda is home to the television towers of all free-to-air Perth Television stations, and the approach control radar for Perth Airport.

== Demographics ==
In the 2016 census, Kalamunda had a population of 6,970; 48.3% male and 51.7% female. The median age of Kalamunda residents was 47, and median weekly personal income was $676. Aboriginal and/or Torres Strait Islander people made up 0.7% of the population.

The most popular religious affiliations in descending order in the 2016 census were No Religion 33.1%, Catholic 22.4%, Anglican 18.8%, Not Stated 9.0% and Christian, nfd 3.8%. Christianity was the largest religious group reported overall (61.4%) (this figure excludes not stated responses).

The population profile of Kalamunda is slightly in advance of the Perth Metropolitan area with a media age of 47, compared with Perth Metropolitan areas median age of 36, and it is likely that in time it will develop a large retirement population. The population of Kalamunda and the surrounding areas have a diverse ethnicity. Notably however, there are many Italian families who became involved in the orchard industry in the post-Second World War migration period.

Despite the steady encroach of the urban sprawl in recent times which has eroded the sense of a 'regional centre', Kalamunda remains a quiet suburb amongst the jarrah forests on the Darling Scarp.

Short stay accommodation in a forest setting close to Perth is a growth area, and Kalamunda is increasingly offering ecotourism experiences for local and overseas visitors.

== Gallery ==
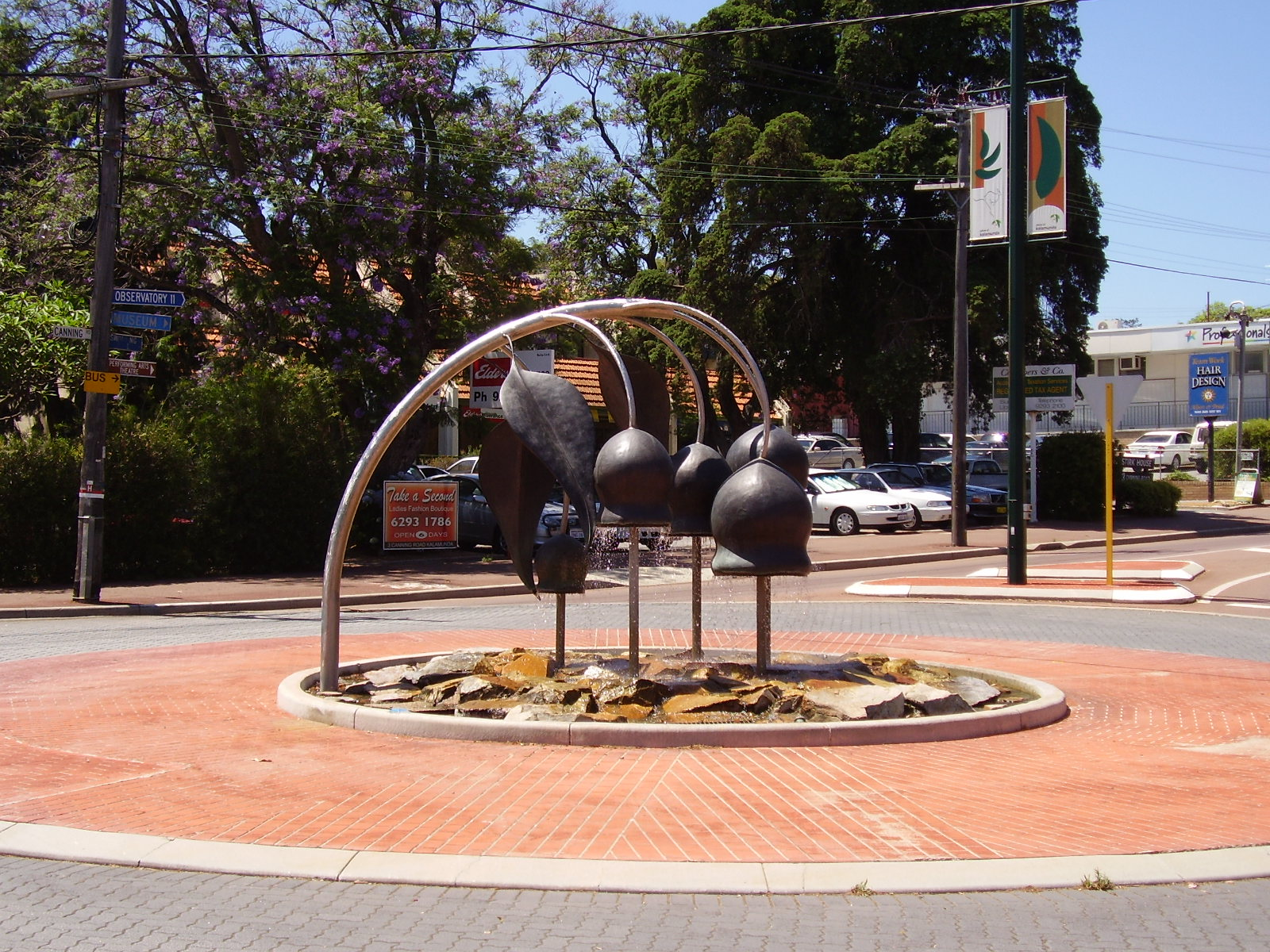
The gum nut fountain

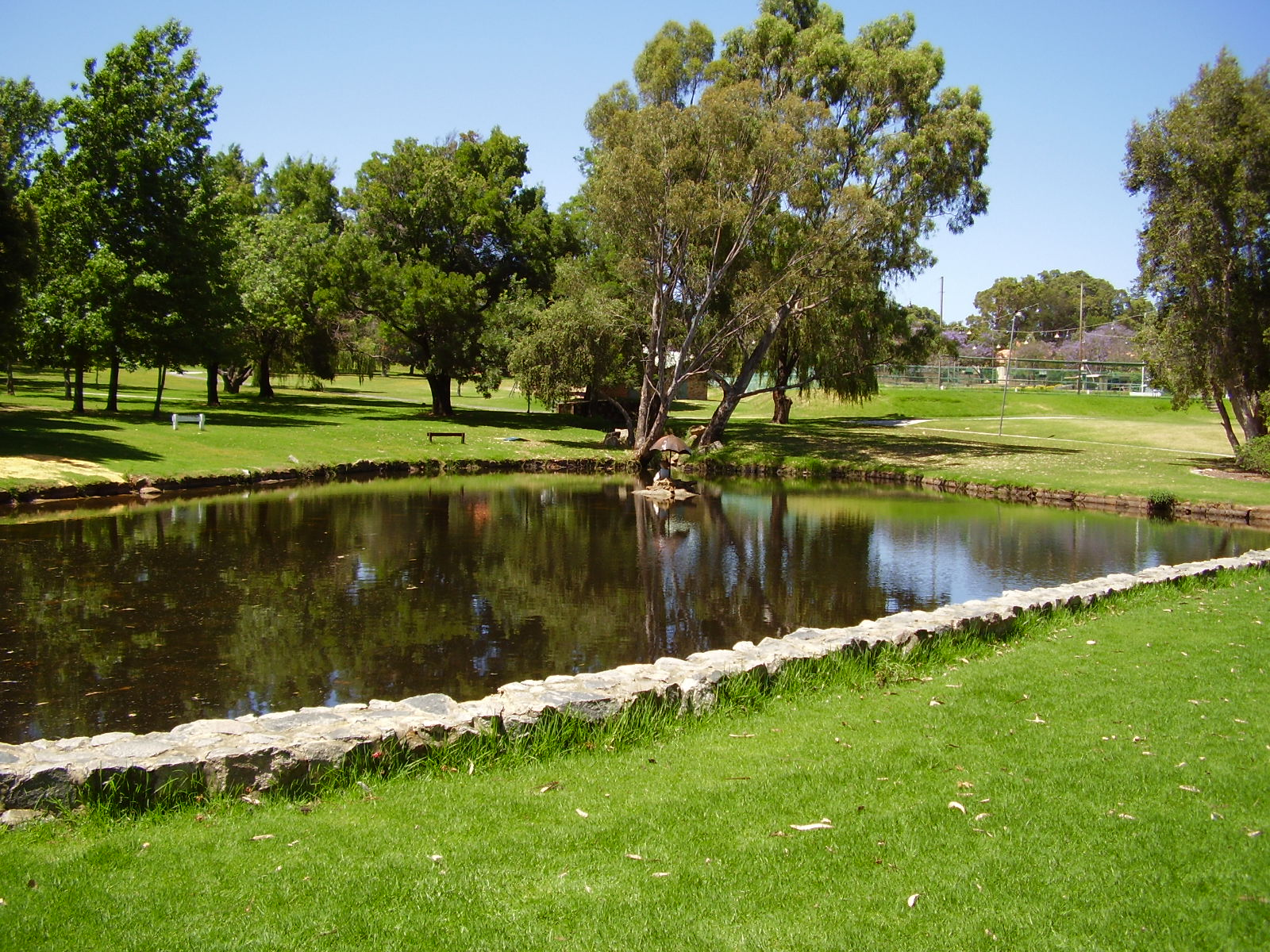
Stirk Park

== See also ==
- City of Kalamunda
