= Arthur James Hillman =

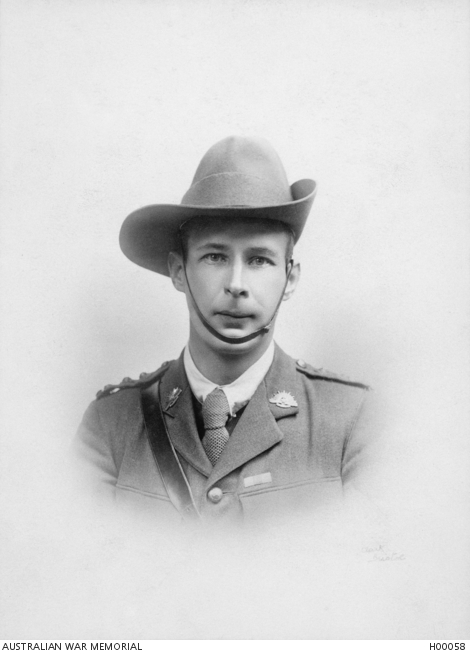
- Born: 19 July 1884; Perth
- Died: 27 April 1922 (aged 37); Guildford, Western Australia
- Occupation: Civil engineer

Arthur James Hillman (19 July 1884 – 27 April 1922) was an Australian civil engineer who worked for the Public Works Department of Western Australia. He served with the Australian Army during World War I and spent most of his service tunnelling under the front line trenches in France. When he returned to Perth after the war, he resumed working for the Public Works Department. Hillman worked on water supply projects including being executive engineer on the Lower Bickley Brook Reservoir. Hillman died in 1922 as a result of an ongoing medical issue, which was caused by being gassed during WWI.

== Family ==
Arthur Hillman was the son of banker and volunteer soldier Major Alfred James Hillman (1841–1884) and his wife Elizabeth Deborah Hillman née Brockman.

Hillman was the grandson of the pioneering surveyor, Alfred Hillman (1807–1883), whose work included exploring and surveying Albany Highway. Alfred had come to the Swan River Colony in 1831 as a Colonial Draftsman.

== Early years ==
Hillman attended Perth Boys School and later Melbourne Church of England Grammar School. In 1896, he was awarded the Witherby Scholarship at Melbourne Grammar. He became the dux of Melbourne Grammar after he enrolled in 1901.

Hillman commenced work with the Public Works Department as an engineering cadet in 1902, and received training at the Fremantle Technical College followed by Melbourne University. On 24 January 1911, he married Helene Elizabeth Merry at All Saints Church in Belmont, New South Wales.

In 1913, Hillman worked as a resident engineer at Geraldton Water Supply. In 1914, he was admitted into the Institution of Civil Engineers as an associate member.

== World War I ==
In 1915, when applying for a commission, Hillman was employed as an assistant engineer in the Perth District Water Supply Department. In May 1916, he was appointed as Captain of His Majesty's Australian Transport (HMAT) A69 Warilda with 1,118 members of the 4th, 5th and 6th Tunneling Companies on board. They began their journey from Fremantle to Plymouth, England on 1 June 1916.

The group arrived in Plymouth on 8 July 1916, where the men underwent further training. Hillman, along with some of the men on board Warilda, travelled to France in August 1916. Hillman was taken on as strength of the 3rd Australian Tunnelling Company, Supernumerary to Establishment, on 25 September 1916. He was then taken on as strength of the 3rd Tunnelling Company on 1 June 1917. During their time on the Western Front, the 3rd Tunnelling Company was allocated to the British First Army. They were employed by the British in the Wytschaete, Fromelles, Laventie, Fauquissart, Lens, Loos, Arras, Givenchy, Vermelles and Le Tilleloy sectors.

Hillman was marched out of the 3rd Tunneling Company on 6 February 1919, for repatriation to Australia. However, on 13 February 1919, he was given command of the 2nd Tunneling Company. Two weeks later, on 21 February 1919, he marched out to England for demobilization, returning to Australia on Sardinia, which departed from London on 19 April 1919.

On 3 June 1918, the award of the Military Cross to Captain Arthur James Hillman for gallant and distinguished service in the field was published in the London Gazette.

== Post-war ==
Hillman was admitted to the convocation of the University of Western Australia by the Senate on 20 October 1919.

He was a strong supporter of the Institution of Engineers, being elected to the Perth Division Committee in 1921, and was a founding associate member of the Western Australia Institution of Engineers.

In 1921, he was the executive engineer for the construction of the Lower Bickley Brook Reservoir. One year later, he started working as the assistant engineer in the Mount Hawthorn Reservoir.

Hillman died at Guildford on 27 April 1922, after a short illness that was associated with being gassed when in service. At the time of his death, he was working as the assistant engineer in the Metropolitan Water Supply, the vice president of the Perth Division in the Institution of Engineers, the second in command in the 13th Double Field Company of Engineers, and a councillor at the Guildford Municipal Council. He was survived by his wife and six young children including Robert Hillman, who later became the Director of Engineering at the Public Works Department.
