= Electoral district of Kalamunda =

State electoral district of Western Australia

Kalamunda Western Australia—Legislative Assembly
- Interactive map of electoral district boundaries from the 2025 state election
- State: Western Australia
- Dates current: 1974–1989; 2008–present
- MP: Adam Hort
- Party: Liberal
- Namesake: Kalamunda
- Electors: 32,864 (2025)
- Area: 893 km^{2} (344.8 sq mi)
- Demographic: Metropolitan
Electorates around Kalamunda:
Swan Hills	Swan Hills	Central Wheatbelt
Midland; Forrestfield	Kalamunda	Central Wheatbelt
Thornlie	Darling Range	Central Wheatbelt

Kalamunda is an electoral district of the Legislative Assembly in the Australian state of Western Australia.

Politically, the district is a marginal one. Based on the results of the 2005 state election, the seat was created with a Liberal Party majority of 50.2% to 49.8% versus the Labor Party.

== History ==
Kalamunda was first created for the 1974 election and abolished ahead of the 1989 election. Despite the name, the seat was actually centred on Greenmount in the eastern Hills region, and Kalamunda itself was split between the Kalamunda seat and the neighbouring Darling Range. Despite being within the metropolitan area of Perth, it was regarded as non-metropolitan, and was assigned to the West Province in the Legislative Council. As a result, it had about half the enrolment of the neighbouring seat of Helena. Under the Acts Amendment (Electoral Reform) Act 1987, which reclassified "metropolitan" in the Electoral Act 1907 to include all land within the Metropolitan Region Scheme boundaries and at the same time increased overall metropolitan representation, Kalamunda was merged with Darling Range, and its member, Ian Thompson, won Darling Range on the new boundaries in 1989.

A new seat named Kalamunda was created for the 2008 state election when the number of metropolitan seats was increased in accordance with the new one vote one value legislation. The new district was drawn largely from Darling Range, but also from parts of Kenwick, Midland and Swan Hills.

== Geography ==
Kalamunda is based in the eastern suburbs of Perth. Its boundaries cover two distinct areas. The northern area, centred on Kalamunda, includes Gooseberry Hill, Lesmurdie, Paulls Valley, Piesse Brook and Walliston along with tiny sections of Maida Vale and Forrestfield and all populated portions of Bickley and Carmel. A narrow section extends north to include all of Darlington. In the south, it includes much of Canning Mills, Martin and Orange Grove and the major residential portion of Maddington, excluding its commercial and industrial areas.

The earlier incarnation included the districts of Boya, Darlington, Glen Forrest, Gooseberry Hill, Greenmount, Piesse Brook and Paulls Valley, as well as northern sections of the suburb of Kalamunda including its town centre.

== Members for Kalamunda ==
Kalamunda (1974–1989)
Member	Party	Term
Ian Thompson	Liberal	1974–1989
Kalamunda (2008–present)
John Day	Liberal	2008–2017
Matthew Hughes	Labor	2017–2025
Adam Hort	Liberal	2025–present

== Election results ==
2025 Western Australian state election: Kalamunda
Party	Candidate	Votes	%	±%
Labor	Karen Beale	9,120	32.2	−21.9
Liberal	Adam Hort	8,874	31.4	+2.2
Greens	Janelle Sewell	4,197	14.8	+6.5
National	Lisa Logan	2,588	9.1	+9.1
One Nation	Robert Critchley	1,375	4.9	+3.6
Legalise Cannabis	Penelope Young	991	3.5	+3.5
Christians	Shemma Timney	715	2.5	−0.2
Shooters, Fishers, Farmers	George Taylor	438	1.5	+1.5
Total formal votes		28,298	96.3	−0.3
Informal votes		1,093	3.7	+0.3
Turnout		29,391	89.4	−1.3
Two-party-preferred result
Liberal	Adam Hort	14,178	50.1	+14.7
Labor	Karen Beale	14,096	49.9	−14.7
Liberal gain from Labor		Swing	+14.7	
