= Pickering Brook, Western Australia =

Pickering Brook
- Suburb
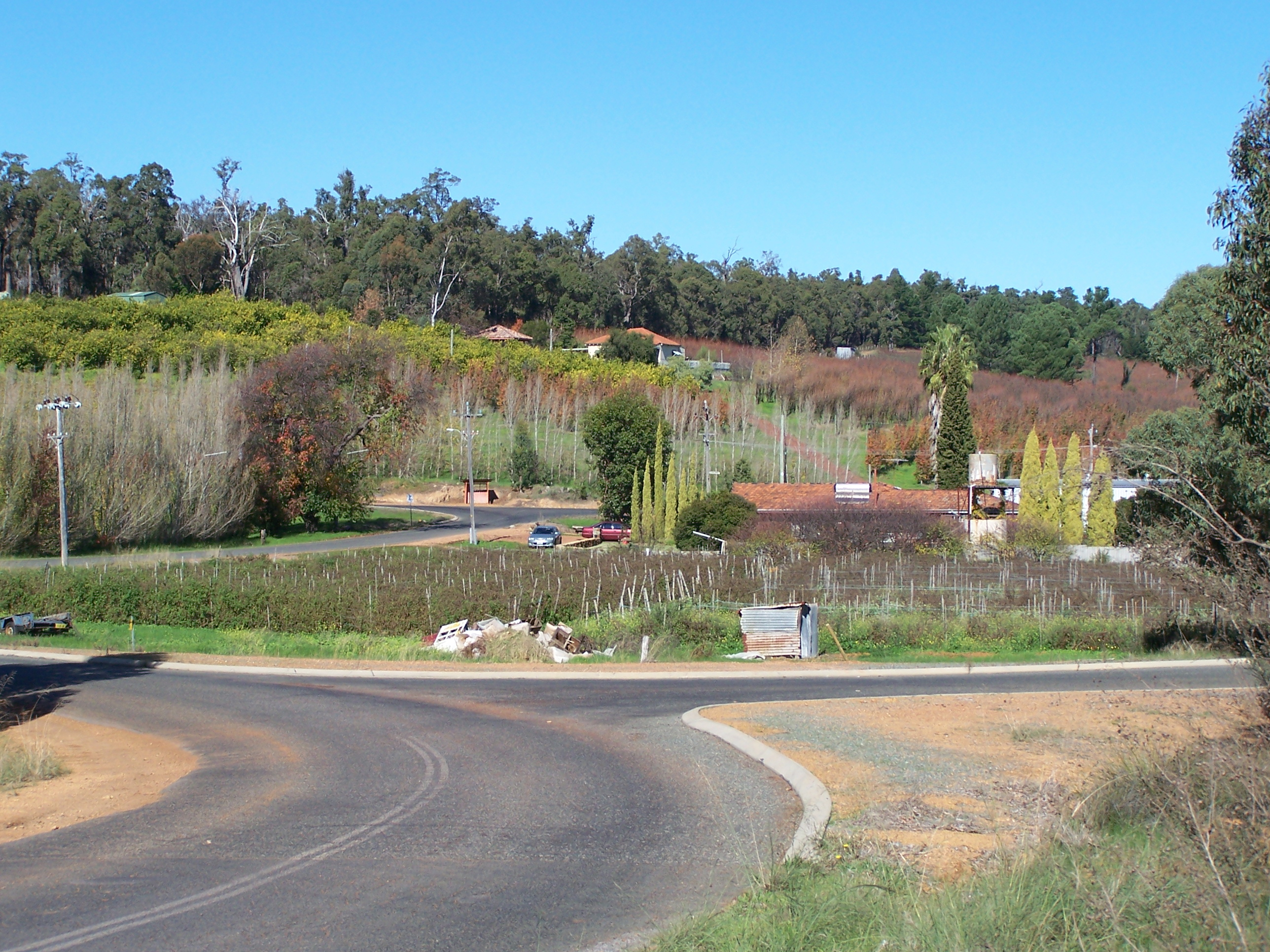
- Autumn colours of orchards in Pickering Brook
- Interactive map of Pickering Brook
- Coordinates: 32.037°S 116.122°E
- Country: Australia
- State: Western Australia
- City: Perth
- LGA: City of Kalamunda

Government
  - State electorate: Kalamunda
  - Federal division: Bullwinkel

Population
  - Total: 579 (SAL 2021)
- Postcode: 6076
Suburbs around Pickering Brook
Carmel	Bickley	Reservoir
Canning Mills	Pickering Brook
Karragullen	Karragullen

Pickering Brook is a suburb of Perth, Western Australia, located within the City of Kalamunda.

Prior to 1949 it was a stopping place on the Upper Darling Range railway.

It was named after nearby Pickering Brook. The brook is named after an early settler, Captain Edward Picking whose name was sometimes recorded as Pickering. The suburb of Pickering Brook was officially created on 12 January 1973. Part of it was formerly known as Carilla.

Like nearby areas such as Karragullen, Pickering Brook is primarily made up of various family-run orchards.

The suburb was seriously under threat in December 2001 from a bushfire.

In June 2008, the previously named Pickering Brook National Park associated with the locality was named Korung National Park.

== See also ==
- Darling Scarp
