= Gooseberry Hill National Park =

National park in Perth, Western Australia

- IUCN category II (national park)
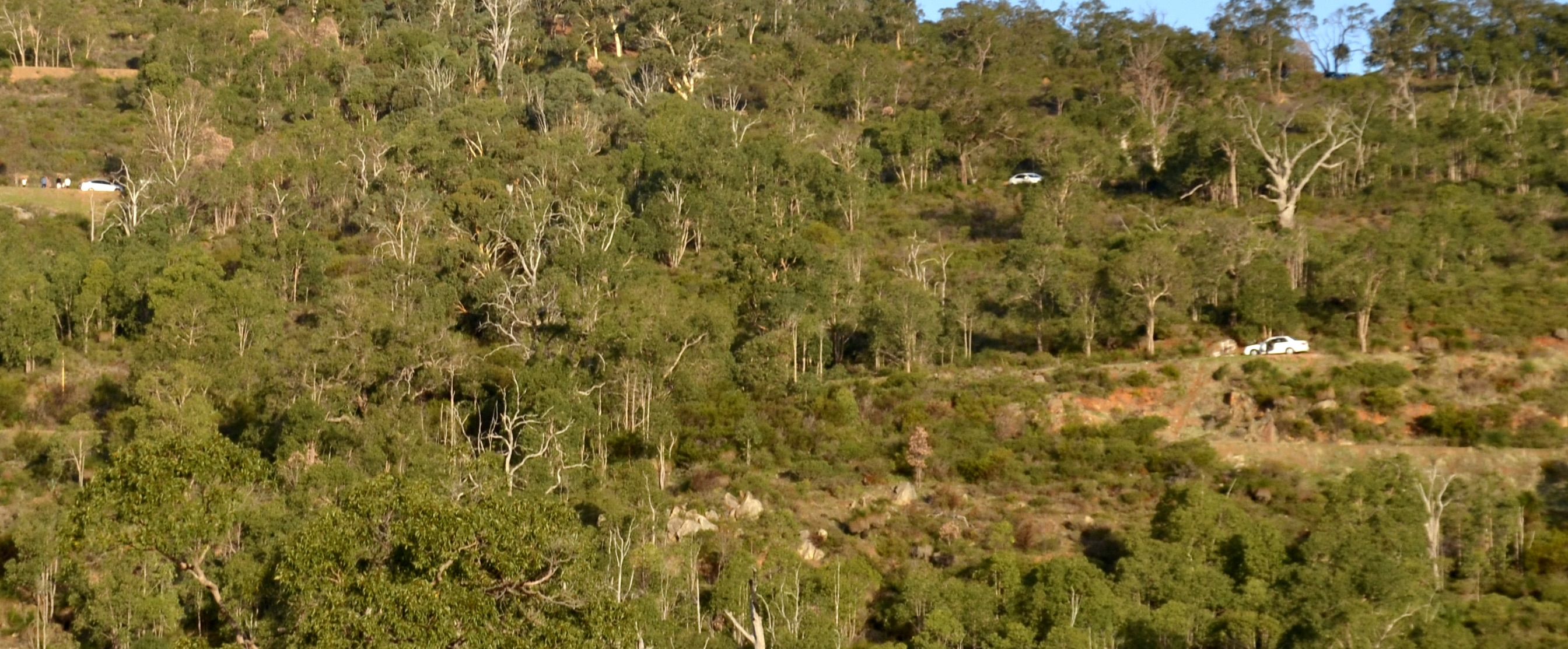
- Zig Zag Scenic Drive detail from Ridge Hill Road

- Location within Western Australia
- Location: Western Australia
- Nearest city: Perth
- Coordinates: 31°56′29″S 116°02′47″E
- Area: 33 ha (82 acres)
- Established: 1970
- Governing body: Department of Environment and Conservation
- Website: Official website

Gooseberry Hill National Park is a national park in Western Australia, in the locality of Gooseberry Hill, 21 kilometres (13 mi) east of the Perth central business district. It is at the southern side of the mouth of the Helena Valley on the Darling Scarp. Statham's Quarry is located within the park boundary.

The park was named after a hill in Yorkshire by the early settlers. A walking track and the single lane bitumen zig zag drive are both found within the park. The zig zag drive follows the old zig zag railway track which winds up the steep terrain, offering excellent views of the Swan Coastal Plain below.

No entry fees apply to enter the park but no facilities are available to visitors.

== See also ==
- Protected areas of Western Australia
