= City of Kalamunda =

Coordinates: 31°58′26″S 116°03′29″E

- Local government area
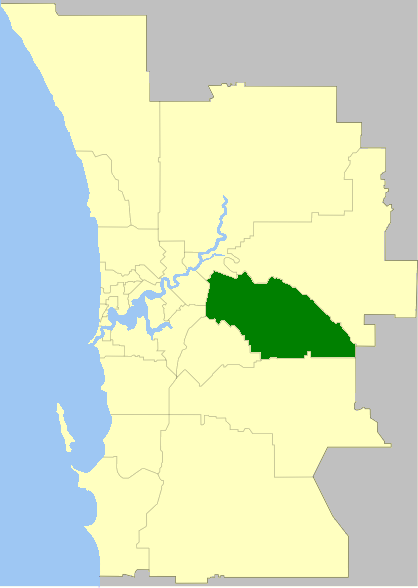
- The City of Kalamunda within the Perth Metropolitan Area

- Interactive map of City of Kalamunda
- Country: Australia
- State: Western Australia
- Region: Eastern Metropolitan Perth Darling Scarp
- Established: 1897
- Council seat: Kalamunda

Government
  - Mayor: Margaret Thomas
  - State electorate: Darling Range, Forrestfield, Kalamunda
  - Federal division: Swan, Bullwinkel

Area
  - Total: 324.2 km^{2} (125.2 sq mi)

Population
  - Total: 58,762 (LGA 2021)
- Website: City of Kalamunda
LGAs around City of Kalamunda
Swan	Mundaring	Mundaring
Belmont; Canning	City of Kalamunda	York
Gosnells	Armadale	Beverley

The City of Kalamunda is a local government area in the eastern metropolitan region of the Western Australian capital city of Perth about 25 kilometres (16 mi) east of Perth's central business district. The area covers 324 square kilometres (125 sq mi), much of which is state forest rising into the Darling Scarp to the east. As of 2021, the city had a population of 58,762.

== History ==
The Darling Range Road District was gazetted on 30 April 1897. On 1 July 1961, it became the Shire of Kalamunda after the enactment of the Local Government Act 1960, which reformed all remaining road districts into shires. The Shire of Kalamunda commenced community consultation on whether to become a city in 2015, and was renamed the City of Kalamunda on 1 July 2017.

== Wards ==
The city is divided into four wards.

- North Ward (three councillors)
- North West Ward (three councillors)
- South East Ward (three councillors)
- South West Ward (three councillors)

== Suburbs ==
The suburbs of the City of Kalamunda with population and size figures based on the most recent Australian census:

Suburb	Population	Area	Map
Bickley	713 (SAL 2021)	9.9 km^{2} (3.8 sq mi)	
Canning Mills	26 (SAL 2016)	33.5 km^{2} (12.9 sq mi)	
Carmel	754 (SAL 2021)	11.6 km^{2} (4.5 sq mi)	
Forrestfield	13,181 (SAL 2021)	17.4 km^{2} (6.7 sq mi)	
Gooseberry Hill	3,323 (SAL 2021)	8.9 km^{2} (3.4 sq mi)	
Hacketts Gully	55 (SAL 2021)	12.2 km^{2} (4.7 sq mi)	
High Wycombe	12,198 (SAL 2021)	10.5 km^{2} (4.1 sq mi)	
Kalamunda	7,163 (SAL 2021)	10.6 km^{2} (4.1 sq mi)	
Lesmurdie	8,413 (SAL 2021)	13.6 km^{2} (5.3 sq mi)	
Maida Vale	4,499 (SAL 2016)	8.4 km^{2} (3.2 sq mi)	
Paulls Valley	83 (SAL 2021)	20.3 km^{2} (7.8 sq mi)	
Perth Airport *	25 (SAL 2021)	19.2 km^{2} (7.4 sq mi)	
Pickering Brook	579 (SAL 2021)	104.6 km^{2} (40.4 sq mi)	
Piesse Brook	214 (SAL 2021)	10.2 km^{2} (3.9 sq mi)	
Reservoir	0 (SAL 2021)	39.6 km^{2} (15.3 sq mi)	
Walliston	1,016 (SAL 2021)	3.8 km^{2} (1.5 sq mi)	
Wattle Grove	6,547 (SAL 2021)	8 km^{2} (3.1 sq mi)	

( * indicates suburb partially located within City)

== Population ==
Historical population

Year	Pop.	±% p.a.
1911	1,038	—
1921	1,751	+5.37%
1933	2,814	+4.03%
1947	4,113	+2.75%
1954	6,354	+6.41%
1961	7,524	+2.44%
1966	9,785	+5.40%
1971	18,362	+13.42%
1976	26,448	+7.57%

Year	Pop.	±% p.a.
1981	35,475	+6.05%
1986	40,547	+2.71%
1991	45,733	+2.44%
1996	46,115	+0.17%
2001	46,059	−0.02%
2006	49,534	+1.47%
2011	53,567	+1.58%
2016	57,449	+1.41%
2021	58,762	+0.45%

== Heritage listed places ==
As of 2024, 259 places are heritage-listed in the City of Kalamunda, of which 17 are on the State Register of Heritage Places, among them Perth Observatory and the Statham's Quarry.
