= Victoria Dam (Western Australia) =

Dam in Perth, Western Australia

The Victoria Dam is a water supply dam providing water for the city of Perth, Western Australia. It is situated on the Darling Scarp near Lesmurdie, and crosses Munday Brook. Two dams have stood at the present site; the older dam was the first permanent water supply for the colony and also the first dam in Western Australia. It stood for almost 100 years before being replaced with the current dam.

== Old Victoria Dam (1891–1990) ==
Old Victoria Dam
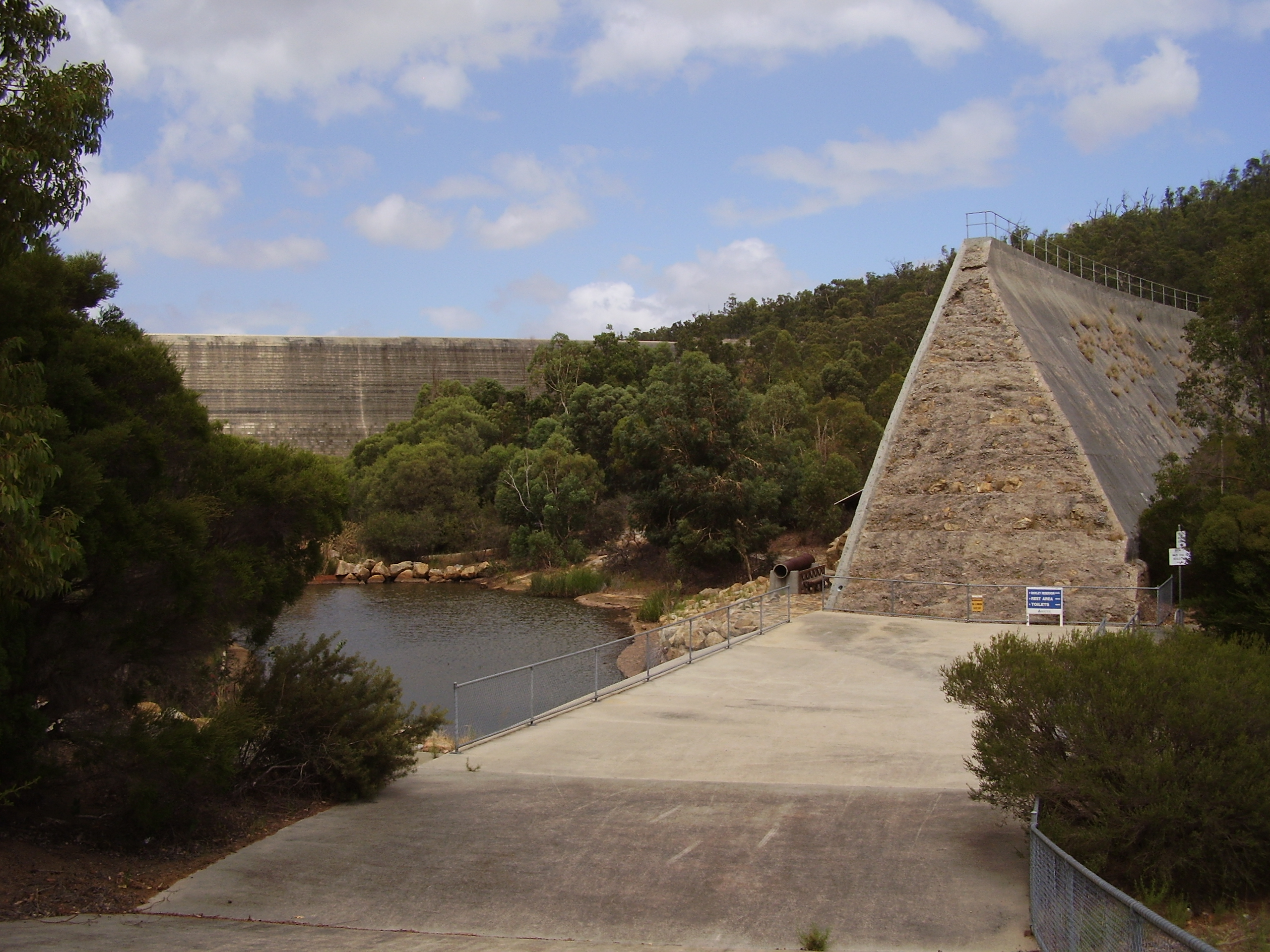
- The Old and New Victoria Dams
- Interactive map of Old Victoria Dam
- Official name: Victoria Dam
- Location: Perth, Western Australia
- Coordinates: 32°02′25″S 116°04′00″E
- Opening date: 1 October 1891

Dam and spillways
- Type of dam: Arch-gravity dam
- Impounds: Munday Brook
- Height: 23 m (75 ft)
- Length: 220 m (722 ft)

Reservoir
- Creates: Victoria Reservoir
- Total capacity: 600 ML (21,000,000 ft^{3})
- Catchment area: 37.2 km^{2} (14.4 mi^{2})
- Surface area: 0.15 km^{2} (0.06 mi^{2})

Prior to the constriction of the dam, residents of Perth sourced their drinking water from wells, natural bodies of water and rainwater tanks. With the growth in the population of Perth and Fremantle, concerns about water quality, pollution and adequate sewage disposal became widespread. Decades of proposals for sewage disposal and water supply systems followed, coupled with disagreement between the Town Councils and the Colony Government about responsibility for this area. An extensive water supply scheme was eventually compiled by the civil engineers Henry John Saunders and James Barratt in June 1887.

The scheme designed by Saunders and Barratt contained full designs, site surveys and runoff estimates, despite no guarantee of approval or financial incentive. The plan included reticulation for both Perth and Fremantle. In July and August 1887, a Legislative Council Select Committee appointed to examine the proposal passed the issue back to local government. Fremantle refused to participate in the water supply scheme, so following the departure from the Civil Engineering partnership of Barratt, Saunders removed Fremantle from the plan.

The Colony Government passed enabling legislation, and some privately owned land covering the reservoir was resumed.

The site of the proposed reservoir is some 17 miles from Perth, and lies in a hollow of the hills, apparently intended by Nature for some such purpose, surrounded by the jarrah forest. At the lower end the hills approach comparatively close together, where it is proposed to construct the embankment.

— The West Australian, 3 December 1889

Construction was completed in 1891. The scheme, which included pipelines to Kings Park and a reservoir there on Mount Eliza, was constructed and operated by the private City of Perth Waterworks Company. The dam became the first permanent water source for Perth.

The concrete dam wall was built using approximately 1,260 tonnes (1,240 long tons; 1,390 short tons) of cement imported from England. The dam wall was a concrete gravity-arch structure, designed in the plan of a large-radius arch. The volume of the concrete in the finished wall was 16,900 cubic metres (0.60 million cubic feet).

At the time, the catchment area for the reservoir was used for cattle and sheep grazing and also housed several timber mill settlements. As soon after completion as 1892, concerns were raised that this new water source was getting polluted by raw sewage from the timber mills as well as excrement from the livestock.

Several cases of typhoid fever occurred at a timber mill in the catchment in 1892, at a time when typhoid fever became increasingly prevalent in Perth. Between 1895 and 1900, there were 4047 cases and 425 deaths from typhoid fever in Perth, and the water supply was suspected to be contaminated. In response to this, in 1896 the Colonial Government purchased the scheme, including the dam, pipelines and Mount Eliza reservoir. In 1897, a sample of the water from the reservoir was found to contain the bacteria causing typhoid fever, and strict by-laws were implemented to prosecute any cases of pollution of the water catchment. Also, a channel was cut to divert the Munday Brook water (polluted by the timber mills) away from the reservoir.

The dam as originally constructed featured two small spillways. In 1939, one of these was closed and the other expanded.

Water leaking through the dam wall leached lime from the concrete, weakening the structure. Efforts to reduce the leaking occurred in 1912, and in 1966 the upstream side of the dam wall was covered with reinforced concrete to reduce further leaking. However, a 1988 review of the dam's design concluded that it lacked sufficient safety margins in the event of floods or earthquakes, and its concrete had degraded to such a level that it could not be repaired, and needed replacement.

== New Victoria Dam (1991–present) ==
New Victoria Dam
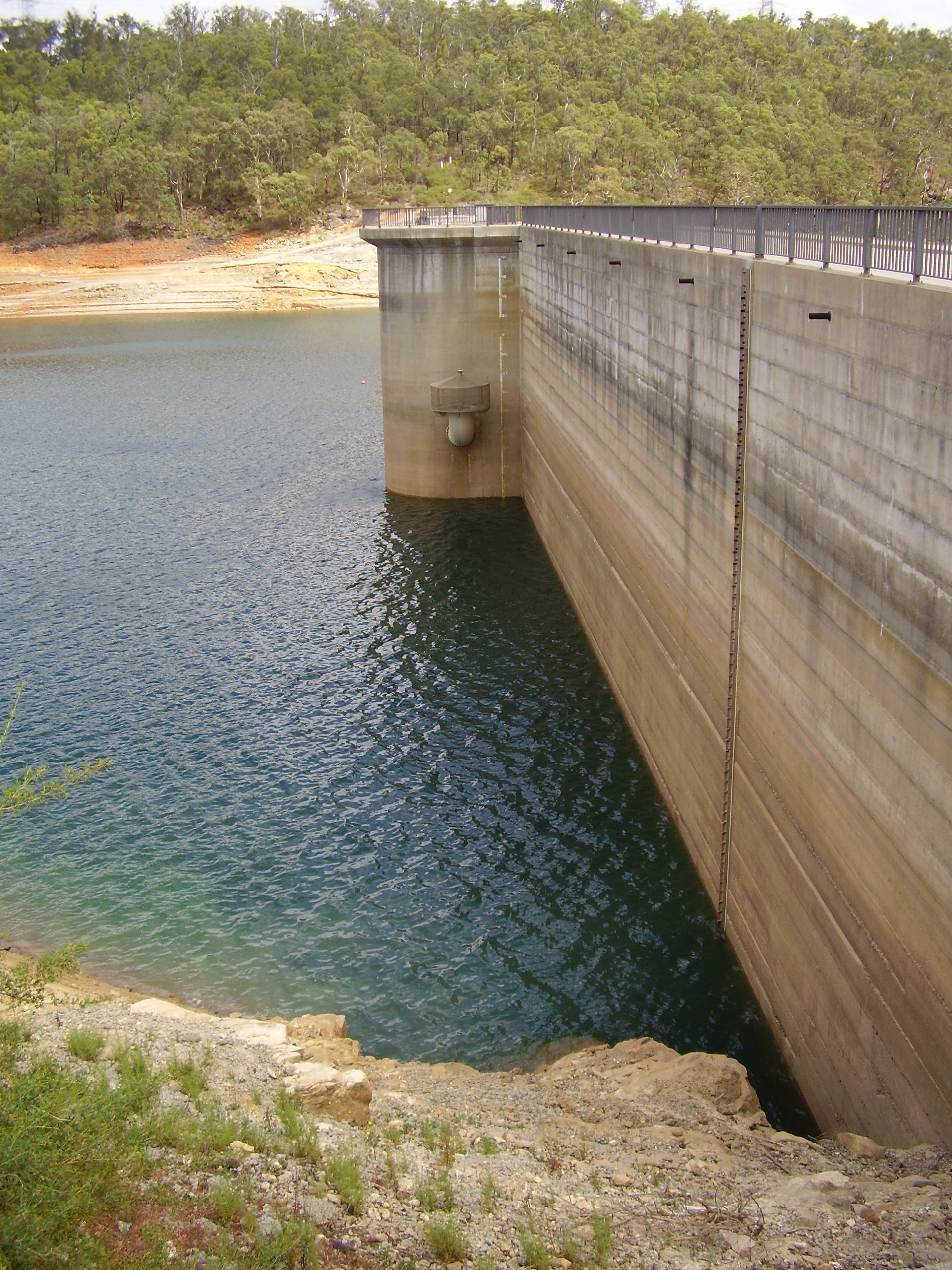
- New Victoria Dam at 30.6% of capacity
- Interactive map of New Victoria Dam
- Official name: Victoria Dam
- Location: Perth, Australia
- Coordinates: 32°02′33″S 116°04′02″E
- Construction began: 23 August 1990
- Opening date: 22 November 1991

Dam and spillways
- Impounds: Munday Brook
- Height: 52 m (171 ft)
- Length: 285 m (935 ft)

Reservoir
- Creates: Victoria Reservoir
- Catchment area: 37 km^{2} (14.3 mi^{2})
- Surface area: 0.77 km^{2} (0.30 mi^{2})

The decision to replace the Old Victoria Dam was made in 1989. Use of the old dam for water supply ended on 3 April 1990, and the old dam was partially demolished. Construction on the new dam started on 23 August 1990.

The new Victoria Dam wall was constructed just upstream from the old dam using roller-compacted concrete (RCC), rather than the more traditional method of large concrete pours or earthfill. It was the first dam built in Western Australia using this method, and at the time was the largest of this type built in Australia. Also, instead of using cement in the RCC, fly ash from the Muja Coal Power Station was used, which reduced costs and minimised the heat produced during the hardening of the concrete.

Due to the construction methods used, the dam was completed less than a year after excavation began on its foundations, halving the time it would have taken had more conventional methods been employed. The dam was officially opened on 22 November 1991 by Ernie Bridge, then the Minister for Water Resources.

The new dam supplies water to the Perth Hills suburbs of Kalamunda and Lesmurdie, and also supplies the rest of the metropolitan area in times of peak demand. The area is not open to full public access; it can only be visited by the public via walking trails.

== See also ==
- List of reservoirs and dams in Australia
- List of reservoirs and dams
