= Paulls Valley, Western Australia =

Paulls Valley
- Suburb
- Interactive map of Paulls Valley
- Coordinates: 31.954°S 116.097°E
- Country: Australia
- State: Western Australia
- City: Perth
- LGA: City of Kalamunda

Government
  - State electorate: Darling Range
  - Federal division: Hasluck

Population
  - Total: 83 (SAL 2021)
- Postcode: 6076
Suburbs around Paulls Valley
Darlington	Glen Forrest	Mundaring
Piesse Brook	Paulls Valley	Mundaring Weir
Piesse Brook	Hacketts Gully	Reservoir

Paulls Valley is a suburb of Perth, Western Australia within the city of Kalamunda. It was officially named in 1973 and commemorates Albert Paull, an early orchardist who settled in the district in 1914.

Bounded to the north by the Helena River valley the main access to the locality is from the Mundaring Weir Road, which bounds Paulls Valley to the south.

== Notable people ==
- Edgar Dell – botanical artist
