= Walliston, Western Australia =

Walliston Perth, Western Australia
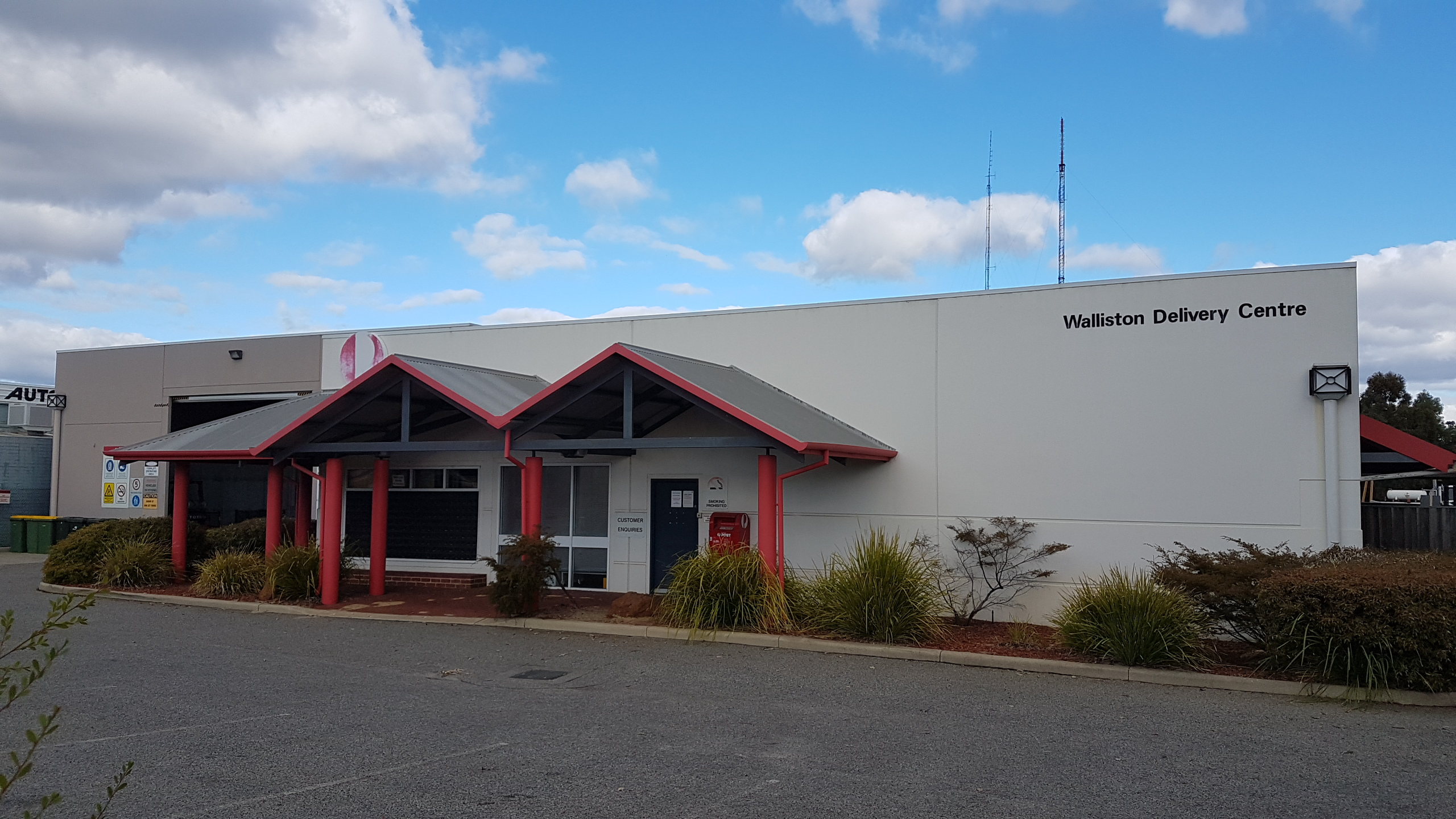
- Australia Post delivery centre in Walliston
- Coordinates: 31.997°S 116.074°E
- Population: 1,016 (SAL 2021)
- Postcode(s): 6076
- LGA(s): City of Kalamunda
- State electorate(s): Kalamunda
- Federal division(s): Bullwinkel
Suburbs around Walliston:
| Kalamunda | Kalamunda | Bickley |
| Lesmurdie | Walliston | Bickley |
| Carmel | Carmel | Bickley |

Walliston is a suburb of Perth, Western Australia, located within the City of Kalamunda.

Prior to 1949 it was a stopping place on the Upper Darling Range railway. It was named after John and Emma Wallis, the area's first settlers who arrived in the 1880s. The name was applied by the Railway Department in 1915.

In 2008 the Kalamunda shire redrew Walliston's suburb boundaries, resulting in Wallis Lane and the Wallis homestead, still occupied by descendants of John and Emma Wallis, no longer being considered part of the Suburb of Walliston.

The Nine Network's Perth Television transmission tower is located here.

This suburb's main feature is a light industrial area in the north-eastern part of the suburb, an Australia Post mail-processing centre, a Transperth bus depot, City of Kalamunda council equipment storage facilities, a large workshop and a few automotive specialists.

Walliston Primary School is a public primary school in the suburb.
