= Piesse Brook, Western Australia =

Piesse Brook
- Suburb
- Interactive map of Piesse Brook
- Coordinates: 31.971°S 116.080°E
- Country: Australia
- State: Western Australia
- City: Perth, Western Australia
- LGA: City of Kalamunda

Government
  - State electorate: Darling Range
  - Federal division: Bullwinkel

Population
  - Total: 214 (SAL 2021)
- Postcode: 6076
Suburbs around Piesse Brook
Gooseberry Hill	Darlington	Paulls Valley
Gooseberry Hill	Piesse Brook	Paulls Valley
Kalamunda	Bickley	Hacketts Gully

Piesse Brook is a suburb of Perth, Western Australia in the City of Kalamunda. It was officially named in 1972, although the name had been in use since 1890 for a watercourse in the area which honoured William Roper Piesse, a prominent citizen with a large family who were based in Guildford.
