= Gooseberry Hill, Western Australia =

Gooseberry Hill
- Suburb
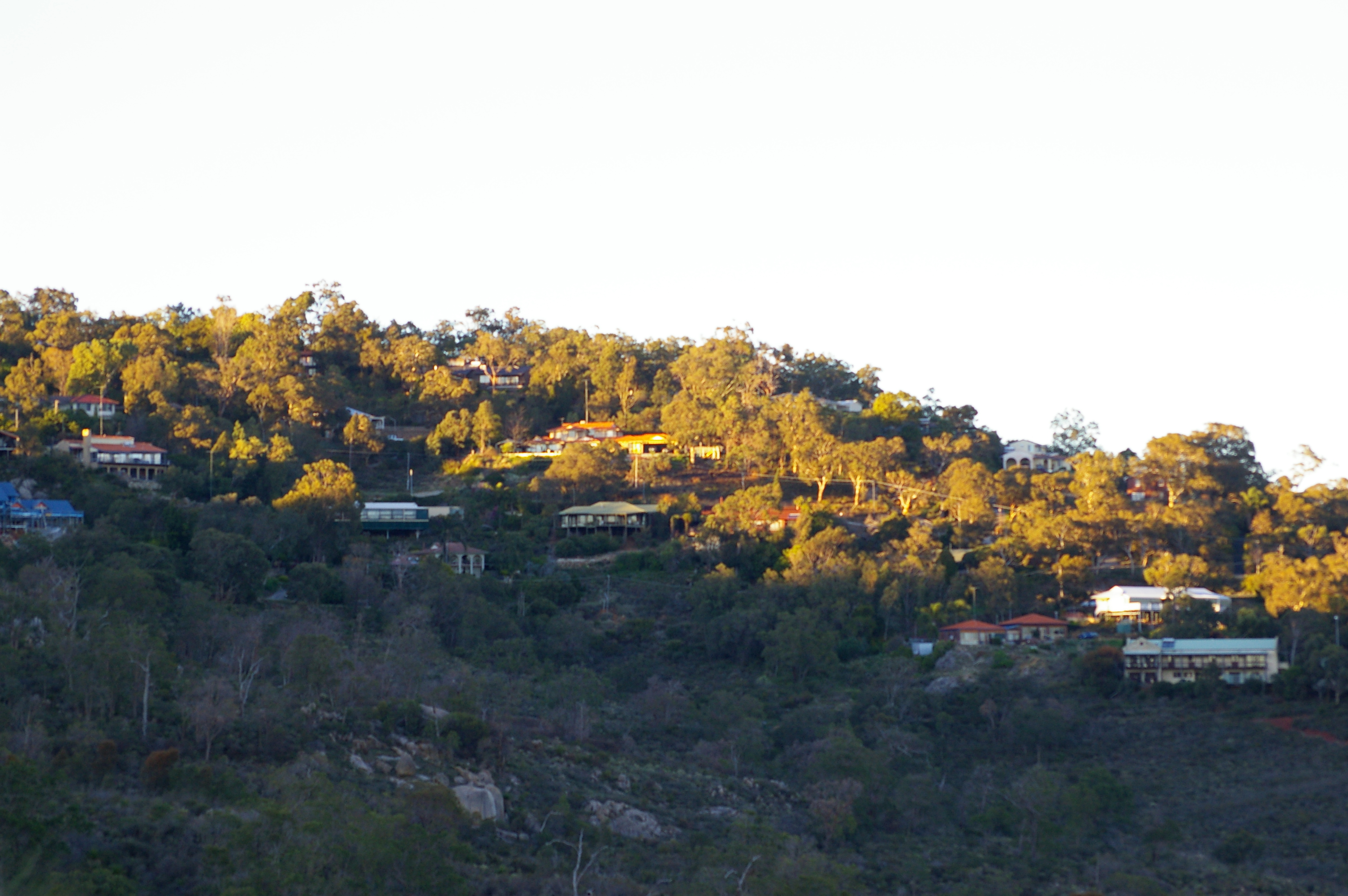
- Gooseberry Hill viewed from the Kalamunda Zig Zag
- Interactive map of Gooseberry Hill
- Coordinates: 31.954°S 116.049°E
- Country: Australia
- State: Western Australia
- City: Perth
- LGA: City of Kalamunda
- Location: 25 km (16 mi) from Perth

Government
  - State electorate: Forrestfield
  - Federal division: Bullwinkel

Population
  - Total: 3,323 (SAL 2021)
- Postcode: 6076
Suburbs around Gooseberry Hill
Hazlemere	Helena Valley	Darlington
Bushmead	Gooseberry Hill	Piesse Brook
Forrestfield	Kalamunda	Kalamunda

Gooseberry Hill is a suburb of Perth, Western Australia, located within the City of Kalamunda. It is the site of Gooseberry Hill National Park.

It is located at the highest point south of the departure of the Helena River from the Darling Scarp on to the Swan Coastal Plain. It is often associated with the railway formation of the Kalamunda Zig Zag and the northernmost high feature of Statham's Quarry, which lie on the north west of the locality within national park land.

In 1861, Benjamin Robins purchased 16 hectares (40 acres) of land in the area. In 1878 surveyor Henry Samuel Ranford recorded the name of the eponymous hill as Gooseberry Hill; that name, derived from the presence of cape gooseberries in the area, referred to the Kalamunda area generally in the late 19th century. The townsite was officially gazetted on 8 June 1959.

Gooseberry Hill was the location of a war-time tragedy when a United States Navy C-47 Skytrain (DC-3) plane crashed in heavy fog on 19 April 1945 after taking off from Guildford Airport (which became Perth Airport). All of the US servicemen, the Royal Navy officer, and three US Red Cross women on board were killed. The plane crashed between Gooseberry Hill Road and Lansdown Road, 7.2 kilometres (4.5 mi) from the end of the take-off runway, having travelled in an almost straight course to the point of impact.

The suburb contains two schools, Gooseberry Hill Primary School, a government school established in 1972, and Mary's Mount Primary School, a Catholic school established in 1921.

== Transport ==
=== Bus ===
- 274 Kalamunda Bus Station to Gooseberry Hill – serves Railway Road, Parke Road, Davies Crescent, Lenori Road, Ledger Road, Peoples Avenue, Arthur Road, John Street and Jessie Road
- 275 Walliston to High Wycombe Station – serves Kalamunda Road
- 276 Kalamunda Bus Station to High Wycombe Station – serves Railway Road and Gooseberry Hill Road
- 307 Kalamunda Bus Station to Midland Station – serves Railway Road, Gooseberry Hill Road and Watsonia Road
