= Bickley, Western Australia =

Bickley
- Suburb
- Interactive map of Bickley
- Coordinates: 32.008°S 116.091°E
- Country: Australia
- State: Western Australia
- City: Perth
- LGA: City of Kalamunda

Government
  - State electorate: Kalamunda
  - Federal division: Bullwinkel
- Elevation: 384 m (1,260 ft)

Population
  - Total: 713 (SAL 2021)
- Postcode: 6076
Suburbs around Bickley
Kalamunda	Piesse Brook	Hacketts Gully
Walliston	Bickley	Reservoir
Carmel	Pickering Brook	Pickering Brook

Bickley, formerly known as Heidelberg (German: [ˈhaɪ̯dl̩bɛʁk]) HY-dəl-berk), is a suburb located within the City of Kalamunda, in Perth, Western Australia.

It is situated on the Darling Scarp and is known for the brook of the same name.

== History ==
Before 1949, Bickley was a stopping place on the Upper Darling Range railway. It was originally known as "Heidelburg" or "Heidelberg", but during World War I, Western Australian Government Railways and Tramways renamed it "Bickley" after a local pioneer Wallace Bickley.

It has been the site of holiday and other sorts of camps.

The Seven Network and Australian Broadcasting Corporation's Perth television transmission towers have been located there since the founding of television in Perth in 1959.

Perth Observatory, originally situated in West Perth is also in Bickley.

It is also one of the major meteorological stations within the Perth Metropolitan Area due to its length of time of operation and location on the Darling Scarp.

It is also the location of water reservoirs.

== Climate ==
Bickley has a Mediterranean climate (Köppen climate classification Csa), like the rest of Perth. Bickley has one of the highest average annual rainfalls for the Perth metropolitan region, and it experiences cooler nights than the rest of Perth, due to its elevation above sea level (384 m for the official weather station) and its location on the Darling Scarp. Bickley has a microclimate.

Climate data for Bickley
Month	Jan	Feb	Mar	Apr	May	Jun	Jul	Aug	Sep	Oct	Nov	Dec	Year
Record high °C (°F)	41.8 (107.2)	42.1 (107.8)	41.0 (105.8)	36.5 (97.7)	31.0 (87.8)	23.0 (73.4)	22.0 (71.6)	26.6 (79.9)	31.3 (88.3)	35.8 (96.4)	38.9 (102.0)	41.0 (105.8)	42.1 (107.8)
Mean maximum °C (°F)	38.9 (102.0)	38.3 (100.9)	36.8 (98.2)	31.2 (88.2)	25.8 (78.4)	20.9 (69.6)	19.5 (67.1)	21.5 (70.7)	24.8 (76.6)	30.8 (87.4)	34.6 (94.3)	37.8 (100.0)	39.9 (103.8)
Mean daily maximum °C (°F)	30.5 (86.9)	30.5 (86.9)	27.9 (82.2)	23.6 (74.5)	19.3 (66.7)	16.2 (61.2)	15.1 (59.2)	16.0 (60.8)	17.6 (63.7)	21.2 (70.2)	25.1 (77.2)	28.2 (82.8)	22.6 (72.7)
Mean daily minimum °C (°F)	15.4 (59.7)	15.9 (60.6)	14.6 (58.3)	12.7 (54.9)	10.1 (50.2)	8.1 (46.6)	7.2 (45.0)	7.6 (45.7)	8.2 (46.8)	9.8 (49.6)	11.9 (53.4)	13.8 (56.8)	11.3 (52.3)
Mean minimum °C (°F)	9.8 (49.6)	10.3 (50.5)	8.9 (48.0)	7.4 (45.3)	5.5 (41.9)	3.9 (39.0)	3.0 (37.4)	3.2 (37.8)	3.5 (38.3)	4.9 (40.8)	7.0 (44.6)	8.4 (47.1)	2.4 (36.3)
Record low °C (°F)	8.0 (46.4)	8.0 (46.4)	5.0 (41.0)	4.4 (39.9)	3.0 (37.4)	1.9 (35.4)	1.0 (33.8)	1.0 (33.8)	1.0 (33.8)	3.0 (37.4)	4.0 (39.2)	5.0 (41.0)	1.0 (33.8)
Average rainfall mm (inches)	20.5 (0.81)	20.7 (0.81)	26.1 (1.03)	54.7 (2.15)	130.8 (5.15)	198.1 (7.80)	216.8 (8.54)	176.8 (6.96)	123.2 (4.85)	66.1 (2.60)	40.6 (1.60)	14.6 (0.57)	1,080.4 (42.54)
Average precipitation days	3.3	2.8	4.3	7.4	12.7	17.1	18.0	16.6	14.5	9.4	6.5	3.6	116.2
Average afternoon relative humidity (%) (at 15:00)	35	34	39	49	58	67	68	65	60	51	44	38	51
Source: Bureau of Meteorology; Temperatures: 1994–2020; Rain data: 1969–2020; Relative humidity: 1994–2010

== See also ==
- Australian place names changed from German names
