= Carmel, Western Australia =

Carmel
- Suburb
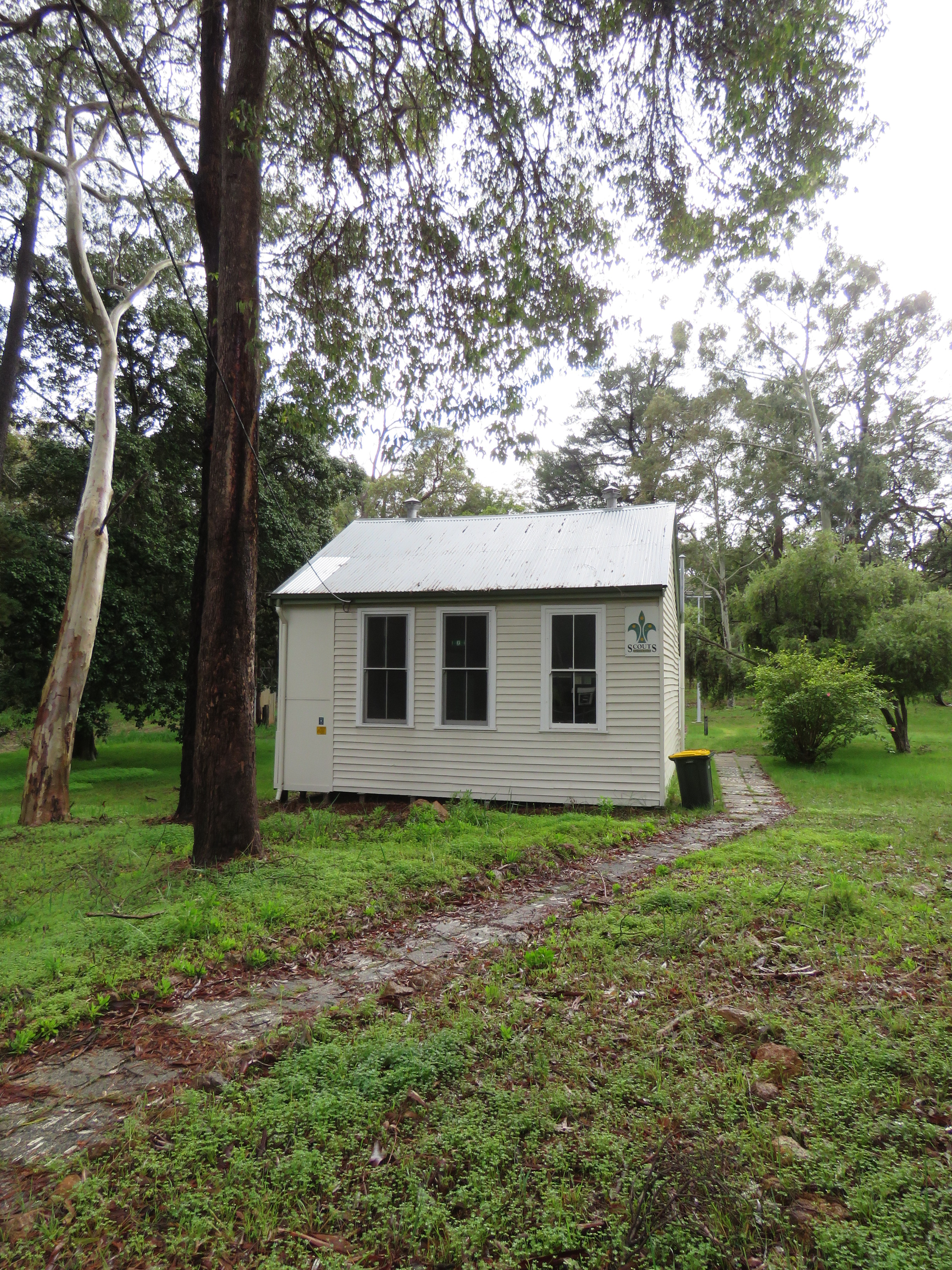
- The state heritage listed former Carmel Primary School
- Interactive map of Carmel
- Coordinates: 32.021°S 116.096°E
- Country: Australia
- State: Western Australia
- City: Perth
- LGA: City of Kalamunda

Government
  - State electorate: Kalamunda
  - Federal division: Canning

Population
  - Total: 754 (SAL 2021)
- Postcode: 6076
Suburbs around Carmel
Lesmurdie	Walliston	Bickley
Lesmurdie	Carmel	Pickering Brook
Canning Mills	Canning Mills	Pickering Brook

Carmel is a suburb of Perth, Western Australia, located within the City of Kalamunda.

Prior to 1949 it was a stopping place on the Upper Darling Range railway. The railway siding was originally known as Green's Landing after Perth businessman Levi Green, who had moved into the area in 1844. In 1915, the name Carmel, meaning "park" or "garden of God" in Hebrew, was adopted.

The transmission tower for Network 10 in Perth is located here.
