= Statham's Quarry =

Quarry in Perth, Western Australia

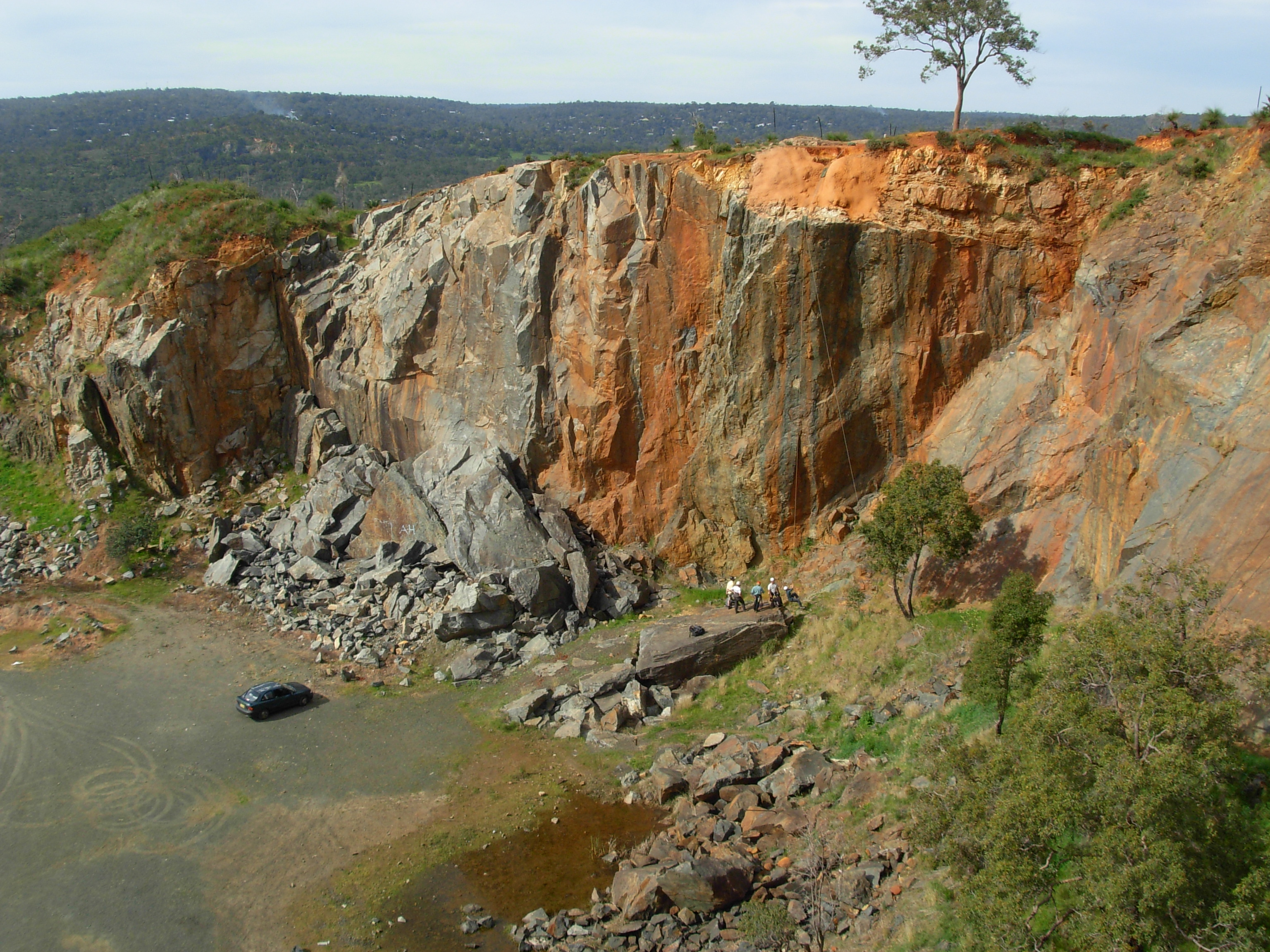
- Stathams Quarry from the top of the south wall looking north – another quarry in the distance at the top of the picture is the old Government Quarry now known as the Hudman Road Quarry in Boya at the border with Darlington
- Interactive map of the Statham's Quarry area

General information
- Type: Quarry
- Location: Gooseberry Hill, Western Australia
- Coordinates: 31°56′03″S 116°02′53″E

Western Australia Heritage Register
- Type: State Registered Place
- Designated: 31 July 2007
- Reference no.: 10570

Statham's Quarry (also known as Darling Range Quarry, and then Perth City Council's Darling Range Quarry after 1920) is the site of a quarry on the Darling Scarp on the southern side of the entrance of the Helena River valley on to the Swan Coastal Plain in Perth, Western Australia. It is located in Gooseberry Hill and is within the bounds of the Gooseberry Hill National Park.

== History ==
Established by Thomas Statham and William Burton in 1894, Statham's Quarry is considered a rare example of a stone quarry which has retained physical evidence of its operations and is associated with the development of the quarry industry in Western Australia.

The Perth City Council operated the quarry following Statham's death and material from the quarry was used as street paving in Perth during the early 1900s. The rocks for the groyne at City Beach also came from the quarry.

There was also a clay quarry operation known as Statham's in Glen Forrest which was a brickworks.

The quarry is the claimed location of one of the most extensive dolerite dikes on the Darling Scarp.

The quarry was serviced by the Kalamunda Zig Zag section of the Upper Darling Range railway during the time of its operation (which closed in 1949), and was finally put out of operation by a bushfire in 1957. The location has been susceptible to bushfires, the most recent being in the early 2000s.

== Current usage ==
The main current usage of the quarry is rock climbing and abseiling, with the Department of Parks and Wildlife providing facilities and maintaining the site. Dangerous areas are signed and fenced off.

The quarry's importance as a safe easily accessible and well maintained climbing and abseiling location close to the metropolitan area of Perth can be found in the climbing records.

== Map ==
- Allen, M. W.(1928) Darling Range Quarry [cartographic material]: City of Perth. Perth, W.A. Scale 1:792 [1 in. = 1 chain] (Battye Library catalogue description: Map of Perth City Council's Darling Range Quarry (Statham's Quarry) showing the quarry face with contours, railway and sidings, buildings, fences, telephone lines, pipes, formation of Canning Jarrah Timber Company's old line, Ridge Hill and Stathams (old) sidings, watercourses, heights above sea level, boundary of Perth City Council reserve. Battye accession number 009255.
