= Golding =

Golding is an English surname.

People with the surname include:

- Andrew Golding (born 1963), English cricketer
- Arthur Golding (c. 1536–1606), English translator
- Ashton Golding (born 1996), Jamaican rugby league footballer
- Belle Golding (1864–1940), Australian feminist activist
- Benjamin Golding (1793–1863), British doctor
- Bill Golding (1916–1999), Australian rules footballer
- Binker Golding (born 1985), British jazz musician
- Bob Golding (born 1970), English actor
- Bruce Golding (born 1947), Jamaican politician
- Charles Golding (disambiguation)
- Cindy Golding (born 1952), American politician and businesswoman
- Edward Golding (disambiguation)
- Frank Golding (1890–1966), Australian rules footballer
- George Golding (1906–1999), Australian runner
- Germaine Golding (1887–1973), French tennis player
- Grant Golding (born 1981), Canadian gymnast
- Henry Golding (born 1987), British–Malaysian actor
- Henry Golding (died 1576), British Member of Parliament
- Henry Golding (died 1593), British Member of Parliament
- James Golding (cricketer) (born 1977), English cricketer
- James Golding (racing driver) (born 1996), Australian racing driver
- Jean Golding (born 1939), British epidemiologist
- Joe Golding (1921–1971), American football player
- Joe Golding (basketball) (born 1975), American basketball coach
- John Golding (disambiguation)
- Jon Golding (born 1982), English rugby union player
- Joseph Golding, Irish football player
- Julia Golding (born 1969), British novelist
- Julian Golding (born 1975), English sprinter
- Leroy Golding, British actor
- Llin Golding, Baroness Golding (born 1933), British politician
- Lorna Golding (born 1951), First Lady of Jamaica
- Louis Golding (1895–1958), British writer
- Lynval Golding (born 1951), Jamaican-born British musician
- Margarette Golding (1881–1939), Welsh nurse and company director
- Margery Golding (c. 1526–1568), Countess of Oxford
- Martin Golding (born 1930), American philosopher
- Matthew Golding (footballer) (born 1980), Australian rules footballer
- Matthew Golding (dancer) (born 1985), Canadian ballet dancer
- Meta Golding (born 1971), Haitian-American actress
- Michael Golding, American novelist
- Mike Golding (born 1960), British yachtsman
- Miles Golding (born 1951), Australian classical violinist
- Monica Golding (1902–1997), British Army nurse
- Pam Golding (1928–2018), South African property developer
- Paul Golding (born 1982), British nationalist activist
- Peaches Golding (born 1953), High Sheriff of Bristol
- Pete Golding (born 1984), American football coach
- Peter Golding, English fashion designer
- Philip Golding (born 1962), English golfer
- Richard Golding (died 1520), Irish judge
- Richard Golding (engraver) (1785–1865), English engraver
- Simon Golding (born 1946), Church of England priest
- Stephen L. Golding (born 1944), psychologist at the University of Utah
- Sue Golding (born 1958), American academic
- Susan Golding (born 1945), American politician
- Tacius Golding (1900–1995), Jamaican politician
- Val Golding (1930–2008), American magazine editor
- William Golding (1911–1993), English novelist and poet
- William Henry Golding (1878–1961), Canadian politician
- William Hughson Golding (1845–1916), founder of Golding & Company
- William Golding, master of HMS Manly (1804)

== See also ==
- Goldin, a Jewish surname
- Goulding (surname)
- John Golden (pirate) (died 1694), English pirate also known as John Golding
