= Golding (disambiguation) =

Golding is a surname of English origin.

Golding may also refer to:

- Golding Island, one of the Falkland Islands
- Golding baronets, an extinct title in the Baronetage of England
- Golding Bird (1814–1854), British medical doctor
- Llin Golding, Baroness Golding (born 1933), British politician (the title Baroness Golding is a life peerage)
- Goldings, a variety of hop
- Golding Contractors, an Australian construction company
- Golding & Company, a defunct American manufacturer of platen printing presses and printers' tools
- Operation Golding, a London Metropolitan Police investigation of alleged phone hacking by newspapers

== See also ==
- Gilding, the application of fine gold leaf or powder to solid surfaces
- Gold (disambiguation)
- Golden (disambiguation)
- Goldin, a Jewish surname
- Goulding (disambiguation)
