= Airport Central railway station =

Underground station in Perth, Western Australia

Airport Central
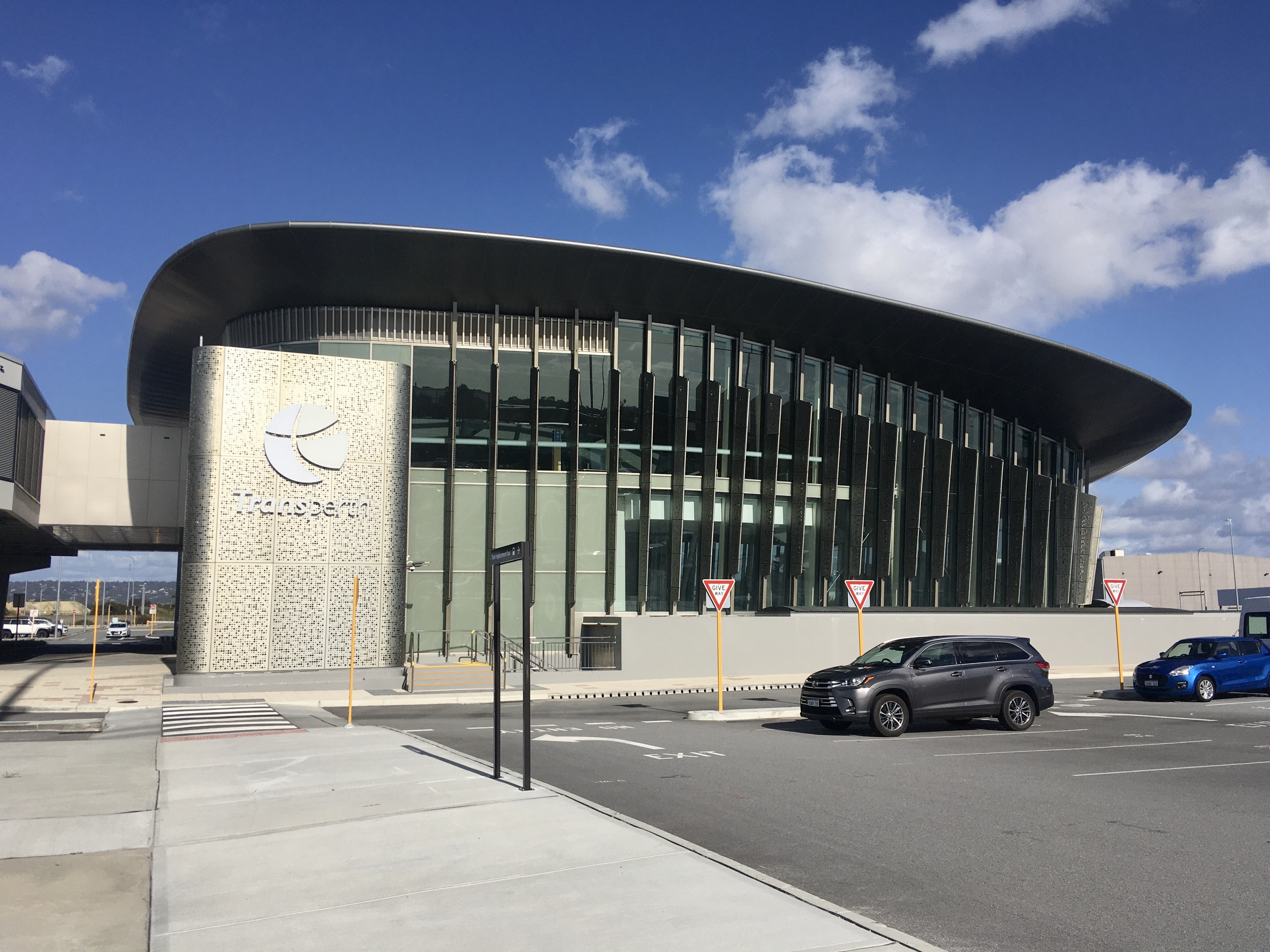
- Exterior of the station building at Airport Central railway station, October 2022

General information
- Location: Airport Drive, Perth Airport; Western Australia; Australia
- Coordinates: 31°56′39″S 115°58′29″E
- Owner: Public Transport Authority
- Operator: Public Transport Authority
- Line: Airport line
- Platforms: 1 island platform with 2 platform edges
- Tracks: 2

Construction
- Structure type: Underground
- Depth: 17 metres (56 ft)
- Parking: No
- Cycle facilities: No
- Accessible: Yes

Other information
- Fare zone: 2

History
- Opened: 9 October 2022

Services
Preceding station	Transperth	Following station
Redcliffe towards Perth or Claremont	Airport line	High Wycombe Terminus
Location
- Location of Airport Central station

Airport Central railway station is an underground Transperth commuter railway station at terminals one and two of Perth Airport in Western Australia. The station is located on the Airport line and is one of three stations that were built as part of the Forrestfield–Airport Link project.

The contract for the Forrestfield–Airport Link, which consists of 8 kilometres (5 mi) of twin bored tunnels and three new stations, was awarded to Salini Impregilo and NRW Pty Ltd in April 2016. Construction on Airport Central station began in March 2017 following preparatory work. By January 2018, excavation was complete and, in May 2018, the two tunnel boring machines (TBMs) reached the station after tunnelling from High Wycombe. The TBMs left the station tunnelling north-west in July, and construction of the rest of the station started. As well as the station, a 280-metre (920 ft) elevated walkway was built by Georgiou Group, linking the station to the airport's terminal T1.

Originally planned to open in 2020, the line officially opened on 9 October 2022. It is served by trains every twelve minutes during peak hour and every fifteen minutes outside peak and on weekends and public holidays. At night, trains are half-hourly or hourly. The journey to Perth station takes eighteen minutes.

== Description ==
Airport Central station is located adjacent to the air traffic control tower at Perth Airport terminals one and two (T1 and T2). To the east, the adjacent station is High Wycombe station. To the north-west, the adjacent station is Redcliffe station, which leads to Perth station and connections to the other lines on the Transperth system.

The station has three levels: a below-ground platform level, a below-ground concourse level above the platform level, and an above-ground entrance level which connects to a 280-metre-long (920 ft) elevated walkway called the Skybridge. The Skybridge crosses over a car park towards T1, with lifts and stairs connecting the Skybridge to external ground level approximately 200 metres (660 ft) east of T2. Linking the entrance level to the concourse level are two lifts and three escalators, which were the longest operational escalators in the southern hemisphere at 35 metres (115 ft) long and 15 metres (49 ft) high, until they were overtaken by 45-metre (148 ft) escalators at Sydney Central station in 2024. On the concourse are fare gates and toilets. Linking the concourse to the platform are two lifts, two pairs of escalators, and two sets of stairs. The platform level consists of an island platform 12.5 metres (41 ft) wide and 150 metres (490 ft) long at a depth of 17 metres (56 ft) below ground level. Each of the two platform edges can accommodate a six-car Transperth train.

The station was designed by Weston Williamson and GHD Woodhead. In June 2023, the station won the Award for Public Architecture at the Australian Institute of Architects's WA Architect Awards.

The station takes its name from the Airport Central precinct, which encompasses the area around T1 and T2. Rather than be located directly next to T1, the station is placed centrally within the precinct so that it is as close as possible to any future terminals. Under the Perth Airport master plan, terminals three and four (T3 and T4) near Redcliffe station will be replaced by new terminals in the Airport Central precinct. The master plan states that new terminals will be connected to the station via an extension of the Skybridge or by a new underground walkway. A proposed hotel next to the station may also be connected to the Skybridge. As of 2024, T3 and T4 are planned to be replaced by new terminals at Airport Central from 2031.

Skybridge

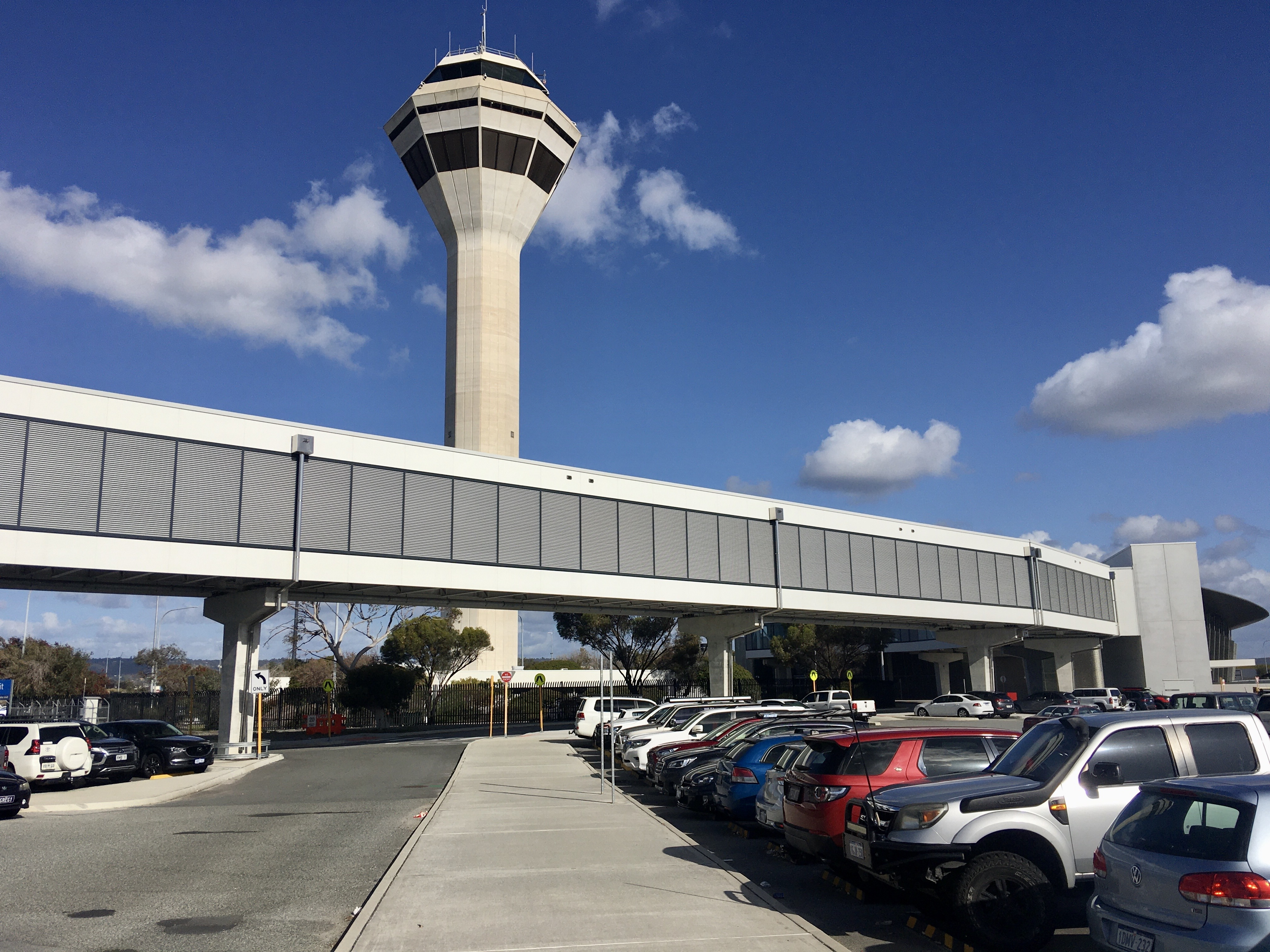
Exterior of the Skybridge viewed from the airport's carpark

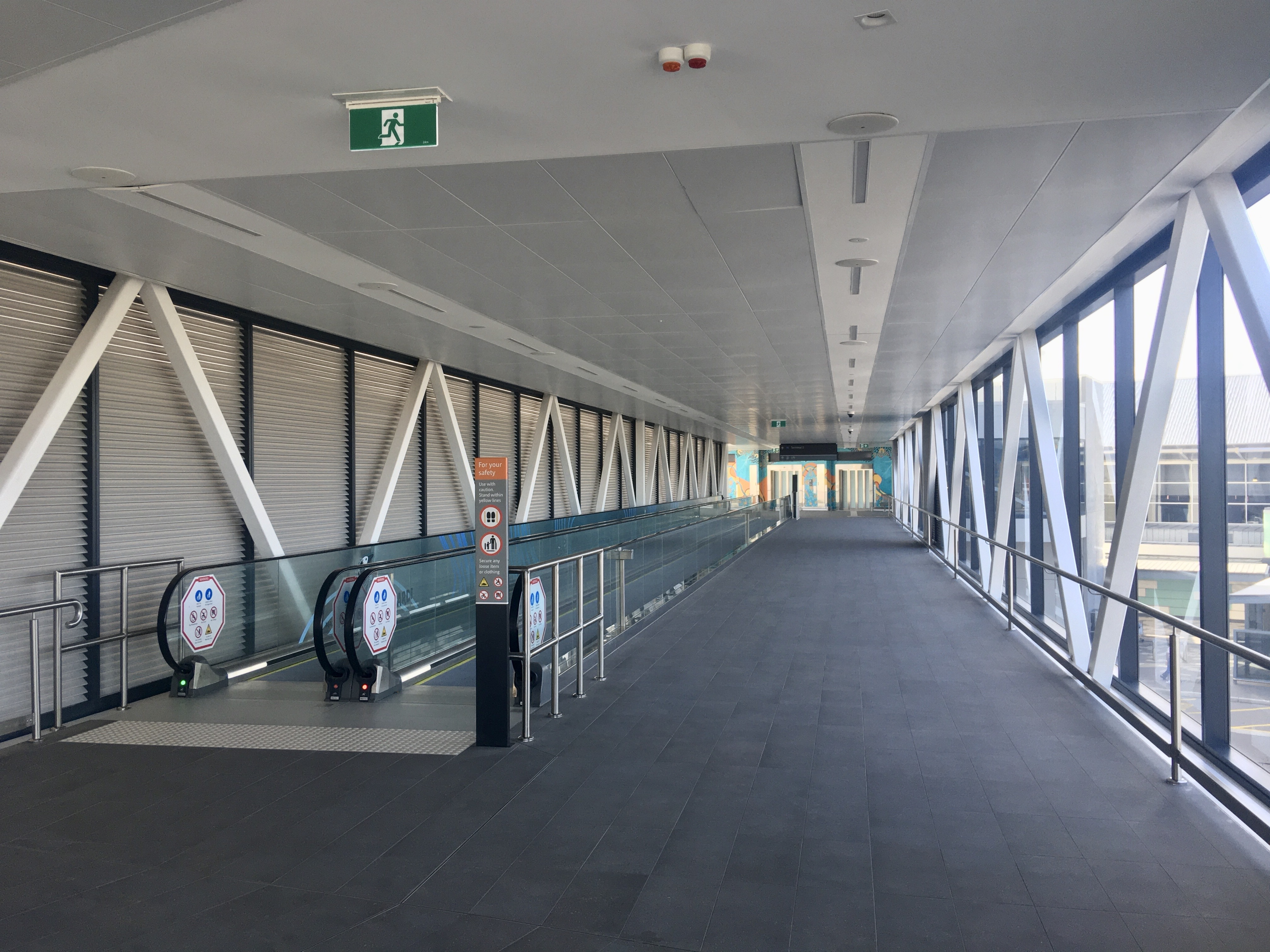
Interior of the Skybridge with travellators in view

=== Public art ===
The design of the roof is based on the contours of aircraft. There is a two-part artwork along the northern and southern interior walls of the station by Anne Neil and John Walley entitled Journeys. The artwork along the northern wall consists of multi-coloured petal-shaped objects designed to evoke birds and flight. On the southern wall are 50 glass panels with an artwork designed to "describe the Noongar (Note: The Noongar are the local Aboriginal group of the south-west of Western Australia.) connection to the river and estuary waters, and the journeys traditionally taken in accordance with the six seasons." Within the Skybridge, audio plays reflecting upon the significance of the Swan River and the Whadjuk country to the Noongar people. The audio consists of a narrative voiceover by a traditional custodian, animal sounds, and an original musical score. The audio changes throughout the day, mimicking the journey along the Swan River. There is also artwork along the Skybridge walls and travellators designed by Jade Dolman and Crispian Warrell of Nani Creative.

Artwork at Airport Central station

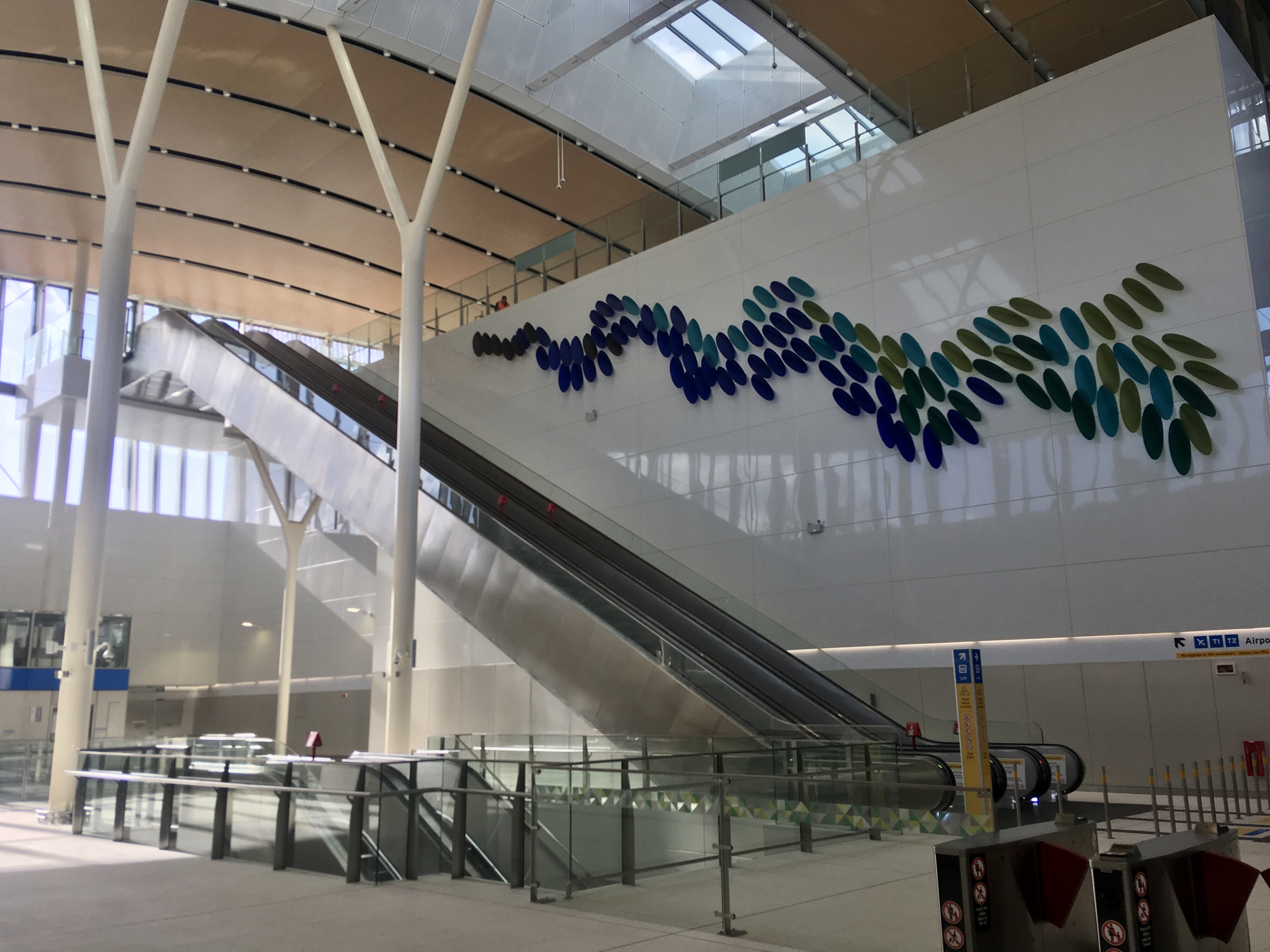
Artwork along the northern interior wall of the station. Included in this view is the aforementioned escalator.

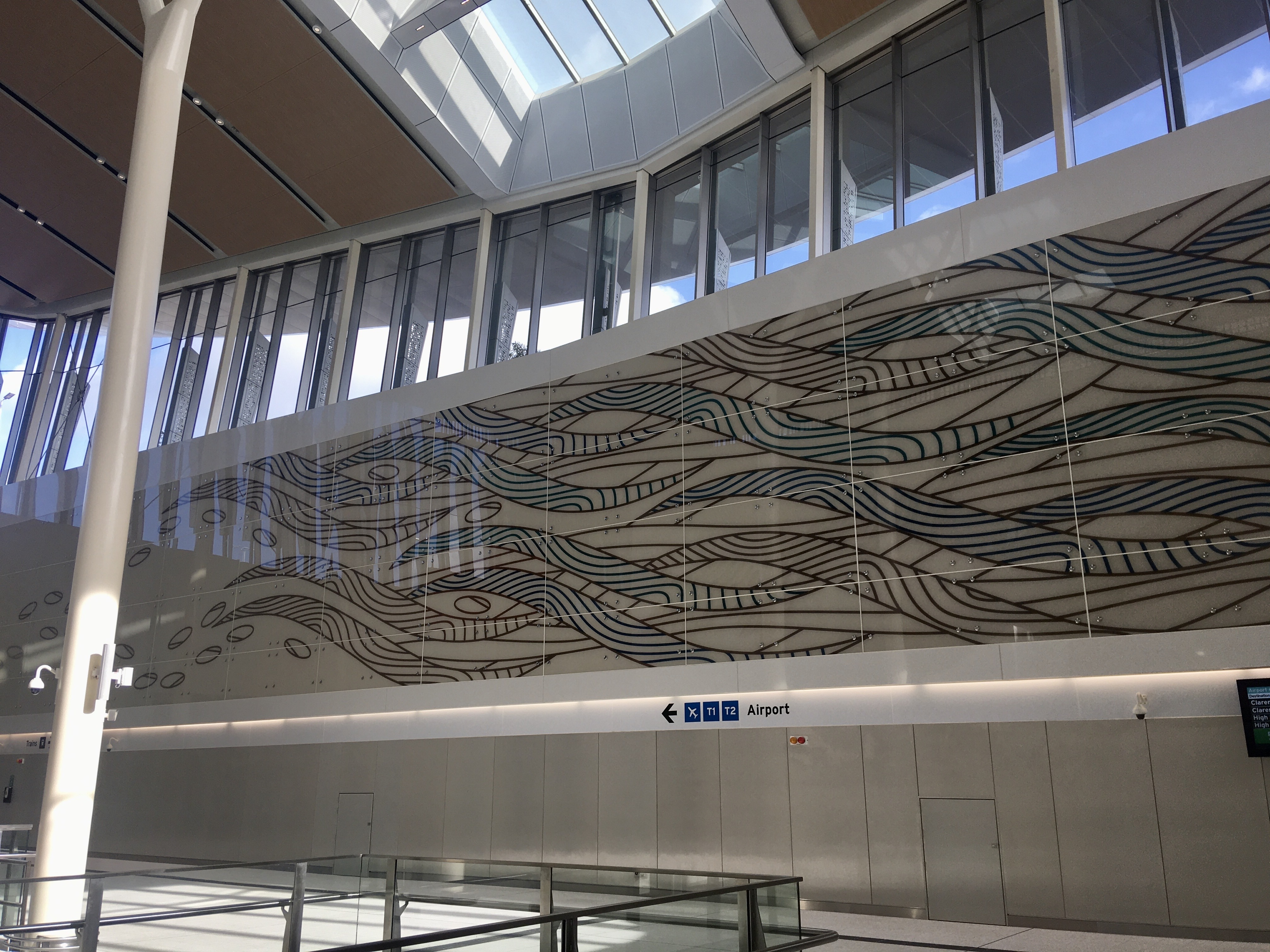
Artwork along the southern interior wall of the station

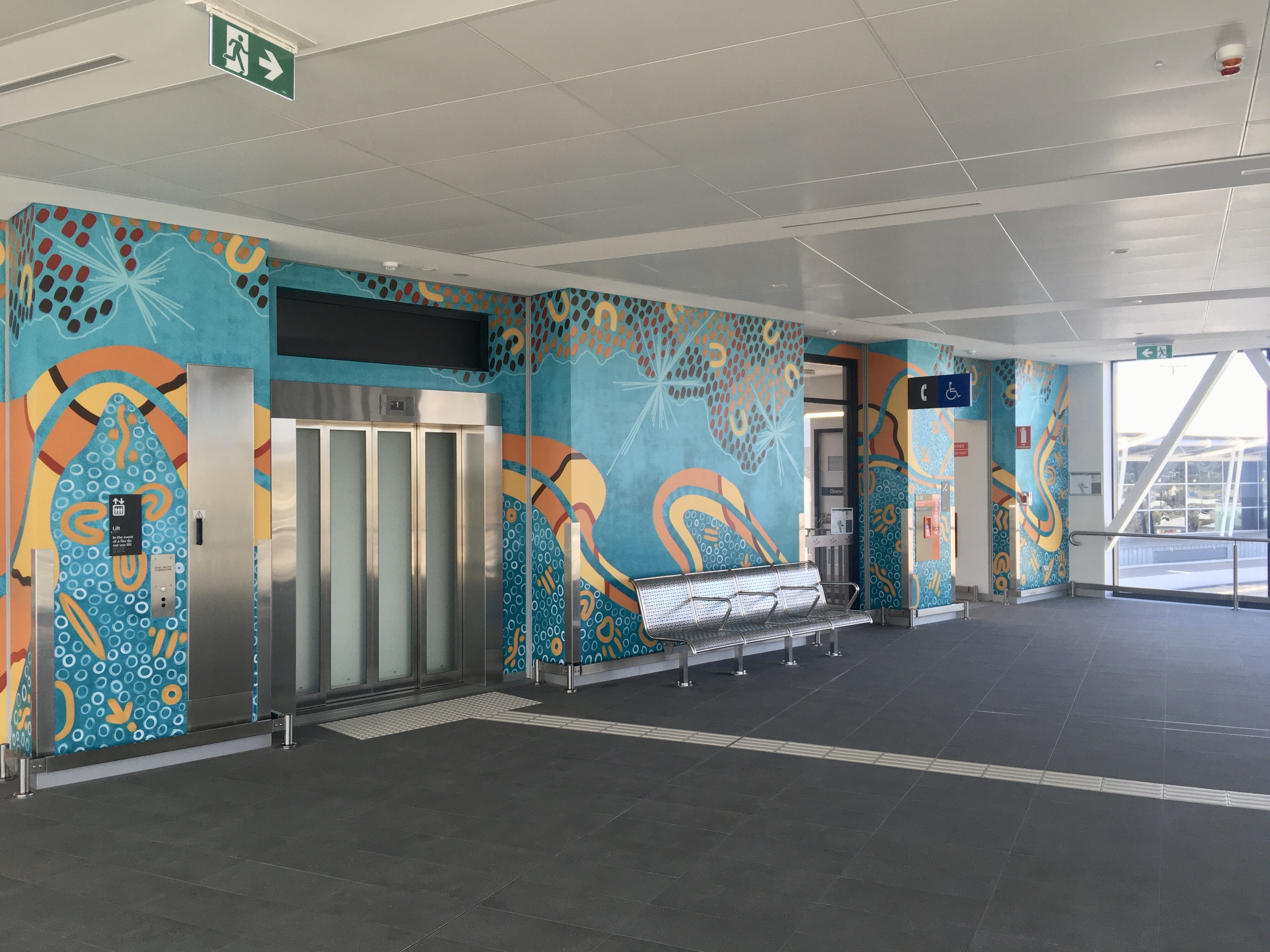
Northern end of the Skybridge with Indigenous-inspired artwork

== History ==
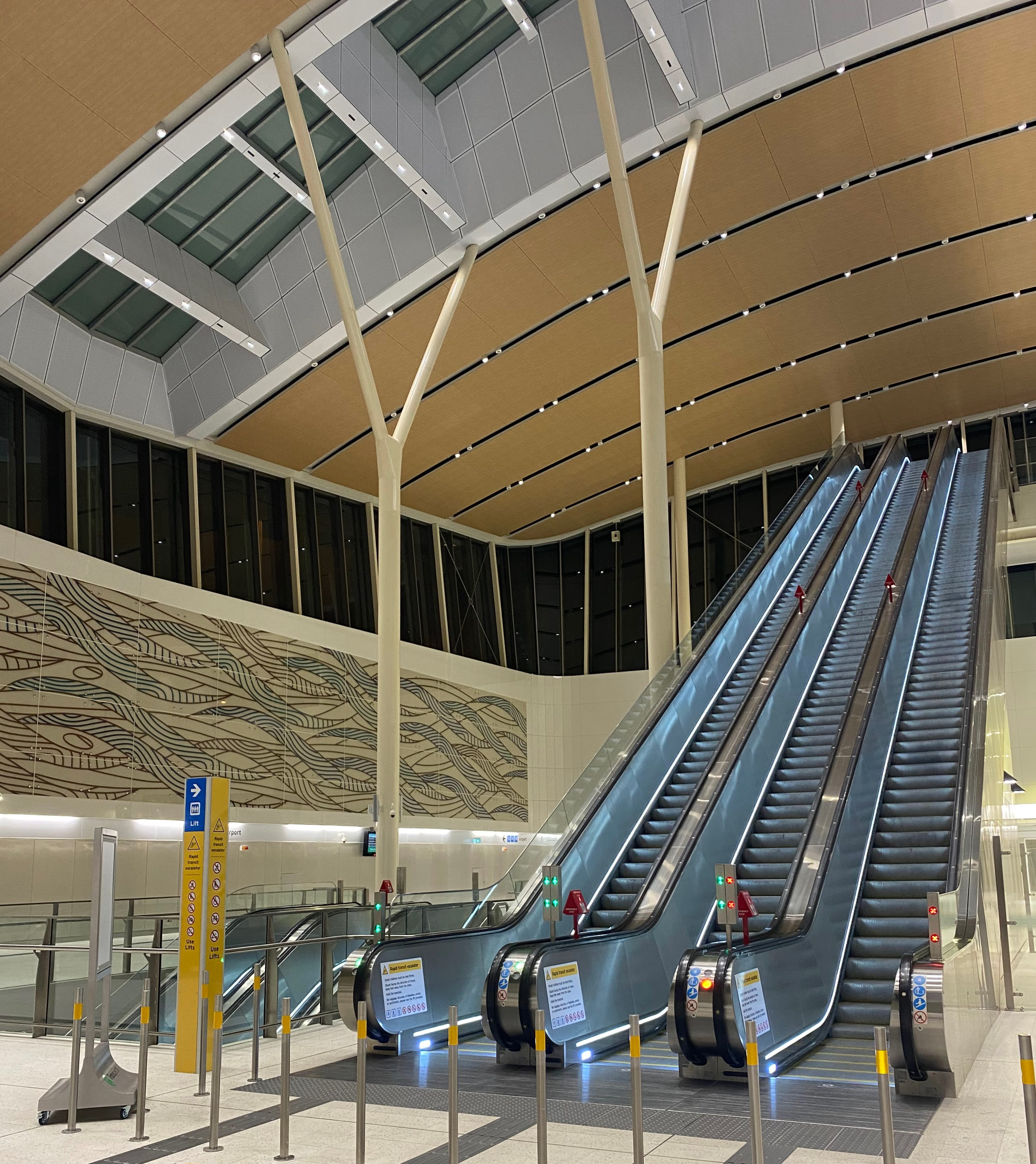
The three 35 meter long escalators

During initial planning, the station was called Consolidated Airport station due to the planned consolidation of all passenger terminals to the precinct. The station was built by the Public Transport Authority (PTA) as part of the Forrestfield–Airport Link project, which involved the construction of 8 kilometres (5 mi) of twin bored tunnels from High Wycombe to Bayswater and two other stations: Forrestfield (later renamed High Wycombe) and Belmont (later renamed Redcliffe) stations. The station was renamed to its present name in April 2016 upon the awarding of the main contract, worth A$1.176 billion, to a joint venture of Salini Impregilo and NRW Pty Ltd (SI/NRW). At the time the contract was signed, the station was expected to be in operation by 2020. Weston Williamson and GHD Woodhead were appointed by SI/NRW as the designers of the three stations. The construction of the Skybridge was under a different contract, awarded to Georgiou Group in late 2018 for $31 million. The Skybridge was funded partly by an $8.6 million contribution by Perth Airport and partly by the Forrestfield–Airport Link budget; its construction was managed by Perth Airport.

In late 2016, work began on reorganising the airport's car park and car rental booths to make way for the Airport Central station construction site. The station box was planned to be excavated and constructed between March 2017 and February 2018. During this time a headstone from the 1890s was discovered. Construction on the station began in May 2017, starting with the construction of diaphragm walls. The station's design was released in May 2017. The diaphragm walls were completed in July 2017, allowing excavation to begin the same month. Excavation was completed in January 2018 and construction of the concrete base slab commenced the following month. The base slab was completed by April 2018.

The two tunnel boring machines (TBMs) were planned to arrive at Airport Central station in late February and late March 2018, having tunnelled from High Wycombe. This was delayed after the first TBM, Grace, was stopped on 14 February following a ground disturbance issue. This also caused the second TBM, Sandy, to stop on 28 March so that it would not be tunnelling next to Grace. The two TBMs resumed tunnelling in April. Grace arrived at the station on 8 May, and Sandy arrived on 19 May. After undergoing maintenance, both TBMs left the station in July, tunnelling towards Redcliffe. Construction on other elements of the station commenced after that, including staircases and infrastructure for the escalators and lifts.

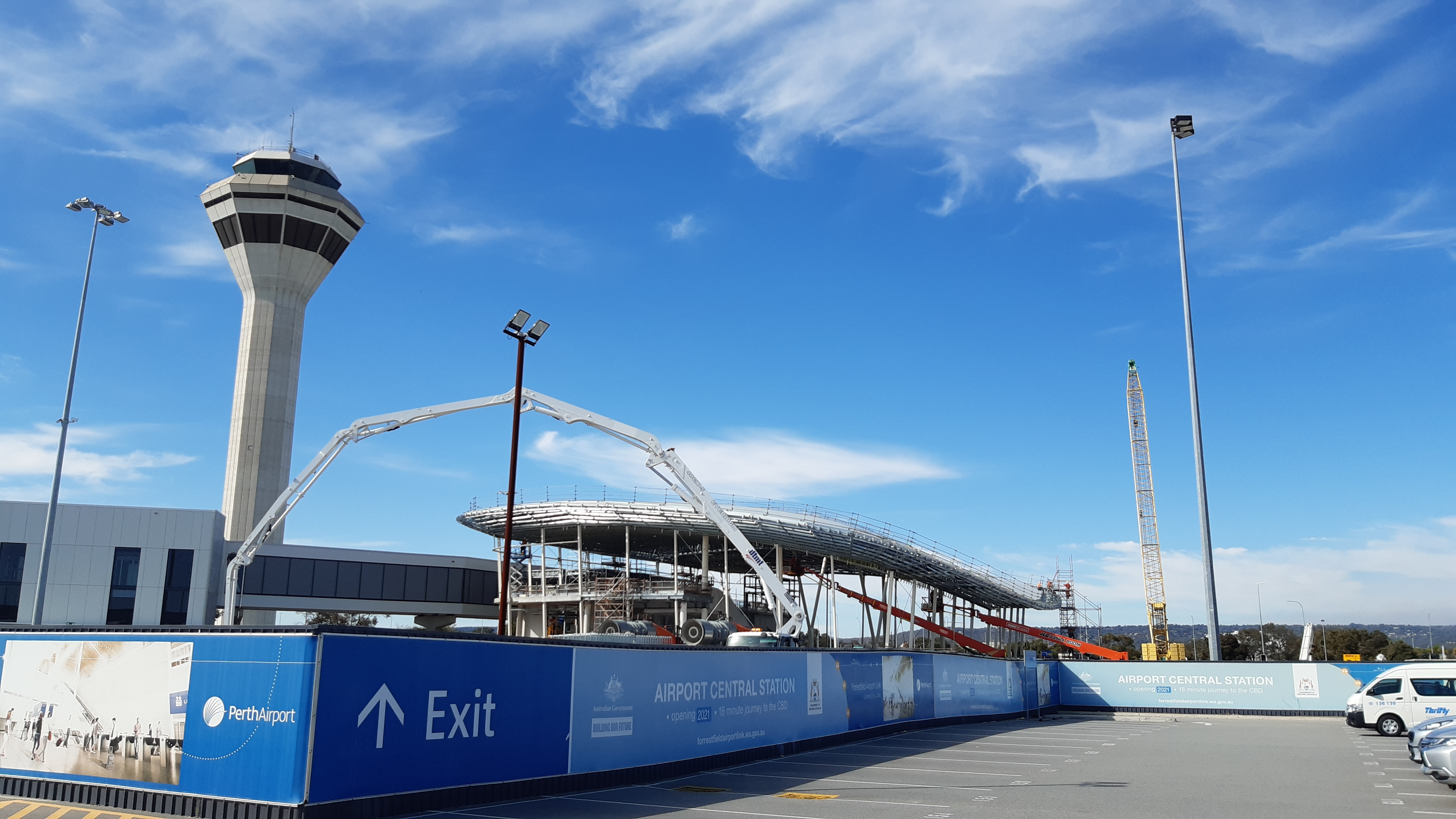
Airport Central station under construction in May 2020

In November 2018, construction on the Skybridge started. Construction on the station's steel structure and the concrete concourse slab began in early 2019. The 35-metre-long (115 ft) escalators were installed in May and June 2019. In mid-2019, construction of the platform and ventilation structures at the eastern and western ends of the station began and the modules for the Skybridge began to be lifted into place. By November 2019, the concourse slab and the steel lift frames were complete and the Skybridge was connected to the station. The Skybridge achieved practical completion in early 2020. By March 2020, the station was 70 percent complete and the roof was beginning to be installed. The roof was mostly complete by June 2020, allowing work such as the fit-out of escalators and lifts and the installation of cladding along the walls to commence.

In December 2018, State Transport Minister Rita Saffioti announced that the opening date of the project had been delayed from 2020 to 2021. In May 2021, she announced that the project had been delayed again, the new opening date being the first half of 2022. Following the state budget in May 2022, the government changed its position on the line's opening date, saying it would open some time later in the year. On 16 August, the opening date was revealed to be 9 October 2022, which is when the station did open.

== Services ==
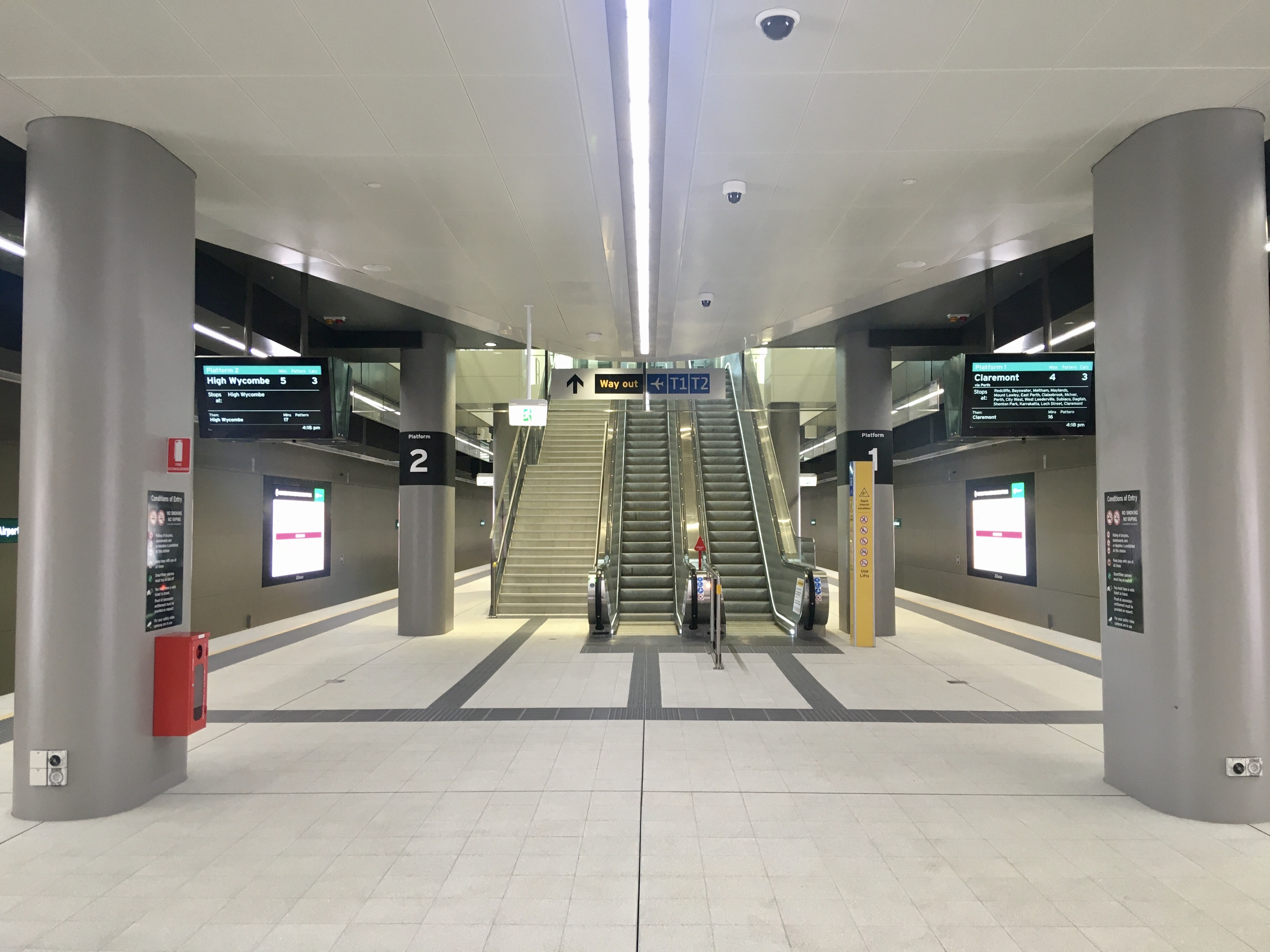
Airport Central station platform

Airport Central station is served by the Airport line on the Transperth network. These services are operated by the PTA. To the east, the line terminates at the next station, High Wycombe. To the west, the line joins the Midland line and Ellenbrook line two stations along at Bayswater, running along that line to Perth station, before running along the Fremantle line to terminate at Claremont station. Airport line trains stop at the station every twelve minutes during peak on weekdays and every fifteen minutes outside peak and on weekends and public holidays. At night, trains are half-hourly or hourly. The last train leaves at about 2 am with the next train arriving approximately four to five hours later – 5:30 am on weekdays in 2022 – which has been criticised for not being early enough for fly-in fly-out workers, whose flights typically leave in the early morning. The Mining and Energy Union called for the government to tweak the train schedule. The transport minister has said that the line needs to be closed for maintenance overnight but that she would look at what could be done. The Airport line caters to about 80 percent of flights. The station was predicted to have average daily boardings of 6,100 upon opening, rising to 11,000 in 2031. The journey to Perth station takes eighteen minutes. The station is in fare zone two, and there is no surcharge.

South-west of the station is a bus stop which is used by rail replacement bus services to Perth and High Wycombe as well as bus routes 37 and 224, which travel to Cannington and Oats Street stations respectively.
