= William Golding (disambiguation) =

William Golding (1911–1993) was a British writer.

William or Bill Golding may also refer to:

- William Henry Golding (1878-1961), a Liberal party member of the Canadian House of Commons
- William Hughson Golding, founder of Golding & Company
- William Golding, master of HMS Manly (1804)

== See also ==
- Bill Golding (1916–1999), Australian rules footballer

== See also ==
- William Goulding (disambiguation)
- William Golden (disambiguation)
