= Redcliffe railway station =

Railway station in Perth, Western Australia

Redcliffe
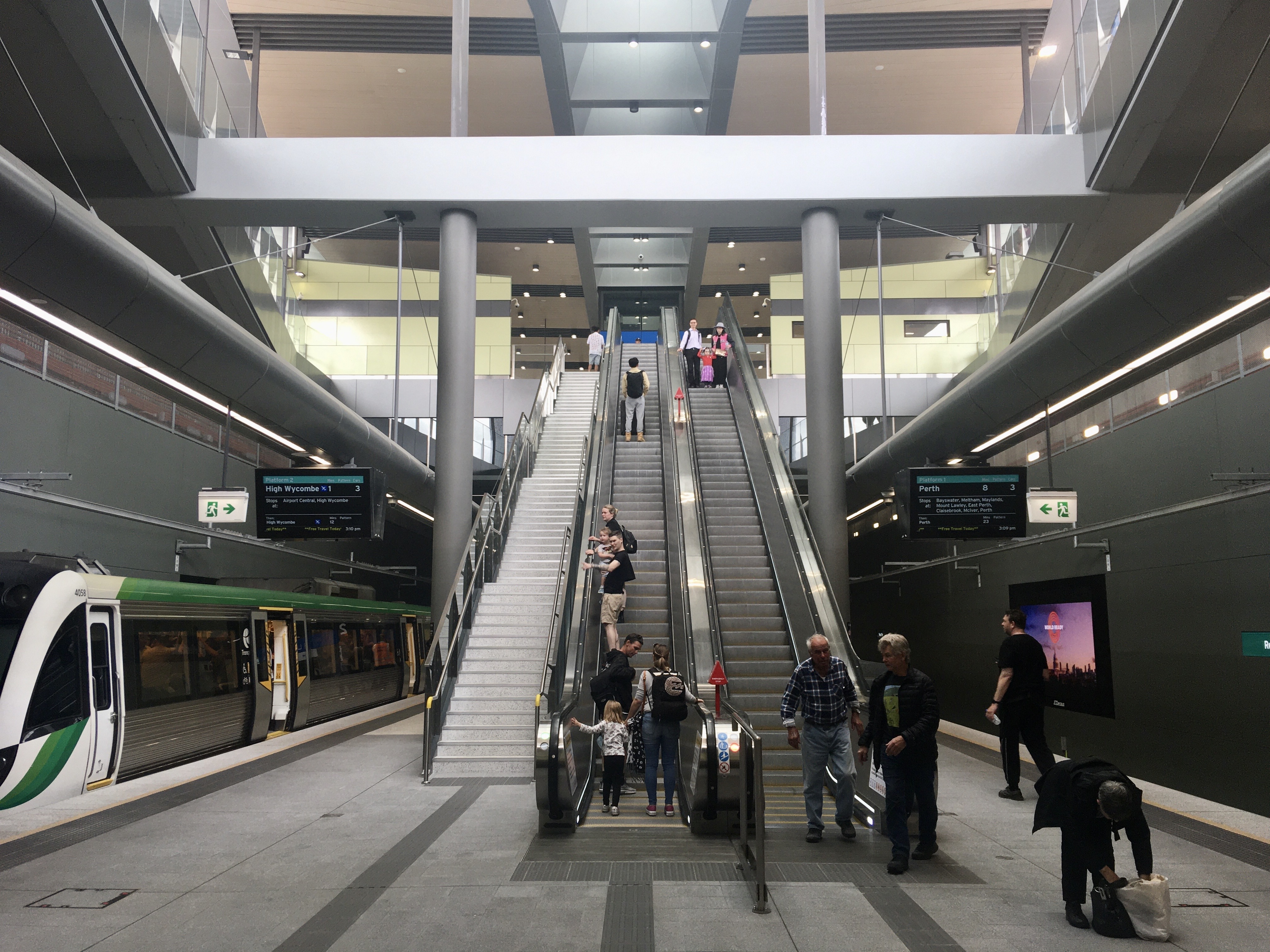
- Escalators viewed from the station platform level, October 2022

General information
- Location: Dunreath Drive, Redcliffe; Western Australia; Australia
- Coordinates: 31°56′01″S 115°56′59″E
- Owner: Public Transport Authority
- Operator: Transperth Train Operations
- Line: Airport line
- Platforms: 1 island platform with 2 platform edges
- Tracks: 2
- Connections: Bus

Construction
- Structure type: Underground
- Parking: Yes
- Accessible: Yes

Other information
- Fare zone: 2

History
- Opened: 9 October 2022

Passengers
- Predicted: 4,100

Services
Preceding station	Transperth	Following station
Bayswater towards Perth or Claremont	Airport line	Airport Central towards High Wycombe
Location
- Location of Redcliffe railway station

Redcliffe railway station is a station for underground commuter rail services in Redcliffe, east of Perth, Western Australia. The station is one of three stations that were built as part of the Forrestfield–Airport Link project and is served by Transperth's Airport line services.

The contract for the Forrestfield–Airport Link, which consists of 8 kilometres (5.0 mi) of twin bored tunnels and three new stations, was awarded to Salini Impregilo and NRW Pty Ltd in April 2016. Forward works, which included the permanent closure of Brearley Avenue between Great Eastern Highway and Dunreath Drive, began in 2016. Construction began in mid-2017, and by June 2018, excavation was complete. The two tunnel boring machines (TBMs) reached the station in mid-2019, having tunnelled from High Wycombe, and left tunnelling towards Bayswater after several weeks of maintenance. Construction of the station infrastructure followed.

Originally planned to open in 2020, the line officially opened on 9 October 2022. It is served by trains every twelve minutes during peak hour and every fifteen minutes outside peak hour and on weekends and public holidays. At night, trains are half-hourly or hourly. The journey to Perth station takes fifteen minutes.

== Description ==
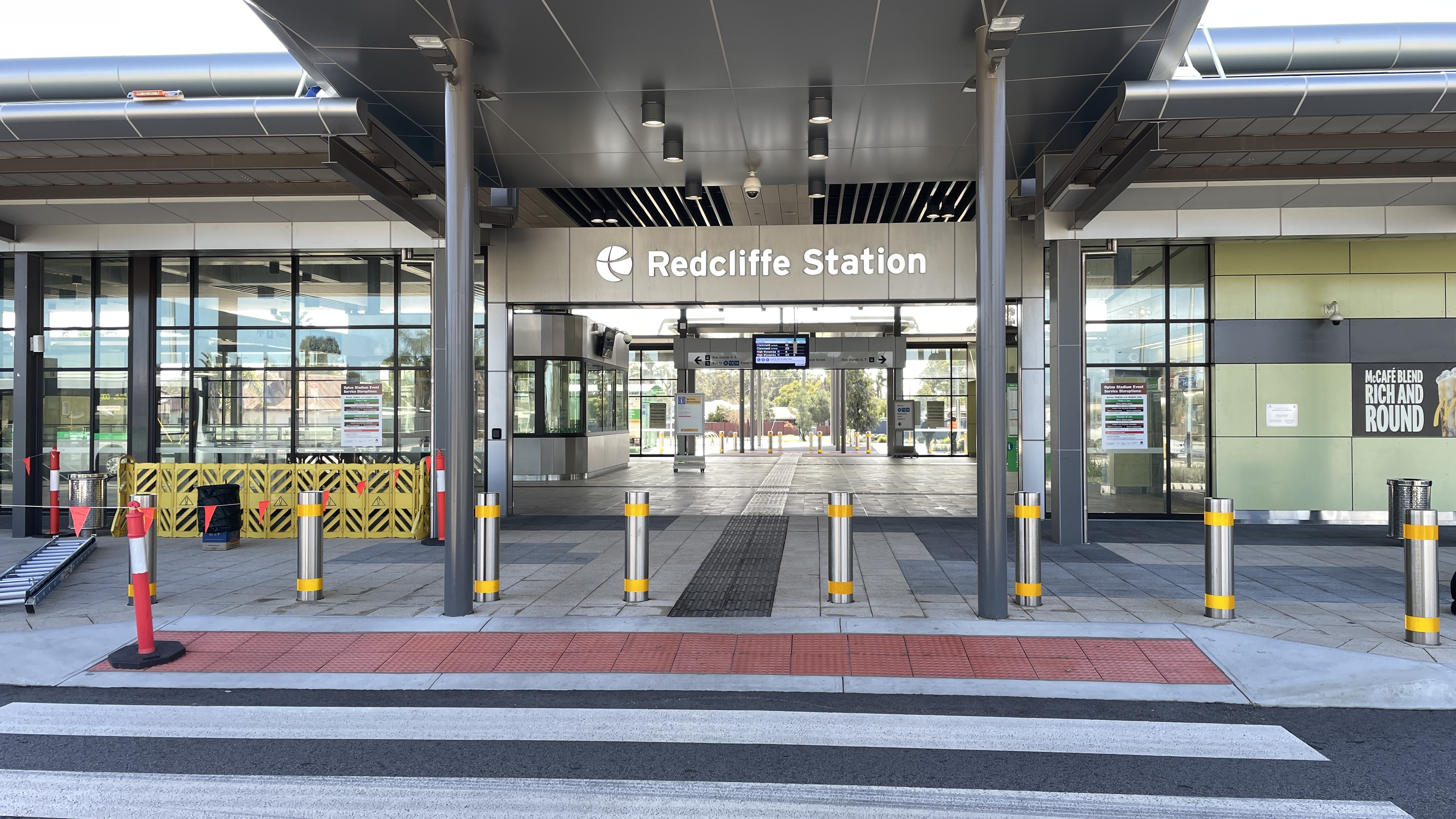
Redcliffe Railway Station Entrance

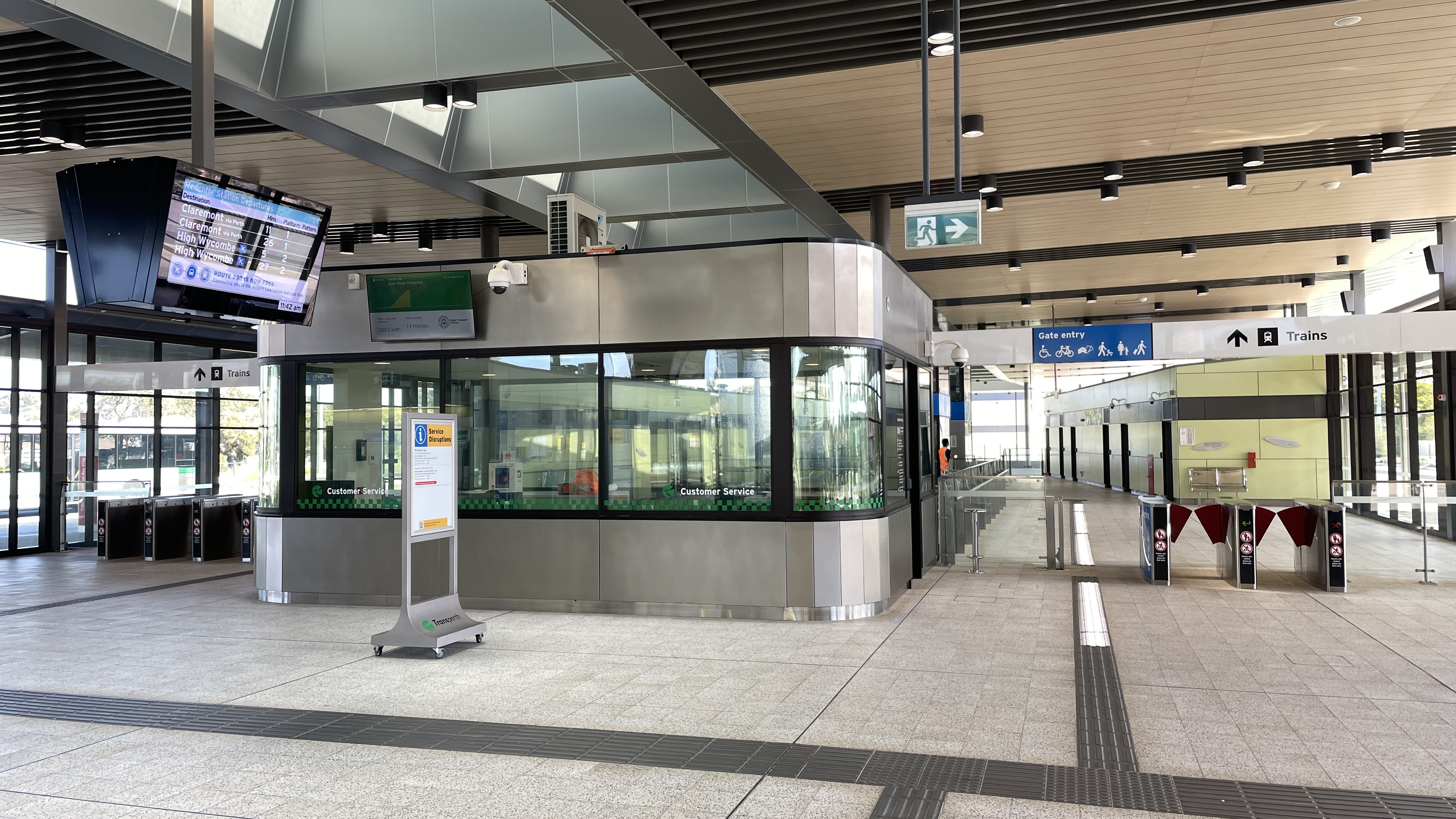
Redcliffe Railway Station Concourse

The station is within the residential area of Redcliffe, about 1 kilometre (0.6 mi) west of terminals three and four of Perth Airport. It is located just to the west of Dunreath Drive on the former Brearley Avenue right of way. It is owned by the Public Transport Authority (PTA), a state government agency, and is part of the Transperth system. The adjacent station to the north-west is Bayswater station, where the Airport line links with the Midland line. The adjacent station to the south-east is Airport Central station, which services terminals one and two of Perth Airport. The station's distance to terminals three and four has been criticised, with it being justified by there being plans for the relocation of Qantas to the Airport Central precinct from 2031.

The station consists of a single underground island platform with two platform edges. The platform is 150 metres (490 ft) long, or long enough for a Transperth six-car train, the longest trains used on the network. Access to the platform is provided by stairs, lifts, and escalators, making the station fully accessible. On the surface are toilets, a kiosk, a customer service office and staff facilities. Surrounding the station building is a bus interchange with six bus bays. There are also drop-off bays nearby and a 500-bay car park approximately 400 metres (1,300 ft) south. The station design has been described as similar to Elizabeth Quay station.

== History ==
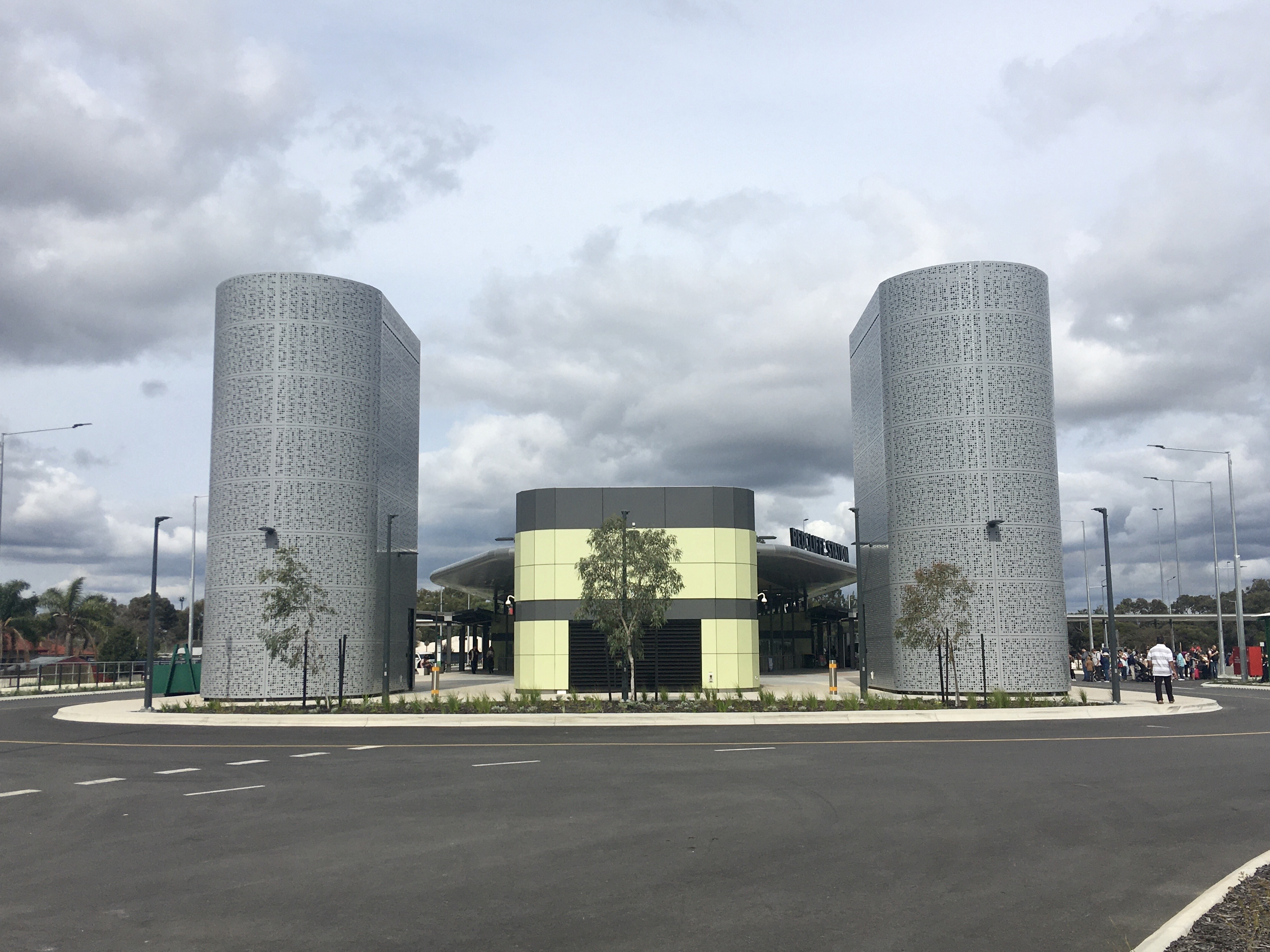
Redcliffe station exterior

During initial planning, the station was called Airport West station as it was located nearer to Perth Airport terminals three and four. The Forrestfield–Airport Link Project Definition Plan, released in August 2014, had the station located in the residential area of Redcliffe instead of in the airport. As such, the station was renamed Belmont station in April 2016 upon the awarding of the main contract. The name came from the adjacent suburb of the same name. For the most part, the Forrestfield–Airport Link project came under one contract, worth A$1.176 billion and awarded to Salini Impregilo and NRW Pty Ltd. This included the construction of the tunnels and three stations, including Belmont station. At the time, the station was expected to be in operation by 2020.

The station was planned to be constructed over the Brearley Avenue right of way, requiring the permanent closure of that road between Great Eastern Highway and Dunreath Drive. At the time, the road was one of the main entrances to Perth Airport, and so nearby roads had to be upgraded to cope with the road's closure. A $4.8 million contract for that was awarded to MACA Civil Pty Ltd in March 2016. Other forward works occurred throughout 2016, including a drain realignment. Brearley Avenue closed on 17 January 2017, and the contractors took site possession in February 2017. Early works began in April 2017.

The government faced calls for the station to be renamed Redcliffe to reflect its actual location. In July 2017, the City of Belmont voted unanimously in support for the name change. The state government launched a survey in October 2017 to decide whether to call it Belmont or Redcliffe station. 81 percent of the 852 respondents voted for Redcliffe, and so the station was renamed in December 2017.

In June 2017, the station's design was revealed. Weston Williamson and GHD Woodhead had been appointed by the contractors as the designers for the three stations. Construction of the station began in mid-2017. By the end of the year, the station's diaphragm walls were complete. Excavation started on 8 February 2018 and was completed by June, whereupon waterproofing of the station commenced. That was completed by August 2018, and so construction of the base slab followed. Nine concrete pours were required for that, which took place over the remainder of 2018.

The first few months of 2019 were used to prepare for the arrival of the two tunnel boring machines (TBMs). A crane was installed for the delivery of tunnel segments for the final portion of tunnelling between Redcliffe and Bayswater. The first TBM, Grace, arrived at Redcliffe station on 9 May 2019, having tunnelled there from High Wycombe. After several weeks for maintenance, the TBM left the station bound for Bayswater on 14 June. Sandy, the second tunnel boring machine, arrived at the station on 6 July 2019. Sandy left the station in early August, allowing the commencement of construction for station infrastructure, including the platform and a mezzanine level.

On 18 December 2018, Transport Minister Rita Saffioti announced the opening date of the project had been delayed from 2020 to 2021. In May 2021, she announced that the project had been delayed again, this time with the opening date being in the first half of 2022. Following the state budget on 12 May 2022, the government changed its position on the line's opening date, saying the line will open some time later in the year. On 16 August, the opening date was revealed to be 9 October 2022, which is when the station did open. The new bus services to Redcliffe station commenced the following day.

== Services ==
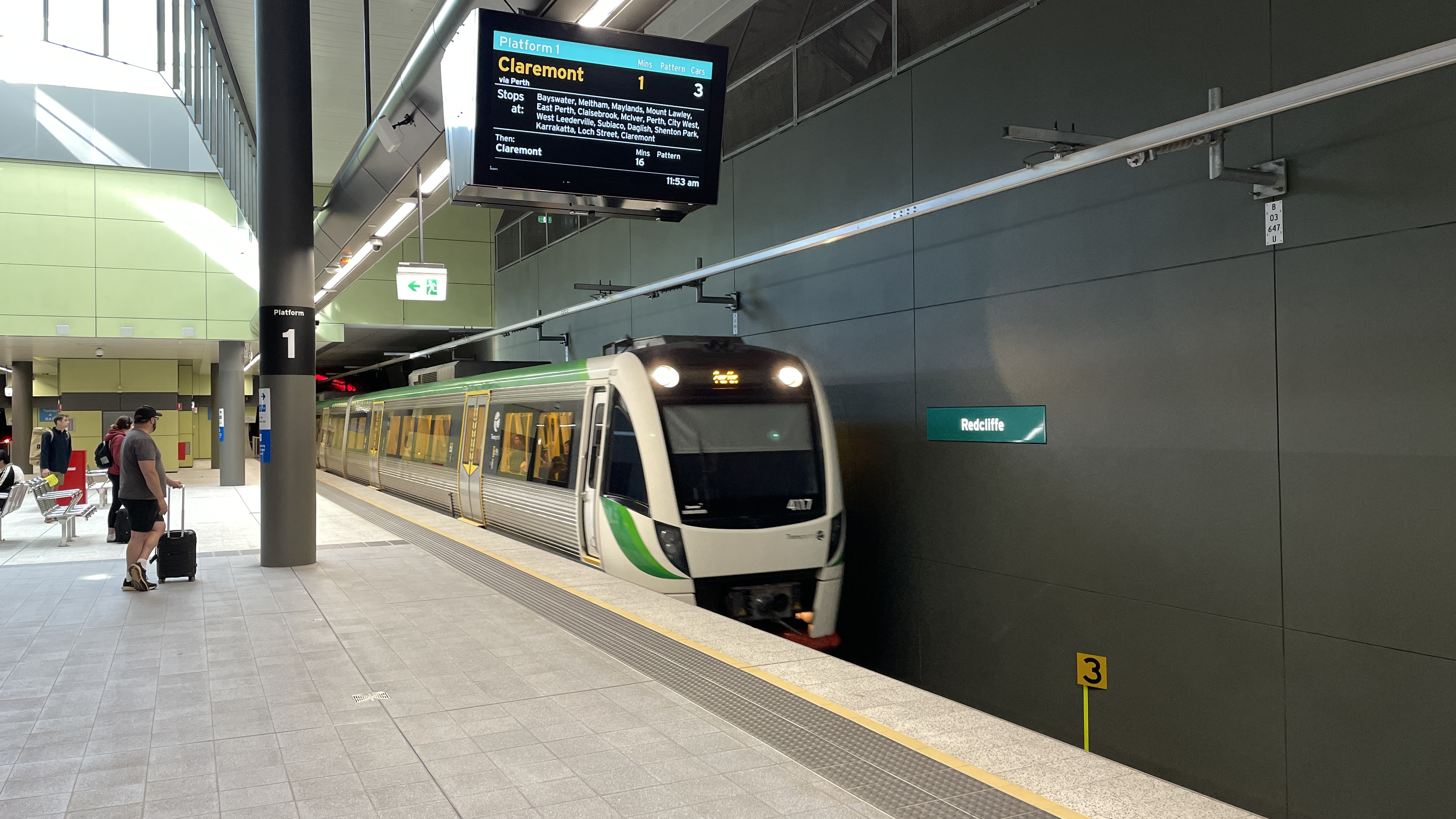
Transperth B-series train on Platform 1

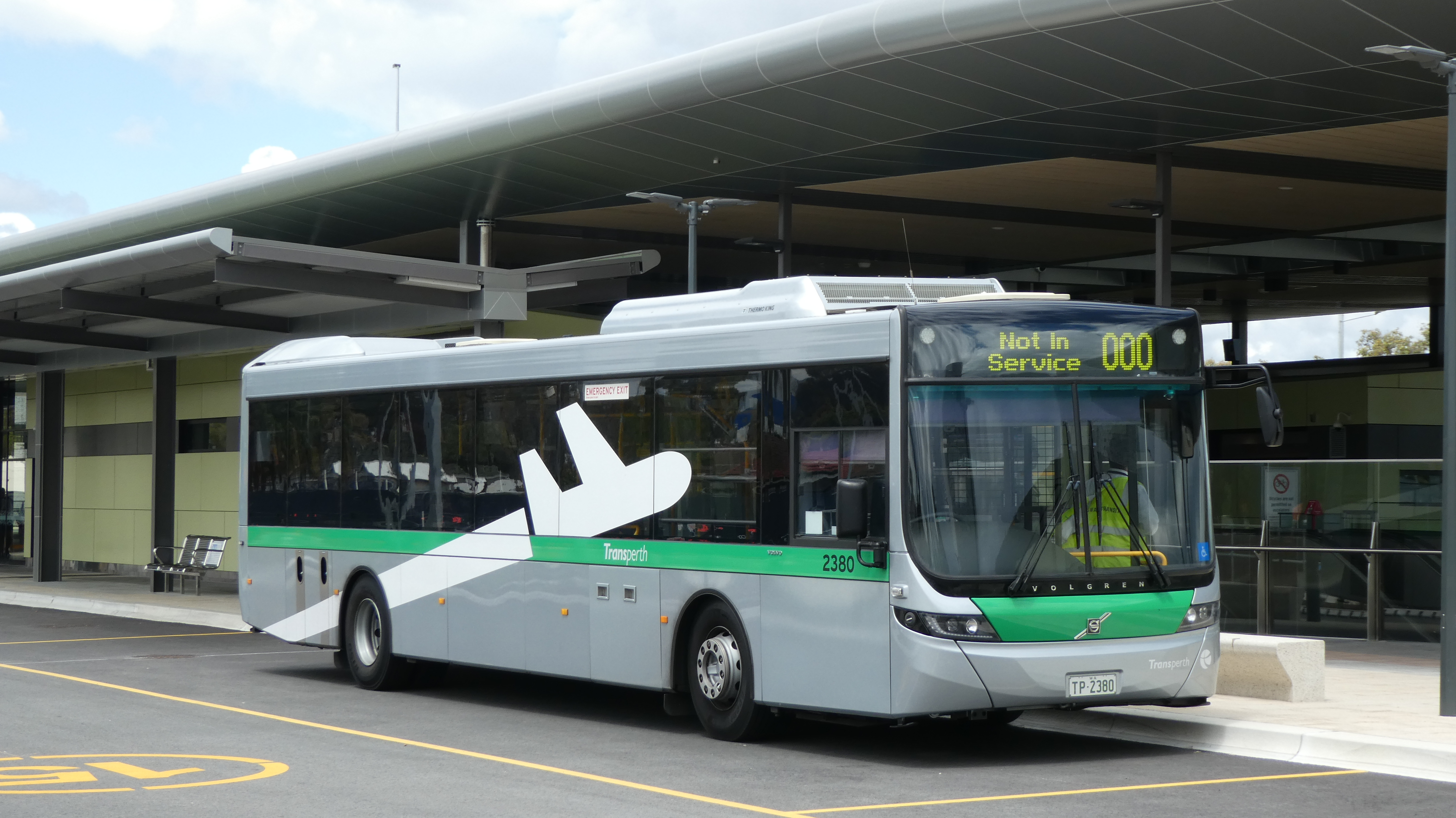
Bus at the Redcliffe station bus interchange

=== Train services ===
Redcliffe station is served by the Airport line on the Transperth network. These services are operated by Transperth Train Operations, a division of the PTA. To the east, the line goes two stations to High Wycombe station. To the west, the line joins the Midland line one station along at Bayswater, running alongside that line to Perth station, before running alongside the Fremantle line, terminating at Claremont station. Airport line trains stop at the station every twelve minutes during peak hour on weekdays and every fifteen minutes outside peak hour and on weekends and public holidays. At night, trains are half-hourly or hourly. The station is predicted to have average daily boardings of 4,100, rising to 6,000 in 2031. The journey to Perth station takes fifteen minutes. The station is in fare zone two, and there is no surcharge.

==== Platforms ====
Redcliffe platform arrangement
Stop ID	Platform	Line	Service Pattern	Destination	Via	Notes
99541	1	Airport line	All stations	Claremont	Perth	
99541	1	Airport line	P	Perth		
99542	2	Airport line	All stations, P	High Wycombe		

=== Bus routes ===
Redcliffe station has a bus interchange with seven stands and seven regular bus routes. Route 39 runs to Elizabeth Quay bus station via Belmont Forum Shopping Centre. Routes 290 and 291 go to Midland station via Guildford and South Guildford. Route 292 is a short loop which goes to terminals three and four. Route 935 is a high frequency route which runs to Kings Park via Belmont Forum Shopping Centre and the Perth central business district. Route 940 is a high frequency route which runs to Elizabeth Quay bus station via Great Eastern Highway. Rail replacement bus services operate as route 902.
