= Edward Golding =

Edward Golding may refer to:

- Edward Golding (MP), Member of Parliament for Fowey
- Sir Edward Golding, 1st Baronet (d. c. 1656), of the Golding baronets
- Sir Edward Golding, 3rd Baronet (d. 1715), of the Golding baronets

== See also ==
- Edward Goulding, British baron, baronet, businessman and MP
- Golding (surname)
