= Goulding (surname) =

Goulding is an English surname of Old English origin.

== People ==
- Aaron Goulding (born 1982), Australian football player
- Acheson Goulding (1893–1951), Canadian military aviator
- Alfred J. Goulding (1898–1972), Australian-born American film director and screenwriter
- Bobbie Goulding (born 1972), English rugby league football coach and former player
- Cathal Goulding (1923–1998), Chief of Staff of the Irish Republican Army and the Official IRA
- Chris Goulding (born 1988), Australian basketballer
- Darrell Goulding (born 1988), English professional rugby league footballer
- Edmund Goulding (1891–1959), British film writer and director
- Ellie Goulding (born 1986), British singer-songwriter
- Frederick Goulding (1842–1909), British printer of etchings and lithographs
- Grantley Goulding (1874–1947), British athlete
- Heather Goulding, American politician
- Sir Irvine Goulding (1909–2000), British judge
- Jane Goulding (born 1957), retired field hockey player from New Zealand
- Jeff Goulding (born 1984), British footballer
- Julia Goulding (born 1985), British actress
- Marrack Goulding (1936–2010), British diplomat
- Phil G. Goulding (1921–1998), American newspaper reporter
- Ray Goulding (1922–1990), American comedian
- Valerie Goulding (1918–2003), Irish campaigner for disabled people and senator
- Warren Goulding (born 1950), Canadian journalist and author

== See also ==
- Goulding (disambiguation)
- Golding, a surname
- Goldin, a Jewish surname
