= William Goulding (disambiguation) =

William Goulding was an Irish politician.

William Goulding may also refer to:

- William Goulding (cricketer) (1813–1878), English cricketer
- Sir William Goulding, 1st Baronet (1856–1925), Irish businessman and politician
- Sir William Lingard Amphlett Goulding, 2nd Baronet (1883–1935), of the Goulding baronets
- Basil Goulding (William Basil Goulding, 1909–1982), Irish cricketer, squash player, art collector and businessman
- Sir (William) Lingard Walter Goulding, 4th Baronet (born 1940), of the Goulding baronets

== See also ==
- Goulding (surname)
