= John Martin Crawford =

Canadian serial killer

- Born: John Martin Crawford; March 29, 1962; Steinbach, Manitoba, Canada
- Died: December 16, 2020 (aged 58); Regional Psychiatric Centre, Saskatoon, Saskatchewan, Canada
- Other name: The Lady Killer
- Convictions: First degree murder Second degree murder (2 counts); Manslaughter
- Penalty: Life imprisonment

Details
- Victims: 4+
- Span of crimes: 1981–1992
- Country: Canada
- Date apprehended: 1993
- Imprisoned at: Regional Psychiatric Centre

John Martin Crawford (March 29, 1962 – December 16, 2020) was a Canadian serial killer. Crawford was convicted of killing four women in Saskatchewan and Alberta, between 1981 and 1992.

== Early life ==
He was born in Steinbach, Manitoba in 1961 to a single mother. His mother remarried in 1964 and the family moved to Vancouver, British Columbia, with Crawford's sister being born shortly after the relocation. Crawford struggled early in life; he frequently ran away from home starting at the age of three, his kindergarten teacher said that he was "stupid," and he failed grade one and had to repeat the grade. His parents were both addicted to gambling, and his step-father was an alcoholic. Crawford himself began sniffing glue at the age of 12. As a teenager he began using other drugs such as marijuana, LSD, hallucinogenic mushrooms, and prescription drugs.

== Crimes ==
Crawford was sentenced in 1981 to ten years' imprisonment for manslaughter in the killing of Mary Jane Serloin, in Lethbridge, Alberta. He was released from prison in 1989.

While under police surveillance, Crawford sexually assaulted Theresa Kematch, who was herself arrested, while Crawford was not.

In October 1994, a farmer came across the remains of three women in heavy brush outside of Saskatoon, Saskatchewan. In 1996, Crawford was convicted of one count of first degree murder and two counts of second-degree murder in the 1992 deaths of three Indigenous women identified as Eva Taysup, Shelley Napope, and Calinda Waterhen. Crawford was sentenced to three concurrent life sentences.

== Popular culture ==
=== Literature ===
Crawford is discussed in Warren Goulding's book Just Another Indian, A Serial Killer and Canada's Indifference with the message that crimes against marginalized minorities go unheeded by an uncaring society at large. The theory is posited that Crawford's case was played down by the media because his victims were Aboriginal women. The story of the last three victims, identified under pseudonyms, was the subject of season 4 episode 14 of the true crime TV show ”Exhibit A”.

== Death ==
Crawford died on December 16, 2020, while serving his sentence at the Regional Psychiatric Centre in Saskatoon. No cause of death was released.

== See also ==
- List of serial killers by country
