= Goulding =

Goulding may refer to:

- Goulding (surname), including a list of people with the name
- Goulding Chemicals, supplier of agricultural fertilisers and industrial chemicals to the Irish market
- Goulding, Florida, a census-designated place (CDP) in Escambia County, Florida, United States
- Goulding's Trading Post, a lodge, trading post, and museum located just north of the Arizona–Utah border

== See also ==
- Golding (disambiguation)
