= Charles Golding =

Charles Golding may refer to:

- Charles Golding (broadcaster), for LBC
- Sir Charles Golding, 2nd Baronet (c. 1624–1661) of the Golding Baronets
- Charles Golding, character in Tender Is the Night (film)
