= William Golden =

William Golden may refer to:

- William Golden (graphic designer) (1911–1959), American graphic designer
- William Lee Golden (born 1939), American country music singer
- William A. Golden, American politician in Georgia
- William B. Golden (born 1948), American attorney and politician in Massachusetts
- William T. Golden (1909–2007), American investment banker, philanthropist and science adviser

== See also ==
- William Golding (disambiguation)
