= John Golding =

John Golding may refer to:

- John Golding (art historian) (1929–2012), British artist, art scholar, and curator
- John Golding (British politician) (1931–1999), British politician and activist
- John Anthony Golding (1920–2012), administrator of the Turks and Caicos Islands
- John Golding (surgeon), British orthopaedic surgeon
- Jon Golding (born 1982), British rugby player
- John Golden (pirate) or Golding (died 1694), English pirate and privateer
