= Redcliffe, Western Australia =

Redcliffe
- Suburb
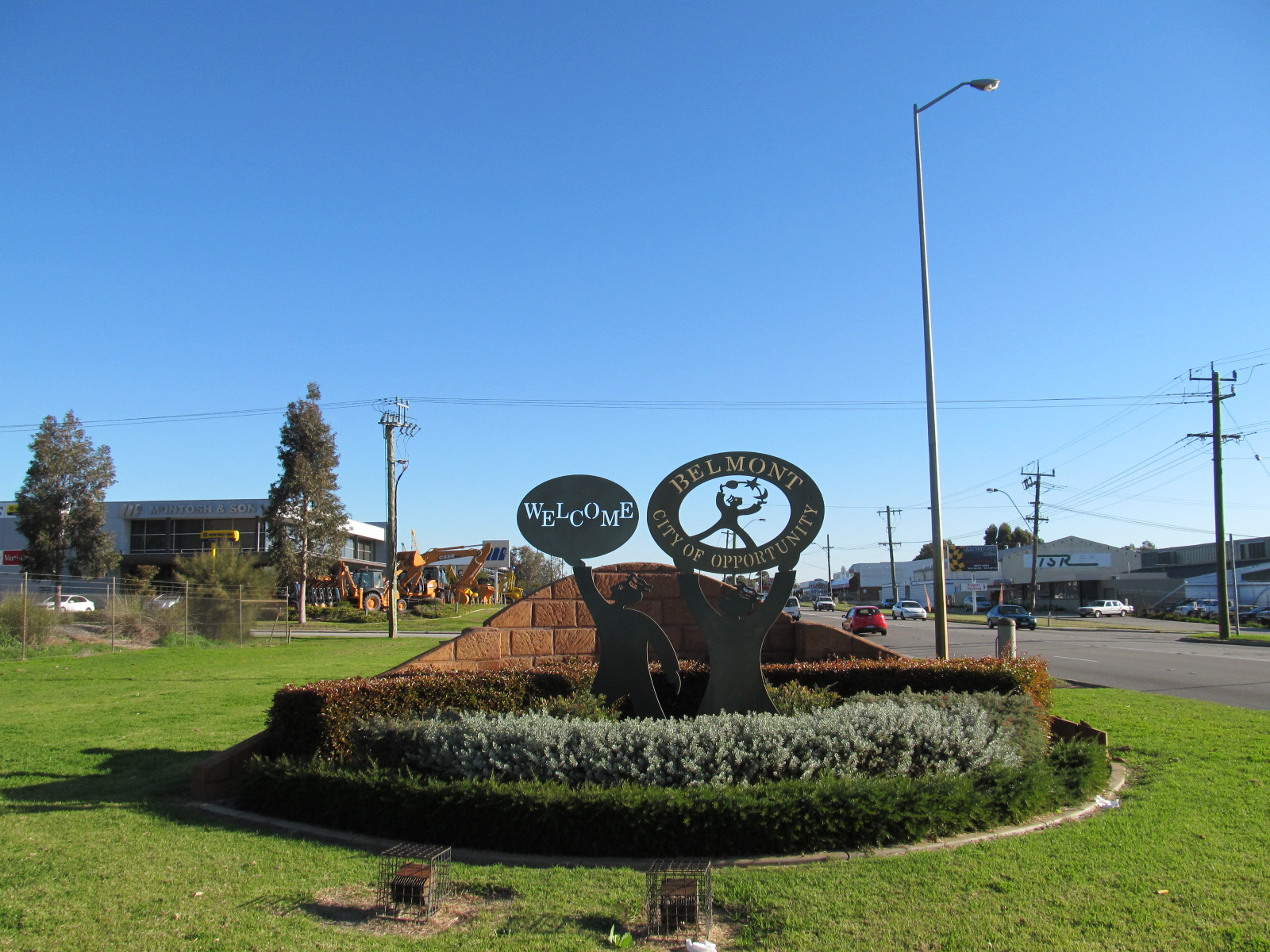
- Welcome monument, City of Belmont, Great Eastern Highway, Redcliffe
- Interactive map of Redcliffe
- Coordinates: 31.938°S 115.940°E
- Country: Australia
- State: Western Australia
- City: Perth
- LGA: City of Belmont

Government
  - State electorate: Belmont
  - Federal division: Swan

Population
  - Total: 5,030 (SAL 2021)
- Postcode: 6104
Suburbs around Redcliffe
Ascot	Ascot	South Guildford
Ascot	Redcliffe	Perth Airport
Belmont	Cloverdale	Perth Airport

Redcliffe is a suburb of Perth, Western Australia, located in the City of Belmont local government area.

The boundaries of the suburb are determined by the Great Eastern Highway, Tonkin Highway and Epsom Avenue, Belmont, and the grounds of the Perth Airport which lie on the eastern edge of the suburb.

The story of its name is ambiguous: while some claim it was named after steep red clay deposits that lined the banks of the Swan River when settlers first arrived, others claim that it was named after the ancestral home of an early settler. The suburb was once a single property near modern-day Water Street and the main house, "Nulsen Haven" still stands today. The local primary school was built in 1908 and at this time, Redcliffe had been transformed from one property into many small farms after being subdivided in 1897.

Modern Redcliffe is a mix of residential, semi-industrial and retail buildings. It is 18 minutes from the Perth central business district and a short walk from the Swan River.

== Transport ==
Redcliffe was previously only served by Transperth bus routes 39 between its terminus on Grand Parade and Elizabeth Quay bus station, and the high frequency route 935 between Perth Airport and Kings Park via the Belmont Forum shopping centre and Perth City, along with several other routes operating along the Great Eastern Highway.

In October 2022, the Redcliffe railway station opened as part of the Airport line. The station provides a rail link to High Wycombe to the east via Perth Airport, and Claremont station to the west via Perth. It also resulted in changes for bus routes in the area. Route 935 was changed to terminate at Redcliffe station instead of Perth Airport, while also operating a more direct route along Stanton Road instead of Johnson Street and Treffone Street. Route 39 was extended to operate to the railway station, serving the aforementioned streets instead of the 935. A new high frequency route, the 940, travels directly to the Perth CBD via the Great Eastern Highway along the north part of the suburb. Route 293 travels to High Wycombe railway station and provided a connection between Stanton Road and Great Eastern Highway via Epsom Avenue. Other services to the Redcliffe station include the 290 and 291, which connect to Midland railway station, and the 292, which operates as a circular route to the Perth Airport Terminals 3 & 4 from Redcliffe Station to replace routes which previously travelled to the Airport such as the 935. This route is usually operated by buses equipped with luggage racks for passenger convenience.

=== Bus ===
Redcliffe is served by these Transperth bus routes:

- 39 Redcliffe station to Elizabeth Quay bus station – serves Second Street, Stanton Road, Morrison Street, Treffone Street, Towton Street, Johnson Street and Epsom Avenue
- 290 and 291 Redcliffe station to Midland station – serve Dunreath Drive, Fauntleroy Avenue and Great Eastern Highway
- 292 Redcliffe station to Redcliffe station – Circular Route, serves Dunreath Drive
- 293 Redcliffe station to High Wycombe station – serves Second Street, Stanton Road and Epsom Avenue
- 935 Redcliffe station to Kings Park (high frequency) – serves Second Street, Stanton Road and Epsom Avenue
- 940 Redcliffe station to Elizabeth Quay bus station (high frequency) – serves Dunreath Drive, Fauntleroy Avenue and Great Eastern Highway

=== Rail ===
- Airport Line
  - Redcliffe station
