= Warren Goulding =

Canadian journalist and author (born 1950)

Warren Goulding (born 1950) is a Canadian journalist and author. He wrote Just Another Indian, A Serial Killer and Canada's Indifference, which is about the less-than-notorious serial killer John Martin Crawford. The book was given the award for "best non-fiction book of the year" at the Saskatchewan Book Awards.

Goulding's main thesis in the work is that crimes committed against native Indians in Canada are ignored by an uncaring society at large. The theory is posited that Crawford's case was played down by the media because his victims were Native American/First Nations prostitutes.
