= Goldin =

Goldin is a Jewish matronymic surname derived from the Jewish feminine name Golda. In Russian the surnames may be spelled either Гольдин or Голдин. Russian feminine form: Goldina. Notable people with the surname include:

- Alexander Goldin (born 1964), Russian chess player
- Amy Goldin (1926–1978), American art critic
- Barry Goldin (born 1978), British racing driver
- Brett Goldin (1977–2006), South African actor
- Claudia Goldin (born 1946), American economist
- Daniel Goldin (born 1940), American administrator
- Gayle Goldin (born 1971), American politician
- Godfrey Goldin (1919–1943), Australian rules footballer
- Harrison J. Goldin (born 1936), American politician
- Horace Goldin (1873–1939), British magician
- Hyman Goldin (1881–1972), American writer
- Ian Goldin (born 1955), South African economist
- Ken Goldin (born 1965), American entrepreneur
- Maria Goldina (1899–1970), Soviet and Russian singer and educator
- Nan Goldin (born 1953), American photographer
- Rebecca Goldin, American mathematician
- Ricky Paull Goldin (born 1965), American actor
- Rimma Goldina (born 1941), Soviet and Russian archeologist
- Sergey Goldin (1936–2007), Russian scientist
- Sidney M. Goldin (1880–1937), American filmmaker
- Stephen Goldin (born 1947), American writer
- Theodore W. Goldin (1858–1935), American soldier
- Vladislav Goldin (born 2001), Russian basketball player

== See also ==
- Goldin Finance 117, a building in Tianjin, China
- The Goldin Institute, a nonprofit in Chicago, Illinois
- Golden (name)
- Golding (surname)
