= Sergey Goldin =

- Born: 28 January 1936; Leningrad, USSR
- Died: 18 May 2007 (aged 71); Novosibirsk, Russia
- Citizenship: Soviet Union → Russia
- Known for: Introduction in seismology the mesostructers
- Awards: State Prize of the Russian Federation (1998); Order of Friendship (2006)

Academic background
- Education: Leningrad Mining Institute
- Thesis: Kinematic interpretation of the reflected seismic waves (the theory and algorithms) (1979)

Academic work
- Discipline: Geophysics
- Institutions: Russian Academy of Sciences (Novosibirsk)

Dr Sergey Vasilyevich Goldin (28 January 1936 – 18 May 2007) was a Soviet and Russian geophysicist, Academician of RAS, member of European Academy of Science and American Geophysical Union, director of Institute of Geophysics in Sibiria Branch of RAS (1996- 2004).

== Biography ==
In 1953, S. Goldin has completed secondary school in Vologda with a silver medal award. In the same year he has arrived on geophysical faculty of the Leningrad Mining Institute which has ended in 1958 with the high distinction. In the next three years he was employed in field geological parties in Kolpashevo, Surgut and Berezovo (all in Siberia), participated in the opening of an oil deposit near to Surgut.

In 1961, S. Goldin has arrived in postgraduate study of Institute of Geology and Geophysics SB of AS USSR. Since 1964, he was the research assistant of the Institute. In 1966, he has defended the PhD thesis of physical and mathematical sciences on the theme of «The Noise stability of algorithms of phase correlation of seismic waves against disturbances».

In 1965, S. Goldin has lived to Tyumen and had headed to laboratory of mathematical processing of Western-Siberian scientifically - research geology-prospecting oil institute. In this time he has started to teach at the Tyumen industrial institute.

In 1970, S. Goldin has come back to Novosibirsk, had headed laboratory of mathematical methods of geophysics in the Institute of geology and geophysics of SB AS USSR.

In 1979 he has defended the thesis for a doctor's degree (on physical and mathematical sciences), with a theme «Kinematic interpretation of the reflected seismic waves (the theory and algorithms)».

Since 1971, S. Goldin taught on chair of geophysics of Novosibirsk State University (NSU). In 1983 S.V.Goldinu appropriates a rank of the professor, since 1990, he supervised over chair of geophysics in NSU. In 1991 he has been selected by member-correspondent of the AS USSR, and in 1997 - the full member of the Russian Academy of Sciences.

Within 1996 to 2004, S. V.Goldin has been selected as director of Institute of geophysics of the Siberian Branch of the Russian Academy of Science.

== Scientific achievements ==
He was author of more than 200 scientific publication, among which were 4 monographs.

Among his pupils are three doctors and 25 holders of PhD of science.

S. V. Goldin possesses among others, the theory of the seismic migration allowing quantitatively to compare various algorithms of construction of the plotting of medium and to synthesise algorithms with set properties.

Last years the scientist dealt with problems of geophysics new to: experimental and theoretical studying of the nonlinear effects bound to diffusion of seismic waves in heterogenous mediums, studying of physical processes in the seismic source and the forecast of earthquakes.

In the beginning of 2000-th years, S. V.Goldin has offered the new concept of geophysical and geodynamic monitoring of the seismoawake regions, embodying strategy of the short-term forecast of earthquakes offered it earlier. The essence of new strategy consisted in priority conduction to researches from search for earthquake tremors on studying of the geomechanical and physical processes descending in concrete blocks massives in the place of source.

At the last years of his life, he has put forward essentially new geodynamic problems of the physical processes descending in the seismic source in the course of prediction of earthquake, during time and after its realisation. According to this theory, in the source a series accommodation processes which allow medium "to adapt (to any limen)" to increasing loads and in which such specific properties of block mediums, as ability to repacking, to quasiplastic flow, to dilatant strengthening, and also the phenomenon of dynamic convertibility of dilatancy, leading to formation of mesostrictures in source earthquake areas are awakely displayed educes.

He died on 18 May 2007 after a serious illness, and is buried at the Cherbuzinskoye Cemetery in Novosibirsk.

== Awards and honors ==
- State Prize of the Russian Federation (1998)
- Order of Friendship (2006)

== Bibliography ==
- S. V. Goldin Seismic traveltime inversion: Investigations in geophysics. SEG, Tulsa, 1986, Vol.1. - 363 p. - ISBN 9780931830389
- S. V. Goldin Introduction to geometry seysmics: - Novosibirsk: NSU, 2005. - 263 p - ISBN 5-94356-295-8 (rus).
- Estimation of the Parameters of an Imminent Seismic Event Focus by the Free Surface Strains/ Gol'din S.V., Kozlova M.P., Nazarov L.A., Nazarova L.A.//Journal of Mining Science. 2007. V. 43. № 3. pp. 237–246
- Mitrofanov G., Glebov A., Goldin S. Some Nonlinear Effects Observed in Seismic Examples./ In: Society of Petroleum Engineers, 68th European Association of Geoscientists and Engineers Conference and Exhibition, incorporating SPE EUROPEC 2006, EAGE 2006: Opportunities in Mature Areas Vienna, 2006. С. 2503-2507.
