= Weston Williamson =

British architectural firm

WestonWilliamson+Partners (WW+P)
- Type: Limited Liability Partnership
- Industry: Architecture
- Headquarters: London, Manchester, Melbourne, Sydney, Perth, Toronto, Riyadh, Shenzhen and Hong Kong,
- Number of employees: 200+
- Website: https://wwparchitects.com/

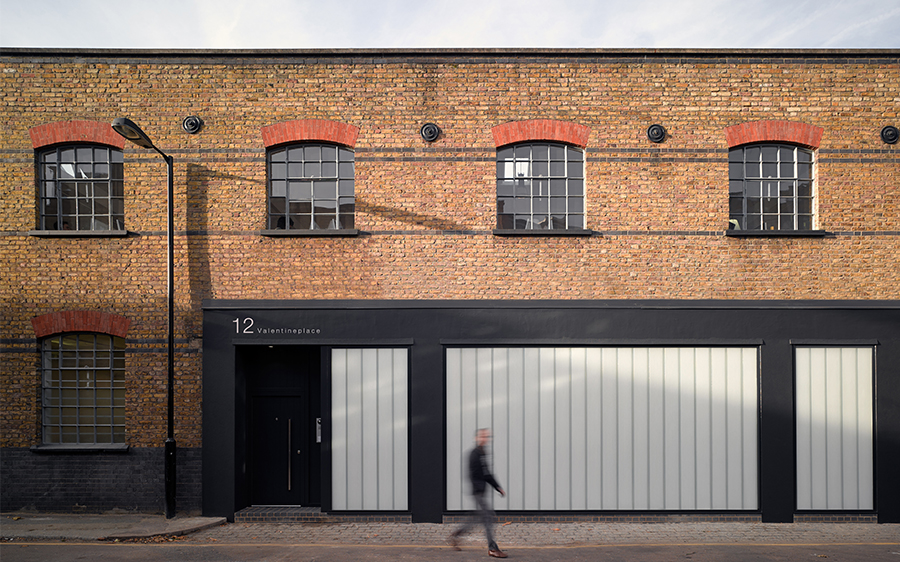
WestonWilliamson+Partners Studio Southwark

Weston Williamson + Partners (WW+P) is a British architectural firm formed in 1985 and based in London, Manchester, Melbourne, Sydney, Perth, Toronto, Riyadh, Shenzhen and Hong Kong.

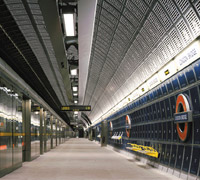
The Jubilee line extension at London Bridge station (2007).

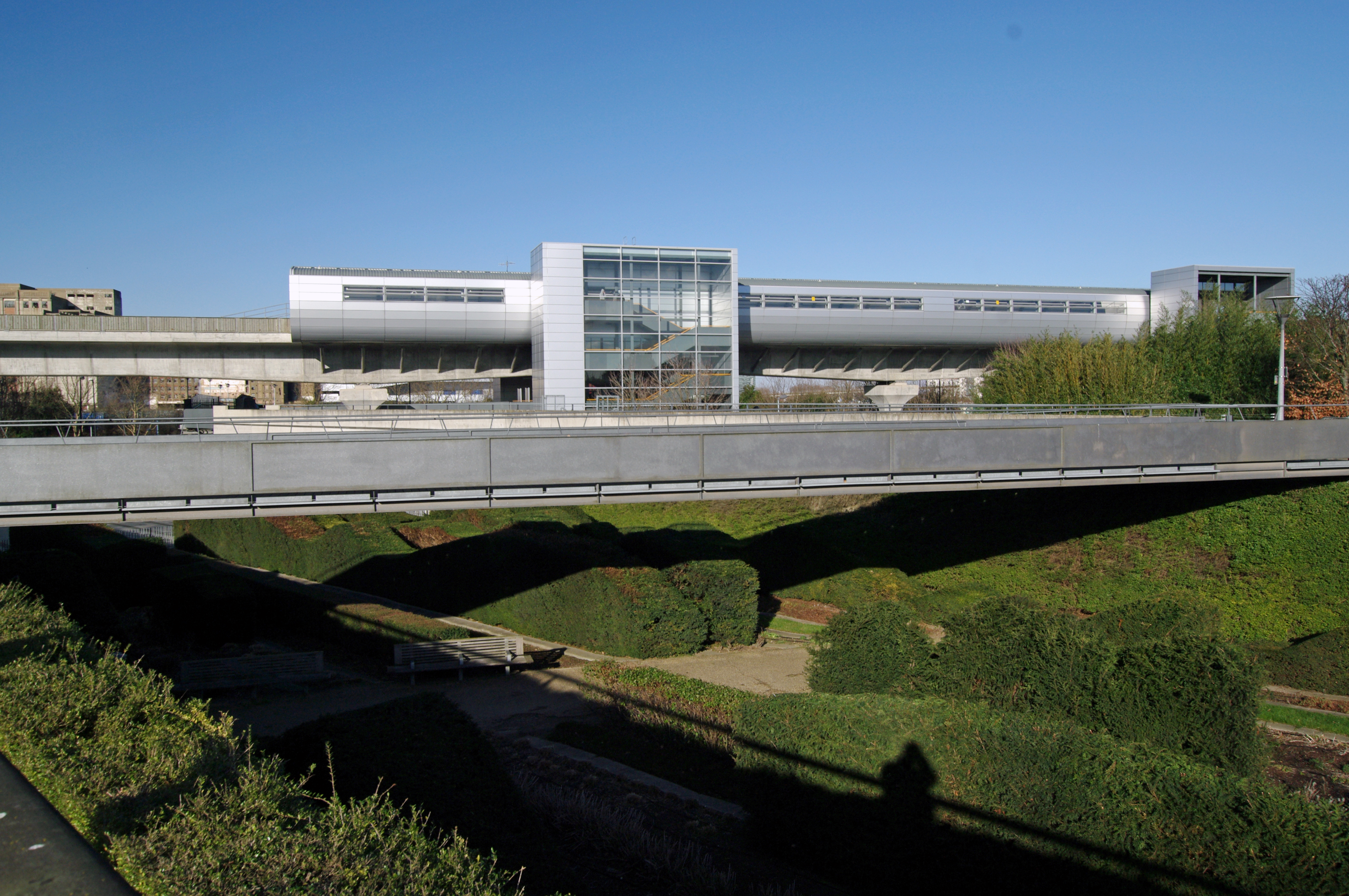
The new extension to the Docklands Light Railway from 2005.

== History ==
Weston Williamson was established in 1985 by Andrew Weston and Chris Williamson, who met whilst studying architecture at Leicester Polytechnic School of Architecture with Steve Humphreys, who joined the practice in 1991. In 2008, Rob Naybour became a fourth director.

In 2013 Weston Williamson became an LLP forming WestonWilliamson+Partners with the introduction of nine new partners. In 2022 WestonWilliamson+Partners was acquired by Egis Group, forming part of their Architecture Line.

In July 2024, it was announced that Chris Williamson would be President of the Royal Institute of British Architects, serving for two years from September 2025.

== Projects ==
WestonWilliamson+Partners has worked on a number of projects internationally including schemes for Transport for London such as the Paddington and Woolwich stations on the Elizabeth line, and the Jubilee line extension at London Bridge, projects related to HS2 and the Docklands Light Railway, plus work for Melbourne Metro Rail Authority and the Dubai and Malaysian transport authorities. Other projects include the Oliver Morris House in Brixton, and the New England Biolabs laboratories in Boston.

- Melbourne Metro Tunnel
- Paddington and Woolwich Elizabeth line stations
- Paddington Integrated Project
- Docklands Light Railway Extension to London City Airport
- Docklands Light Railway Extension to Woolwich
- East London Line Stations at Hoxton and Dalston Junction railway station
- Jubilee line station at London Bridge
- Pudding Mill Lane Station
- Perth Forrestfield Airport Link
- Paddington Crossrail
- Miami Metromover
- HS2 Old Oak Common
- Barking Riverside Station
