= Richard Golding (engraver) =

English line engraver

Richard Golding (15 August 1785 – 28 December 1865) was an English line engraver.

== Life ==
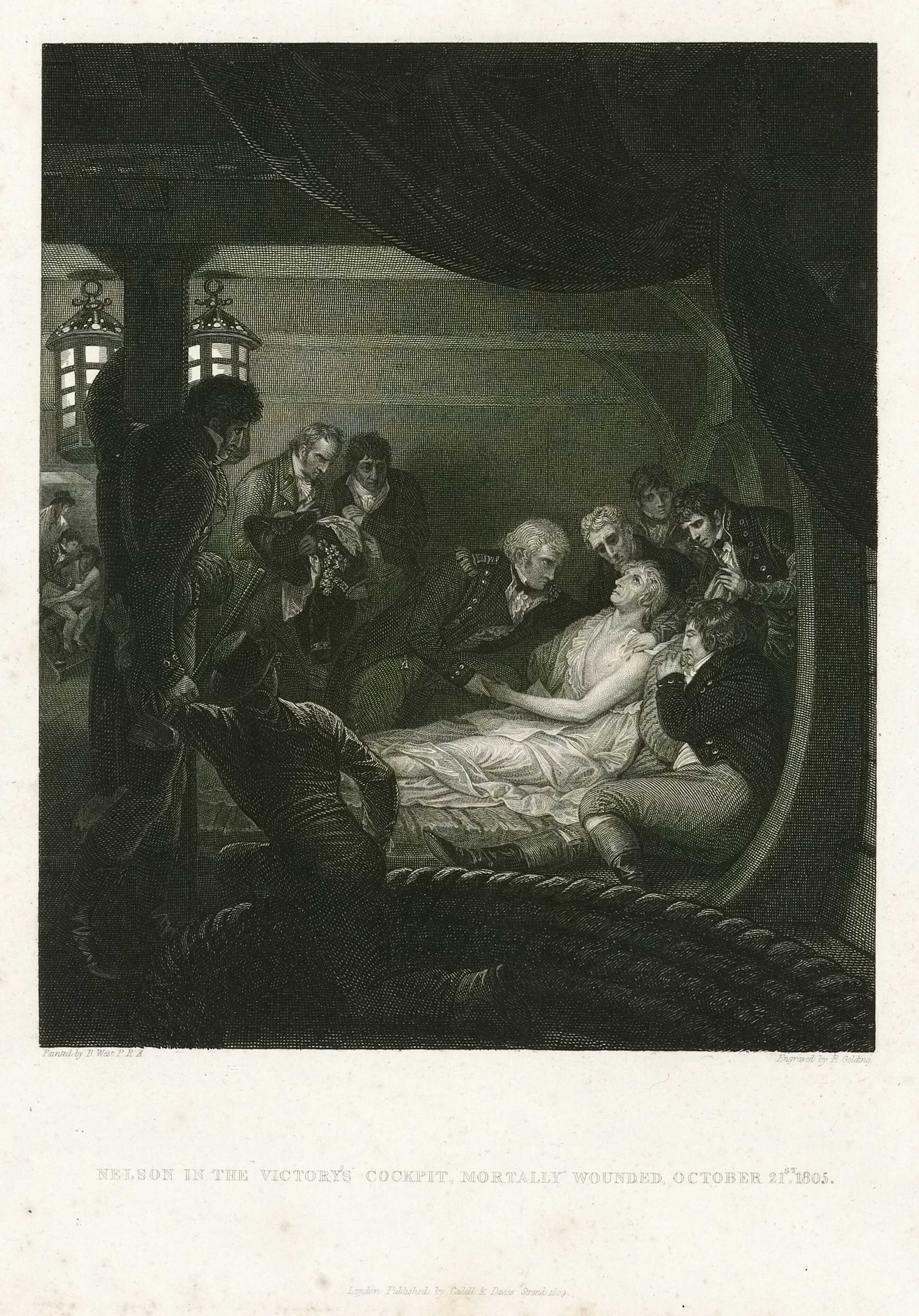
Nelson in The Victory's cockpit, Mortally Wounded October 21st 1805 by Golding, after Benjamin West

Golding was born in London, of humble parentage. He was apprenticed in 1799 to an engraver named Pass, but at the end of five years his indentures were transferred to James Parker, who died in 1805, leaving some unfinished plates, which were completed by his pupil. Golding was afterwards introduced to Benjamin West, who employed him to engrave his painting The Death of Nelson. He then executed a number of book-plates, the best known of which are those after the designs of Robert Smirke for editions of Don Quixote and Gil Blas, and he also assisted William Sharp.

In 1818 he completed a plate of Princess Charlotte of Wales, after the painting by Sir Thomas Lawrence. The reputation which he gained by this plate led to the offer of numerous commissions, and among the portraits which he subsequently engraved were those of Sir William Grant, Master of the Rolls, a full-length after Lawrence, General Sir Harry Calvert, bart., after Thomas Phillips, and Thomas Hammersley the banker, after Hugh Douglas Hamilton, as well as a portrait of Queen Victoria when princess, in her ninth year, after Richard Westall, and another in 1830, after William Fowler. He likewise engraved a large plate of St. Ambrose refusing the Emperor Theodosius Admission into the Church, after the picture by Rubens.

In 1842, after having been without work for several years, he undertook to engrave for the Art Union of Dublin a plate after Daniel Maclise's picture A Peep into Futurity; but he had fallen into a state of desponding indolence, and at the end of ten years it was still unfinished. According to Samuel Redgrave, his powers and eyesight gradually failed, and he withdrew from society, finding recreation only in angling.

Although unmarried, and not without means, he died from bronchitis in neglected and dirty lodgings in Stebbington Street, St Pancras, London, on 28 December 1865. He was buried in Highgate Cemetery; but owing to allegations that he had been poisoned by his medical attendant, who became possessed of the bulk of his property, his body was exhumed in the following September and an inquest held, which, however, terminated in a verdict of "Death from natural causes".
