= Bill Golding =

Australian rules footballer

Personal information
- Full name: Bill Golding
- Born: 14 September 1916
- Died: 4 June 1999 (aged 82)
- Height: 183 cm (6 ft 0 in)
- Weight: 82 kg (181 lb)

Playing career^{1}
Years	Club	Games (Goals)
1942	South Melbourne	3 (3)
- ^{1} Playing statistics correct to the end of 1942.

Bill Golding (14 September 1916 – 4 June 1999) was an Australian rules footballer who played with South Melbourne in the Victorian Football League (VFL).
