= Jon Golding =

English rugby union player

- Born: Jon Golding; 6 May 1982 (age 44) Morpeth, Northumberland
- Height: 1.83 m (6 ft 0 in)
- Weight: 109 kg (17 st 2 lb)
- School: Millfield

Rugby union career
- Position: Prop
- Current team: Newcastle Falcons
Youth career
- Leicester Tigers Academy
Senior career
Years	Team	Apps	(Points)
2002–2004	Northampton	4	(0)
2004–2006	Rotherham		
2006 –	Newcastle	61	(15)
- Correct as of 3 April 2010
International career
Years	Team	Apps	(Points)
2008 –	England Saxons	1	(0)
- Correct as of 9 February 2008

Jon Golding (born 6 May 1982 in Morpeth, Northumberland, England) is a rugby union player for Newcastle Falcons in the RFU Championship, playing at the loose-head prop position.

== Club career ==
He has previously played for Rotherham and Northampton Saints. Golding joined the Newcastle Falcons for the start of the 2006–07 season.

In March 2009, Golding signed a new contract with Newcastle.

== International career ==
He has represented England at under-19 level. Golding made his debut for the England Saxons on 9 February 2008, against Italy A.

After strong form in the early part of the 2009–10 season, Golding was a contender to be in the senior England squad for the 2010 Six Nations Championship. A broken rib sustained against London Wasps kept him out for the duration of the tournament.

Golding was called up to the senior England squad for the 2010 tour of Australia.
