= Golding baronets =

Extinct baronetcy in the Baronetage of England

- Escutcheon of the Golding baronets of Colston Bassett
- Creation date: 1642
- Status: extinct
- Extinction date: 1715

The Golding Baronetcy, of Colston Bassett in the County of Nottingham, was a title in the Baronetage of England. It was created on 27 September 1642 for Edward Golding. The title became extinct on the death of the third Baronet in 1715.

== Golding baronets, of Colston Bassett (1642) ==
- Sir Edward Golding, 1st Baronet (died c. 1656)
- Sir Charles Golding, 2nd Baronet (c. 1624 – 1661)
- Sir Edward Golding, 3rd Baronet (died 1715)
