= NRW Holdings =

Construction and mining contractor in Australia

- Traded as: ASX: NWH
- Industry: Construction; Mining
- Founded: 1994
- Founder: Jeff McGlinn; John Silverthorne
- Headquarters: Perth, Western Australia
- Area served: Queensland; Western Australia
- Key people: Michael Arnett (Chairman); Jules Pemberton (Managing Director)
- Revenue: $2.9 billion (2024)
- Net income: $335 million (2024)
- Number of employees: 7,400 (2024)
- Subsidiaries: See below
- Website: www.nrw.com.au

NRW Holdings is a construction and mining contractor with its headquarters in Perth, Western Australia.

== History ==
NRW Holdings was established in 1994 in Kalgoorlie by Jeff McGlinn and John Silverthorne with its first contract at the Granny Smith Gold Mine. Over the next few years it expanded, gaining further contracts at other gold and iron-ore mines in Western Australia including multiple contracts in the Pilbara for BHP, Fortescue and Rio Tinto. In 1998 it founded a transport division.

In 2007, NRW began its first overseas contract at the Simandou mine in Guinea and was listed on the Australian Securities Exchange. In 2011, it commenced its first coal contract in Queensland. In 2016, a NRW / Salini Impregilo joint venture was awarded the contract to build the Airport railway line in Perth.

== Subsidiaries ==
- Action Drill & Blast - drilling and blast services, established 2010
- AES Equipment Solutions - earthmover equipment repair and maintenance
- DIAB Engineering - maintenance and fabrication services
- Golding Contractors - Queensland civil construction, urban development and mining services contractor acquired in 2017
- NRW Civil & Mining - infrastructure & mining projects
- Primero - engineering services, established in 2011
- RCR Mining Technologies, equipment manufacturer
- OFI Group, electrical innovation & integration
- Fredon Industries Pty Ltd, electrical, HVAC, infrastructure, technology and maintenance services
