= Seaforth railway station =

Railway station in Perth, Western Australia

Seaforth
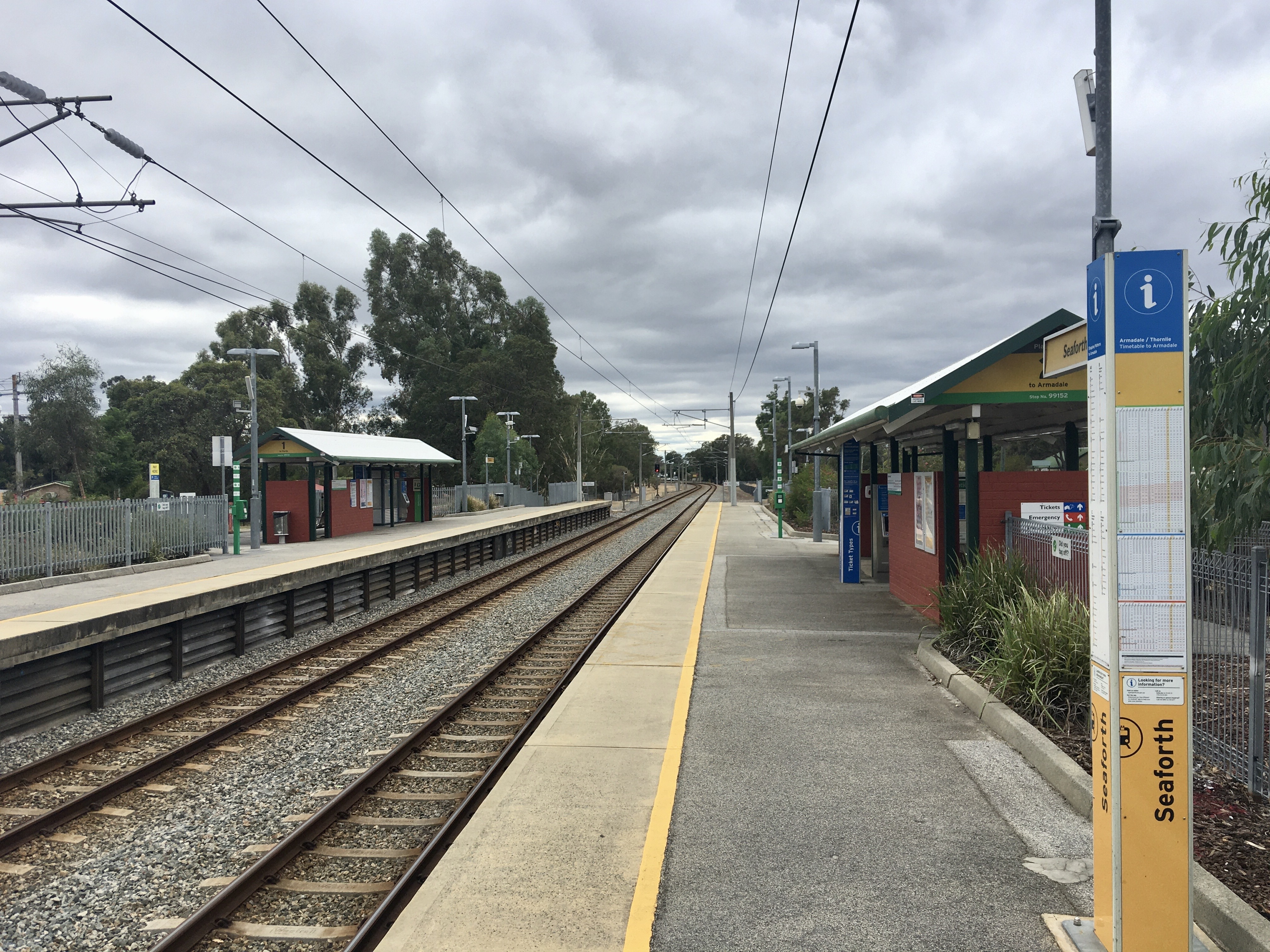
- Seaforth station, April 2022

General information
- Location: Albany Highway & Seaforth Avenue, Gosnells; Western Australia; Australia
- Coordinates: 32°05′05″S 116°00′40″E
- Owner: Public Transport Authority
- Operator: Public Transport Authority
- Line: South Western Railway
- Distance: 22.6 kilometres (14.0 mi) from Perth
- Platforms: 2 side platforms
- Tracks: 2

Construction
- Accessible: Partial

Other information
- Fare zone: 3

History
- Opened: 4 May 1948

Passengers
- 2017: 136 daily

Services
Preceding station	Transperth	Following station
Gosnells towards Perth	Armadale line	Kelmscott towards Byford
Location
- Location of Seaforth station

Seaforth railway station is a suburban railway station in Gosnells, a suburb of Perth, Western Australia. It is on the Armadale line which is part of the Transperth network, and is 22.6 kilometres (14.0 mi) south-west of Perth station and 7.8 kilometres (4.8 mi) north of Armadale station. The station opened on 4 May 1948 with low-level platforms. High-level platforms were added in 1968. The station consists of two side platforms with a pedestrian level crossing. It is not fully accessible due to steep ramps and a lack of tactile paving.

Services are operated by the Public Transport Authority. Peak services reach seven trains per hour in each direction, whilst off-peak services are four trains per hour. The station is one of the least used ones on the Transperth network, with just 136 boardings per day in October 2017. The station was closed for 18 months in November 2023 to facilitate construction of the Victoria Park-Canning Level Crossing Removal and Byford Rail Extension projects.

== Description ==
Seaforth station is along the South Western Railway, which links Perth to Bunbury. The northern 37.6 kilometres (23.4 mi) of this railway, between Perth and Byford, is used by Armadale line suburban rail services as part of the Transperth network. The line and the station is owned by the Public Transport Authority (PTA), an agency of the Government of Western Australia. Seaforth station is located between Gosnells station to the north and Kelmscott station to the south, within the suburb of Gosnells, Western Australia. The station is between Albany Highway to the east and Seaforth Avenue to the west, 22.6 kilometres (14.0 mi), or a 25-minute train journey, (Note: 25-minute train journey on a "C" pattern service, the most common service. 29-minute train journey on an all stops service.) from Perth station, and 7.8 kilometres (4.8 mi), or a 10-minute train journey, from Armadale station. This places the station in Transperth fare zone three.

Seaforth station consists of two side platforms which are approximately 100 metres (330 ft) long, enough for a four-car train but not a six-car train. The only way to cross the tracks is at a pedestrian level crossing at the southern end of the station. Two car parks with 41 bays in total are on Seaforth Avenue. Seaforth station is not fully accessible due to the ramps to the platforms being too steep.

== History ==
After a campaign by the South-East Gosnells Progress Association, the station opened on 4 May 1948, although it only had were low-level platforms and no name, being originally referred to as a "stopping place". Later that month, the Gosnells Road Board passed a motion that the name "Seaforth" be suggested to the Western Australian Government Railways (WAGR) (Note: Western Australian Government Railways is a predecessor to the Public Transport Authority.) after the name of a local estate.

When WAGR sought approval for the name from Canberra, the authorities were reluctant to approve the name because it was used for stations in all other Australian states. The station had since become colloquially known as "Woop Woop". (Note: Woop Woop is an Australian colloquialism for a place that is far away from anything.) The name Seaforth was eventually approved in April 1949.

In 1968, high-level platforms were constructed.

On 20 November 2023, the station was temporarily closed for 18 months to facilitate construction of the Victoria Park-Canning Level Crossing Removal and the Byford Rail Extension projects, which require that large sections of the Armadale line's track be rebuilt to be elevated.

== Services ==
Seaforth station is served by Transperth Armadale line trains.

Trains operate between Perth and Byford every 7.5 minutes on peak, every 15 minutes off peak and every 30 minutes at night, stopping all stations.

Before the shutdown, Armadale line services reached seven trains per hour during peak, dropping down to four trains per hour between peaks. At night, there were two trains per hour, dropping to one train per hour in the early hours of the morning. Apart from at night and on Sundays/public holidays, most train services followed the "C" stopping pattern, which skipped Burswood, Victoria Park, Carlisle, Welshpool and Queens Park stations. There were also two "B" stopping pattern services which ran during the afternoon Armadale-bound, and were the same as the "C" pattern except they additionally stopped at Queens Park. Starting at night, trains stopped at all stations. On Sundays and public holidays, half of all trains were "C" pattern trains and half all stops trains.

On Seaforth Avenue is a pair of bus stops for route 907, the rail replacement bus service. There is a pair of bus stops on the Albany Highway for route 220, which runs along Albany Highway from Perth Busport to Armadale station.

In the 2013–14 financial year, Seaforth station had 51,887 boardings, making it the least-patronised station on the Armadale and Thornlie lines. (Note: Least used aside from Belmont Park station, which closed on 13 October 2013 and only operated during certain events.) On an average weekday in October 2017, the station had 136 boardings, making it the least used Transperth station. The weekend average number of boardings was 170 in October 2018, making it the second least used Transperth station after Success Hill station. In 2018, City of Armadale Mayor Henry Zelones said that several hundred hectares of vacant land nearby had been set for high density development, which would increase patronage.

Seaforth platform arrangement
Stop ID	Platform	Line	Destination	Via	Stopping Pattern	Notes
99151	1	Armadale line	Perth		All stations	
99152	2	Armadale line	Byford		All stations	
