= Gosnells railway station =

Railway station in Perth, Western Australia

Gosnells
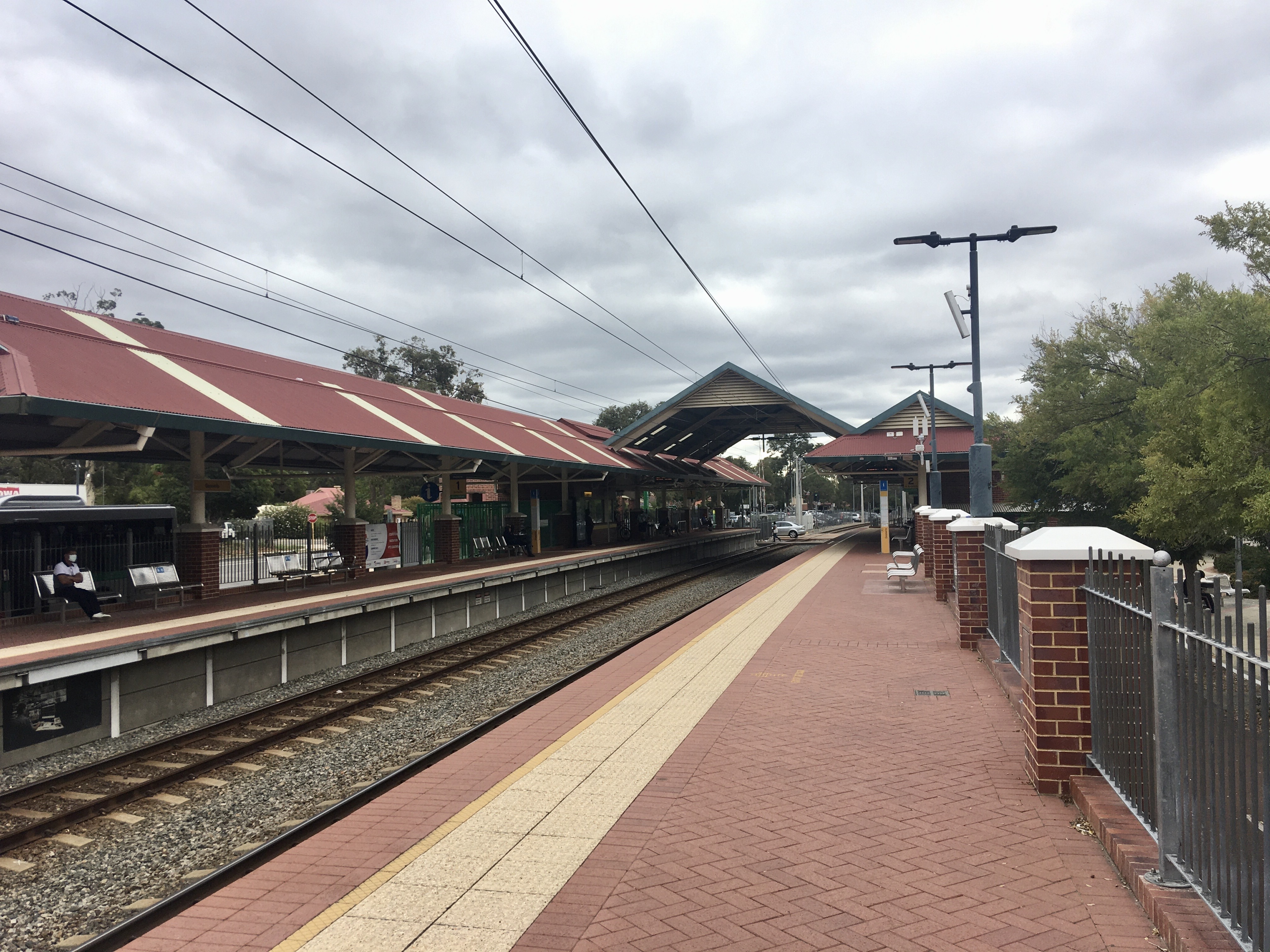
- Gosnells station in April 2022

General information
- Location: Wheatley Street, Gosnells; Australia
- Coordinates: 32°04′25″S 116°00′11″E
- Owner: Public Transport Authority
- Operator: Transperth Train Operations
- Line: South Western Railway
- Distance: 21.0 kilometres (13.0 mi) from Perth
- Platforms: 2 side
- Tracks: 2
- Bus routes: 6
- Bus stands: 6

Construction
- Structure type: Ground

Other information
- Station code: AGS; 99141 (platform 1); 99142 (platform 2)
- Fare zone: 3

History
- Opened: 1905
- Rebuilt: 17 April 2005

Passengers
- 2013-14: 461,553

Services
Preceding station	Transperth	Following station
Maddington towards Perth	Armadale line	Seaforth towards Byford
Former services
Preceding station	Transperth	Following station
Stokely towards Perth	Armadale line	Seaforth towards Armadale
Location
- Location of Gosnells railway station

Gosnells railway station is located on the South Western Railway 21 kilometres from Perth Station in the suburb of Gosnells. It is served by Armadale Line services which are part of the Transperth network.

== History ==
The original Gosnells station opened in 1905. On 17 April 2005 a new station opened 300 metres further north as part of a improvement program to rejuvenate the town centre and create a new retail main street running in an east-west direction across the train line. The station was built under the Gallop government's Building Better Train Stations program.

The station closed on 20 November 2023 as part of an 18 month shutdown to facilitate works on the Victoria Park-Canning Level Crossing Removal and Byford Rail Extension projects as part of Metronet. The station reopened on 12 October 2025 with the Byford extension.

== Services ==
Gosnells station is served by Transperth Armadale Line services.

The station saw 461,553 passengers in the 2013-14 financial year.

== Platforms ==
Gosnells platform arrangement
Stop ID	Platform	Line	Destination	Via	Stopping Pattern	Notes
99141	1	Armadale line	Perth		All stations	
99142	2	Armadale line	Byford		All stations	

== Bus routes ==
Stop	Route	Destination / description	Notes
Stand 1	215, 216	to Lumen Christi College	
Stand 2	228	to Thornlie Station via Westfield Street, Maddington Station & Thornlie Avenue	
Stand 3	216	to Thornlie Station via Fremantle Road & Spencer Road	
Stand 3	215	to Thornlie Station via Dorothy Street, Corfield Street & Spencer Road	
Stand 4	233	Cockburn Central Station via Southern River Road, Gracefield Boulevard, Nicholson Road & Armadale Road	
Stand 5	231	Gosnells Circular Service (anti-clockwise) via Eudoria Street, Anaconda Drive, Chamberlain Street & Harry Street	
Stand 5	232	Gosnells Circular Service (clockwise) via Harry Street, Ashburton Drive, Anaconda Drive & Eudoria Street	
Stand 6	907	Rail replacement service to Perth Station	
Stand 6	907	Rail replacement service to Byford Station	
Albany Highway (north-west bound)	220	to Elizabeth Quay Bus Station via Albany Highway	
Albany Highway (south-east bound)	220	to Armadale station via Albany Highway	
