= Kelmscott railway station =

Railway station in Perth, Western Australia

Kelmscott
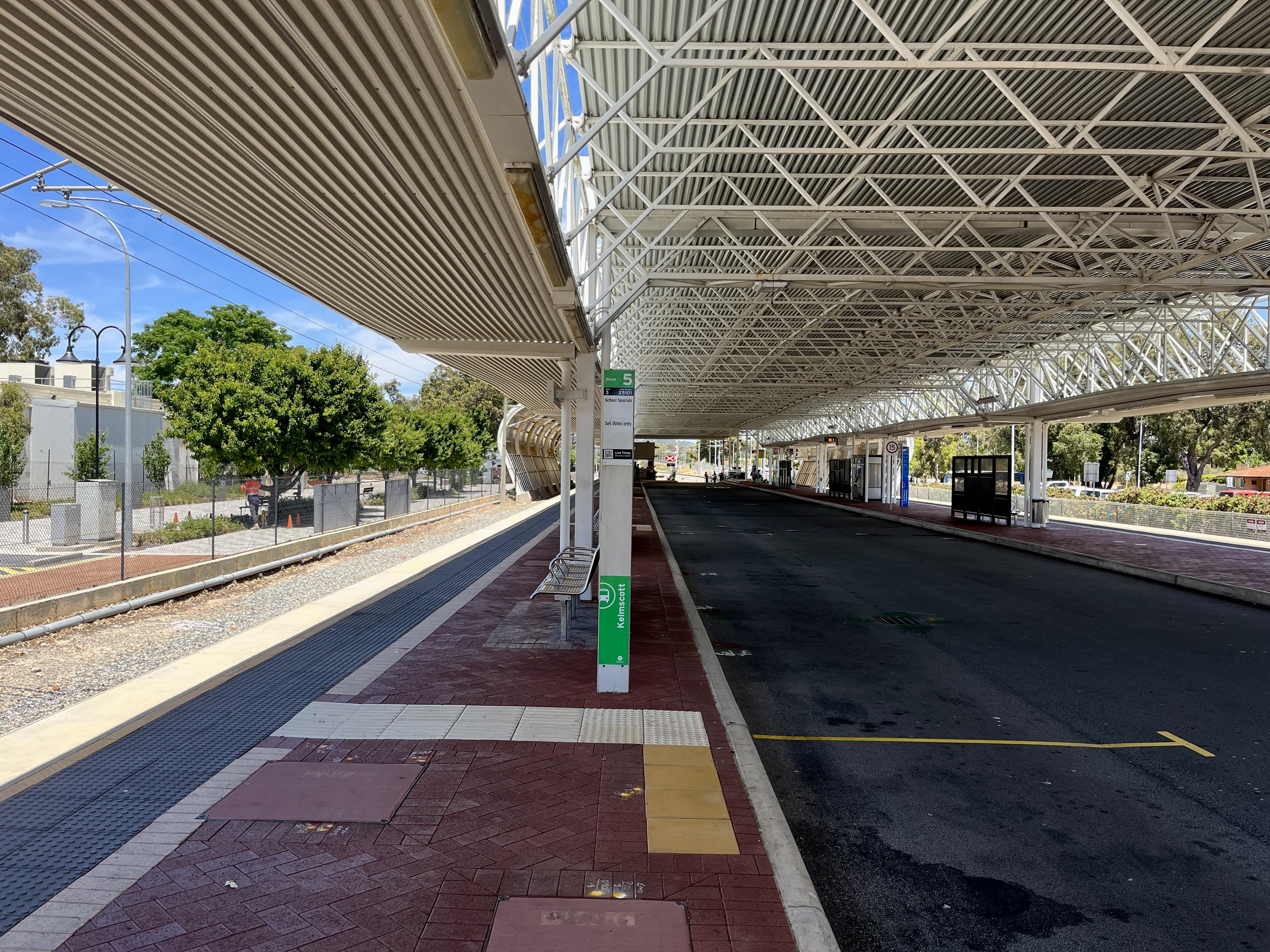
- Station in November 2023

General information
- Location: Railway Avenue, Kelmscott; Western Australia; Australia
- Coordinates: 32°06′48″S 116°00′47″E
- Owner: Public Transport Authority
- Operator: Transperth Train Operations
- Line: South Western Railway
- Distance: 25.9 kilometres (16.1 mi) from Perth
- Platforms: 2 (1 island)
- Tracks: 2
- Bus routes: 6
- Bus stands: 5

Construction
- Structure type: Ground
- Platform levels: 2

Other information
- Fare zone: 3

History
- Opened: 2 May 1893

Passengers
- 2013–14: 496,711

Services
Preceding station	Transperth	Following station
Seaforth towards Perth	Armadale line	Challis towards Byford
Location
- Location of Kelmscott station

Kelmscott railway station is located on the South Western Railway, 25.9 kilometres from Perth Station in the suburb of Kelmscott. It is served by Armadale Line services which are part of the Transperth network.

== History ==
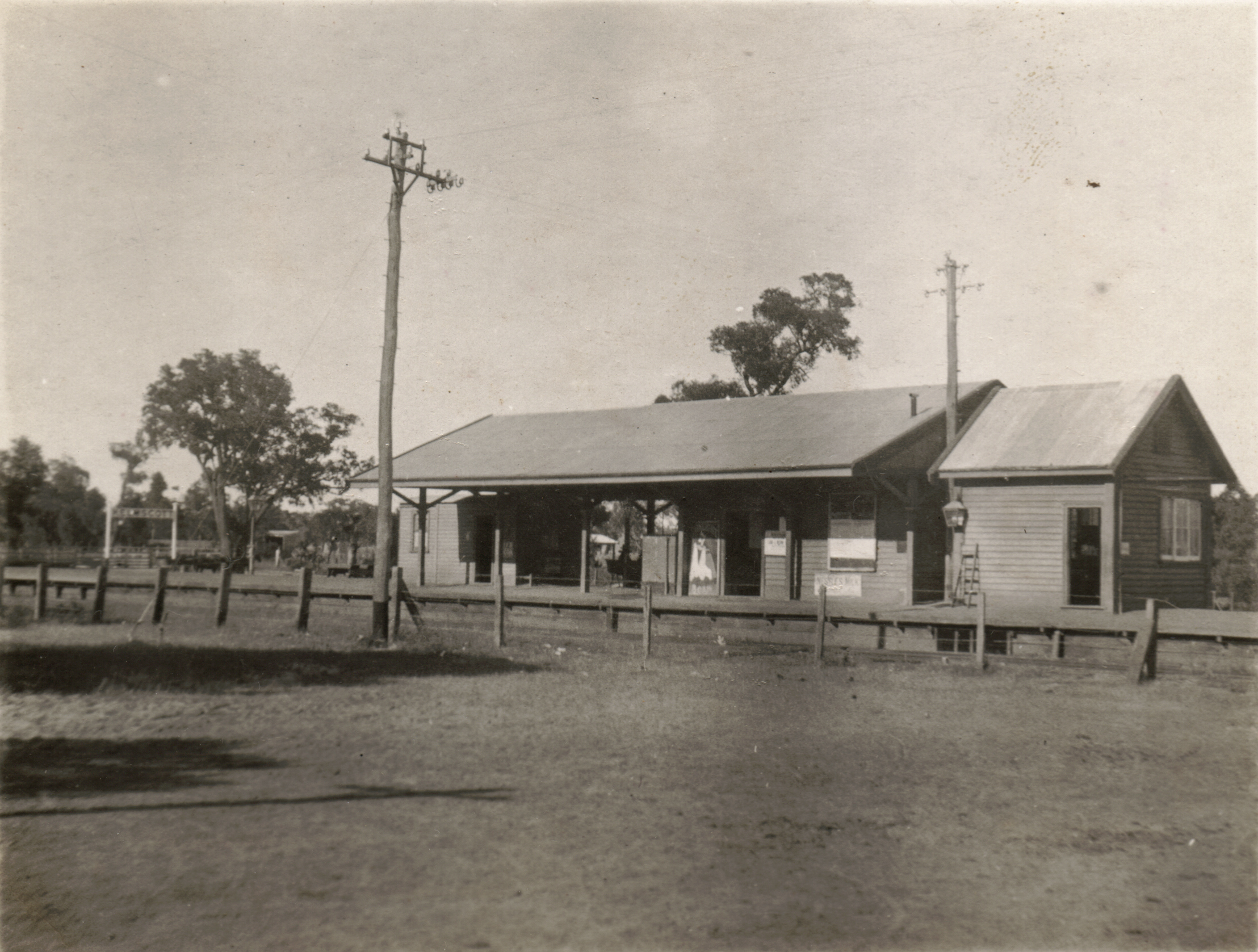
Kelmscott station in October 1920

Kelmscott station opened on 2 May 1893 as one of the original stations on the Armadale Line. A rebuilt Kelmscott station that integrated a bus interchange with its train platforms opened on 2 July 1980.

In 2008, the Public Transport Authority completed a $10.8 million upgrade of the station.

The station was closed on 20 November 2023 for an 18 month shutdown to facilitate works on the Victoria Park-Canning Level Crossing Removal and Byford Rail Extension projects. During this time the station received a number of upgrades, and saw the removal of the congested nearby level crossing at Denny Avenue and construction of a replacement underpass at Davis Road. This project also saw the refurbishment of the public space on the Albany Highway side of the station, with a new plaza constructed and the original Station Master's house restored. The station reopened on 12 October 2025 with the extension to Byford.

== Services ==
=== Train services ===
Kelmscott station is served by Transperth Armadale Line services. Until April 1992, it was served by The Australind.

The station saw 496,711 passengers in the 2013-14 financial year.

==== Platforms ====
Kelmscott platform arrangement
Stop ID	Platform	Line	Destination	Via	Stopping Pattern	Notes
99161	1	Armadale line	Perth		All stations	
99162	2	Armadale line	Byford		All stations	

=== Bus routes ===
Kelmscott station is unique from other Transperth bus interchange train stations as all 5 of its bus stands are located between the two platforms edges of the island platform. This means that all buses which serve the interchange must cross two bus-only level crossings to both enter and exit the train station.

==== Bus stands ====
Stop	Route	Destination / description	Notes
Stand 1	245	Armadale station via Westfield Road	
Stand 1	907	Rail replacement service to Perth Station	
Stand 1	686	to Crown Perth, Burswood	
Stand 2	243	to Armadale station via Seville Drive	
Stand 2	244	to Armadale station via Braemore Street	
Stand 3	219	to Armadale station via Armadale Kelmscott Hospital	
Stand 3	241	Kelmscott to Roleystone Circular Service	
Stand 4	240	Kelmscott to Clifton Hills Circular Service	
Stand 4	907	Rail replacement service to Armadale station	
Stand 5		Set down only	
Albany Highway (north bound)	220	to Perth Busport via Albany Highway	
Albany Highway (south bound)	220	to Armadale Station via Albany Highway	
