= Beckenham railway station =

Railway station in Perth, Western Australia

Beckenham
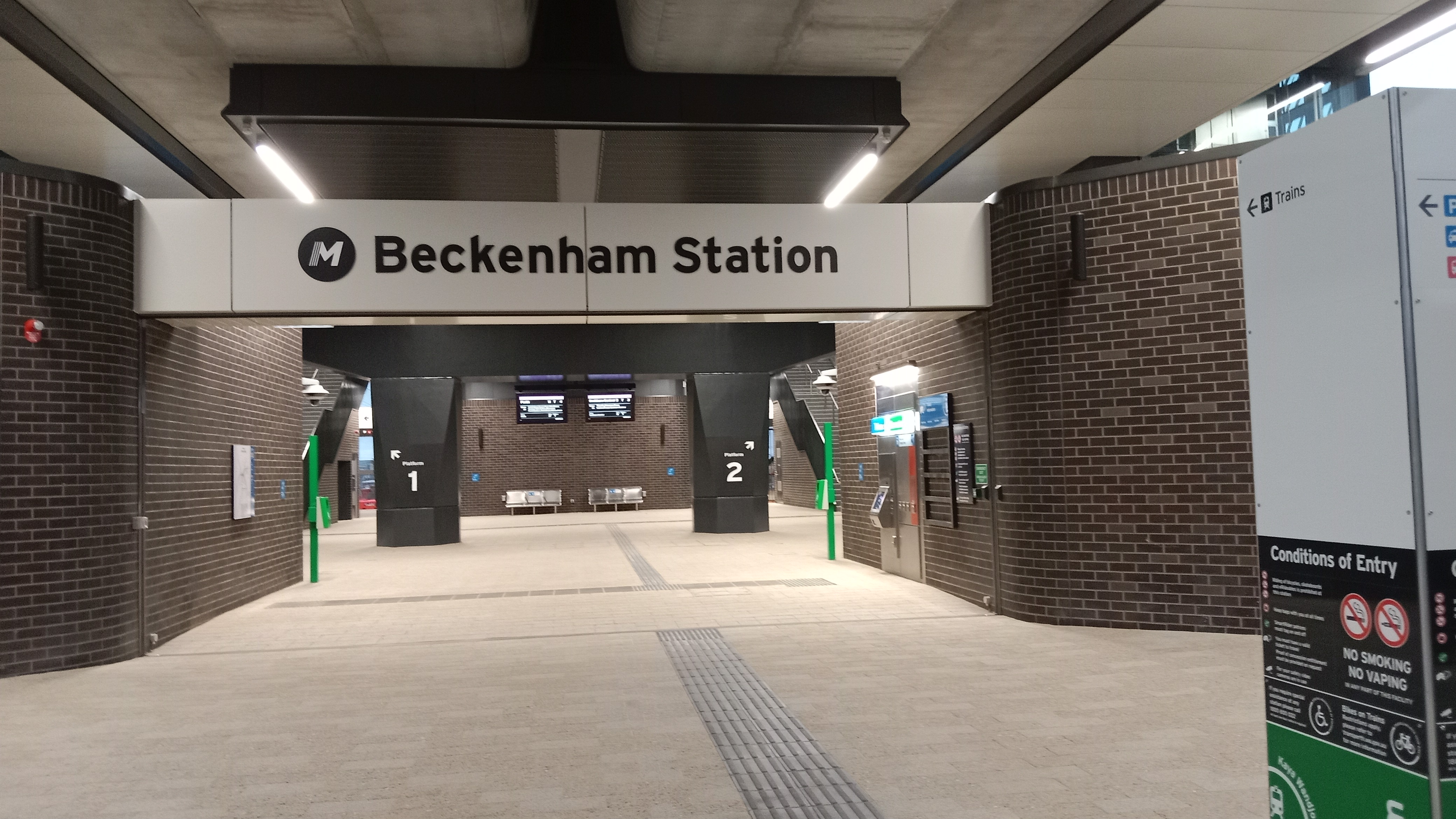
- New station entrance on the William St side

General information
- Location: Sevenoaks Street, Beckenham; Australia
- Coordinates: 32°01′22″S 115°57′15″E
- Owner: Public Transport Authority
- Operator: Public Transport Authority
- Line: South Western Railway
- Distance: 13.8 kilometres (8.6 mi) from Perth
- Platforms: 2 side
- Tracks: 2

Construction
- Structure type: Elevated
- Accessible: Yes

Other information
- Fare zone: 2

History
- Opened: 1954
- Closed: 20 November 2023
- Rebuilt: March 2014, mid-2025
- Former names: Higham

Passengers
- 2013-14: 191,969

Services
Preceding station	Transperth	Following station
Cannington towards Perth	Armadale line	Kenwick towards Byford
Cannington towards Perth	Thornlie–Cockburn line	Thornlie towards Cockburn Central
Location
- Location of Beckenham station

Beckenham railway station is a suburban railway station on the Transperth commuter rail network in Perth, Western Australia. It is located on the Armadale and Thornlie–Cockburn lines, 13.8 kilometres (8.6 mi) from Perth station serving the suburb of Beckenham. It closed on 20 November 2023 for construction works as part of the Victoria Park-Canning Level Crossing Removal Project and reopened 8 June 2025.

== History ==
The station opened in 1954 as Higham. The additional station, with two others on the Armadale line, marked the introduction of diesel-mechanical railcars on Perth's metropolitan passenger railways. Higham was renamed Beckenham in 1969. The platforms were staggered across William Street to minimise the time the level crossing is closed to road traffic.

When the Thornlie line opened in 2005, Thornlie line services did not stop at Beckenham station, passing it between Cannington station and the new Kenwick rail tunnel towards Thornlie station. Beckenham was not considered part of the Thornlie line service until the Thornlie–Cockburn line was expanded in 2025.

In March 2014 an $8.1 million upgrade to the station and adjacent car parks was completed.

On 20 November 2023 the station closed temporarily to allow it to be rebuilt as part of the Victoria Park-Canning Level Crossing Removal Project. The works involved the removal of the William Street level crossing that split the former staggered station in half, and a new elevated station located to the north of William Street to minimise its footprint. The new elevated station opened on 8 June 2025 for Thornlie-Cockburn Line services, with the Armadale Line following suit on 13 October 2025 when the Byford Rail Extension was completed.

== Services ==
Beckenham railway station is served by Transperth Armadale and Thornlie–Cockburn line services.

The station saw 191,969 passengers in the 2013-14 financial year.

Beckenham platform arrangement
Stop ID	Platform	Line	Destination	Via	Stopping Pattern	Notes
99111	1	Armadale line	Perth		All stations	
99111	1	Thornlie-Cockburn line	Perth		All stations, TP	
99112	2	Armadale line	Byford		All stations	
99112	2	Thornlie-Cockburn line	Cockburn Central		All stations	
