= Perth Stadium railway station =

Railway station in Perth, Western Australia

Perth Stadium
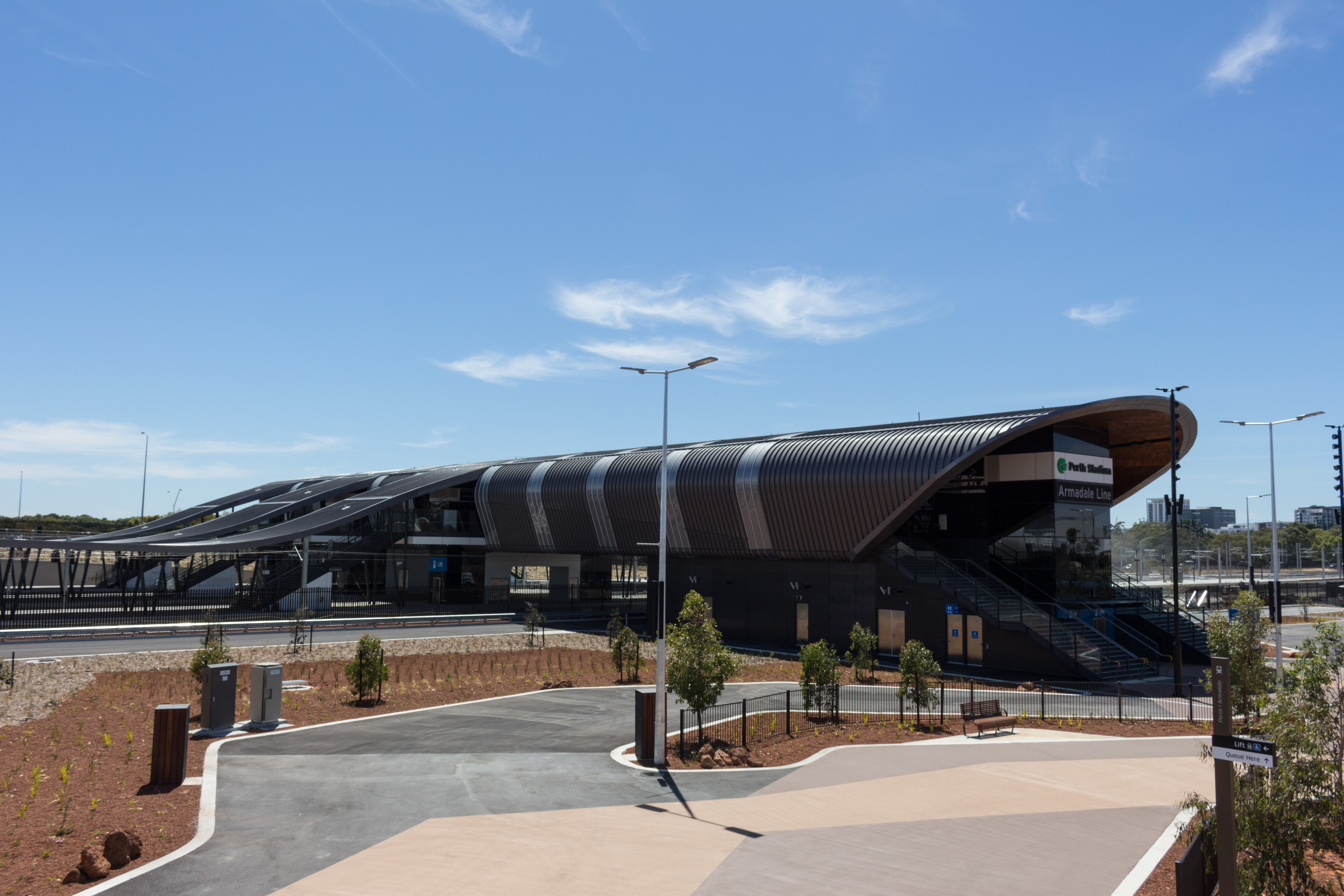
- Station concourse, forecourt and entrance, December 2017

General information
- Location: Victoria Park Drive, Burswood, Western Australia; Australia
- Coordinates: 31°57′00″S 115°53′34″E
- System: Transperth
- Owner: Public Transport Authority
- Operator: Transperth Train Operations
- Lines: Armadale line; Thornlie–Cockburn line; Special event services: Fremantle line; Mandurah line; Yanchep line
- Distance: 3.2 kilometres (2.0 mi) from Perth
- Platforms: 6 platform faces on 3 island platforms
- Tracks: 6

Construction
- Structure type: Ground
- Accessible: Yes

Other information
- Fare zone: 1

History
- Opened: 2 December 2017

Services
Preceding station	Transperth	Following station
Claisebrook towards Perth	Armadale line	Burswood towards Byford
Claisebrook towards Perth	Thornlie–Cockburn line	Burswood towards Cockburn Central
Event services
Preceding station	Transperth	Following station
Perth Terminus	Armadale line Stadium shuttle	Terminus
Leederville towards Yanchep	Yanchep line Stadium special	Terminus
City West towards Fremantle	Fremantle line Stadium special	Terminus
Terminus	Mandurah line Stadium special	Thornlie towards Rockingham or Mandurah
Perth Terminus	Thornlie–Cockburn line Stadium special	Carlisle towards Cockburn Central
Location
- Location of Perth Stadium railway station

Perth Stadium railway station is a railway station in Burswood, Western Australia, next to Perth Stadium (known under sponsorship as Optus Stadium). It is located on the Armadale and Thornlie–Cockburn lines. With six platforms, the station is the second largest on the Transperth network, after Perth railway station.

Before and after events, there are special services which run direct for the Fremantle line and Yanchep line, with Mandurah line services later added after the opening of the Thornlie–Cockburn line in 2025.

== Description ==
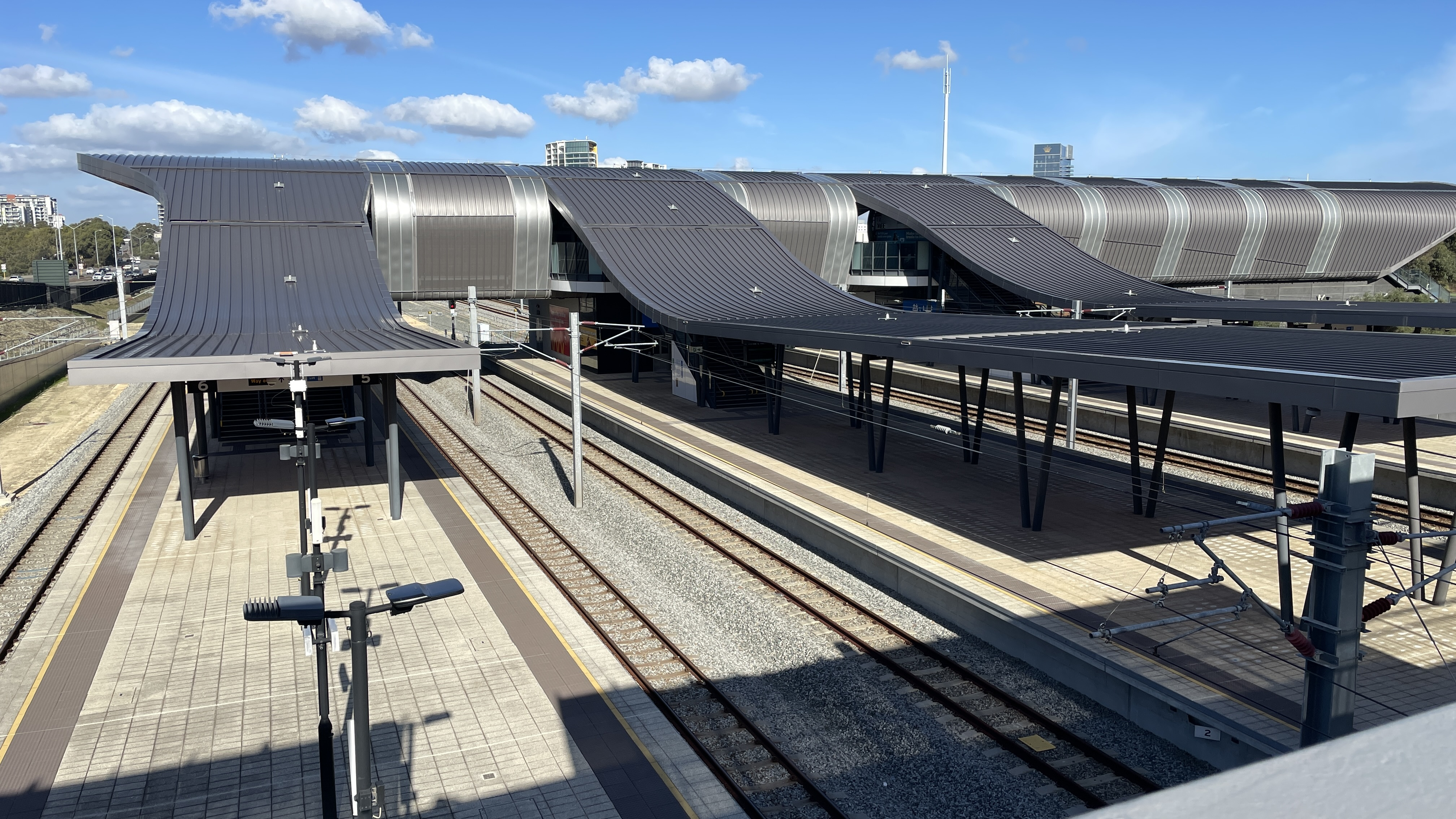
Platforms

Perth Stadium station is along the South Western Railway, which links Perth to Bunbury. The northern 30.4 kilometres (18.9 mi) of this railway, between Perth and Armadale, is used by Armadale line suburban rail services as part of the Transperth network. The line and the station is owned by the Public Transport Authority (PTA), an agency of the Government of Western Australia.

Perth Stadium station is to the east of Perth Stadium and to the west of the Graham Farmer Freeway, underneath Victoria Park Drive within the Perth suburb of Burswood, Western Australia. Adjacent stations are Claisebrook station to the west and Burswood station to the south-east.

The station has two concourses: the western concourse and the eastern concourse. The western concourse is north-west of Victoria Park Drive, and is only accessible on event days, connecting only to platforms three and four. The eastern concourse is south-east of Victoria Park Drive, and connects to all platforms. The eastern concourse connects to Perth Stadium through a underpass at Victoria Park Drive. Both concourses have stairs and lifts down to ground level, and toilets at their entrance.

The station is designed to move over 28,000 people following an event, nearly half of the stadium's 60,000 person capacity.

The station is listed as an independent access station on the Transperth website as the platform can be accessed using lifts, the platform gap is small, and tactile paving is in place.

== History ==
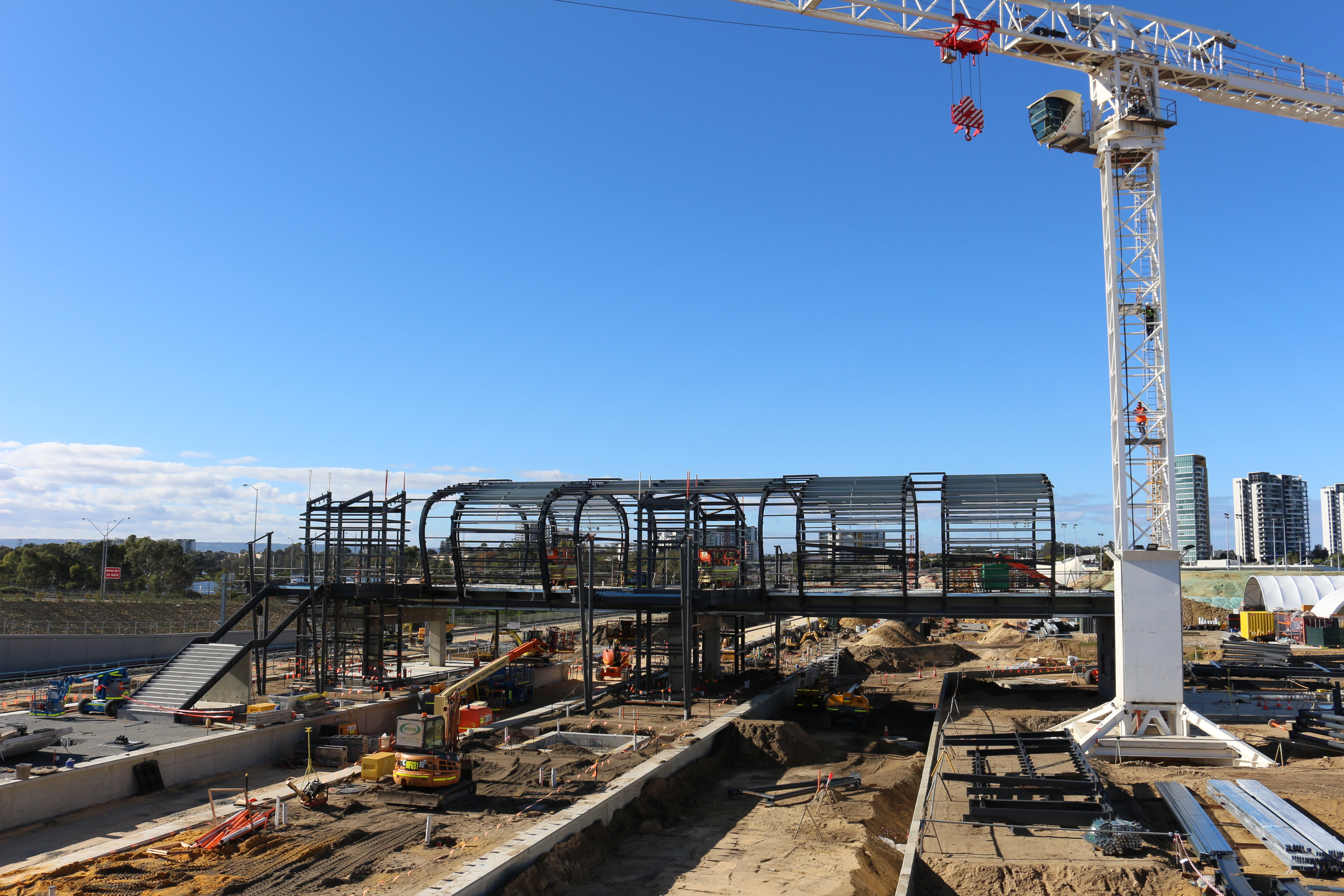
Perth Stadium station under construction, May 2016

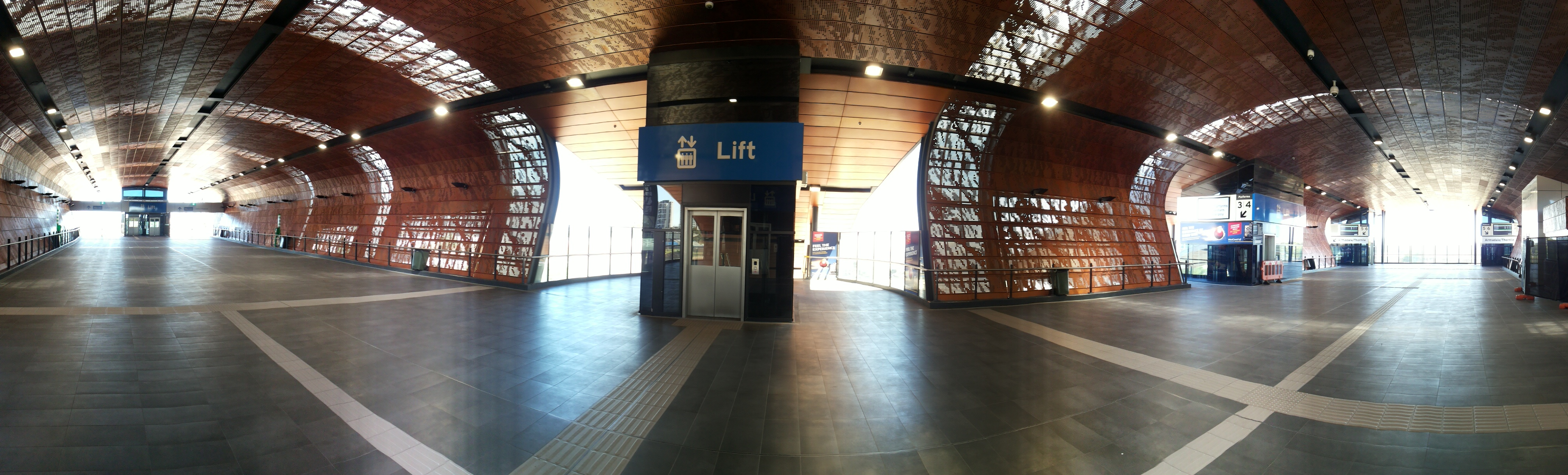
Panorama of the southern concourse

On 18 October 2013, Belmont Park railway station was closed to make way for the Perth Stadium railway station.

In October 2014, three parties were shortlisted to bid for the construction of the station:

- Multiplex/Downer Rail
- John Holland
- Laing O'Rourke/Aecom

The contract was awarded to Laing O'Rourke/Aecom in March 2015, with a targeted completion date of late 2017.

In January 2015, a 1.4-kilometre (0.87 mi) section of the line between Goongoongup Bridge and Burswood station was moved closer to the Graham Farmer Freeway to facilitate construction of the station.

Construction of the station commenced in August 2015.

Construction was completed in December 2017, before the stadium's opening in January 2018.

The station was announced as complete in a media statement from the state government on 2 December 2017.

The station hosts its first major event - the free Community Open Day on Sunday January 21, 2018

The station dropped its status as a 'Special Event Station' as trains on the Armadale Line began stopping at the station during the week from Tuesday, 2 April 2024

== Platforms and services ==
Trains serving Perth Stadium station are operated by Transperth Train Operations, a division of the PTA.

On days with no events, the station is served by both Armadale and Thornlie–Cockburn line services. This means a frequency of eight trains per hour during the day, with a lower frequency at night. Perth-bound trains use platforms 1 and 2, and Armadale and Cockburn Central-bound trains use platforms 5 and 6, with only platforms 2 and 5 operating on days with no events

For full-capacity events at Perth Stadium, the station is also served by direct services from the Fremantle and Yanchep lines, as well as the Mandurah line south of Cockburn Central. These operate in addition to regular services along those lines. Fremantle line trains use platform 3, Yanchep line trains use platform 4 and Mandurah line trains use platform 5. There is also a shuttle which goes from Perth Stadium station to Perth station, which can be used to transfer to and from the Airport line, Ellenbrook line, Mandurah line from Murdoch northwards, Midland line and the previously mentioned lines.

Prior to the 2023-25 rebuild, the station was served by Thornlie line services before events, but after events, the Thornlie line did not operate, so patrons had to catch the Armadale line to Cannington railway station and then catch a rail replacement bus.

Services may vary for events not projected to be full capacity. Prior to the station opening, the proportion of passengers for each line was predicted to be 3,000 for the Armadale line, 2,800 for the Fremantle line, 7,500 for the Yanchep line (then known as the Joondalup line) and 10,700 for the Mandurah line.

Platforms currently in use are as follows:

Perth Stadium platform arrangement
Stop ID	Platform	Line	Destination	Via	Stopping Pattern	Notes
99031	1	Platform not used on a regular basis.				
99032	2	Armadale line Thornlie-Cockburn line	Perth		All stations	
99033	3	Platforms not used on a regular basis.				
99034	4	Platforms not used on a regular basis.				
99035	5	Platforms not used on a regular basis.				
99036	6	Armadale line Thornlie-Cockburn line	Byford or Cockburn Central	Cannington	All stations	

== See also ==
- Perth Stadium bus station
