= Armadale line =

Suburban rail line in Perth, Western Australia

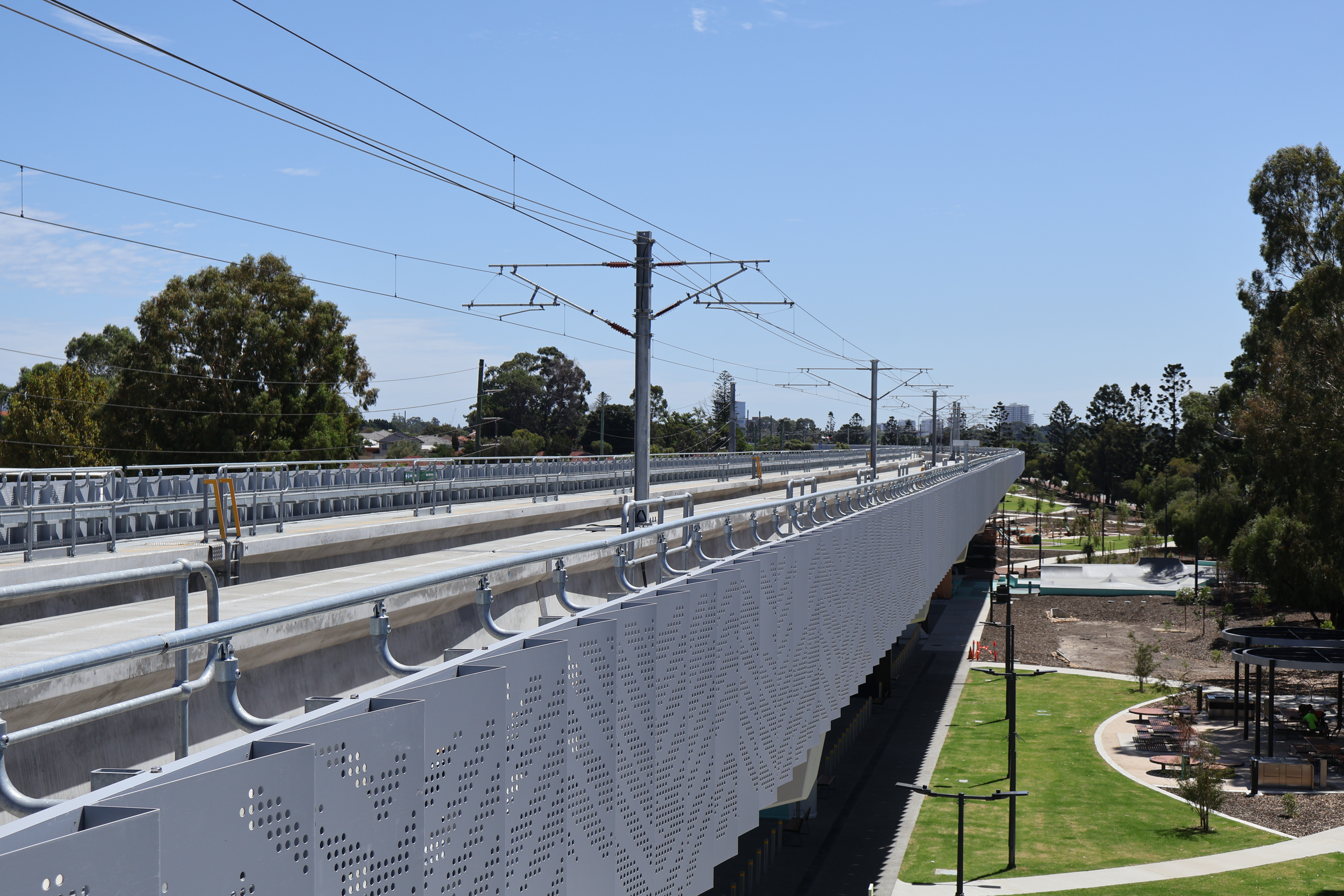
- An elevated section of the line, north of Oats Street station

Overview
- Owner: Public Transport Authority
- Locale: Perth, Western Australia
- Termini: Perth (north); Byford (south)
- Continues from: South Western Railway
- Stations: 20

Service
- Type: Suburban rail
- System: Transperth
- Operator: Transperth Train Operations
- Depot: Claisebrook railcar depot
- Rolling stock: Transperth A-series trains, Transperth B-series trains
- Ridership: 4,522,693 (year to June 2026)

History
- Opened: 22 May 1893
- Last extension: 12 October 2025

Technical
- Line length: 37.6 km (23.4 mi)
- Num of tracks: 2
- Character: At-grade and elevated
- Track gauge: 1,067 mm (3 ft 6 in) narrow gauge
- Electrification: 25 kV 50 Hz AC from overhead catenary
- Operating speed: 130 km/h (81 mph)
- Signalling: Fixed block signalling
- Train protection system: Automatic train protection
Route map
- Red shading denotes the Free Transit Zone

The Armadale line is a suburban railway service in Perth, Western Australia, operated by the Public Transport Authority as part of the Transperth system. The electrified suburban railway line is 37.6 kilometres (23.4 mi) long, running from Perth station in the CBD along the city's south eastern corridor to the growing suburb of Byford.

The Armadale line originated from suburban services along the South Western Railway in the 1890s. Suburban services were extended over the first half of the 20th century to eventually reach Armadale station. Diesel services commenced in 1954, which allowed for the opening of more stations closer together. Electrification occurred in the early 1990s, and in 2005, the Thornlie line opened as a branch of the Armadale line south of Beckenham. From 20 November 2023, the Armadale line between Victoria Park and Armadale stations was shut down for 18 months to facilitate major works that saw a significant portions of the line elevated on viaducts to remove level crossings and an 7.2 kilometres (4.5 mi) extension from Armadale to Byford. The line reopened between Victoria Park and Cannington in June 2025, with the remainder of the line and extension to Byford opening on 12 October 2025.

Services on the line run every 7.5 minutes on peak, every 15 minutes off peak, and every 30 minutes at night, stopping all stations between Perth and Byford. The line is predominantly served by 2 and 4 car A Series trains, with 3 car B Series occasionally used. The Armadale line received 4,522,693 boardings in the 2025–26 financial year.

== History ==
The South Western Railway between Perth and Pinjarra, Western Australia, opened on 22 May 1893. An extension south to Bunbury opened on 22 August 1893. Services were operated by the Western Australian Government Railways (WAGR). Initially, the railway had a limited passenger service, run by mixed trains. Suburban service were not provided, with trains going all the way to Bunbury.

By 1900, there were three daily suburban return services from Perth to Cannington. Kelmscott and Armadale were considered to be country towns, and were served by the daily train to and from Bunbury. By 1906, there were suburban services along the South Western Railway as far as Maddington. Seaforth station opened on 4 May 1948 as the line's first new station in several decades.

Diesel railcars were introduced in 1954, starting with the WAGR ADG class. Those trains could manage more closely spaced stations than steam-hauled ones, so three new stations opened on 28 November 1954: Oats Street, Higham (now Beckenham), and Stokely (closed 1989). By 1954, suburban services ran as far as Armadale station. Because the Armadale line was not as busy as the Fremantle and Midland lines, the Armadale line had a train every 40 minutes, as opposed to the other lines, which had trains every 20 minutes.

Suburban development in Perth's south-east corridor rapidly increased following the adoption of the Metropolitan Region Scheme in 1961 and the Corridor Plan for Perth in 1970. Kingsley (now Sherwood) and Challis stations both opened in 1973 between Kelmscott and Armadale stations. Only after the 1979 closure of the Fremantle line was there enough rolling stock for Armadale line services to reach the frequency of Midland line services. On 2 July 1980, a redeveloped Kelmscott station opened, with a bus interchange on the station platform. That was an early example of a bus-train interchange that would become commonplace on the later Yanchep and Mandurah lines.

Transperth was adopted as the trading name of the Metropolitan Transport Trust in 1986. The Armadale line was electrified in the early 1990s, with the electric Transperth A-series trains entering service in September 1991. Stokely station was closed on 16 April 1989 because it was the Armadale line's least-used station and close to Maddington station. Closing Lathlain station was proposed as well, but it remained open during electrification. In 2003, the Public Transport Authority was formed to take over from WAGR and the Department of Transport. Between 21 March 1993 and 8 August 2005, trains on the Armadale line continued through Perth to the Joondalup line, now known as the Yanchep line.

=== New MetroRail ===
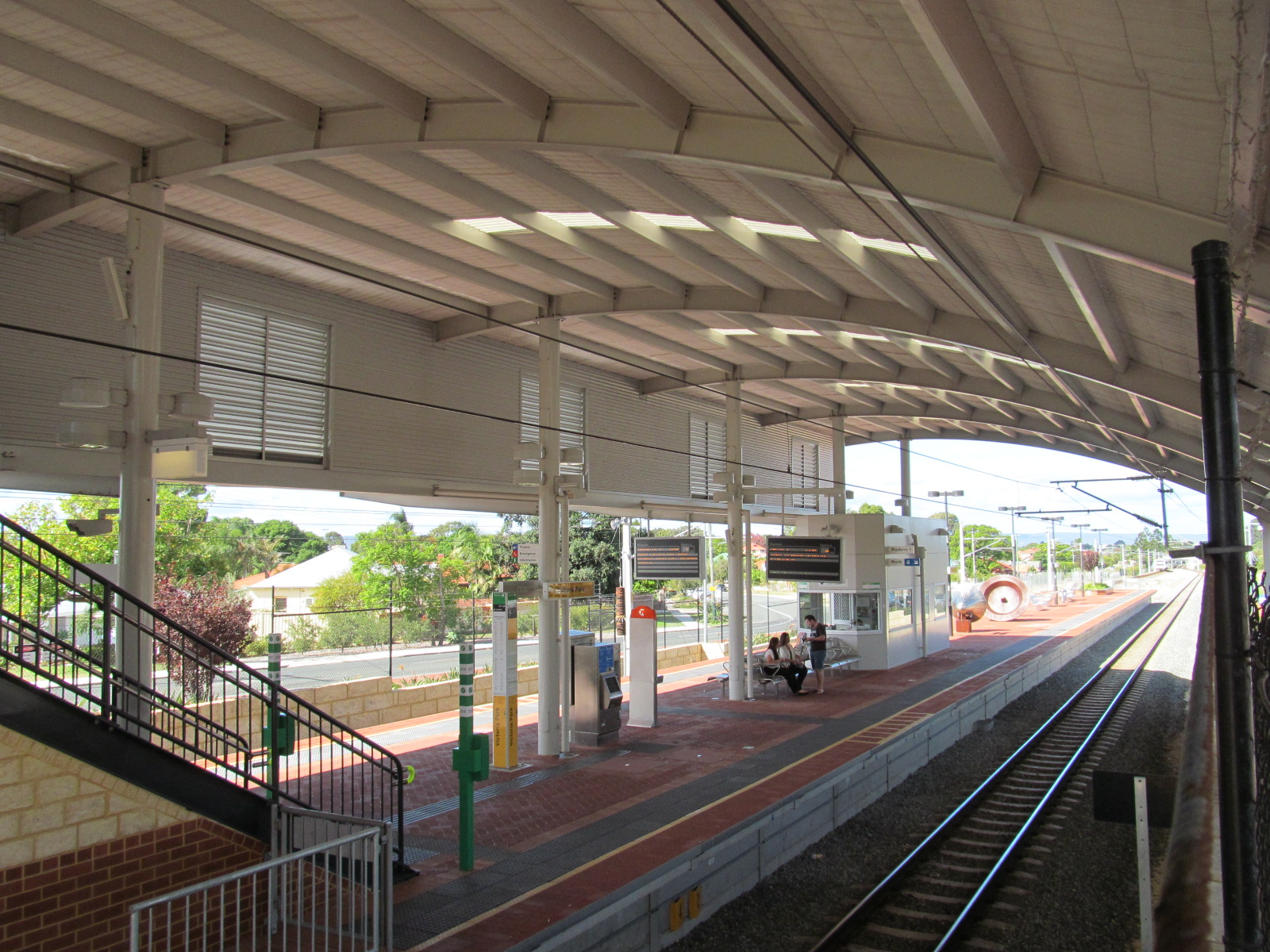
Victoria Park station, 2012

As part of New MetroRail in the 2000s, Carlisle and Victoria Park stations were upgraded, Lathlain station was closed on 3 February 2003, and the Miller Street bridge in Lathlain and the Gerard Street bridge in East Cannington were built to replace level crossings. The Thornlie line, a branch of the Armadale line south of Beckenham station, was opened on 7 August 2005. A reconstructed Armadale station opened on 6 November 2004, and the new and relocated Victoria Park station opened on 2 August 2008.

=== Perth Stadium station ===
Belmont Park station closed on 13 October 2013 to be replaced by Perth Stadium station, which opened on 2 December 2017 to serve Perth Stadium (known for sponsorship reasons as Optus Stadium). The station has six platforms and is served by additional express services from the Fremantle, Yanchep and Mandurah lines during events, using the Armadale line tracks. Initially operating during events only, a weekend service was added in 2018 and trains began stopping seven days a week from 2 April 2024.

=== Metronet ===
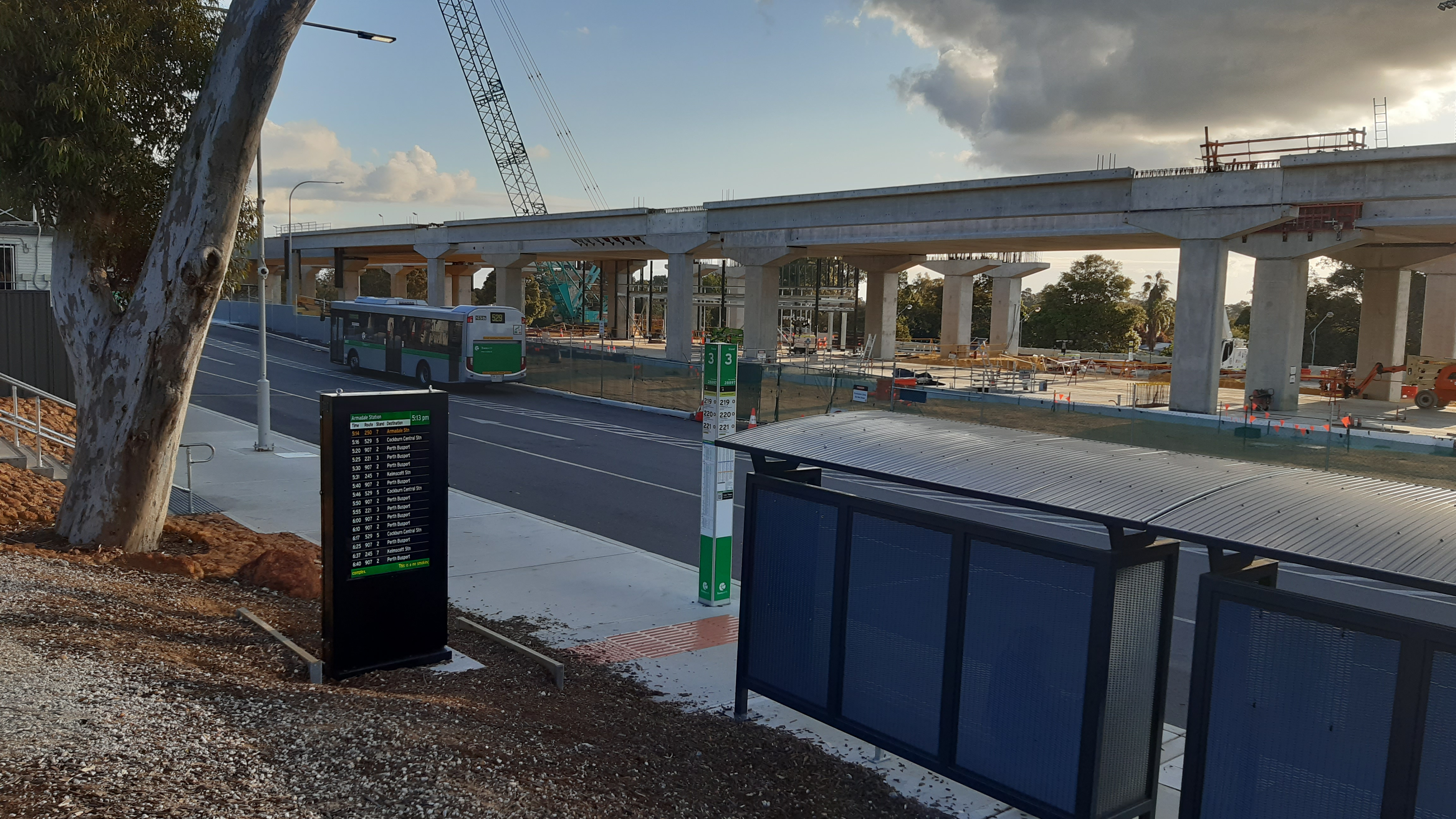
Bus replacement services at Armadale during the construction of the viaduct, September 2024

As part of Metronet, the Victoria Park-Canning Level Crossing Removal Project elevated the Armadale line along sections between Victoria Park and Beckenham. Five stations were rebuilt: Carlisle, Oats Street, Queens Park, Cannington and Beckenham, Welshpool station was permanently closed, and six level crossings were removed. Metronet also oversaw the extension of the line south to Byford, which included elevating the line through Armadale to remove three level crossings, creating a new elevated Armadale station. While these projects were completed, the PTA undertook the Rail Revitalisation Program, a maintenance project which upgraded the 15 km of track and made minor improvements to the remaining level crossings between the Victoria Park and Byford projects. As of October 2023, the budgeted cost for the Byford extension was $797 million, and the budgeted cost for the Victoria Park-Canning Level Crossing Removal Project was $1.047 billion.

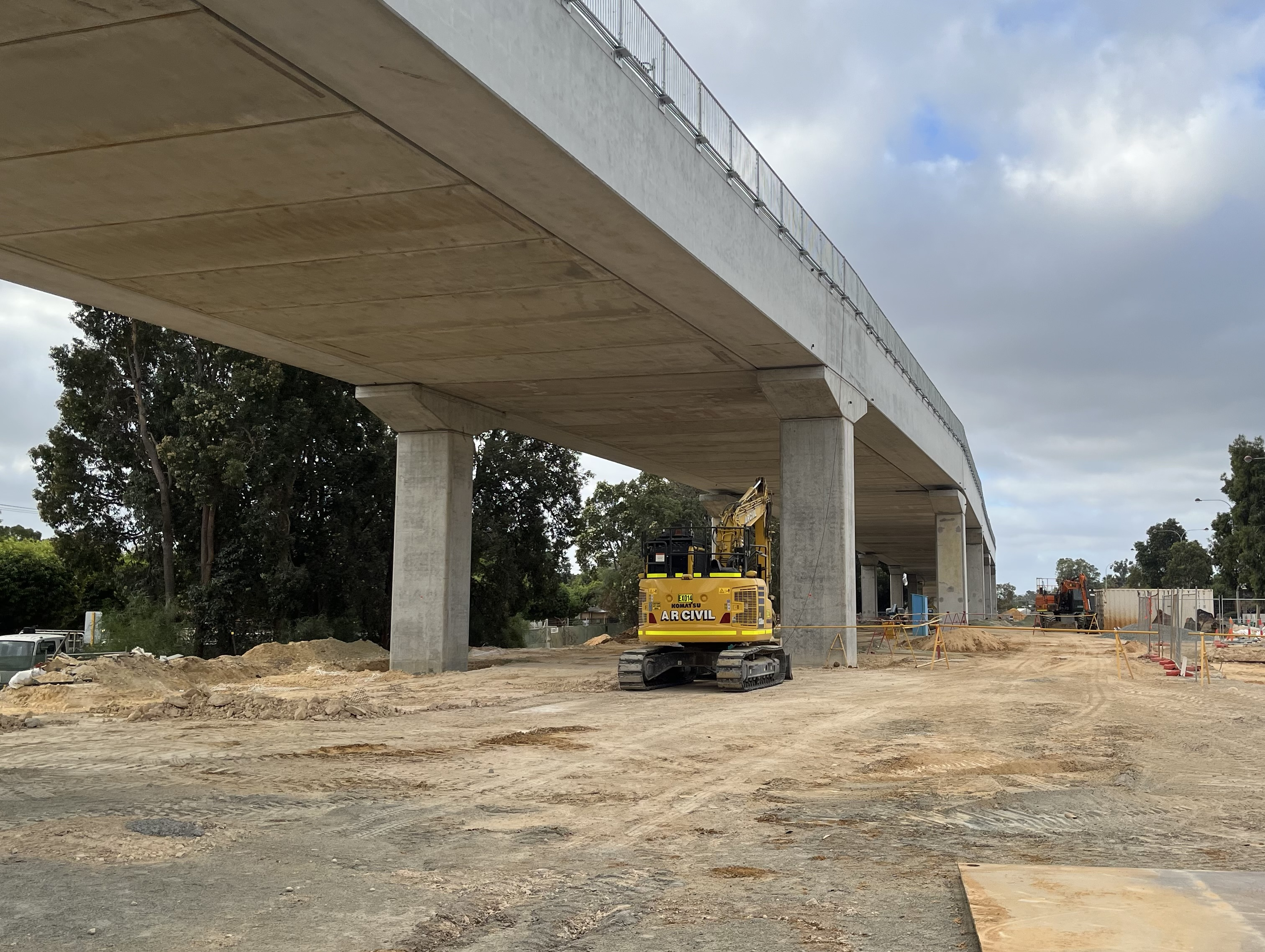
Viaduct near Armadale station, February 2025

In February 2022, it was announced that an 18-month-long shutdown of the Armadale line would need to occur to construct the Victoria Park-Canning Level Crossing Removal and the Byford Rail Extension projects. This shutdown was initially planned to begin in early-2023, but was delayed in August 2022 to late-2023. The shutdown, which closed the line between Victoria Park and Armadale stations, commenced on 20 November 2023. Armadale line services reopened as far as Cannington in June 2025 with the opening of the Thornlie–Cockburn line which would also service the new Beckenham station. The remainder of the line past Beckenham, including the Byford Rail Extension, opened on 12 October 2025.

== Description ==
The Armadale line uses 1,067 mm (3 ft 6 in) narrow gauge track and has a maximum speed of 130 kilometres per hour (81 mph). Trains are powered by 25 kV 50 Hz AC overhead line equipment which is powered by substations in Beckenham and East Perth.

The Armadale line uses fixed block signalling. As part of the High Capacity Signalling Project, Alstom and DT Infrastructure will replace the signalling system with Alstom's Urbalis communications-based train control (CBTC) system, allowing for higher frequencies of service. As of 2026, this is planned to be operational on the Armadale and Thornlie–Cockburn lines in 2032.

=== Stations ===
Station	Distance from Perth		Fare zone	Location	Opened	Connections and notes
Station	km	mi	Fare zone	Location	Opened	Connections and notes
Perth	0.0	0.0	1/FTZ	Perth	1881	Bus at Perth Busport,Australind, Airport, Ellenbrook, Fremantle, Mandurah, Midland, Thornlie–Cockburn and Yanchep lines
McIver	0.7	0.4	1/FTZ	Perth	1 September 1989	Airport, Ellenbrook, Midland and Thornlie–Cockburn lines
Claisebrook	1.3	0.8	1/FTZ	East Perth, Perth	1883	Airport, Ellenbrook, Midland and Thornlie–Cockburn lines
Perth Stadium	3.3	2.1	1	Burswood	2 December 2017	Event services from Perth, Fremantle, Mandurah and Yanchep run during events at Perth Stadium.
Burswood	4.6	2.9	1	Burswood	1899	Thornlie–Cockburn line
Victoria Park	6.1	3.8	1	Lathlain, Victoria Park	1898	Thornlie–Cockburn line
Carlisle	7.4	4.6	1	Carlisle, East Victoria Park	1912	Bus, Thornlie–Cockburn line
Oats Street	8.1	5.0	1	Carlisle, East Victoria Park	28 November 1954	Bus, Thornlie–Cockburn line
Queens Park	11.3	7.0	2	Cannington, Queens Park	1899	Thornlie–Cockburn line
Cannington	12.2	7.6	2	Cannington, East Cannington	1893	Bus, Thornlie–Cockburn line
Beckenham	13.6	8.5	2	Beckenham	28 November 1954	Thornlie-Cockburn line
Kenwick	15.6	9.7	2	Kenwick	1914	
Maddington	17.6	10.9	2	Maddington	1896	Bus
Gosnells	20.7	12.9	3	Gosnells	1905	Bus
Seaforth	22.6	14.0	3	Gosnells	4 May 1948	
Kelmscott	25.8	16.0	3	Kelmscott	1893	Bus
Challis	27.3	17.0	3	Kelmscott	29 October 1973	
Sherwood	28.6	17.8	3	Armadale	1973	
Armadale	30.4	18.9	4	Armadale	1893	Bus, Australind
Byford	37.6	23.4	4	Byford	12 October 2025	Bus, Australind

=== Former stations ===
Station	Location	Opened	Closed
Stokely	Maddington	28 November 1954	16 April 1989
Lathlain	Lathlain, Victoria Park	2 May 1959	2 February 2003
Belmont Park	Burswood	1906	13 October 2013
Welshpool	Bentley, Welshpool	1898	20 November 2023

== Service ==
Trains operate between Perth and Byford stopping at all stations. Services operate at a 7.5 minute frequency on peak, every 15 minutes off peak and every 30 minutes at night. Operating hours are from roughly 5:00 am to 1:00 am, extending to 3:00 am on Saturday and Sunday mornings.

Transperth train services are operated by the PTA's Transperth Train Operations division. Before the start of the shutdown, Armadale line trains operated at four trains per hour during the day, rising to seven trains per hour during peak. At night, frequencies reduced to every half an hour, and every hour late at night. Armadale line trains typically stopped at all stations between Armadale and Cannington and skipped most stations between Cannington and Perth, with the exception of Oats Street, Claisebrook, and McIver stations. Thornlie line trains instead stopped at all stations between Cannington and Perth. Armadale line trains only stopped at all stations on Sundays when Thornlie line trains were less frequent, and late at night when Thornlie line trains did not operate.

=== Rolling stock ===
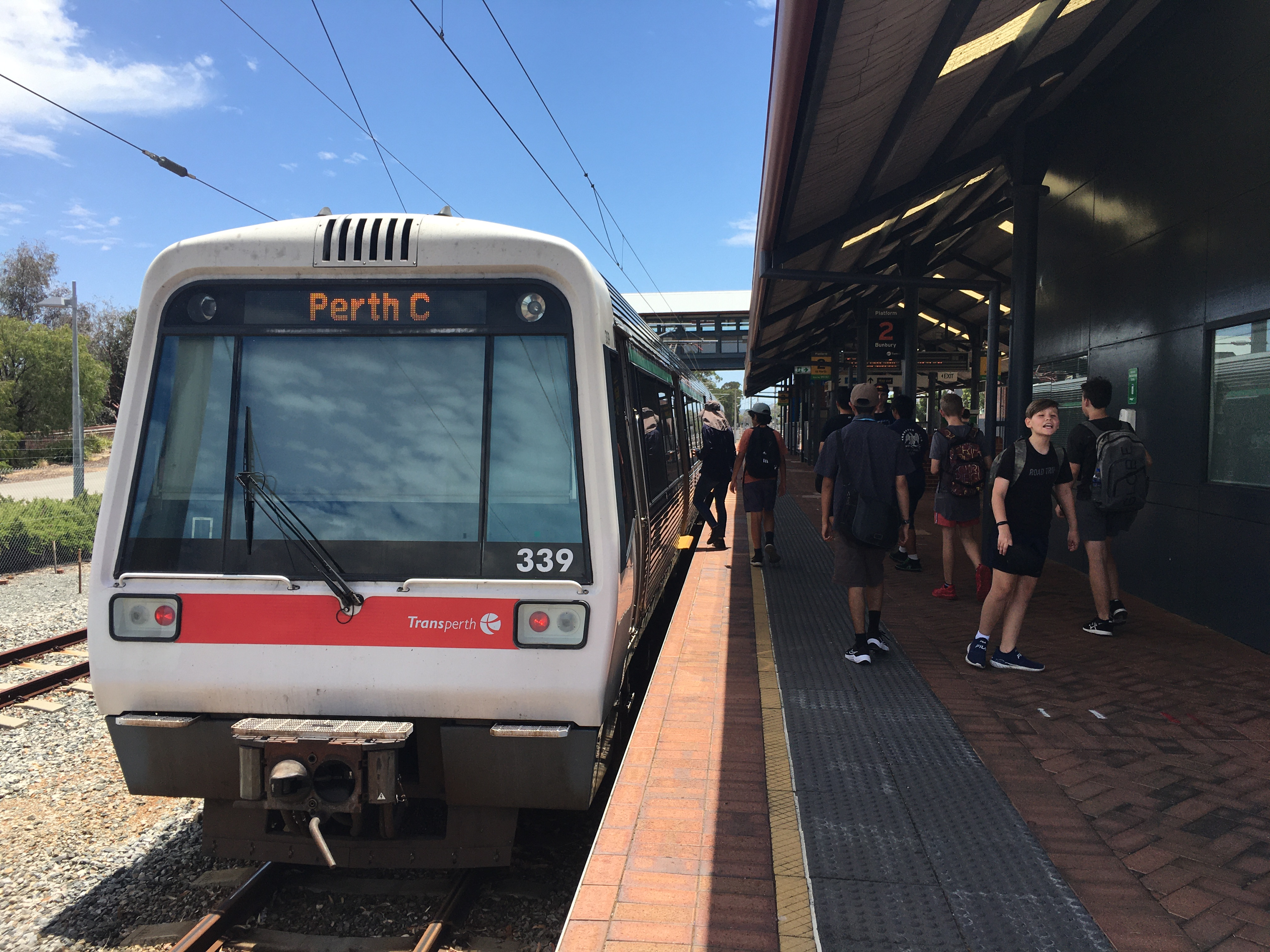
A Transperth A-series train at Armadale station

The Armadale line is served primarily by Transperth A-series trains, with Transperth B-series trains occasionally used as well. By 2031, it is planned that all A-series trains will be retired, leaving the Armadale line to be served primarily by B-series trains. The A-series trains were built between 1991 and 1999 and consist of two cars which are usually joined together to form four car trains. Each car has two doors on each side. The B-series trains were built between 2004 and 2019, consist of three cars each and have two doors on the side of each car. These trains are all primarily stored at Claisebrook depot.

=== Patronage ===
Armadale line (Note: Before the Thornlie–Cockburn Link opened in 2025, the patronage for the Armadale line included the patronage for the Thornlie line.) annual patronage
Year	Patronage	±%
2010–11	8,838,049	—
2011–12	9,227,813	+4.41%
2012–13	9,667,987	+4.77%
2013–14	9,176,434	−5.08%
2014–15	9,066,797	−1.19%
2015–16	8,508,290	−6.16%
2016–17	7,385,888	−13.19%
2017–18	7,735,572	+4.73%
2018–19	7,983,379	+3.20%
2019–20	6,653,213	−16.66%
2020–21	5,768,087	−13.30%
2021–22	5,629,910	−2.40%
2022–23	6,626,803	+17.71%
2023–24	3,878,183	−41.48%
2024–25	1,515,510	−60.92%
2025–26	4,522,693	+198.43%
