= Belmont Park railway station, Perth =

Former railway station in Perth, Western Australia

Belmont Park
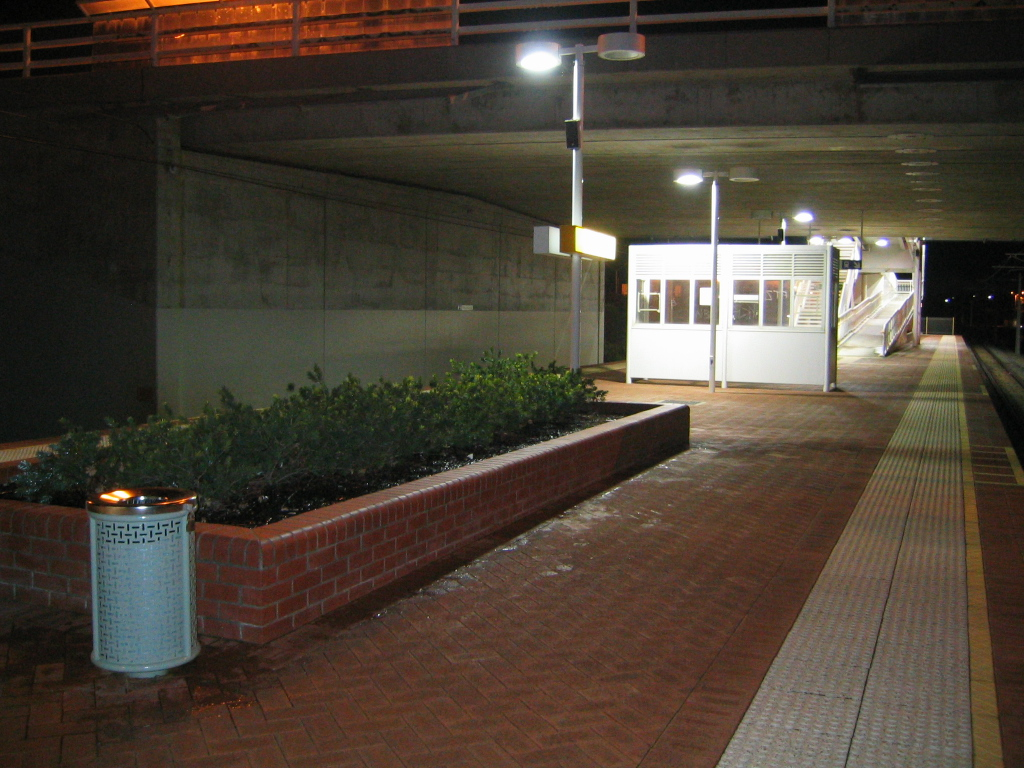
- Station in June 2005

General information
- Location: Victoria Park Drive, Burswood; Australia
- Coordinates: 31°57′00″S 115°53′34″E
- Owner: Public Transport Authority
- Operator: Transperth
- Distance: 3.2 kilometres from Perth
- Platforms: 2 (1 island)
- Tracks: 2

Construction
- Structure type: Ground

Other information
- Status: Replaced by Perth Stadium
- Station code: ABP; 99031 (platform 1); 99032 (platform 2)
- Fare zone: 1

History
- Opened: 1906
- Closed: 18 October 2013
- Former names: Goodwood

Passengers
- 2013–14: 1,358

Services
| Preceding station | Transperth | Following station |
|---|---|---|
| Claisebrook towards Perth | Armadale line R | Burswood towards Armadale or Thornlie |
| Claisebrook towards Perth | Thornlie Line R | Burswood towards Armadale or Thornlie |
Location

Belmont Park railway station was located on the Armadale/Thornlie line in Perth, Western Australia. It was operated by Transperth serving Belmont Park Racecourse from 1906 until 2013. The station saw 1,358 passengers in the 2013–14 financial year.

== History ==
Belmont Park station opened in 1906 as Goodwood. In 1979, it was renamed Belmont Park, and was used only when there was an event at the Belmont Park Racecourse.

The station closed on 13 October 2013 to make way for the Perth Stadium station that was built to serve Perth Stadium.
