= Victoria Park-Canning Level Crossing Removal Project =

Railway elevation project in Perth, Western Australia

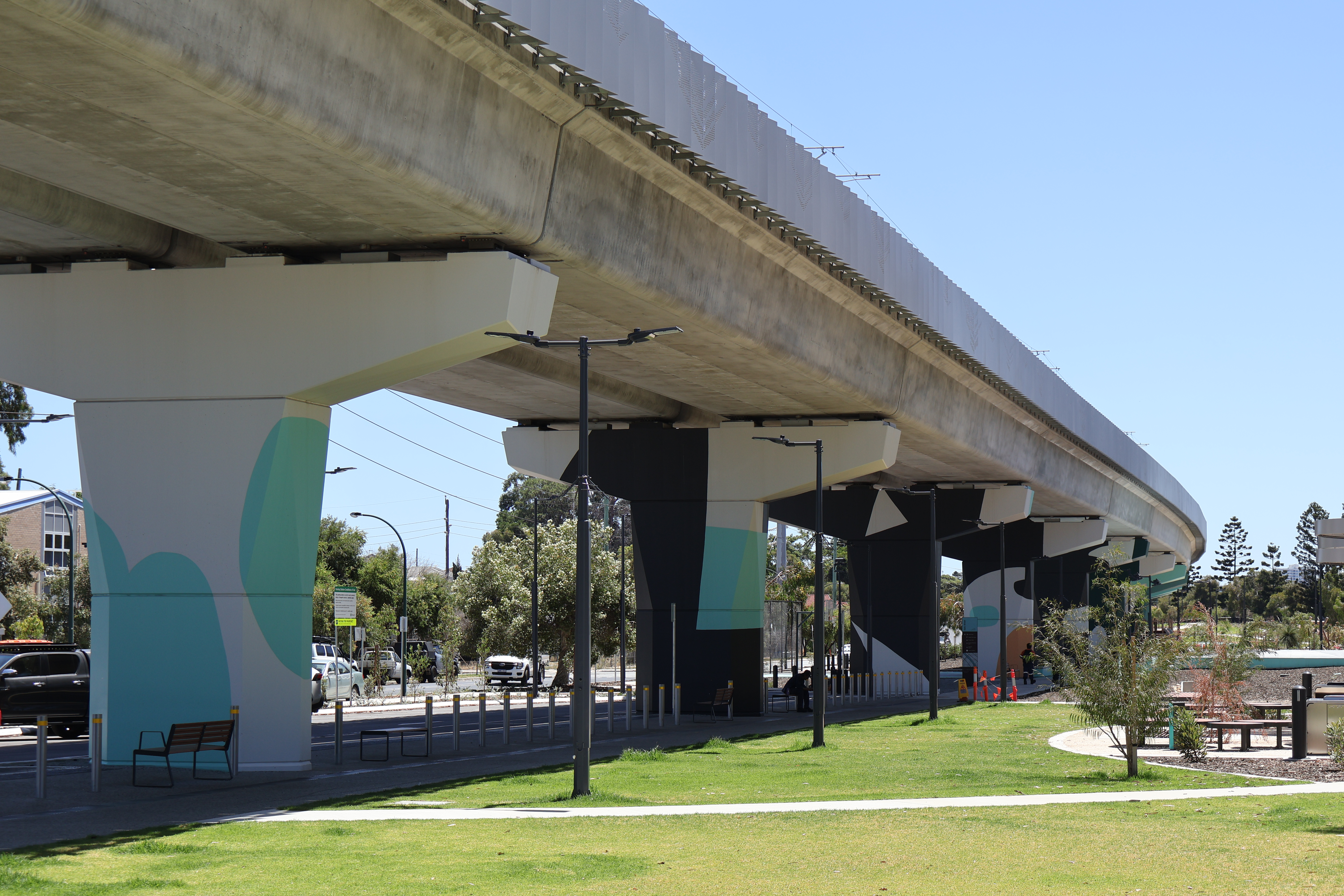
Near Oats Street station in 2026

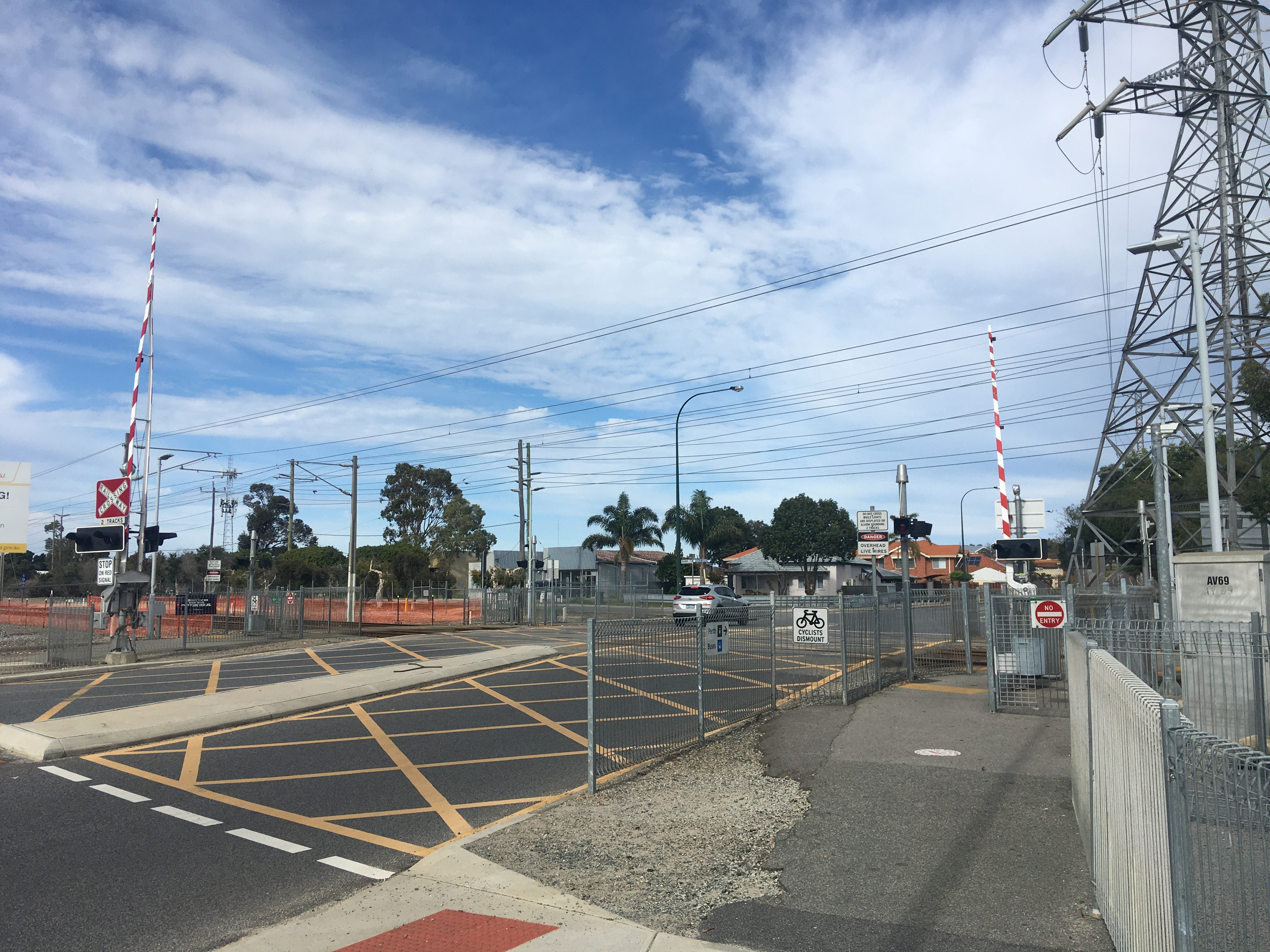
Oats Street level crossing in August 2022

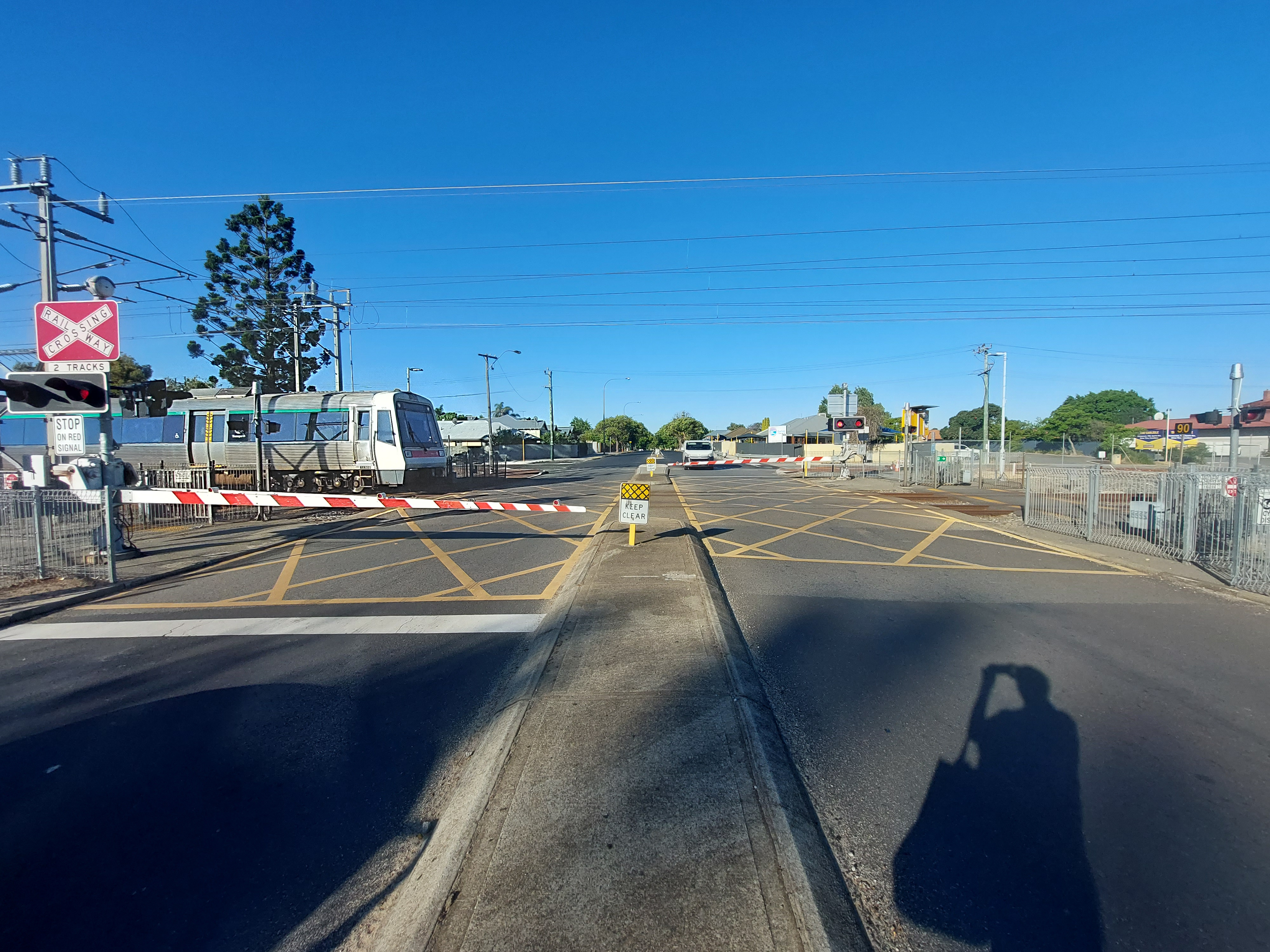
Mint Street level crossing in November 2023

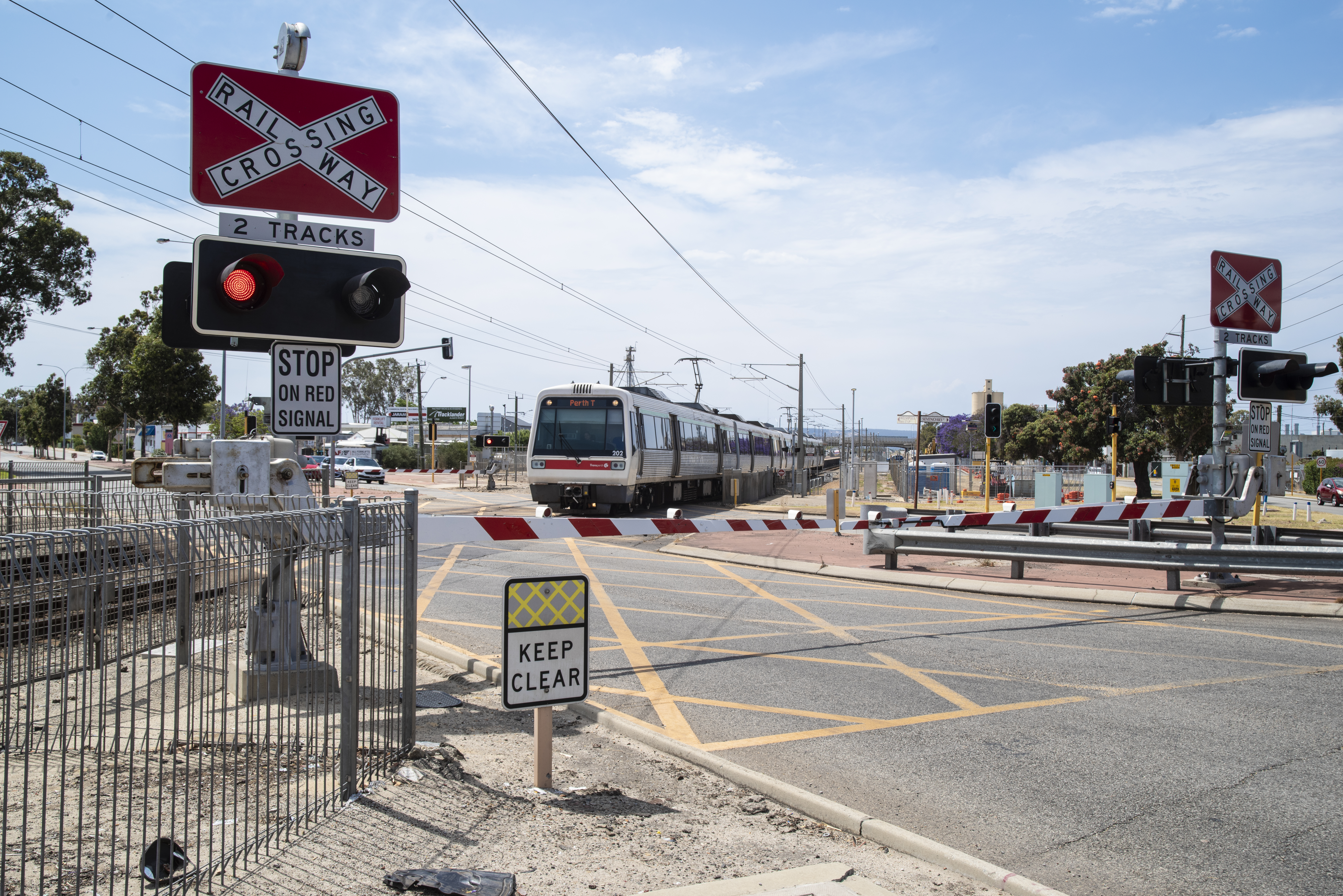
Welshpool Road level crossing in November 2023

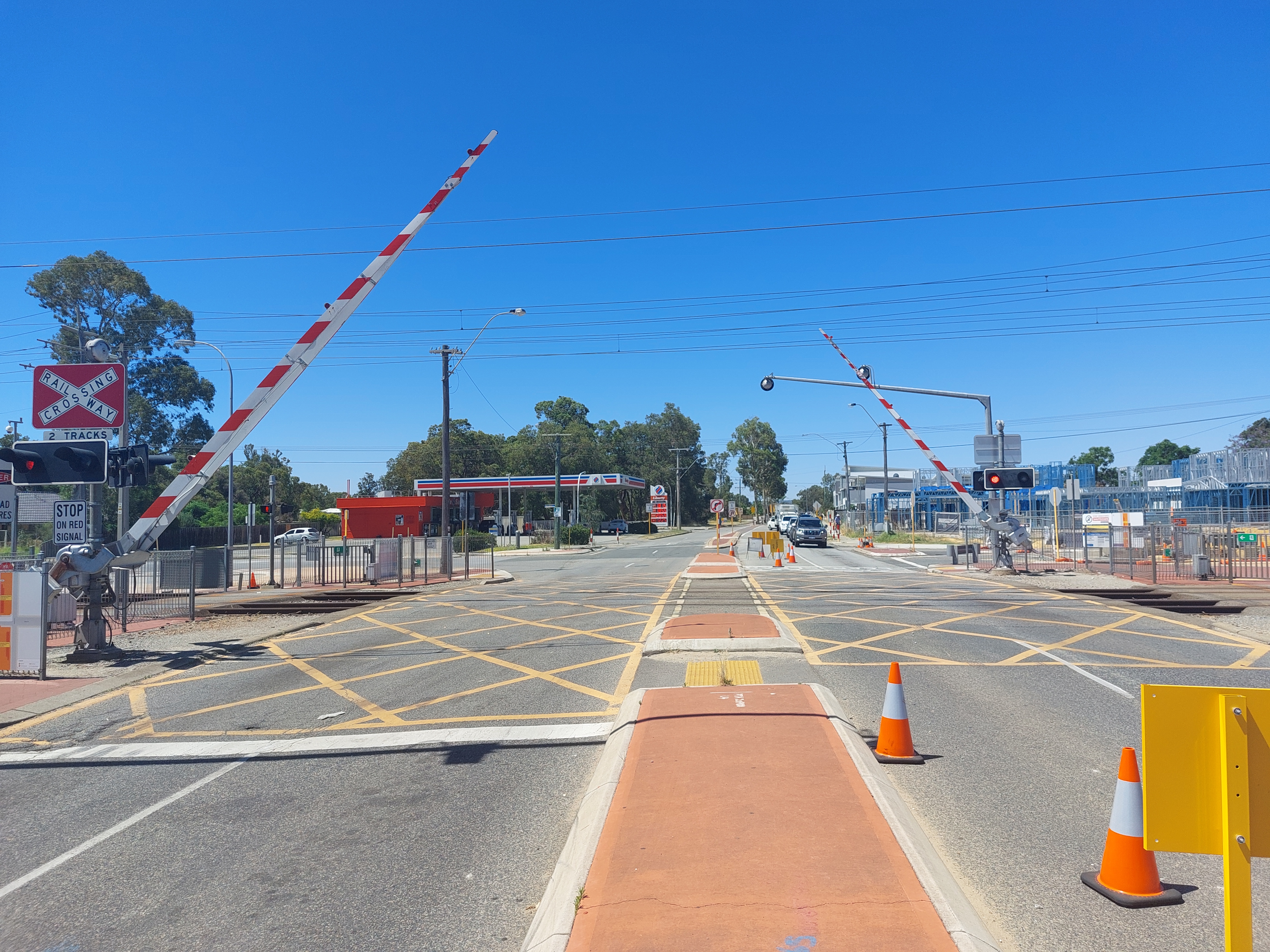
William Street level crossing in November 2023

The Victoria Park-Canning Level Crossing Removal Project is a project by the Government of Western Australia to elevate part of the Armadale line, thereby removing six level crossings and rebuilding five stations to modern standards. The project is a part of the wider Metronet initiative undertaken by the state government. The stations to be rebuilt as part of the project are, from north to south, Carlisle, Oats Street, Queens Park, Cannington, and Beckenham. Welshpool station was closed due to low patronage and technical constraints. The level crossings to be removed as part of the project are Mint Street, Oats Street, Welshpool Road, Hamilton Street, Wharf Street, and William Street.

The project originated from an election promise by the Labor Party in the lead up to the 2017 Western Australian state election, promising to remove the Oats Street and Wharf Street level crossings among others as part of their proposed Metronet project. The project was later expanded to cover the other level crossings. In June 2020, the decision that a viaduct had been chosen as the method of level crossing removal was revealed. A federal funding promise by the Labor Party at the 2022 Australian federal election brought Beckenham station and the William Street level crossing into the project. In August 2022, the $701 million contract was signed with the Armadale Line Upgrade Alliance, a consortium of Acciona Construction, BMD Constructions, WSP and AECOM. The project is jointly funded by the state and federal governments. This did not include the $175 million for the William Street and Beckenham station portion of the project, with that to be included in the scope of the contract once planning for that is complete.

The bulk of the construction will take place during an 18-month long shutdown of the Armadale line starting on 20 November 2023. This was initially going to occur starting in early-2023, but was delayed. Running concurrently to this project and as part of Metronet are the Thornlie-Cockburn Link, which is an extension of the Thornlie line to Cockburn Central station, and an extension of the Armadale line to Byford, which will have major works done during the shutdown as well. The shutdown has faced questions from the state opposition over whether it will be complete on time, and from transport experts. Local governments have also complained, saying they were not consulted. The decision to go with elevated rail rather than underground rail, similar to the sinking of Subiaco station and surrounding railway, has been criticised by the mayor of the Town of Victoria Park.

== Background ==
The six level crossings between Mint Street in East Victoria Park and William Street in Beckenham have the most frequent closures of any level crossing on the Transperth network, closing up to 280 times per day totalling up to 7.5 hours per day. Additionally, none of the stations between Carlisle station and Beckenham station are compliant with the Disability Discrimination Act (DDA).

== Design ==
The Victoria Park-Canning Level Crossing Removal Project is divided into two components: the Oats Street Package and the Wharf Street Package.

The Oats Street Package involves the removal of level crossings at Mint Street, Oats Street, and Welshpool Road, as well as the rebuild of Carlisle and Oats Street stations as elevated stations and the permanent closure of Welshpool station. This requires a 1.4-kilometre-long (0.87 mi) viaduct from northwest of Mint Street to southeast of Oats Street. The railway will return to grade south of Oats Street station before rising up again to pass over Welshpool Road along a 160-metre (520 ft) bridge. The decision was made to close Welshpool station instead of rebuilding it, as that station has low patronage and is close to Oats Street station.

The Wharf Street Package involves the removal of level crossings at Hamilton Street and Wharf Street, as well as the rebuild of Queens Park and Cannington stations. This requires a 1.8-kilometre (1.1 mi) viaduct from northwest of Wharf Street to northwest of Gerard Street. A turnback facility will be built southeast of Cannington station. As funding for Beckenham station and William Street came after the rest of the project, detailed planning for that portion of the project was not completed at the same time as the rest of the project.

Each rebuilt station will be built to be DDA compliant as well as have improved shelter and facilities such as lifts. The bus interchanges at Oats Street and Cannington stations will be expanded.

== Projected patronage ==
Pre-upgrade figures were taken from 2019 as that was the last year before the COVID-19 pandemic.

Average weekday boardings per station
| Station | 2019 | 2031 |
|---|---|---|
| Carlisle | 482 | 733 |
| Oats Street | 1,766 | 3,916 |
| Welshpool | 365 | —N/a |
| Queens Park | 866 | 1,392 |
| Cannington | 2,910 | 4,778 |

== Planning ==
The project originated from an election promise by the Labor Party in the lead up to the 2017 Western Australian state election, promising to remove the Oats Street and Wharf Street level crossings among others as part of their proposed Metronet project.

The 2018–19 state budget included funding for planning to remove the Oats Street and Wharf Street level crossings. Preliminary planning for those removals identified that removing all the level crossings on the Armadale line between Victoria Park and Beckenham could be considered, so those level crossings were added to the project's scope in April 2019. The 2019–20 state budget had $415 million set aside for the project. $17.5 million was spent over the following year for the preparation of detailed designs and business cases. The 2019–20 federal budget had $207.5 million committed to the project.

Invitations for tender were released in September 2019 for the two components of the project.

In June 2020, the decision that a viaduct had been chosen as the method of level crossing removal was revealed. It had not yet been decided whether the Hamilton Street level crossing would be removed using the viaduct method or using a road-over-rail method. Transport Minister Rita Saffioti said the decision to go with a viaduct was inspired by the sky rail used in the Level Crossing Removal Project in Melbourne, but that this project would not require the acquisition of nearby houses as the rail reserve is wide.

The state government submitted a business case for the project to Infrastructure Australia in August 2020. In December 2020, Infrastructure Australia assessed the project as having a benefit-cost ratio of 0.36 and a net present value of negative $569 million, resulting in them not putting the project on their priority list. The report released by Infrastructure Australia stated that "the project is unlikely to deliver a productivity benefit to the economy" and that there is "limited evidence that the grade separations are the most cost-effective solution for addressing the identified problems".

Two consortia were shortlisted in January 2021 for the awarding of the construction contract. They were the Armadale Line Upgrade Alliance, consisting of Acciona Construction, BMD Constructions, WSP and AECOM, and the Elevate Alliance, consisting of Downer EDI Works, CPB Contractors, GHD, Aurecon Australasia, and CareyMC. In December 2021, the Armadale Line Upgrade Alliance was announced as the preferred proponent.

In February 2022, it was announced that an 18-month-long shutdown of the Armadale line would have to occur for the construction of the Victoria Park-Canning Level Crossing Removal Project, as well as the Byford extension and the Thornlie-Cockburn Link. This shutdown was planned to begin in early-2023, but was delayed to late-2023 in August 2022. In August 2023, it was announced the specific date for the start of the shutdown was 20 November 2023.

The Railway (METRONET) Amendment Bill 2022 was passed by the Parliament of Western Australia in March 2022, enabling the project to occur.

In April 2022, during the 2022 Australian federal election campaign, Labor leader Anthony Albanese committed $87.5 million of federal funding for the removal of the William Street level crossing and rebuild of Beckenham station, if elected. The state government committed $87.5 million as well, bringing the cost to $175 million. Saffioti stated that this portion would be completed during the 18-month shutdown alongside the rest of the project, and that the shutdown would not have to be extended.

The $701 million contract was signed with the Armadale Line Upgrade Alliance in August 2022. This did not include the $175 million for the William Street and Beckenham station portion of the project, with that to be included in the scope of the contract once planning for that is complete.

Designs for Queens Park and Cannington stations were revealed in March 2023.

== Construction ==
Early works commenced in August 2022 for the relocation of power lines along the rail corridor as well as other preparatory works.

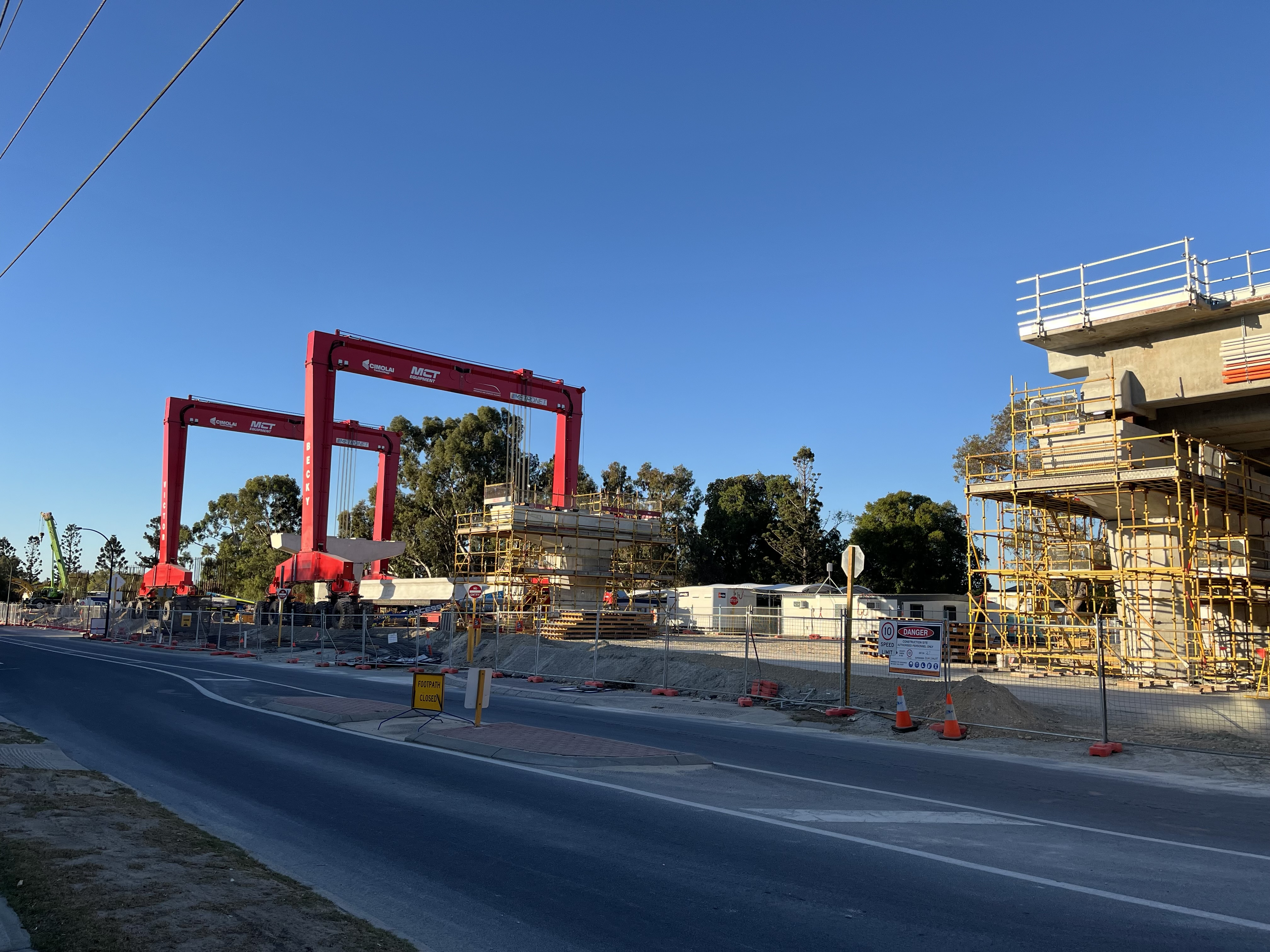
Two of the gantry cranes at the Oats Street station site in March 2024

By the end of 2022, the first of 530 precast concrete beams had been constructed. Six custom gantry cranes were built for the project, to be used to lift the concrete beams into place. The custom cranes will allow for a smaller construction site so that more vegetation can be retained. All concrete beams had been constructed by September 2023.

The 18-month shutdown commenced on 20 November 2023, after a Coldplay concert at Perth Stadium on 18 November and ATAR exams for year 12 students. Regular SmartRider users of the Armadale line in the six months leading up to 17 September 2023 initially received six months of free travel on Transperth services upon the shutdown's commencement, which was later extended to the reopening of the Armadale and Thornlie–Cockburn lines.

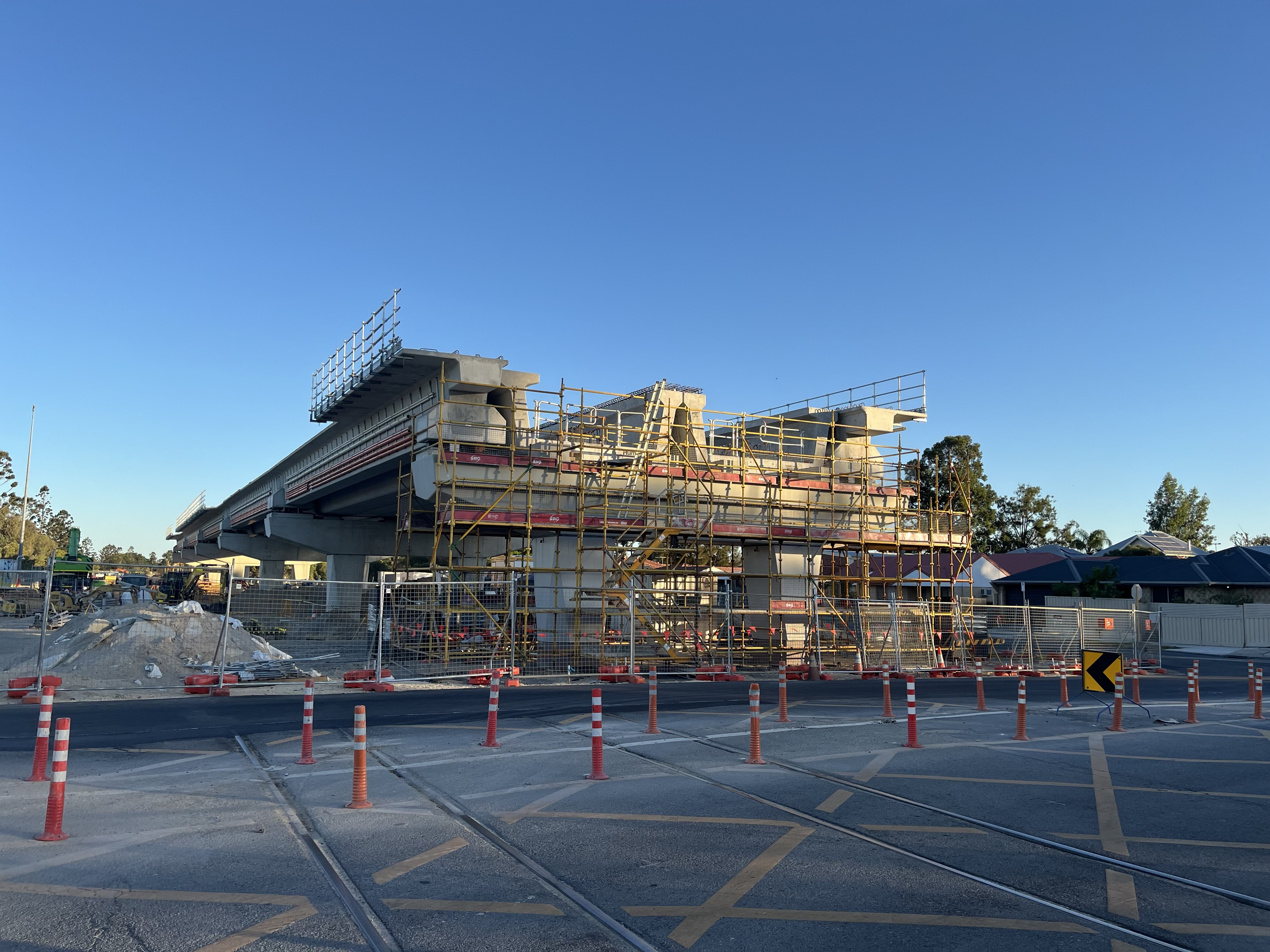
Viaduct beams in place at the Carlisle station site in March 2024, with the original tracks visible in the road in the foreground

In February 2024, the first viaduct beams were lifted into place at Carlisle station. By September 2024, the elevated rail structure was complete.

The first train ran on the new elevated rail on 20 January 2025, running from the Thornlie–Cockburn line to Carlisle station.

=== Bus priority works ===
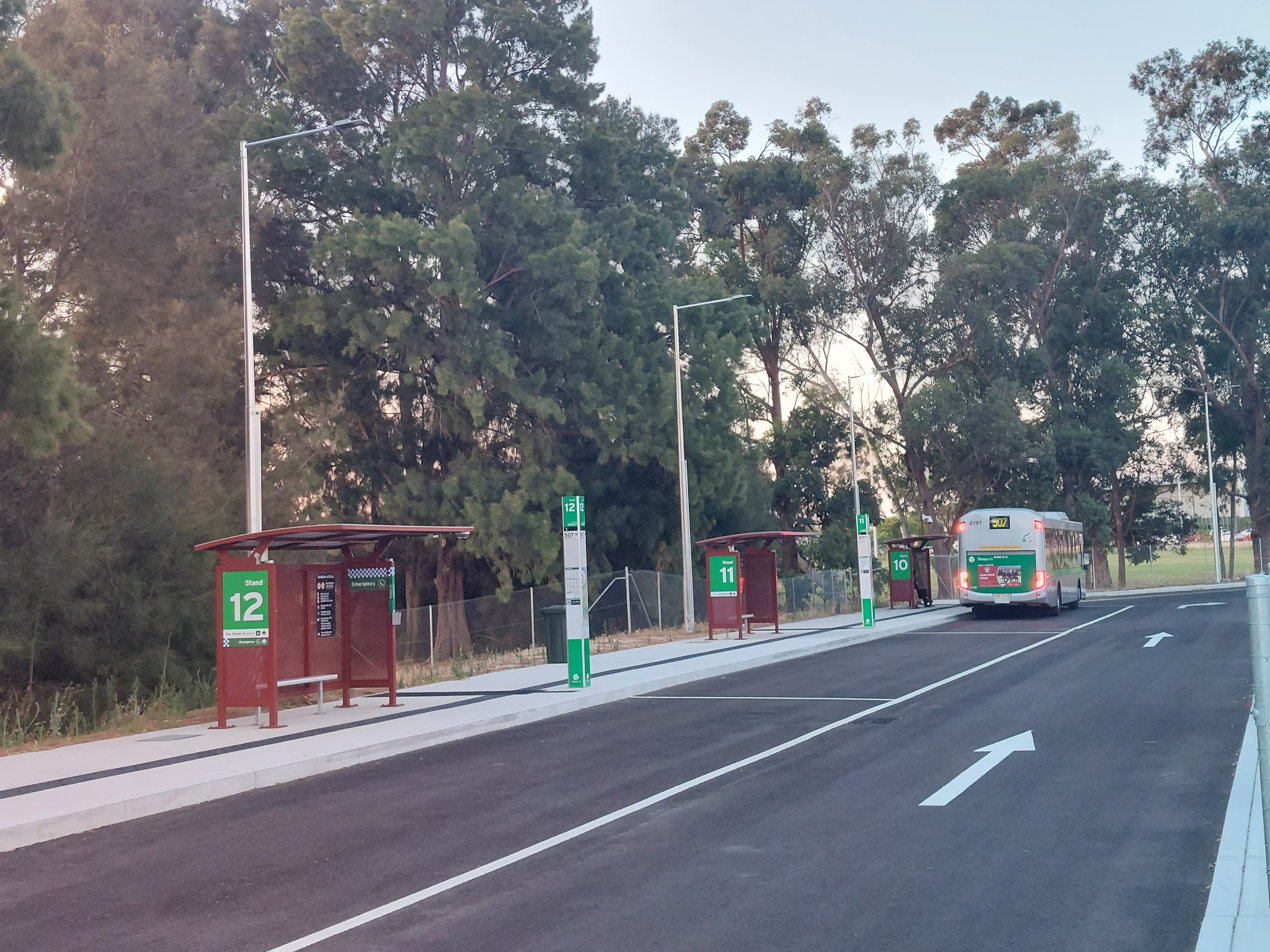
Temporary Cannington bus station

1.2 kilometres (0.75 mi) of bus lanes will be constructed along Albany Highway, Welshpool Road and Shepperton Road. Three temporary bus interchanges will be opened at Armadale, Victoria Park, and Cannington stations. More than 100 additional buses will be used for train replacement bus services. The Cannington bus interchange was scheduled to be complete in late July 2023, and the Victoria Park bus interchange was scheduled to be complete in October 2023.

=== Other works ===
Construction for the Thornlie–Cockburn Link, an extension of the Thornlie–Cockburn line, is planned to occur during the shutdown. This includes modifying Thornlie station to allow for through services and duplication of the tracks between Thornlie station and Beckenham junction. As part of the extension of the Armadale line to Byford, Armadale station will be rebuilt as an elevated station during the shutdown. Other miscellaneous upgrades and maintenance to infrastructure between Armadale and Beckenham stations will occur during the shutdown.

=== Temporary train services ===
Armadale line services during the shutdown run between Perth and Victoria Park stations. A turnback siding was constructed south of Victoria Park station at the start of the shutdown. Trains run at 7.5 minute intervals during the day and 15 minute intervals in the evenings.

== Reception ==
Town of Victoria Park Mayor Karen Vernon criticised the decision to elevate the railway line, saying that underground rail, similar to the sinking of Subiaco station and surrounding railway, would be better. She said "it's not attractive, it doesn't enhance the character of an area like Victoria Park, we're inner city, we've got that wonderful mix of old character homes and newer developments. Having something like that would be a blight on our area." However the transport minister said that putting the rail underground would have cost three times as much.

Shadow Transport Minister Shane Love has criticised the 18-month shutdown, saying that "anybody that thinks that this program will be delivered in 18 months, I think is delusional". Shadow Metronet Minister Tjorn Sibma has said that people would likely drive instead of catching the replacement buses, predicting that there would be an extra 7,000 to 8,000 cars on the road during the shutdown. He has also expressed doubt that the 18-month timeframe would not expand.

Curtin University senior lecturer in urban and regional planning Courtney Babb has criticised the shutdown, saying it will cause "mass disruption" for questionable benefit.

Peter Martinovich, a retired Public Transport Authority executive director, has criticised the 18-month-long shutdown, saying it would inevitably increase in cost and time. He said that "the decision to close the existing railway service for at least 18 months, but more likely three years, and to spend a lot of money on a replacement bus service whilst leaving valuable railway rolling stock idle is a disgrace". He said the decision to go with one long shutdown as opposed to multiple shorter shutdowns favoured the contractor and project managers at the expense of patrons. Martinovich also said that the Armadale line should be tunnelled instead of elevated.

Grattan Institute transport and cities program director Marion Terrill compared the length of this shutdown to the much shorter shutdowns on Melbourne's Level Crossing Removal Project, saying "even that has been quite disruptive with buses replacing trains".
