= Perth Station =

ESA tracking station in Australia

Coordinates: 31.8025°S 115.8852°E

Perth Station was an ESTRACK Earth station in Australia, located at the Perth International Telecommunications Centre in the suburb of Cullacabardee. It has been retired from service in December, 2015 and has been replaced by the New Norcia Station.

The site has hosted a 15-metre diameter antenna that transmitted in S-band and received in both S- and X-bands.

There were plans to upgrade to X-band transmission in 2004. There was also a GPS Tracking and Data Facility. The site had its own no-break power plant.

The facility was used to routinely communicate with the XMM-Newton spacecraft. It was also used during the Launch and Early Orbit Phase of various satellite launches.
