= Armadale railway station, Perth =

Railway station in Perth, Western Australia

Armadale
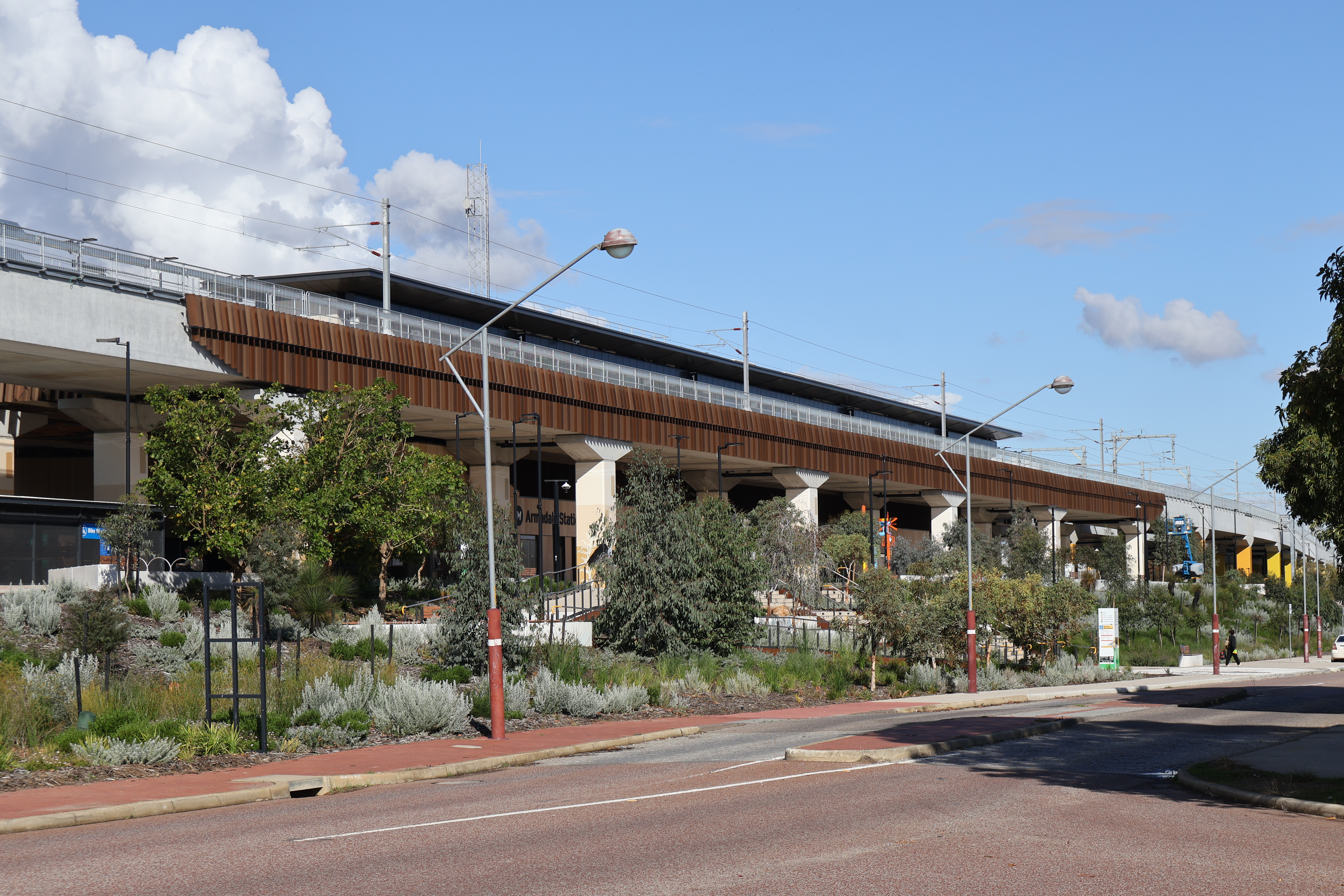
- Armadale station in 2026, viewed from Green Avenue

General information
- Location: Armadale, Western Australia; Australia
- Coordinates: 32°09′12″S 116°00′47″E
- System: Transperth; Transwa
- Operator: Public Transport Authority
- Lines: Armadale line; Australind
- Distance: 30.0 kilometres (18.6 mi) from Perth
- Platforms: 3 (1 island, 1 side)
- Tracks: 3
- Bus routes: 11 regular; 2 train replacement
- Bus stands: 10

Construction
- Structure type: Elevated
- Accessible: Yes

Other information
- Station code: AAE; 99191 (platform 1); 99192 (platform 2); 99193 (platform 3)
- Fare zone: 4

History
- Opened: 2 May 1893
- Rebuilt: Early 1990s; 2004; 2025

Passengers
- 2013-14: 497,748

Services
| Preceding station | Transperth | Following station |
|---|---|---|
| Sherwood towards Perth | Armadale line | Byford Terminus |
| Preceding station | Transwa | Following station |
| Perth Terminus | Australind | Byford towards Bunbury |
Location
- Location of Armadale railway station

Armadale railway station is a suburban and regional railway station, located on the South Western Railway 30 kilometres (19 mi) from Perth station serving the suburbs of Armadale, Brookdale and Haynes. The station was reopened on 12 October 2025 after being rebuilt as part of the Byford Extension project. Prior to this, Armadale station served as the terminus of the Armadale line. The station is served by Transperth Armadale line services as well as by the Transwa Australind which resumed services on the 29 June 2026.

== History ==
The original station opened on 2 May 1893 when the South Western Railway opened from Claisebrook to Pinjarra.

On 15 July 1907, Armadale became a junction station when the Spearwood–Armadale line opened. This line closed on 23 January 1964.

=== 1990s and 2004 rebuild ===
As part of the electrification of the line in the early 1990s, a new station was built with the former signal box relocated to the Armadale Tourist Centre. On 6 November 2004, another new, more substantial station opened slightly further north with an electrified through platform and bay platform.

=== 2020s rebuild ===
As a part of the Metronet Byford Rail Extension project, the Armadale Road, Forrest Avenue and Church Avenue railway crossings were removed by elevating the rail on a viaduct, and road-over-rail bridges built to replace the Eleventh Road and Thomas Road crossings. The pedestrian crossings at Frys Lane and Seventh Road were rebuilt, going under the elevated rail. The elevated rail starts approximately 450 metres north of Armadale Road, and will continue until returning to ground level, around 420 metres south of Church Avenue.

Elevating the rail through Armadale involved building a new elevated Armadale station. The existing station was demolished starting with the platforms on 11 December 2023 and then the terminal building on 13 December, leading to the station being fully demolished by 15 December. The new station is a more modern design with lifts, escalators, three platforms (two urban and one regional), a bus interchange (including a dedicated stop for Transwa coaches) as well as 8 hectares of new public space beneath the elevated tracks. The Armadale line and Australind service closed for 18 months to allow construction to take place, starting on 20 November 2023. The new station and extension to Byford opened on 12 October 2025. The Australind service resumed on 29 June 2026.

== Services ==
Armadale station is served by Transperth Armadale Line services. It is also served by Transwa Australind services to Bunbury. For a time, The Australind did stop at Kelmscott, however this was reverted in April 1992.

The station saw 497,748 passengers in the 2013-14 financial year.

Armadale platform arrangement
| Stop ID | Platform | Line | Destination | Via | Stopping Pattern | Notes |
|---|---|---|---|---|---|---|
| 99191 | 1 | Armadale line | Perth | | All stations | |
| 99192 | 2 | Australind | Perth | | Limited express services | Platform can be used by Transperth electrified services when necessary |
| 99192 | 2 | Australind | Bunbury | | All stations | Platform can be used by Transperth electrified services when necessary |
| 99193 | 3 | Armadale line | Byford | | All stations | |

== Bus routes ==
| Stop | Route | Destination / description | Notes |
|---|---|---|---|
| Stand 1 | | Set Down | |
| Stand 2 | | Set Down | |
| Stand 3 | 249 | to Helbert via Rowley Road | |
| Stand 3 | 251 | to Byford Station via South Western Highway | |
| Stand 4 | 907 | Rail replacement service to Perth Station | |
| Stand 4 | 686 | to Crown Perth, Burswood | |
| Stand 4 | | School Specials | |
| Stand 5 | GS1 | Transwa Coach Services to East Perth | |
| Stand 5 | GS1 | Transwa Coach Services to Albany | |
| Stand 5 | | School Bus Services | |
| Stand 6 | 219 | to Kelmscott Station via Armadale Kelmscott Hospital | |
| Stand 6 | 220 | to Perth Busport via Albany Highway | |
| Stand 7 | 519 | to Murdoch Station via Armadale Road, Nicholson Road & Southacre Drive | |
| Stand 7 | 529 | to Cockburn Central Station via Armadale Road | |
| Stand 8 | 246 | to Hilbert via Forrest Road | |
| Stand 8 | 250 | Armadale to Wungong Circular Service | |
| Stand 9 | 243 | to Kelmscott Station via Seville Drive | |
| Stand 9 | 244 | to Kelmscott Station via Braemore Street | |
| Stand 10 | 245 | to Kelmscott Station via Westfield Road | |

Armadale is also served by Transwa services to Perth Coach Terminal, Albany and Esperance.
