= Byford railway station =

Railway station in Western Australia

Byford
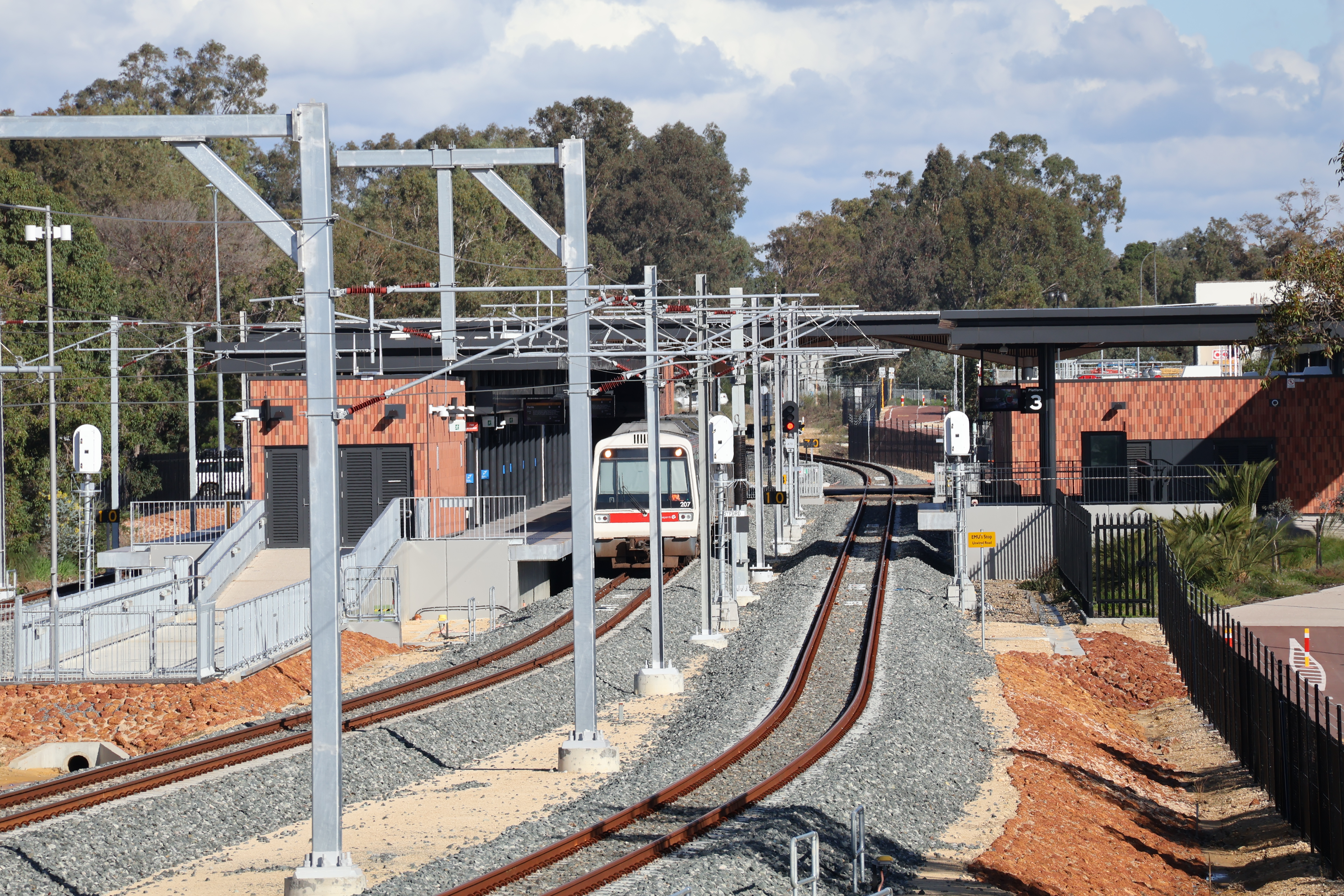
- Southbound view of the station, June 2026

General information
- Location: Pitman Way, Byford, Western Australia; Australia
- Coordinates: 32.2164°S 116.0073°E
- System: Transperth; Transwa
- Operator: Public Transport Authority
- Lines: Armadale line; Australind
- Platforms: 3
- Tracks: 3
- Bus stands: 6
- Connections: Buses; Regional coaches

Construction
- Structure type: Ground
- Parking: Approximately 400 bays
- Cycle facilities: Shelter for 100 bicycles
- Accessible: Yes

Other information
- Fare zone: 4

History
- Opened: May 1893
- Rebuilt: 12 October 2025
- Electrified: 2025
- Former names: Beenup

Services
Preceding station	Transperth	Following station
Armadale towards Perth	Armadale line	Terminus
Preceding station	Transwa	Following station
Armadale towards Perth	Australind	Mundijong towards Bunbury
Location
- Location of Byford railway station

Byford railway station is a railway station on the Transperth and Transwa networks serving the suburb of Byford in Perth, Western Australia. It is the southern terminus of the Armadale line, located 37.6 kilometres (23.4 mi) south-east of Perth railway station. It is also served by Australind regional services to Bunbury along the South Western Railway.

The station was relocated and added to Perth's suburban rail network in 2025. It expanded from a single-platform station served by four regional trains per day, to a combined suburban and regional train, bus and coach interchange in Byford's new town centre served by eight metropolitan trains per hour in peak periods, and four metropolitan trains off peak and on weekends. The new station opened on 12 October 2025.

== History ==
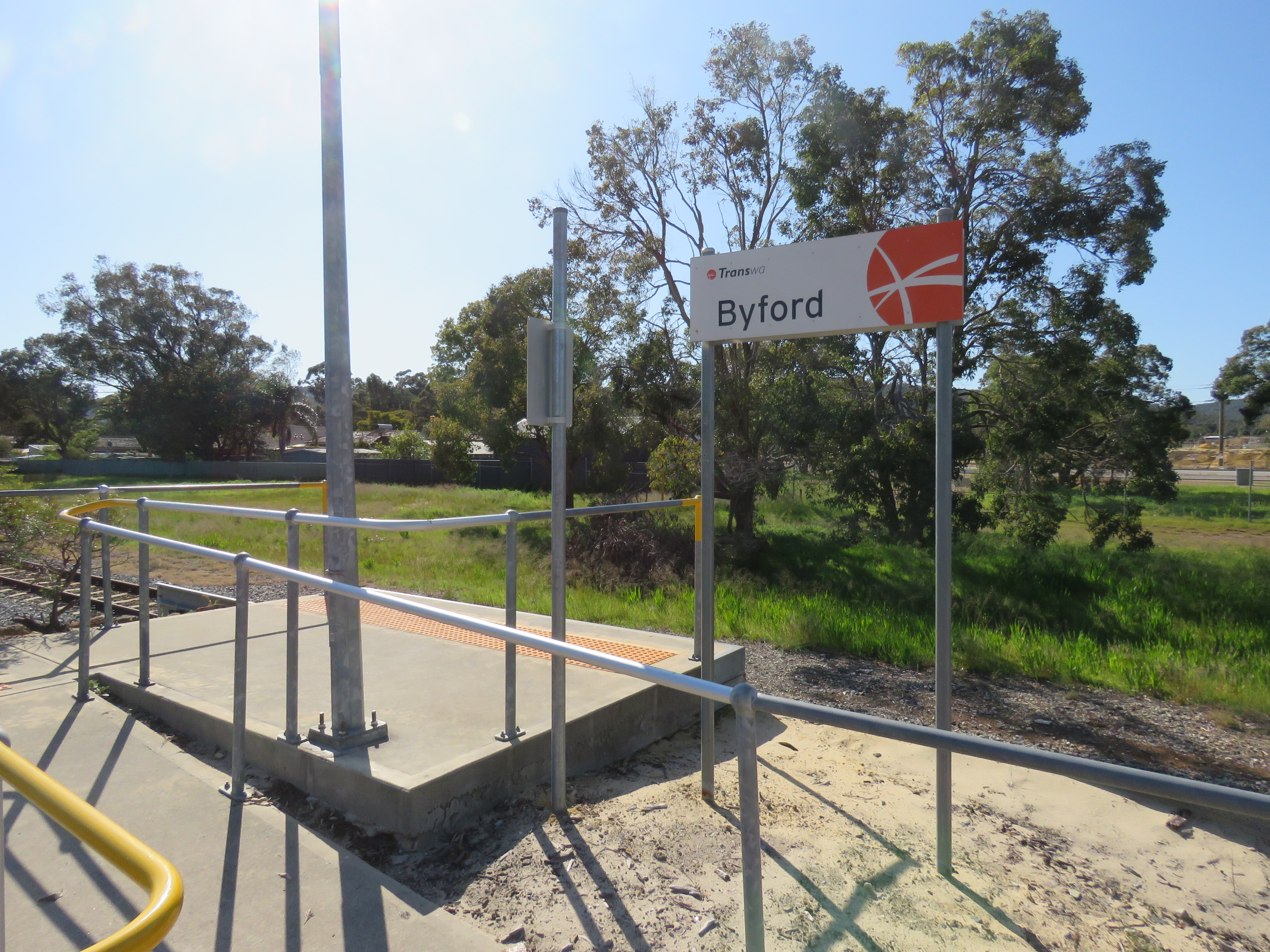
The 1990s Australind station in 2022

The original Byford station was opened as Beenup in May 1893. It was renamed in April 1920.

It was also the terminus for selected services from Perth, and location of sidings to the State Brickworks and Naval Ordinance Depot.

The station was staffed between 1912 and 1965, apart from a brief period of closure between 1916 and 1919. The station was demolished in the late 1980s. In the late 1990s, a new station was built approximately 400 metres (1,300 ft) south of Abernethy Road. Until 2023, it was served only by the Australind, a regional train to Bunbury.

=== Armadale line extension ===
As part of Metronet, it was announced that the Transperth Armadale line service would be extended to a new station in Byford, approximately 400 metres (1,300 ft) north of Abernethy Road.

The new station includes parking for approximately 400 cars, a new bus interchange and a pedestrian connection across the rail line. Additionally, several level crossings along the line between Armadale and Byford were removed as part of the project, including Thomas Road, which was replaced with a road-over-rail bridge, and Larsen Road, which was closed and replaced with a pedestrian bridge.

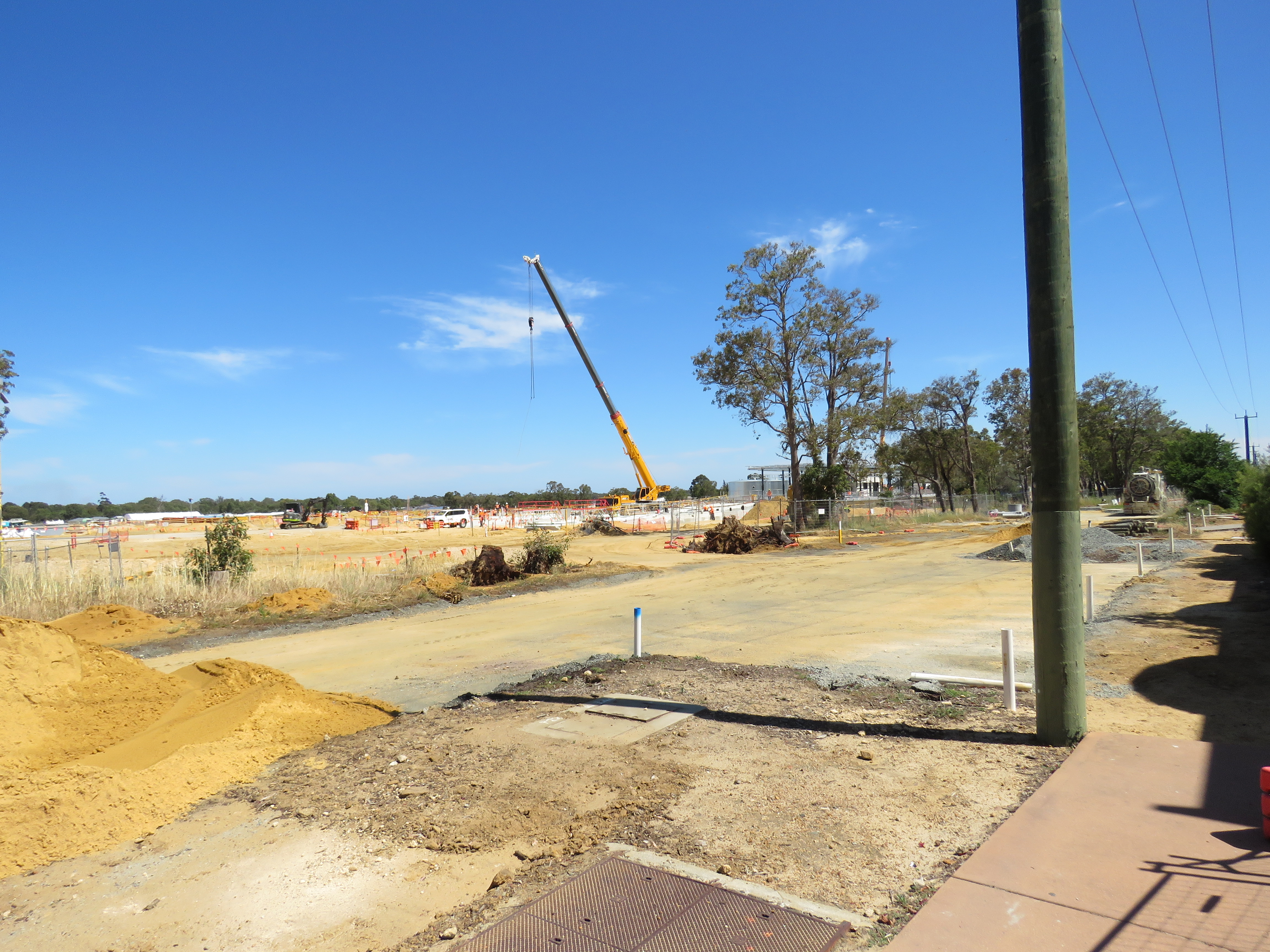
Construction of the new railway station in November 2024

On 19 November 2023, the final Australind service left Perth before the closure of the Armadale line between Victoria Park and Armadale (from 8 June 2025, between Cannington and Armadale). The line's temporary closure to the end of 2025 was to allow works for a level crossing removal project and extension of electrification to Byford; the existing Byford station was permanently closed and replaced with the new station which opened on 12 October 2025. Australind services resumed in June 2026 and use a dedicated platform at the new Byford station.

== Platforms ==
Byford platform arrangement
Stop ID	Platform	Line	Destination	Via	Stopping Pattern	Notes
99361	1	Armadale line	Perth		All stations	
99362	2	Armadale line	Perth		All stations	
95002	3	Australind	Perth		Limited express services	Platform cannot be used by Transperth services.
95002	3	Australind	Bunbury		All stations	Platform cannot be used by Transperth services.

== Bus routes ==
Byford railway station contains a bus and coach interchange with seven bus stands served by Transperth buses and Transwa coaches.

TP2019 Operating the Circular 255

Stop	Route	Destination / description	Notes
Stand 1 (No. 29280)	907	Train replacement to Perth	
Stand 1 (No. 29280)		Set down	
Stand 2 (No. 29281)	246	Armadale station via Forrest Road	Limited service
Stand 2 (No. 29281)	246	Byford Secondary College via Salvado Catholic College	Limited service
Stand 2 (No. 29281)	249	Armadale station via Rowley Road	Limited service
Stand 2 (No. 29281)	249	Byford Secondary College via Salvado Catholic College	Limited service
Stand 2 (No. 29281)	251	Armadale station via South Western Highway	
Stand 3 (No. 29282)	259	Mundijong town centre via Whitby	
Stand 3 (No. 29282)	262	Jarrahdale town centre via Whitby and Mundijong town centre	
Stand 4 (No. 29283)		Transwa coaches	
Stand 4 (No. 29283)		Transperth school specials	
Stand 4 (No. 29283)		School Bus Services (rural and remote)	
Stand 5 (No. 29284)	255	Byford station (anti-clockwise circular route) via Indigo Parkway and Kardan Boulevard	
Stand 6 (No. 29285)	254	Byford station (clockwise circular route) via Kardan Boulevard and Indigo Parkway	
Stand 7 (No. 29286)	256	Byford station (circular route) via Kokoda Boulevard	
