= List of State Register of Heritage Places in the Town of Victoria Park =

The State Register of Heritage Places is maintained by the Heritage Council of Western Australia. As of 2026, 146 places are heritage-listed in the Town of Victoria Park, of which nine are on the State Register of Heritage Places.

== List ==
The Western Australian State Register of Heritage Places, as of 2026, lists the following nine state registered places within the Town of Victoria Park:

Place name	Place #	Location	Suburb or town	Co-ordinates	Built	State registered	Notes	Photo
Old Burswood Canal	3570	near Goodwood Parade	Burswood	31°57′20″S 115°53′39″E	1831	24 September 2004	Remnants of one of the earliest public works projects carried out in what was then the Swan River Colony	
Edward Millen Home (former)	2176	15 Hill View Terrace	East Victoria Park	31°59′35″S 115°54′29″E	1912	29 June 1999	Also referred to as Hillview Clinic, Rotunda Maternity Hospital and Mildred Creak Centre; Built in the Federation Queen Anne style	
Kent Street Senior High School	3372	89 Kent Street	Kensington	31°59′08″S 115°53′34″E	1939	31 March 2006	Also referred to as Kent Street Central School and Kent Street High School; Built in the Inter-War Free Classical style with some Art Deco ornamentation	
Windmill & Wishing Well	3898	152 Albany Highway	Victoria Park	31°58′10″S 115°53′26″E	1939	20 October 2000	Also referred to as Brisbane + Wunderlich Windmill & Wishing Well; A rare example of a private enterprise outdoor landscaped product display on a public road reserve	
Victoria Park Primary School	3459	205 Albany Highway	Victoria Park	31°58′17″S 115°53′32″E	1894	27 February 1996	A rare example of a two-storey suburban school building	
Broken Hill Hotel	2220	306 & 326 Albany Highway	Victoria Park	31°58′22″S 115°53′46″E	1897	31 Mat 2013	Built in the Federation Free Classical style; Designed by Robert Thompson McMaster, first mayor of Victoria Park	
Victoria Park Post Office	2222	414-420 Albany Highway	Victoria Park	31°58′29″S 115°53′52″E	1913	10 October 1995	Built in the Federation Free style under chief architect Hillson Beasley	
Victoria Park Police Station	2219	450 Albany Highway	Victoria Park	31°58′33″S 115°53′54″E	1908	7 April 1998	Built in the Federation Free style under chief architect Hillson Beasley	
St Peter's Anglican Church & Memorial Hall	2225	11-15 Leonard Street	Victoria Park	31°58′29″S 115°53′45″E	1935	5 November 1999	A church built in the Inter-War Romanesque style	
