= Shepperton Road =

Road in Perth, Western Australia

Shepperton Road Western Australia

General information
- Type: Road
- Length: 3.8 km (2.4 mi)
- Opened: 1930s
- Route number(s): State Route 30

Major junctions
- Northwest end: The Causeway (State Route 5), Victoria Park
- Great Eastern Highway (National Highway 94 / National Route 1); Canning Highway (National Route 1 / State Route 6); Welshpool Road
- Southeast end: Albany Highway (State Route 30), St James

Location(s)
- Major suburbs: Burswood, East Victoria Park

Shepperton Road is a single carriageway four lane road in Perth, Western Australia.

Counterintuitively, the road provides a higher-capacity alternative for the northernmost section of Albany Highway due to the latter forming the high street of the busy inner south-eastern suburb of Victoria Park. The road therefore forms the northernmost section of State Route 30, with the bypassed section of Albany Highway unsigned as a result.

== History ==
Shepperton Road was noted as running parallel to the then-named Albany Road between Harvey Street, 45 chains (3,000 ft; 910 m) from The Causeway, and Somerset Street, one and a half miles (2.4 km) further along. In 1937, a road from Asquith Street to Albany Road was constructed, to eventually link in with Shepperton Road. In the same year, the intersection of Albany Road, Milford Street, and Welshpool Road was reconfigured to improve visibility, and in anticipation of an eastern extension to Shepperton Road. In April 1940, that extension was nearing completion, which was expected to be by the end of May, while the demolition of houses on land resumed for the western extension was being arranged. On 29 September 1941, the Perth City Council decided to construct the link between Asquith Street and Harvey Street early the following year, completing the Shepperton Road bypass. Buses were rerouted onto Shepperton Road in 1946, by which time it had become the preferred route for motorists.

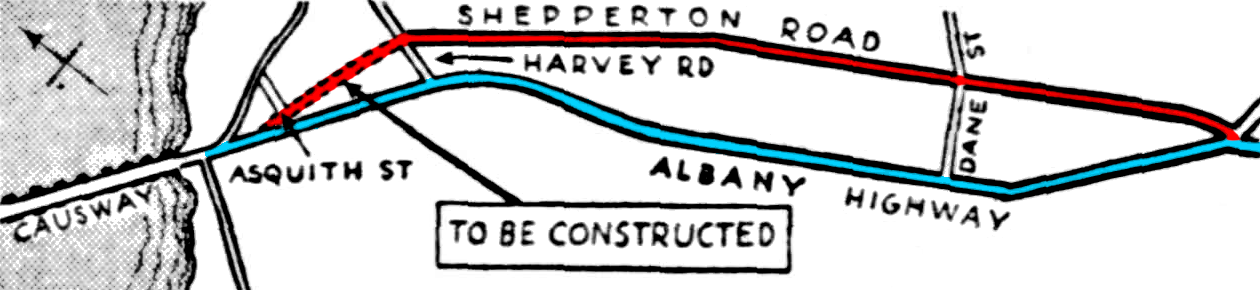
Shepperton Road (red) bypass of Albany Highway (blue). In September 1941 the section between Asquith Street and Harvey Street was yet to be constructed.

== Major intersections ==
All intersections listed below are controlled by traffic lights.

| LGA | Location | km | mi | Destinations | Notes |
|---|---|---|---|---|---|
| Victoria Park | Burswood–Victoria Park boundary | 0.0 | 0.0 | Great Eastern Highway northeast (National Highway 94 / Nation Route 1) – Rivervale, Midland, Perth Airport; Canning Highway southwest (National Route 1 / State Route 6) – Como, Fremantle; Albany Highway southeast. | Northern terminus at partially grade separated favouring Canning and Great Eastern Highways with no access into Albany Highway. Continues as The Causeway northwest (State Route 5); Canning Highway northeast bound to Shepperton Road is at-grade. No access from Shepperton Road to Great Eastern Highway northeast bound Pedestrian access to Causeway bus station |
| Victoria Park | Burswood–Victoria Park boundary | 0.4 | 0.25 | Teddington Road | Provides access from Shepperton Road to Great Eastern Highway northeast bound |
| Victoria Park | Victoria Park | 1.1 | 0.68 | Duncan Street | Access to Victoria Park railway station |
| Victoria Park | Victoria Park-East Victoria Park boundary | 1.8 | 1.1 | Miller Street – Lathlain, Bentley, Curtin University | |
| Victoria Park | East Victoria Park | 2.2 | 1.4 | Mint Street – Carlisle | Access to Carlisle railway station |
| Victoria Park | East Victoria Park | 3.4 | 2.1 | Oats Street – Kewdale, Carlisle, St James, Bentley | Access to Oats Street railway station. No right turn permitted from Oats Street east to Shepperton Road south |
| Victoria Park–Canning boundary | East Victoria Park–St James boundary | 3.8 | 2.4 | Albany Highway north / Welshpool Road east – Perth, East Cannington, Welshpool | Southern termius; continues as Albany Highway (State Route 30) southeast bound. No right turns allowed from Shepperton Road to Albany Highway northwest bound or Albany Highway to Welshpool Road. |
1.000 mi = 1.609 km; 1.000 km = 0.621 mi: Incomplete access; Note: Intersections with minor local roads are not shown
