= East Victoria Park, Western Australia =

East Victoria Park
- Suburb
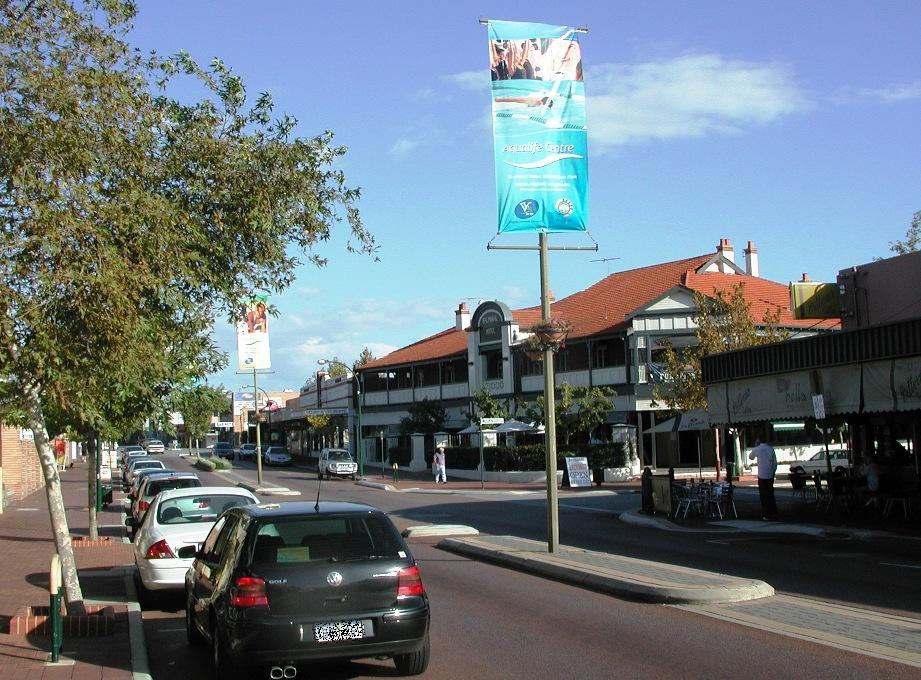
- Albany Highway running through the centre of East Victoria Park
- Interactive map of East Victoria Park
- Coordinates: 31.988°S 115.904°E
- Country: Australia
- State: Western Australia
- City: Perth
- LGA: Town of Victoria Park
- Location: 6 km (3.7 mi) from Perth
- Established: 1890s

Government
  - State electorate: Victoria Park and South Perth
  - Federal division: Swan

Area
  - Total: 4 km^{2} (1.5 sq mi)

Population
  - Total: 10,569 (SAL 2021)
- Postcode: 6101
Suburbs around East Victoria Park
Victoria Park; Kensington	Victoria Park; Lathlain	Carlisle
Kensington	East Victoria Park	Carlisle; Welshpool
Bentley	Bentley; St James	St James

East Victoria Park (nicknamed East Vic Park) is an inner south-eastern suburb of Perth, Western Australia, located within the Town of Victoria Park.

East Victoria Park is located south-east of the suburb of Victoria Park, approximately 5 kilometres (3.1 mi) from the Perth central business district. It is primarily residential but includes a continuation of the Albany Highway commercial strip, becoming a restaurant hotspot for Perth residents. It is bounded by the Armadale-Thornlie railway line to the north-east and shares Carlisle and Oats Street railway stations with the neighbouring suburb of Carlisle.

== Landmarks ==
East Victoria Park includes the Edward Millen Home (originally the Rotunda Hospital), a complex of buildings in the Federation Queen Anne architectural style. The precinct is listed on the State Register of Heritage Places.

In 1911, the Australian Aborigines Mission established the Dulhi Gunyah home for Noongar children on the corner of Kent Street and Jarrah Road. The home was closed in 1916 and the children were moved to the Carrolup Native Settlement. The facility was later purchased by the Methodist Church and was used as a children's home for wards of the state. It was renamed Mofflyn in 1959 and became part of the Uniting Church. It was eventually demolished and cleared, with the Victoria Heights residential estate constructed on the site in the late 1990s.

== History ==
East Victoria Park was opened for residential subdivision in the early 1900s, with early housing estates including Bickford Estate, Brixton Township, Canterbury Park, Canning Park, Hillcrest Estate and Balmoral Estate. Development was spurred by the extension of the Perth tramways in 1905, with the line running down what is now Albany Highway. It was extended to a terminus at Patricia Street in 1934, and during World War II was further extended to a munitions factory on Welshpool Road. The tramways were closed in 1950 and replaced with bus services.

A railway station on the South Western Railway was opened at Mint Street in 1912 – originally named East Victoria Park station but renamed Carlisle station in 1919. This was joined by Oats Street station further to the east in 1954.

After World War II, bushland to the west of Berwick Street adjoining the Collier Pine Plantation was opened for residential subdivision. This area was originally known as the Millen Estate and included a number of war service homes. Many residents found work in the Welshpool industrial area. New schools were built in the 1950s, including Millen Primary School and St. Francis Xavier College (now part of Ursula Frayne Catholic College), while East Victoria Park Primary School was relocated to its present site in 1977.

== Transport ==
=== Bus ===
- 37 Oats Street Station to Airport Central Station
- 38 Perth Busport to Cloverdale – serves Shepperton Road and Mint Street
- 72 Elizabeth Quay Bus Station to Cannington Station – serves Berwick Street, Sussex Street, Etwell Street, Pinedale Street and Jarrah Road
- 73 Elizabeth Quay Bus Station to Ranford Road Station – serves Berwick Street, Sussex Street, Etwell Street, Pinedale Street and Jarrah Road
- 220 Perth Busport to Armadale Station – serves Albany Highway
- 222 Curtin University Bus Station to Cannington Station – serves Jarrah Road
- 282 and 283 Oats Street Station to Kalamunda Bus Station – serve Shepperton Road, Oats Street, Oats Street Station and Milford Street
- 284 Curtin University Bus Station to Belmont Forum – serves Jarrah Road, Albany Highway, Dane Street and Mint Street
- 285 Oats Street Station to Kewdale – serves Albany Highway, Oats Street, Shepperton Road and Oats Street Station
- 960 Curtin University Bus Station to Mirrabooka Bus Station (high frequency) – serves Kent Street
- 998 Fremantle Station to Fremantle Station (limited stops) – CircleRoute Clockwise, serves Oats Street, Oats Street Station, Hill View Terrace and Jarrah Road
- 999 Fremantle Station to Fremantle Station (limited stops) – CircleRoute Anti-Clockwise, serves Jarrah Road, Hill View Terrace, Oats Street and Oats Street Station

Bus routes serving Albany Highway, Basinghall Street and Berwick Street:

- 176 Elizabeth Quay Bus Station to Oats Street Station
- 177 Elizabeth Quay Bus Station to Cannington Station
- 178 and 179 Elizabeth Quay Bus Station to Bull Creek Station

Bus routes serving Shepperton Road:

- 930 Elizabeth Quay Bus Station to Thornlie Station (high frequency)

=== Rail ===
- Armadale Line
- Thornlie–Cockburn Line
  - Carlisle railway station
  - Oats Street railway station
