= Queen's Park station =

Queen's Park station can refer to:

- Queen's Park station (England), a station on the London Underground's Bakerloo line and the Watford DC line
- Queens Park railway station (Scotland), a station in Glasgow
- Queen's Park station (Toronto), a subway station in Toronto, Canada
- Queens Park railway station, Perth
