= Carlisle, Western Australia =

Carlisle
- Suburb
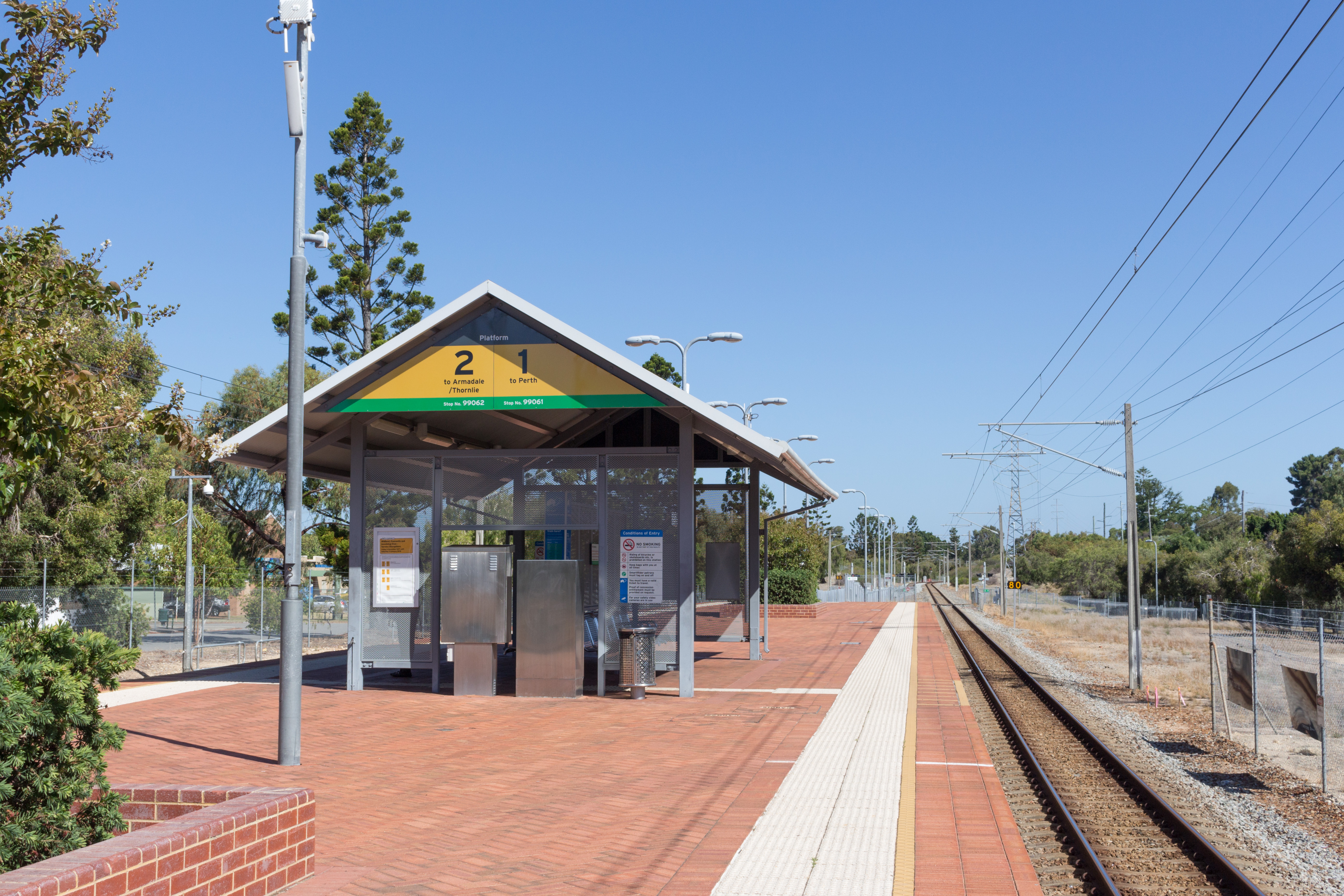
- Carlisle railway station, before it was closed for upgrading
- Interactive map of Carlisle
- Coordinates: 31.977°S 115.916°E
- Country: Australia
- State: Western Australia
- City: Perth
- LGA: Town of Victoria Park

Government
  - State electorate: Victoria Park
  - Federal division: Swan

Area
  - Total: 2.6 km^{2} (1.0 sq mi)

Population
  - Total: 6,733 (SAL 2021)
- Postcode: 6101
Suburbs around Carlisle
Lathlain	Rivervale	Kewdale
East Victoria Park	Carlisle	Welshpool
Karawara	Bentley	Queens Park

Carlisle is a suburb of Perth, Western Australia. Its local government area is the Town of Victoria Park.

== History ==
The suburb known as Carlisle today was originally settled as part of a land allocation to early Western Australian settlers after 1829. Swan Location 35 was granted to Henry Camfield and Canning Location 2 was granted to James Macdermott, and these land allocations made up the suburb as well as many of the surrounding suburbs.

Despite several changes of land ownership in the area little development was made until after the 1890s. The neighbouring suburb of Victoria Park experienced rapid growth around this time that was mostly focused around Albany Road (later to become Albany Highway). This growth eventually spread east as part of the Bickford development. Bickford was a name chosen by real estate company Peet and Co (now Peet Limited) for the sale of residential land in the area. On 23 May 1919, a meeting of ratepayers in the area elected to change the name of the suburb to Carlisle.

Bickford State School (renamed Carlisle Primary School in 1922) was opened in 1919, and this was followed by a Methodist church in 1927 and then a Catholic church in 1937. Other infrastructure soon followed.

== Geography ==
Carlisle is bordered by Orrong Road to the north, Briggs/Planet/Kew streets to the east, Rutland Avenue and the Armadale railway line to the south, and Roberts Road to the west.

The suburb is located within the "Bassendean Dunes" soil type of the Swan Coastal Plain and is mainly flat with occasional gentle undulations between its low areas in the west and its high areas in the east. The lowest point in Carlisle is 13.3 metres (44 ft) above mean sea level (AMSL) and located at 31°58′32″S 115°54′35″E on Bishopsgate Street at Koolbardi Park, while the highest point is 27.1 metres (89 ft) AMSL and located at 31°59′15″S 115°55′20″E near the intersection of Raleigh Street and Briggs Street. Here, a minor ridgeline heads in a north/south direction connecting two other high points in Carlisle at 23.6 metres (77 ft) AMSL at 31°59′05″S 115°55′20″E near the intersection of Planet Street and Cohn Street and 22.8 metres (75 ft) AMSL at 31°58′51″S 115°55′12″E near the intersection of Mars Street and Mercury Street. The last remaining high point at 21.6 metres (71 ft) AMSL is located in the west-end of the suburb at 31°58′24″S 115°54′58″E near the intersection of Weston Street and Archer Street. The high points in Carlisle offer glimpses of the nearby Perth CBD and Burswood skylines.

Streets in Carlisle are constructed in the traditional grid formation representative of the early planning style of Perth. The typical width of a road reservation in Carlisle is 20 metres (66 ft). The reservation consists of a footpath on at least one side (some streets have paths on both sides), 4-metre-wide (13 ft) landscaped verges and a 7-metre-wide (23 ft) carriageway that can support on-street parking and the passing of vehicles.

Most of the streets in Carlisle are lined with established trees. Common tree species for the suburb include:

- Lophostemon confertus (Queensland Box) - Archer St, Bishopsgate St, Mars St
- Jacaranda mimosifolia - Raleigh St, Planet St, Roberts Rd, Oats St
- Agonis flexuosa (Weeping Peppermint) - Star St
- Platanus × hispanica (London plane) - Archer St
- Callistemon vimnalis (Weeping Bottlebrush) - Bishopsgate St, Gemini Wy,
- Melaleuca saligna (Willow bottlebrush) - Planet St, Mars St
- Melaleuca linarifolia (Snow in Summer) - Mars St
- Celtis australis (European Nettle Tree) - Weston St
- Ficus microcarpa (Chinese Banyan) - Oats St
- Bauhinia purpurea (Purple Orchard Tree) - Lion St

== Facilities ==
There are five parks: Fletcher Park, Carlisle Reserve, Parnham Park, Koolbardi Park and Millers Crossing. The Carlisle Hotel and TAB are opposite Carlisle train station. Other facilities include Holy Name Primary School, Lathlain Nursing Home, Windsor Park Nursing Home, Harold Hawthorne Seniors Centre, Town of Victoria Park Council Depot, and the City of Belmont Operations Centre.

== Transport ==
Carlisle is home to both Oats Street railway station and Carlisle railway station and is served by the Armadale and Thornlie-Cockburn Lines. Both stations were closed from November 2023 to June 2025 as part of Metronet. The upgrades modernised the stations by elevating the rail via a concrete viaduct. Both stations are considered a bus Interchange with several routes serving the stations. Two of the routes, 999 and 998, are the Circular route which operates between many other stations across the Transperth network. There are also other routes that serve Oats Street railway station including routes 282 and 283 to Kalamunda bus station and also route 37 that runs to Airport Central railway station, and finally route 285 to Kewdale. Carlisle railway station has two bus routes, the 38 between Perth Busport and Cloverdale, and the 284 between Curtin University bus station and Belmont Forum Shopping Centre.

=== Bus ===
- 37 Oats Street Station to Airport Central Station
- 38 Perth Busport to Cloverdale – serves Archer Street and Carlisle Station
- 39 Elizabeth Quay Bus Station to Redcliffe Station – serves Star Street and Oats Street
- 51 Perth Busport to Cannington Station – serves Orrong Road
- 282 and 283 Oats Street Station to Kalamunda Bus Station
- 284 Curtin University Bus Station to Belmont Forum – serves Archer Street, Carlisle Station and Star Street
- 285 Oats Street Station to Kewdale – serves Oats Street and Orrong Road
- 998 Fremantle Station to Fremantle Station (limited stops) – CircleRoute Clockwise, serves Orrong Road and Oats Street
- 999 Fremantle Station to Fremantle Station (limited stops) – CircleRoute Anti-Clockwise, serves Oats Street and Orrong Road

=== Rail ===
- Armadale Line
- Thornlie-Cockburn Line
  - Carlisle Station
  - Oats Street Station

== Senior and tertiary education ==
Carlisle contains one technical and further education college, South Metropolitan TAFE – Carlisle Campus.
