= CircleRoute =

Bus routes in Perth, Australia

996 / 997 / 998 / 999

Overview
- System: Transperth

Route
- Start: Fremantle station
- Via: Murdoch station Curtin University bus station Oats Street station Bayswater station Galleria Bus Station; Stirling station Shenton Park station University of WA; Claremont Station
- End: Fremantle station
- Length: 84 kilometres

Service
- Level: Daily
- Journey time: 3 hours 30 minutes

The CircleRoute is a series of Transperth bus routes that form a circular shape through Perth's suburbs.

== History ==
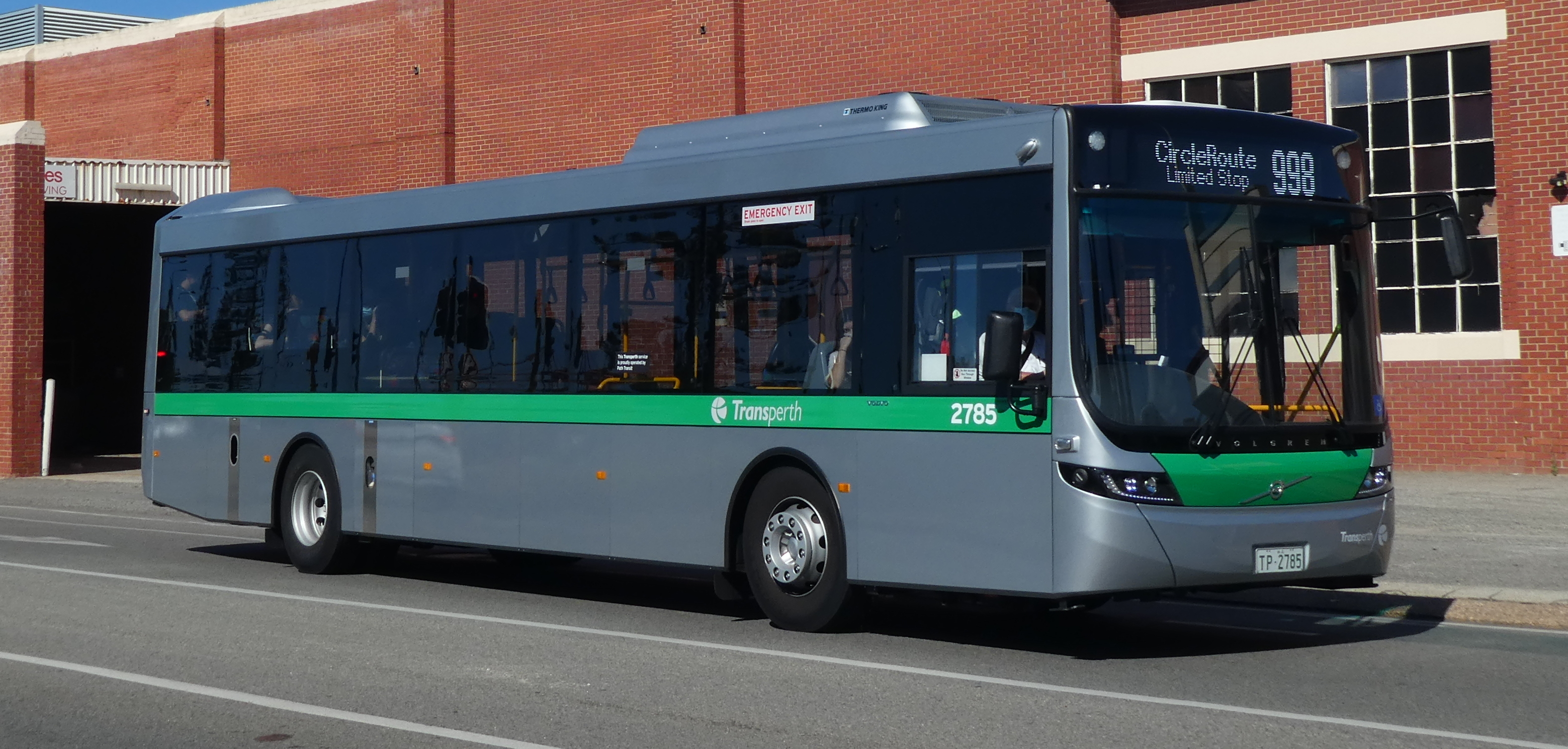
Volgren bodied Volvo B8RLE on route 998

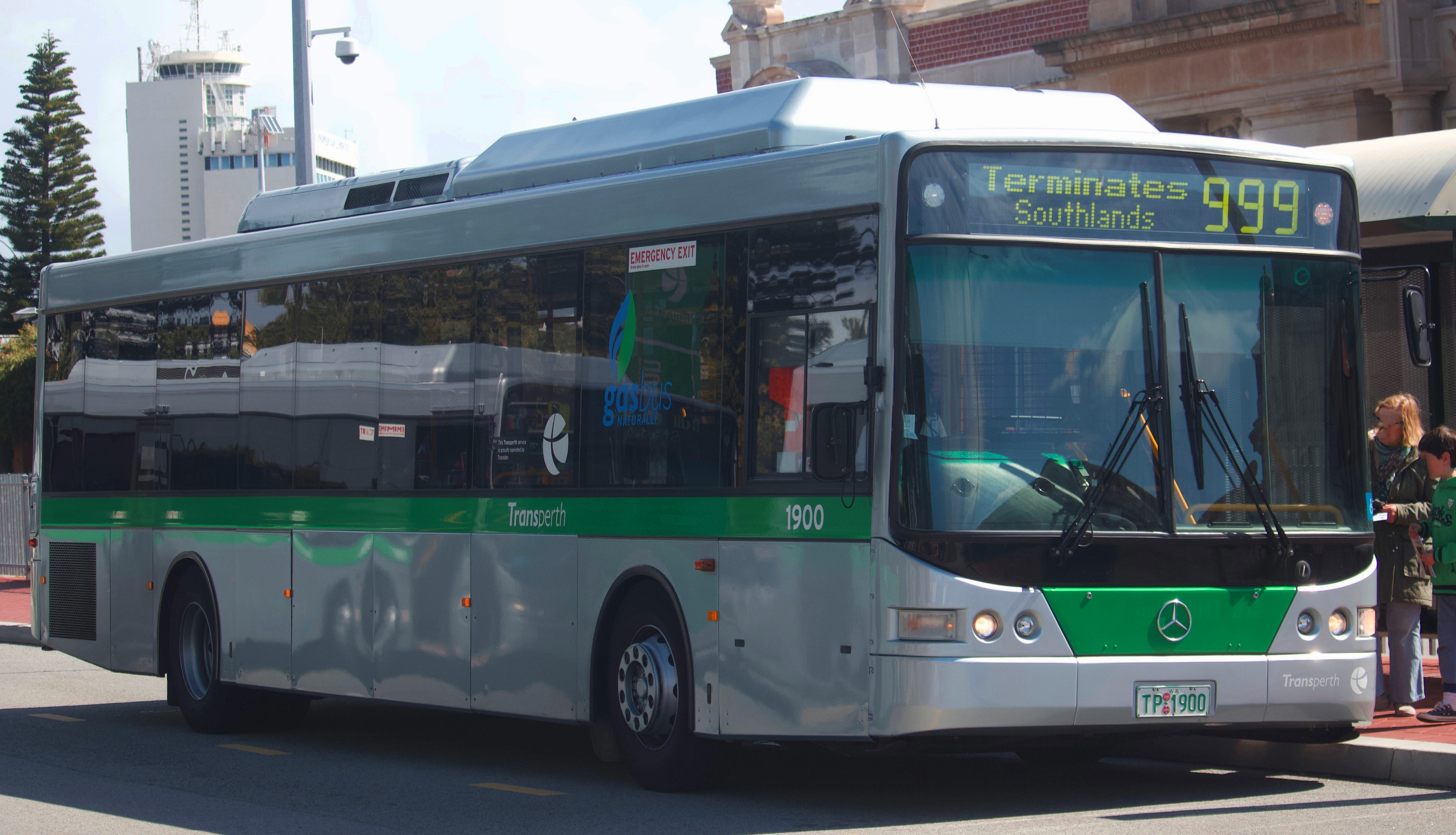
Volgren bodied Mercedes-Benz OC 500 LE on route 999

The CircleRoute was introduced in two stages. On 16 February 1998, the first stage of the CircleRoute commenced operating between Fremantle and Oats Street stations via Murdoch station. It was operated by Swan Transit with Mercedes-Benz O305 buses in a special livery with purple bands blended into the green blocks of the standard colour scheme, with an elliptical shaped logo featuring two arrows in white.

On 22 February 1999, the route was extended to become a 133 stop, 84 kilometre circular route. All four Perth contractors; Path Transit, Perth Bus, Southern Coast Transit and Swan Transit, operated services. In December 2000, the services began operating daily with the introduction of a Sunday service.

Prior to the CircleRoute's introduction, Perth had limited cross-suburban routes, with most of the network focused on transporting people towards the Perth central business district, and to a lesser extent, regional centres such as Fremantle. Projected patronage on the CircleRoute before its introduction indicated significant patronage over most of its route, aside from the section through Belmont, which had only modest predicted patronage.

The CircleRoute was designed so that for each section of the route, the route distance is less than 10% over the shortest road distance between two points. The CircleRoute is a limited stops route, meaning it does not stop at every bus stop along its route. The average stop spacing is 500 metres (1,600 ft).

The routes were renumbered from 98 and 99 to 998 and 999 on 31 January 2016, as to signify being a part of Transperth's premium, high-frequency services.

From April 2016 to March 2017, each direction of the CircleRoute had two million to three million yearly boardings, making the CircleRoute the second and third most used Transperth bus route, after the 950 bus route from Galleria bus station to QEII Medical Centre.

In the middle of 2023, the CircleRoute operated on a temporary alignment to serve Meltham Station whilst awaiting the completion of the new Bayswater Station. This change has since between reverted following the station’s reopening.

On 1 February 2026, the service was split into two routes, with buses running between Fremantle Station and Galleria Bus Station. Passengers would need to change buses at Galleria Bus Station to continue their journey. Despite this change, the route numbers stayed the same, with 998 running clockwise, and 999 running counter-clockwise.

On 1 November 2026, coinciding with the opening of the new Fremantle Traffic Bridge, the CircleRoute routes 998 and 999 will be withdrawn, replaced with four bi-directional routes, in order "to improve reliability and minimise late running following customer feedback":

- 996 operating between Fremantle Station and Stirling Station
- 997 operating between Stirling Station and Galleria Bus Station
- 998 operating between Galleria Bus Station and Curtin University Bus Station
- 999 operating between Curtin University Bus Station and Fremantle Station

While the routes will not be circular bus routes, they have retained the CircleRoute branding.

== Fares ==
Since 25 November 2007, fares have been determined according to the same Transperth zonal system used by other bus routes and trains in the region; prior to that date, the CircleRoute used its own distinct zones. Since the beginning of 2026 a ‘Go Anywhere’ fare was introduced across the entire Transperth network. A ride anywhere along the entire CircleRoute will now cost no more than $3.50 or $1.60 for Concession. These fares are reduced by 10% when using a SmartRider and 20% when using a SmartRider with auto load.

== Route ==
CircleRoute map

== Major bus stops ==
Location	Zone	Serving suburbs	Served by route	Transfers
CircleRoute
Fremantle station	2	Fremantle	999	, Fremantle line
Stock Road	2	O'Connor, Samson	999	
Murdoch University	2	Murdoch	999	
Murdoch station	2	Murdoch	999	, Mandurah line
Southlands Boulevarde	2	Willetton	999	
Curtin University bus station	1	Bentley	998, 999	Bus interchange
Oats Street station	1	Carlisle, East Victoria Park	998	, Armadale line, Thornlie–Cockburn line
Belmont Forum	1	Belmont, Cloverdale	998	
Ascot Racecourse	1	Ascot	998	
Bayswater station	1	Bayswater	998	, Airport line, Midland line, Ellenbrook line
Galleria bus station	1	Morley	997, 998	Bus interchange
Dianella Plaza	1	Dianella	997	
Stirling station	2	Stirling	996, 997	, Yanchep line
Churchlands Green	1	Churchlands, Herdsman	996	
Shenton Park station	1	Shenton Park	996	Airport line, Fremantle line
QEII Medical Centre	1	Nedlands	996	
University of WA	1	Crawley	996	
Claremont Station	1	Claremont	996	, Airport line, Fremantle line
Fremantle station	2	Fremantle	996	, Fremantle line

== See also ==
- Buses in Perth
