= Carlisle railway station, Perth =

Railway station in Perth, Western Australia

Carlisle
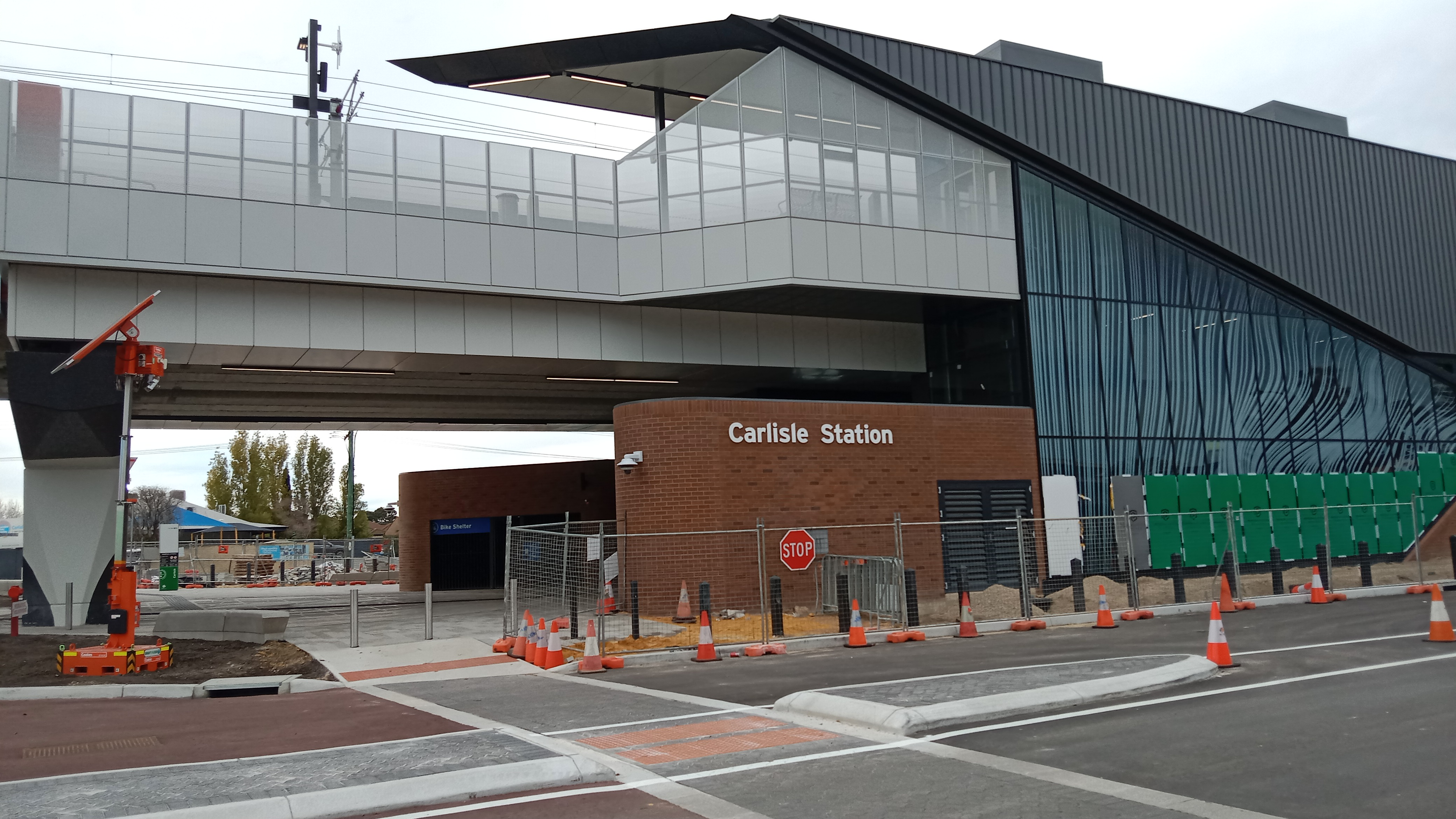
- Carlisle Station viewed from Mint Street

General information
- Location: Bank Street & Rutland Avenue, Carlisle / East Victoria Park; Western Australia; Australia
- Coordinates: 31°58′51″S 115°54′41″E
- Owner: Public Transport Authority
- Operator: Public Transport Authority
- Line: South Western Railway
- Distance: 7.4 kilometres (4.6 mi) from Perth
- Platforms: 2 side platforms
- Tracks: 2
- Bus routes: 2
- Bus stands: 2 (on Archer Street)

Construction
- Parking: Yes
- Accessible: Yes

Other information
- Fare zone: 1

History
- Opened: 2 July 1912
- Rebuilt: 20 November 2023–8June 2025
- Former names: Victoria Park East (Note: Sources differ between Victoria Park East and East Victoria Park); Mint Street; Haydon's Siding

Passengers
- 2013–14: 167,460

Services
Preceding station	Transperth	Following station
Victoria Park towards Perth	Armadale line	Oats Street towards Byford
Victoria Park towards Perth	Thornlie–Cockburn line	Oats Street towards Cockburn Central
Events
Perth Stadium towards Perth	Thornlie–Cockburn line Stadium Special	Oats Street towards Cockburn Central
Location
- Location of Carlisle station

Carlisle railway station is a suburban railway station on the Transperth network in Western Australia. It is in the Perth suburbs of Carlisle and East Victoria Park and is served by Thornlie–Cockburn line and Armadale line services.

The station first opened in July 1912. It was known as Mint Street station at first, but it was renamed Victoria Park East station in October 1912 and to its present name in May 1919. It gained a station master in 1922, which lasted until 1971. Carlisle station had minor upgrades from 2002 to 2003 in preparation for the opening of the Thornlie line, which happened in 2005. In 20 November 2023, the station closed to undergo a complete rebuild as an elevated station as part of the Victoria Park-Canning Level Crossing Removal Project to remove a nearby level crossing. The station reopened in June 2025.

== Description ==
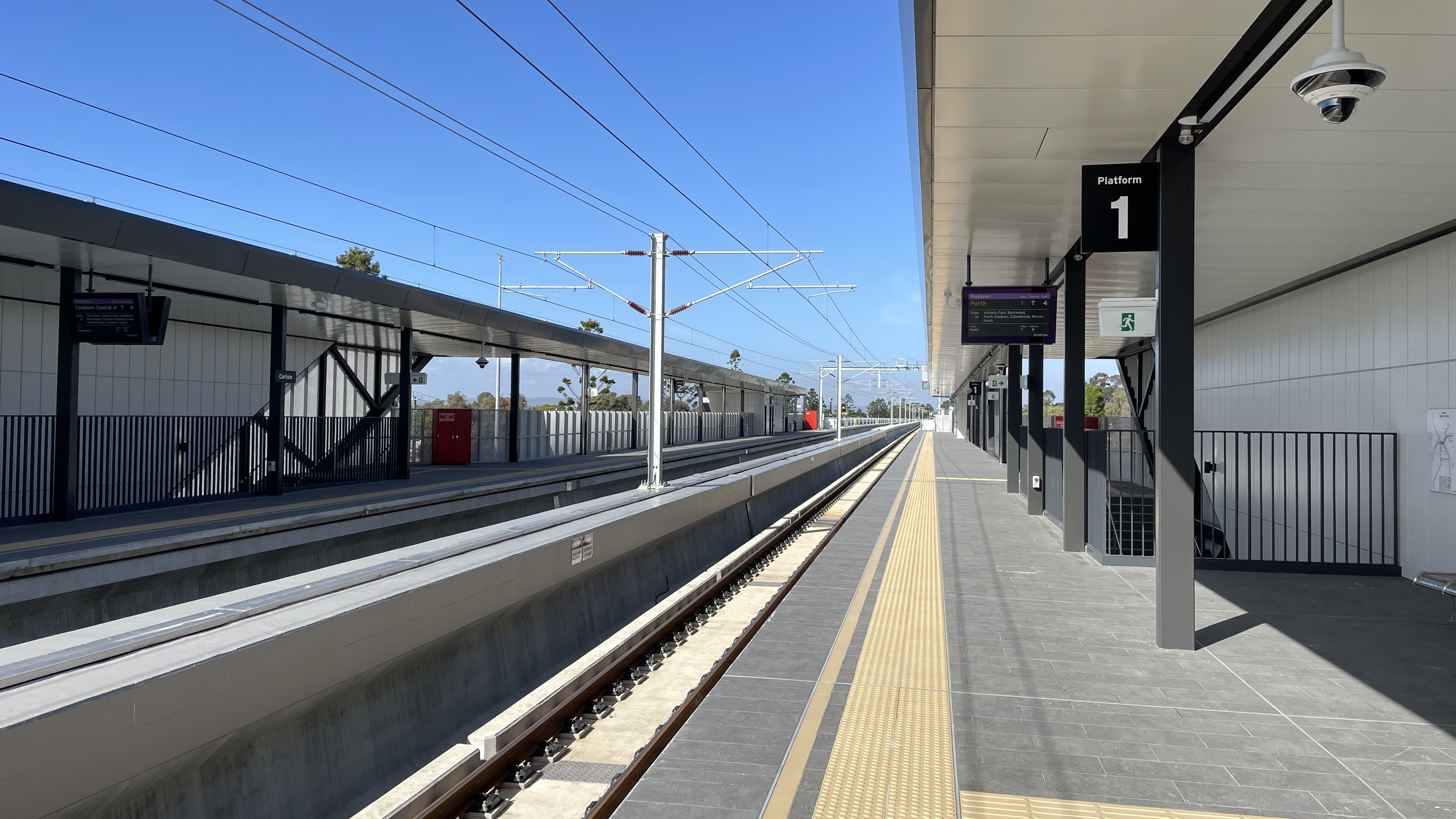
Platforms

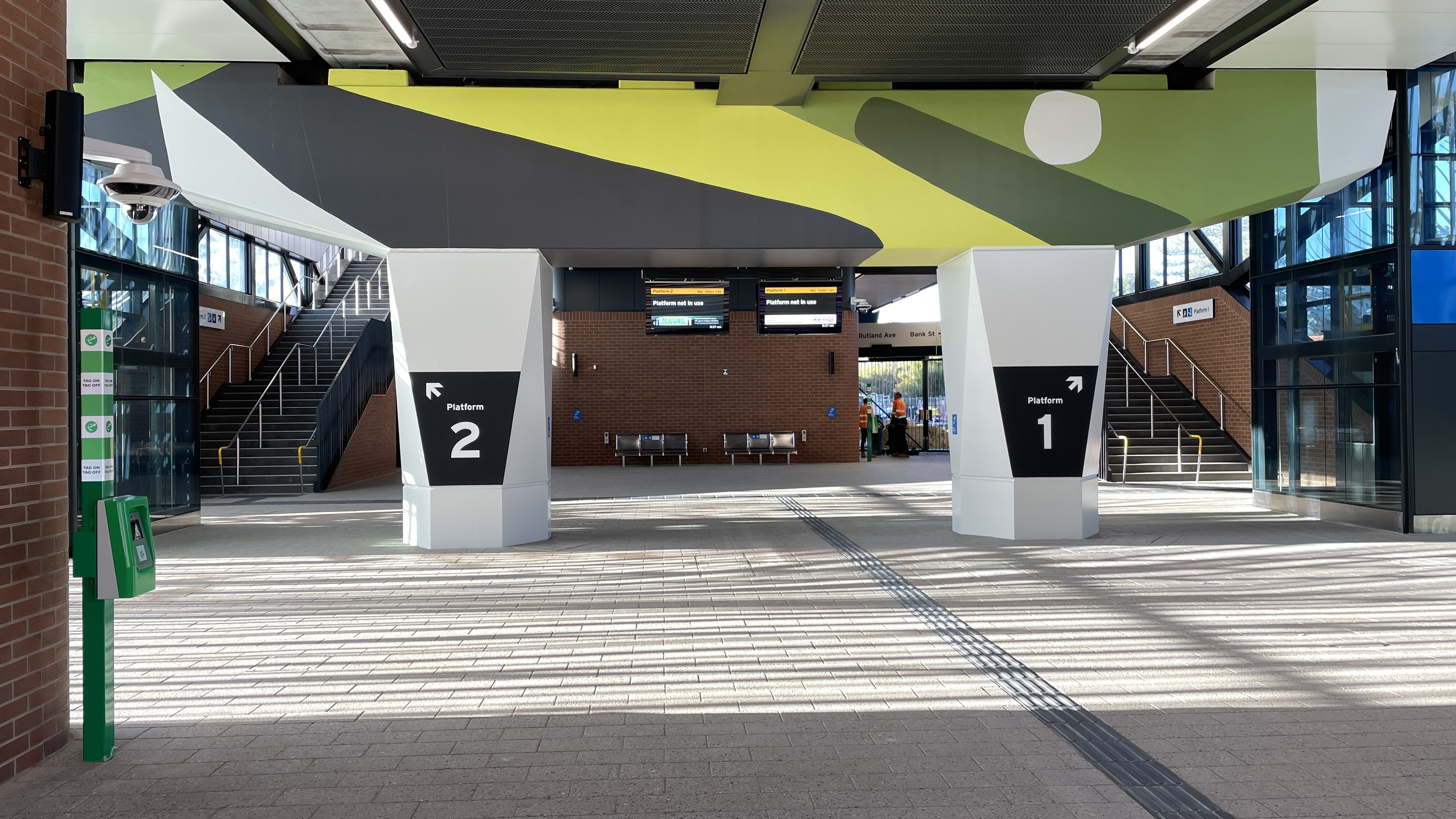
Concourse

Carlisle station is on the boundary of Carlisle and East Victoria Park, which are suburbs of Perth. The station is between Rutland Avenue to the east and Bank Street to the west and is south of the Mint Street/Archer Street level crossing. The station is along the South Western Railway, which links Perth and Bunbury, and is owned by the Public Transport Authority (PTA). Adjacent stations are Victoria Park station to the north-west and Oats Street station to the south-east. Carlisle station is 7.4 kilometres (4.6 mi) from Perth station and is in fare zone one.

Carlisle station consists of two elevated 150 m (490 ft) side platforms. The station is fully accessible with lifts.

The surrounding area predominantly consists of low density residential development, although there is also the Carlisle Hotel and the Harold Hawthorne Community Centre.

== History ==
=== Early history ===
The South Western Railway was opened between Perth and Pinjarra on 2 May 1893. A siding known as Haydon's Siding was soon constructed near the present-day Carlisle station, to serve a foundry.

The Victoria Park Council sent a deputation to the commissioner of railways in July 1910, requesting that trains stop at Mint Street. The commissioner denied the request, saying that he would not consider stopping trains there without a platform or any station facilities. According to a local resident, construction started on a station platform at Mint Street in September 1911 but stopped a few weeks thereafter. In December 1911, the local government sent another deputation to the minister for railways, Philip Collier, asking for several improvements to the railway line, including that trains stop at Mint Street despite any lack of platform or other facilities there. According to the local resident, construction restarted around March 1912, lasting a few more weeks before stopping. The station eventually opened on 2 July 1912. Names suggested for the station included Victoria Park East, Haydon, Bickford, or Mint Street. Victoria Park East was opposed by the commissioner of railways, who believed it would be misleading and cause confusion. At first, the station was named Mint Street, but it was renamed Victoria Park East in October 1912.

The area surrounding the station was initially known as Bickford, but ratepayers voted in April or May 1919 to rename it Carlisle, after the town in England of the same name. On 23 May 1919, the station was renamed Carlisle station following a request from the Perth City Council.

A station master was first appointed to Carlisle station on 1 September 1922. It became an unstaffed station again on 1 June 1971. A total of four station masters worked at the station during this time.

=== 2000s renovation ===
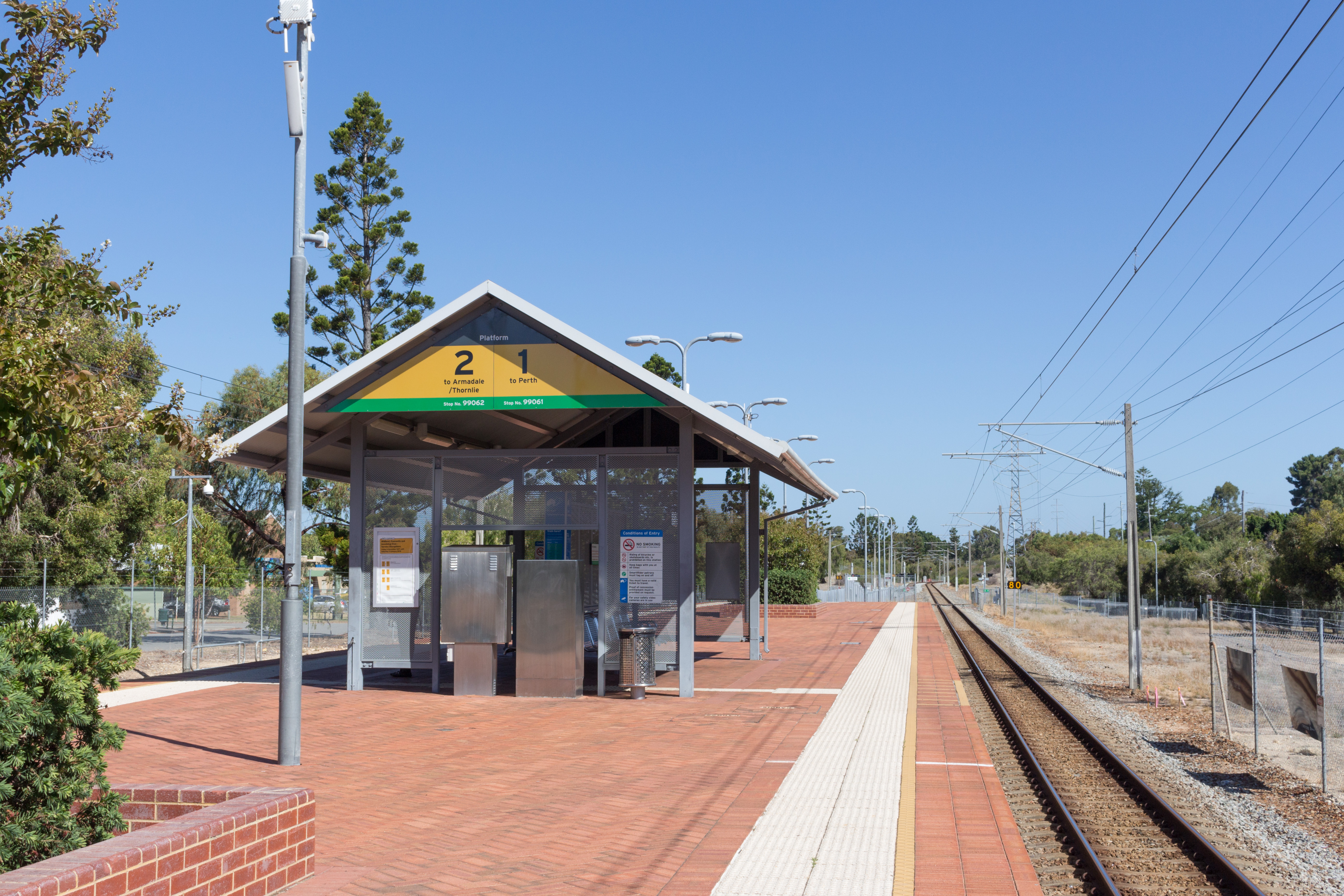
Carlisle station in January 2018

Westrail, the operator of railways in Perth at the time, planned to rebuild Carlisle station in the late 1990s, but that was deferred pending completion of planning for the Mandurah line. The original plans had the Mandurah line branch off the Armadale line at Kenwick, which would have meant an increase in trains at Carlisle station. The first South West Metropolitan Railway Master Plan, published in 1999, therefore proposed a rebuild of Carlisle station. The plan included rebuilding the station closer to the Mint Street/Archer Street level crossing with two side platforms. A pedestrian bridge would have been built, but the level crossing would not have been removed, unlike several other level crossings on the Armadale line. The tracks would have been realigned to allow for a future upgrade to four tracks, and the platforms would have been designed to allow for extension to 150 metres (490 ft).

In 2001, a new state government was elected, who changed the route of the Mandurah line to be a more direct route from Perth rather than a branch of the Armadale line. Instead, the Thornlie line would be built as a one-station spur off the Armadale line at the same place as the previous Mandurah line route. A new master plan was released in August 2002, which scaled back the works proposed for Carlisle station to just an upgrade of the existing station rather than a complete rebuild.

Preliminary work started at Carlisle station in December 2002 and a contract was signed in January 2003. The upgrade cost A$1.2 million and included a resurfaced platform, new shelter, better lighting, and better security. Construction was planned to allow the station to remain open at all times, although with only one entrance open. The upgrade was complete by the end of 2003. The Thornlie line opened on 7 August 2005.

=== 2020s rebuild ===
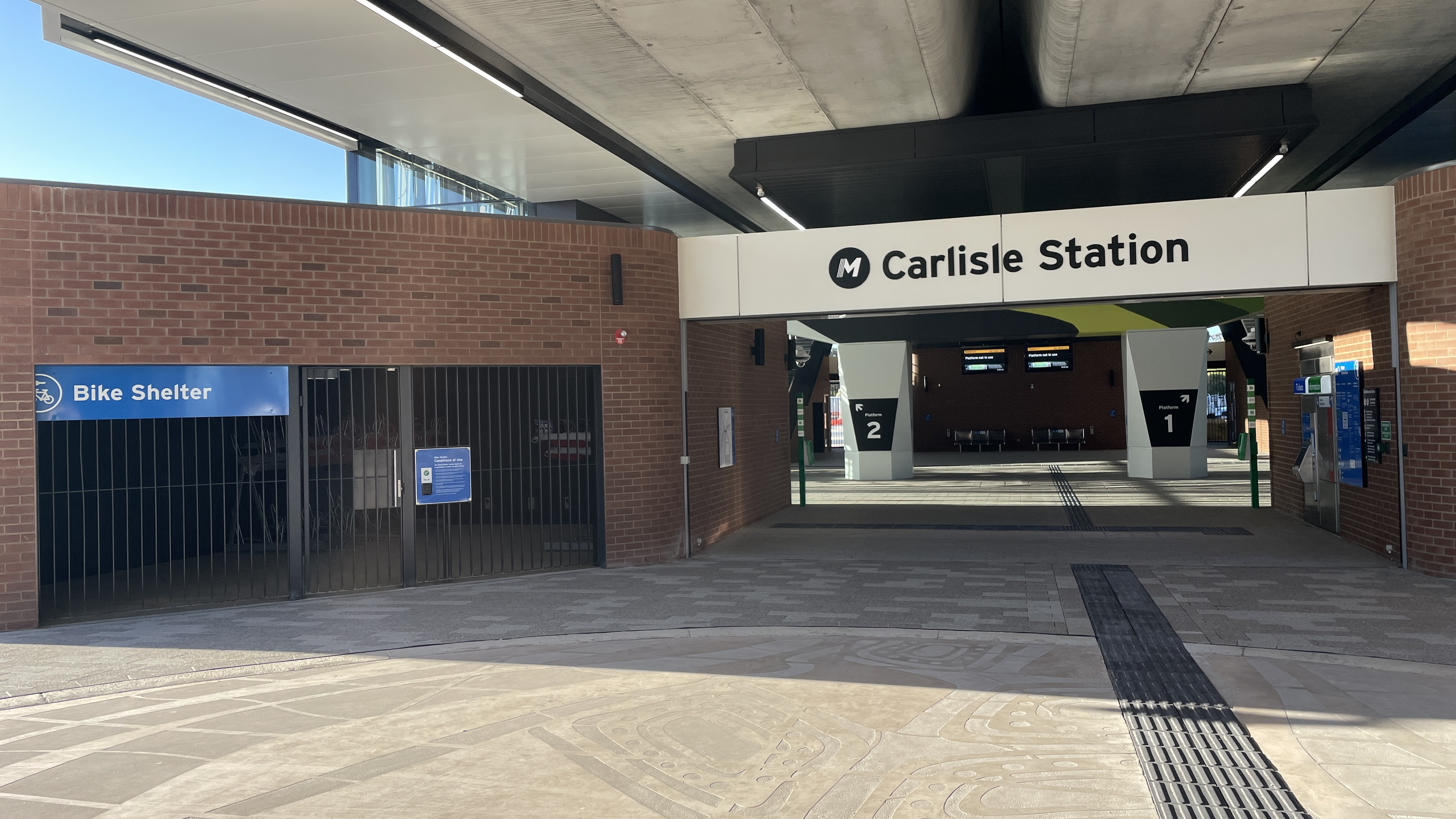
Entrance

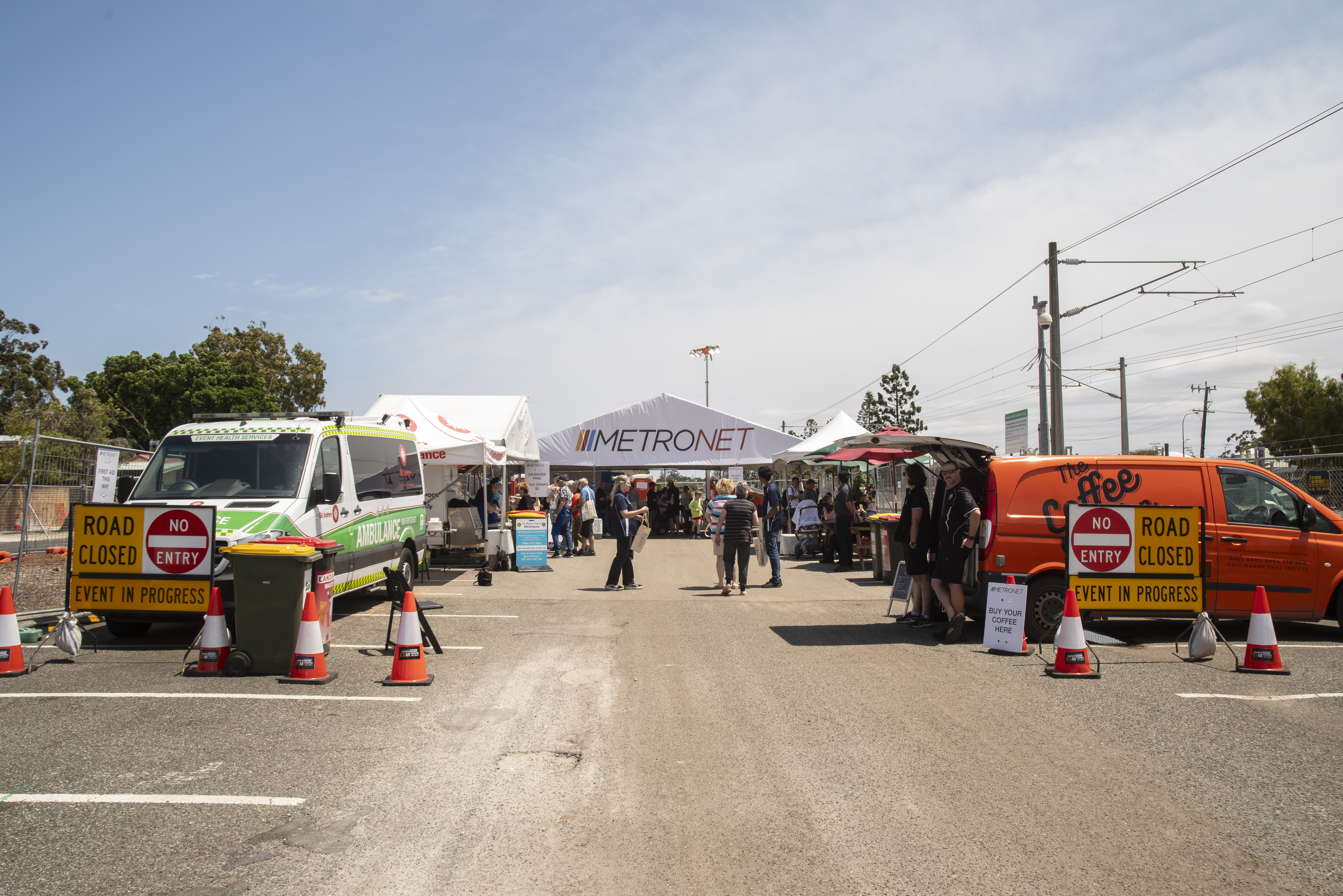
A Metronet information day at Carlisle station in November 2023, a week prior to closing

Under Metronet's Victoria Park-Canning Level Crossing Removal Project, Carlisle station was rebuilt as an elevated station to remove the nearby level crossing. Grade separating the Mint Street/Archer Street level crossing was not initially planned under Metronet, but it was added due to federal funding in 2019. At this stage, the method of level crossing removal had not yet been decided. The decision to go with an elevated solution was announced in June 2020. The railway was to be elevated all the way from Mint Street to past Oats Street, a distance of 1.4 kilometres (0.87 mi). Town of Victoria Park mayor Karen Vernon criticised the decision to go with an elevated railway, instead wanting it to be underground. She said elevated rail "would be a blight on our area" and "it doesn't enhance the character of an area like Victoria Park".

It was announced in February 2022 that to build the elevated railway, the Armadale and Thornlie lines would have to shut down for 18 months. In August 2022, the $701 million contract was signed with the Armadale Line Upgrade Alliance, a consortium of Acciona Construction, BMD Constructions, WSP and AECOM. The 18 month shutdown commenced on 20 November 2023. In February 2024, the first viaduct beams were lifted into place at Carlisle station. The shutdown ended in June 2025.

The new Carlisle station is closer to Mint Street and Archer Street to space out stations better and allow for connections to bus routes along those streets. The station has two 150-metre (490 ft) long side platforms, accessed by lifts and stairs, with provisions for escalators in the future. The car park is located under the elevated railway, and the railway will be positioned on the southern side of the rail corridor, which will allow for expansion to four tracks in the future.

== Services ==
=== Rail ===
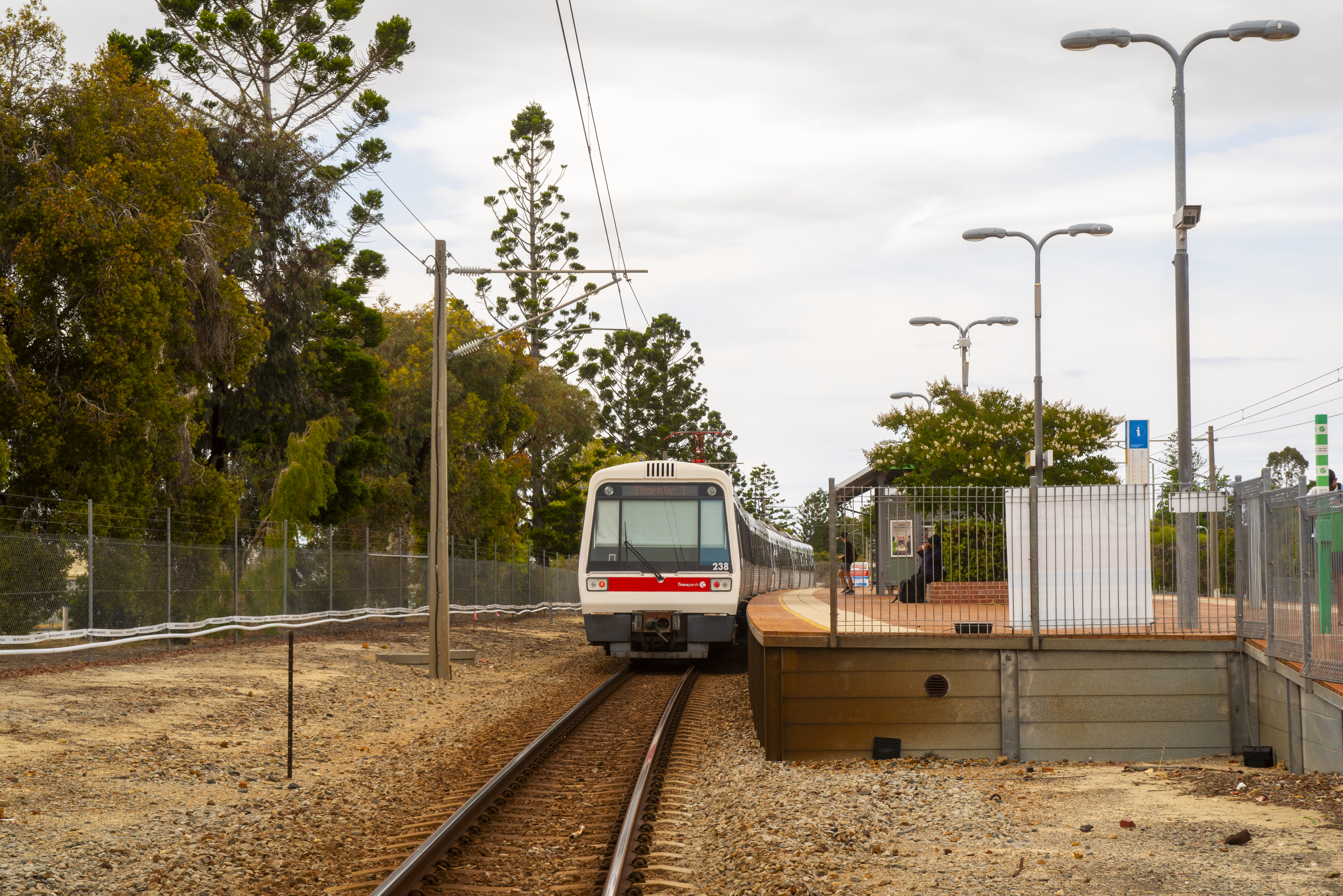
A Thornlie-bound Transperth A-series train at Carlisle station in November 2023

Prior to being closed, Carlisle station was predominantly served by Thornlie line trains but also Armadale line trains at night and on Sundays. These services form part of the Transperth system and are operated by the PTA. The Armadale line operated between Perth station and Armadale station along the South Western Railway. The Thornlie line operated between Perth station and Thornlie station, branching between Beckenham and Kenwick.

Thornlie line trains stopped at the station every 15 minutes during the day from Monday to Saturday and every half an hour at night. On Sundays, Thornlie line trains stopped at the station every half an hour. Armadale line services typically skipped Carlisle station but stopped at the station late at night and on Sundays every half an hour. Service hours were between approximately 5 am and midnight, extending to 2 am on Saturday and Sunday mornings.

After closure, Thornlie-Cockburn line trains and Armadale line trains operate every 7.5 minutes during the day.

In the 2013–14 financial year, Carlisle station had 167,460 boardings, making it a lesser-used station for the Armadale and Thornlie lines. In 2019, the station had an average of 482 boardings per weekday. This is expected to rise to 733 boardings per weekday in 2031.

Carlisle platform arrangement
Stop ID	Platform	Line	Destination	Via	Stopping Pattern	Notes
99061	1	Armadale line	Perth		All stations	
99061	1	Thornlie-Cockburn line	Perth		All stations, TP	
99062	2	Armadale line	Byford		All stations	
99062	2	Thornlie-Cockburn line	Cockburn Central		All stations	

=== Bus ===
The rebuilt station, now closer to Mint and Archer Streets, allowed for the relocation of bus stands to the entrance of Carlisle station.

Carlisle station bus services
Stop	Route	Destination / description	Notes
Stand 1	38	to Perth via Shepperton Road	
Stand 1	284	to Curtin University via Albany Highway	
Stand 1	908	Rail replacement service to Cockburn Central station	
Stand 2	38	to Cloverdale	
Stand 2	284	to Belmont Forum	
Stand 2	908	Rail replacement service to Perth station	
