= Armadale and Thornlie–Cockburn lines =

The Armadale and Thornlie–Cockburn lines are the following suburban railway lines in Perth, Western Australia:

- Armadale line
- Thornlie–Cockburn line, a branch of the Armadale line
