= Edward Millen Home =

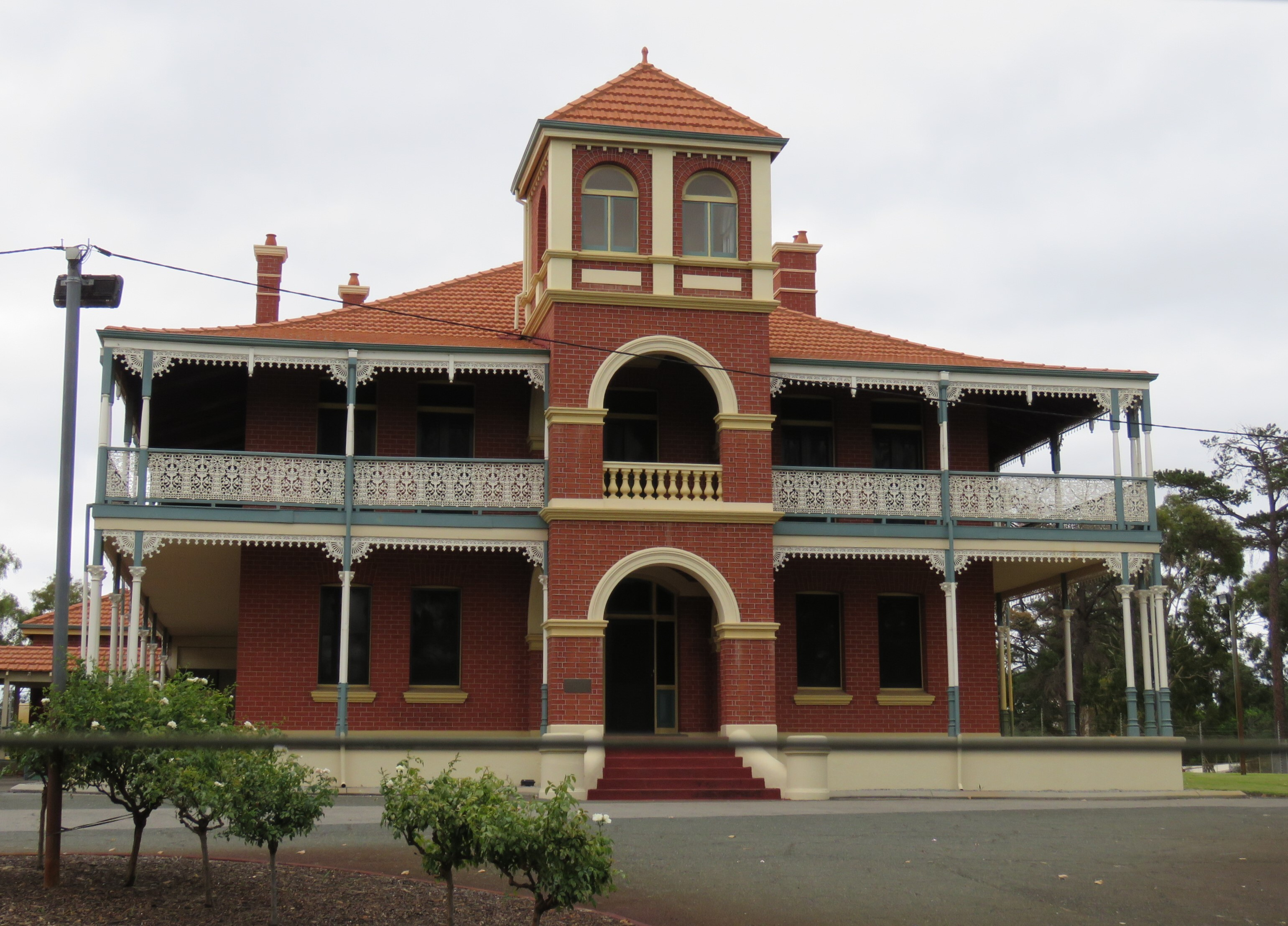
- Edward Millen Home in March 2022

Geography
- Location: East Victoria Park, Western Australia, Australia
- Coordinates: 31°59′35″S 115°54′29″E

History
- Former names: Rotunda Maternity Hospital (1911–1920); Hillview Terrace Hospital (1985–1995)
- Opened: 1912; 114 years ago
- Closed: 2001; 25 years ago

Links
- Lists: Hospitals in Australia
- Building details

General information
- Type: Heritage listed building

Western Australia Heritage Register
- Type: State Registered Place
- Designated: 29 June 1999
- Reference no.: 2176

The Edward Millen Home, originally known as the Rotunda Hospital and later as the Hillview Terrace Hospital, is a heritage-listed former hospital located in East Victoria Park, Western Australia.

The Federation Queen Anne-style main building was opened as a private maternity hospital in 1912 and acquired by the federal Repatriation Department in 1920 for the use of returned soldiers. It was used as a tuberculosis sanatorium and later as a rehabilitation facility. It was transferred to the state government of Western Australia in 1982 and continued to be used for health purposes until 2001. It was subsequently gifted to the Town of Victoria Park in 2006 to be repurposed for community purposes.

== History ==
In 1911, nurse Elizabeth Baillie – one of Western Australia's first registered midwives – purchased land on Albany Highway for £A 650, equivalent to A$99,299 in 2022, for the construction of a private maternity hospital. The Rotunda Hospital opened in 1912 as the only maternity hospital, four years before the King Edward Memorial Hospital for Women opened as Perth's first public maternity hospital.

In June 1919, the Western Australian state government took over the Rotunda Hospital for use as a quarantine facility during the Spanish flu pandemic. The facility was run by the Perth Public Hospital until its closure in September 1959. The site was compulsorily acquired by the Commonwealth government in May 1920, to be used by the Repatriation Department as a tuberculosis sanatorium and hospital for returned soldiers. It was renamed the Edward Millen Home in honour of the federal repatriation minister Edward Millen. Elizabeth Baillie was paid compensation of £5,000, equivalent to A$393,042 in 2022, and the adjoining street was named Baillie Avenue in her honour.

The Repatriation Commission transferred control of the site to the Perth Public Hospital in 1942, after which it was used for tubercular purposes by both returned soldiers and civilians. The Repatriation Commission resumed control in 1949 and in 1960 moved the remaining tubercular patients to the General Repatriation Hospital. It was then converted to a 40-bed geriatric rehabilitation hospital. The Restoration Centre, a new brick and tile building, was added in 1968 for adult psychiatric patients, and remained in use by the Repatriation Commission until 1982 when ownership of the site was transferred to the Western Australian state government's Department of Health. In the same year the hospital was listed on the Register of the National Estate.

The Hillview Child and Adolescent Clinic was established at the site in 1985, as a psychiatric service for child patients. It included two residential units and an outpatient clinic, known as the Hillview Hospital, in the main building. The clinic was closed permanently in 1995, with services moved to Bentley Hospital. The closure followed an independent legal review commissioned after a senior nurse was convicted of child sexual abuse. The review found evidence of "rorts by nursing staff; poor record keeping; a dominant and inappropriate nursing culture; inappropriate out of hours contact between patients and staff; and inappropriate physical contact between patients and staff", with one psychiatrist being deregistered as a result of the review. The Mildred Creak Centre for Autistic Children was also located on the site and remained opened until 2001.

The Edward Millen precinct was unoccupied and unused for decades following the closure of on-site facilities. It was listed on the State Register of Heritage Places in 1999. In 2006, the state government gifted the precinct to the Town of Victoria Park local government for "community, recreational or civic use".

== Buildings ==
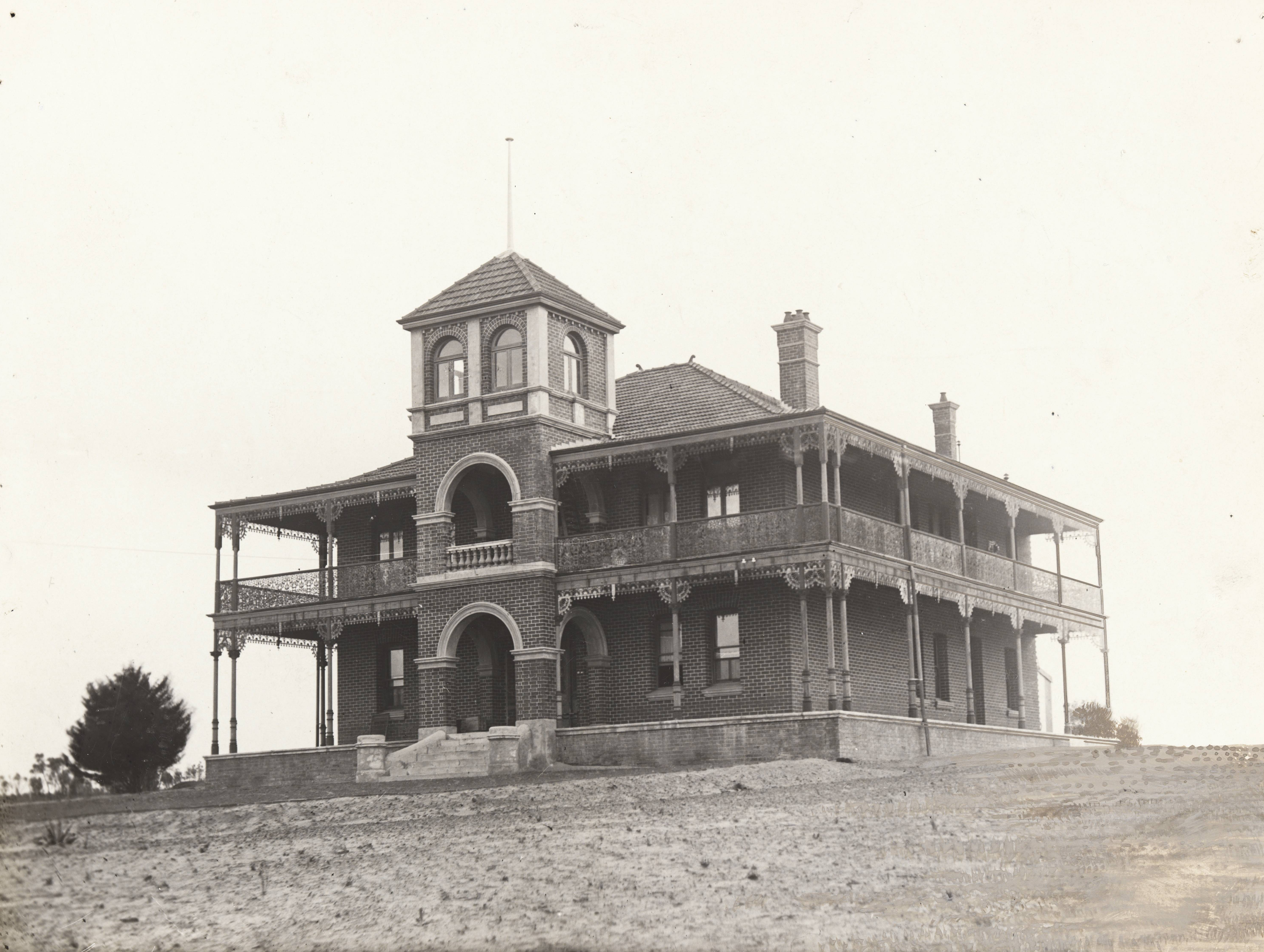
The Rotunda Hospital main building in 1919

The landmark main building – the original Rotunda Hospital – is described on the State Register of Heritage Places as a "fine example of Federation Queen Anne architecture, displaying internal and external detailing". The main approach to the forecourt passes through Edward Millen Park and is lined with mature trees, leading to Albany Highway. The main building is built from red brick, with a verandah and balcony surrounding three sides featuring a decorative iron balustrade. The three-storey tower above the main entrance features several arches. The interior "features a jarrah staircase, pressed metal ceilings, mosaic tiles on the front porch and stained and leaded glass panels in the front door".

== Redevelopment plans ==
In 2023, the Town of Victoria Park granted a 20-year lease over the site to private equity firm Blackoak Capital Ventures, who will spend an estimated $12.5 million to restore and redevelop the buildings and surrounding reserve. The main Rotunda building will be used as a "bakery, cafe, retail space and office space", while other buildings will include "a bar, bistro, microbrewery, museum or gallery and function rooms" and "ice-cream parlour, art studio, community markets, a petting zoo and childcare facilities". The project received $4 million in federal government heritage funding and a sod-turning ceremony was held in November 2024.
