= Oats Street railway station =

Railway station in Perth, Western Australia

Oats Street
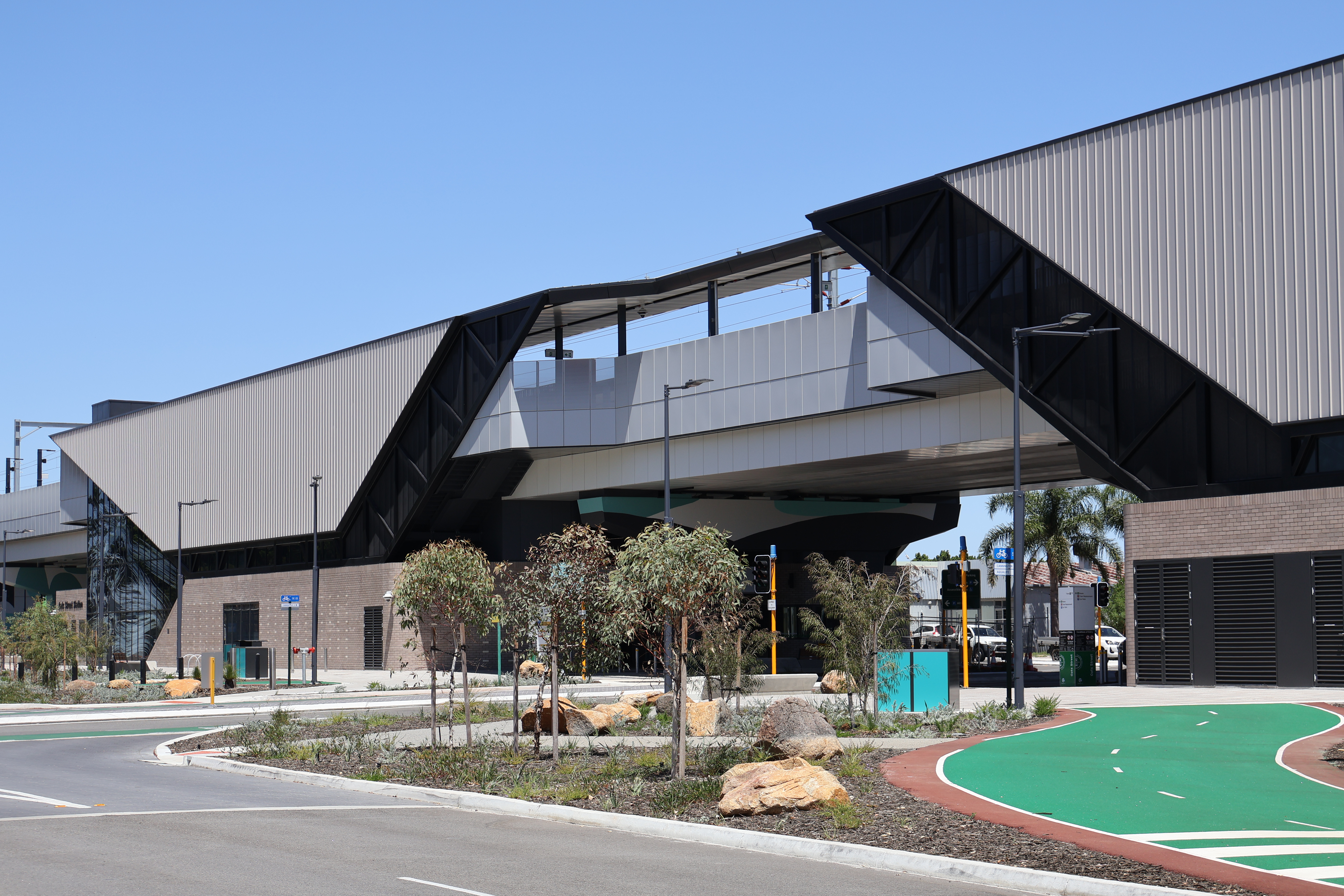
- Exterior of Oats Street station

General information
- Location: Oats Street & Rutland Avenue & Bank Street, Carlisle / East Victoria Park; Western Australia; Australia
- Coordinates: 31°59′13″S 115°54′57″E
- Owner: Public Transport Authority
- Operator: Public Transport Authority
- Line: South Western Railway
- Distance: 8.2 kilometres (5.1 mi) from Perth
- Platforms: 2 side platforms
- Tracks: 2
- Bus stands: 8
- Connections: Bus

Construction
- Parking: Yes
- Cycle facilities: Yes
- Accessible: Yes

Other information
- Fare zone: 1

History
- Opened: 28 November 1954
- Rebuilt: 20 November 2023–8 June 2025

Passengers
- 2019: 1,766 per weekday

Services
| Preceding station | Transperth | Following station |
|---|---|---|
| Carlisle towards Perth | Armadale line | Queens Park towards Byford |
| Carlisle towards Perth | Thornlie–Cockburn line | Queens Park towards Cockburn Central |
Location
- Location of Oats Street station

Oats Street railway station is a Transperth suburban railway station in Western Australia, located in the Perth suburbs of Carlisle and East Victoria Park. The station is served by the Armadale and Thornlie–Cockburn lines.

Oats Street station opened on 28 November 1954, because the introduction of diesel railcars made it possible to build stations closer together. The station consisted of two side platforms north of the Oats Street level crossing. The CircleRoute bus began operating in 1998, allowing access to Curtin University from the Armadale line. A bus interchange was constructed soon thereafter, and Oats Street soon became one of the most important stations on the Armadale line.

The Thornlie line opened in 2005, with Oats Street station being one of the few transfer stations between the two lines, further increasing its importance. As part of the Victoria Park-Canning Level Crossing Removal Project, Oats Street station was closed and rebuilt as an elevated station between 20 November 2023 and 8 June 2025.

The Armadale and Thornlie lines each have a 15-minute frequency, reducing to every 30 minutes at night. Bus routes from Oats Street station go to Airport Central station, Kalamunda bus station, Curtin University, Belmont, and Kewdale.

== Description ==
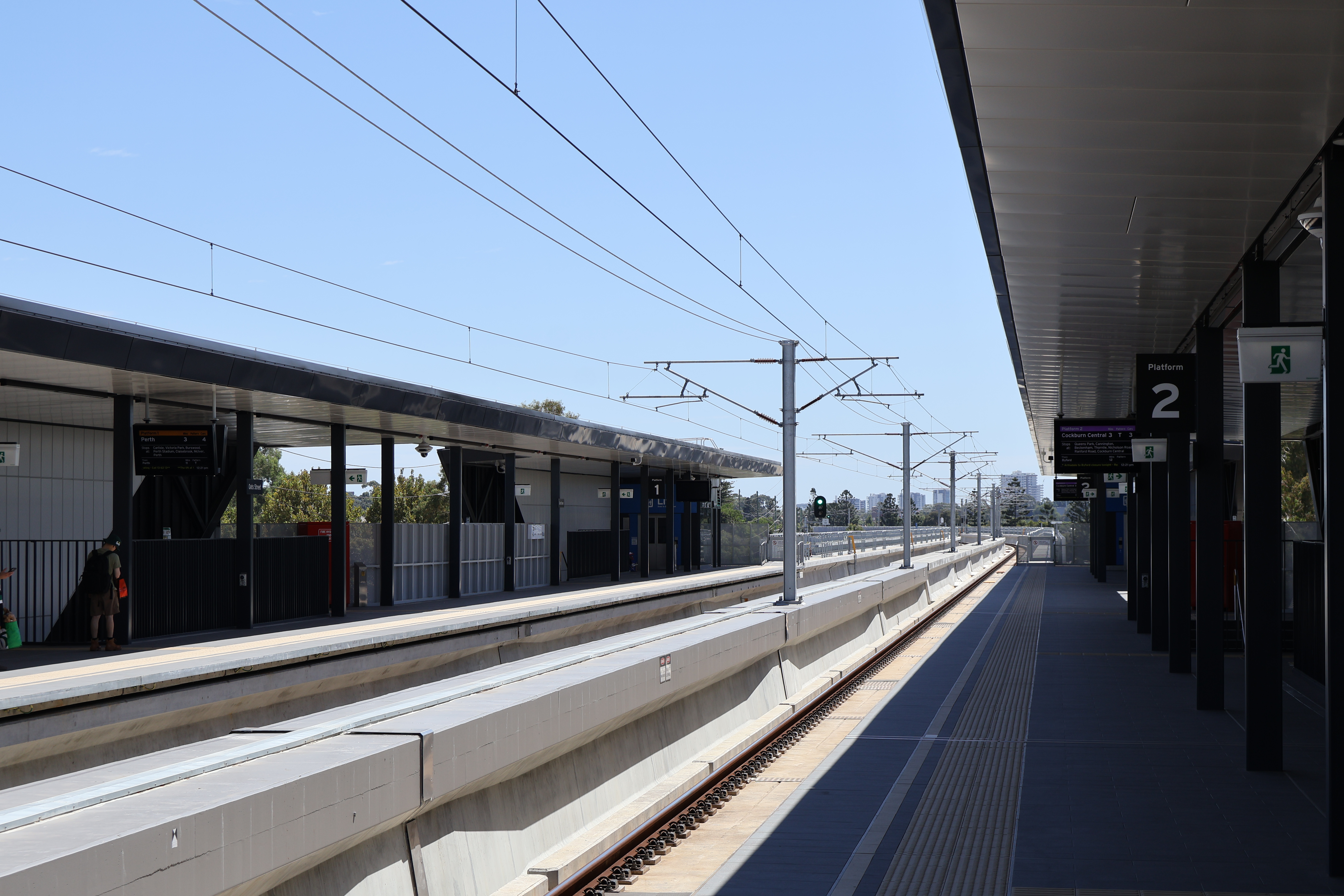
Oats Street station platforms

Oats Street station is on the boundary of Carlisle and East Victoria Park, which are suburbs of Perth, Western Australia. The station intersects Oats Street between Rutland Avenue to the east and Bank Street to the west. The station is along the South Western Railway, which links Perth and Bunbury, and is owned by the Public Transport Authority (PTA). Adjacent stations are Carlisle station to the north-west and Queens Park to the south-east. Oats Street station is 8.1 kilometres (5.0 mi) from Perth station and is in fare zone one.

Oats Street station consists of two 150-metre (490 ft) elevated side platforms. The station is accessible with lifts. Other amenities include bike shelters.

The surrounding area predominantly consists of low-density residential development, with some light industrial properties to the south. There is also the Carlisle campus of the South Metropolitan TAFE, directly to the west of Oats Street station.

== History ==
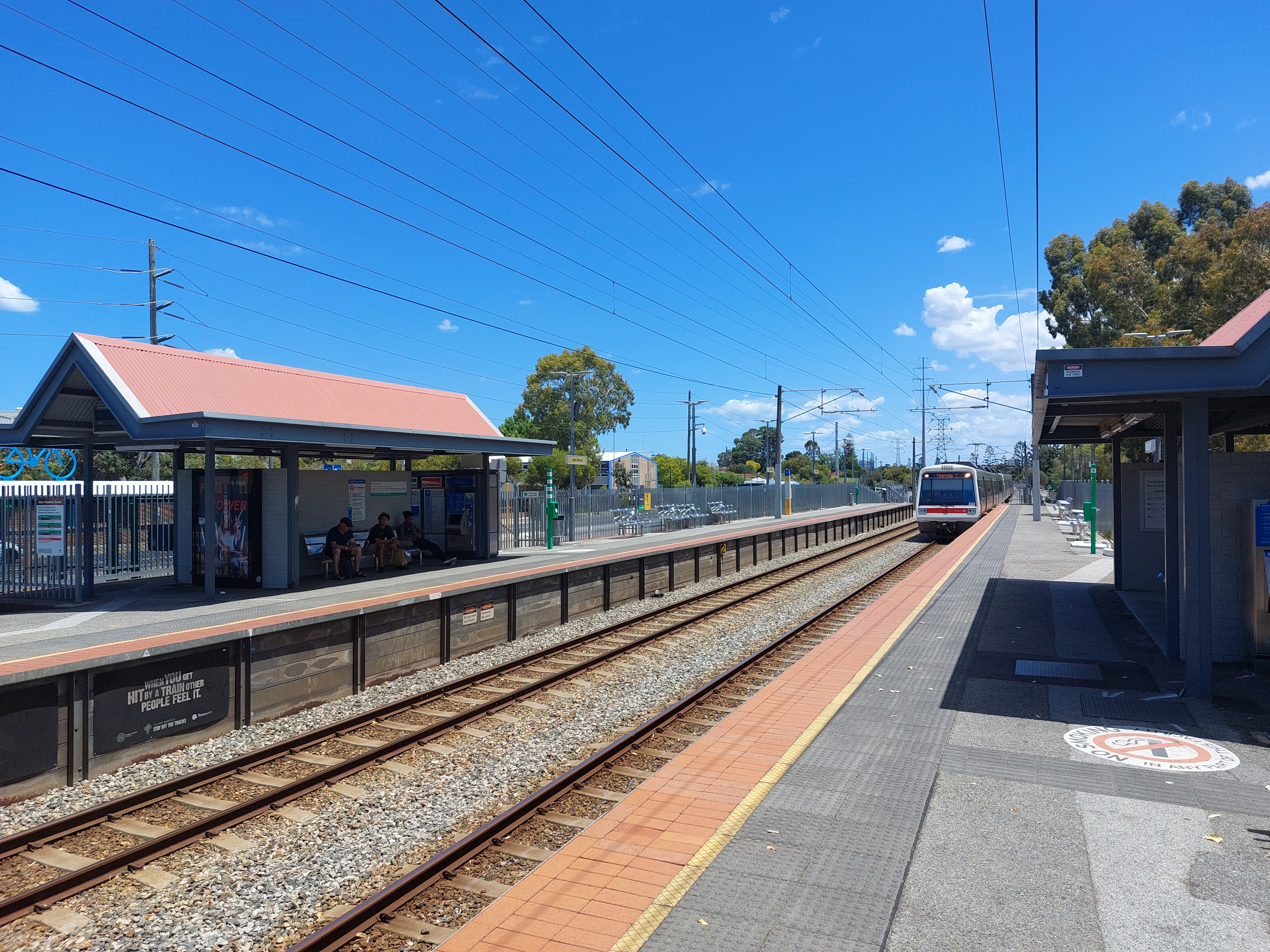
A Transperth A-series train arriving at Oats Street station, 2022

Diesel railcars were introduced to Perth's rail network in 1954. The diesel railcars had faster acceleration than steam trains, which allowed for more stations to open. Oats Street station opened on 28 November 1954 as an infill station between Carlisle and Welshpool stations, along with six other stations on the same day: Ashfield, Higham (now known as Beckenham station), Grant Street, Stokely, Loch Street, and Victoria Street.

On 16 February 1998, the first stage of the CircleRoute bus route launched. This stage went from Fremantle station to Oats Street station via Curtin University. The second stage opened on 22 February 1999, forming a full loop around Perth. The Oats Street bus interchange was built between 1998 and 2002 to make transferring between bus and train easier. This yielded a 22 percent increase in patronage at Oats Street station for 2002 compared to 1998. Oats Street station has since become an important station for people travelling to Curtin University and the Carlisle TAFE campus.

The original plans for the Mandurah line had it branch off the Armadale line at Kenwick, which would have meant an increase in trains at Oats Street station. The South West Metropolitan Railway Master Plan, published in 1999, said that Oats Street station would become a transfer point between the Mandurah and Armadale lines, with Mandurah line trains running express along most of the Armadale line. It therefore said that Oats Street station would need to be grade separated and rebuilt. It would either become elevated over Oats Street or in a trench; further planning was not done due to the site's constraints.

In 2001, a new state government was elected, who changed the route of the Mandurah line to be a more direct route from Perth rather than a branch of the Armadale line. Instead, the Thornlie line would be built as a one-station spur off the Armadale line at the same place as the previous Mandurah line route. A new master plan was released in August 2002, which cancelled all proposed works at Oats Street station. The Thornlie line opened on 7 August 2005 and the Armadale line became a predominantly express service, stopping at only Oats Street between Claisebrook and Cannington stations, making Oats Street an interchange between the two lines.

Between April and August 2020, the bus interchange at Oats Street station was expanded northwards, which increased the number of bus stands from two to four and added three layover bays. The upgrade allowed for articulated buses to use the station and enabled more bus services, including specifically a new route between Oats Street and Airport Central stations when the Airport line opened on 9 October 2022.

=== Level Crossing Removal Project ===
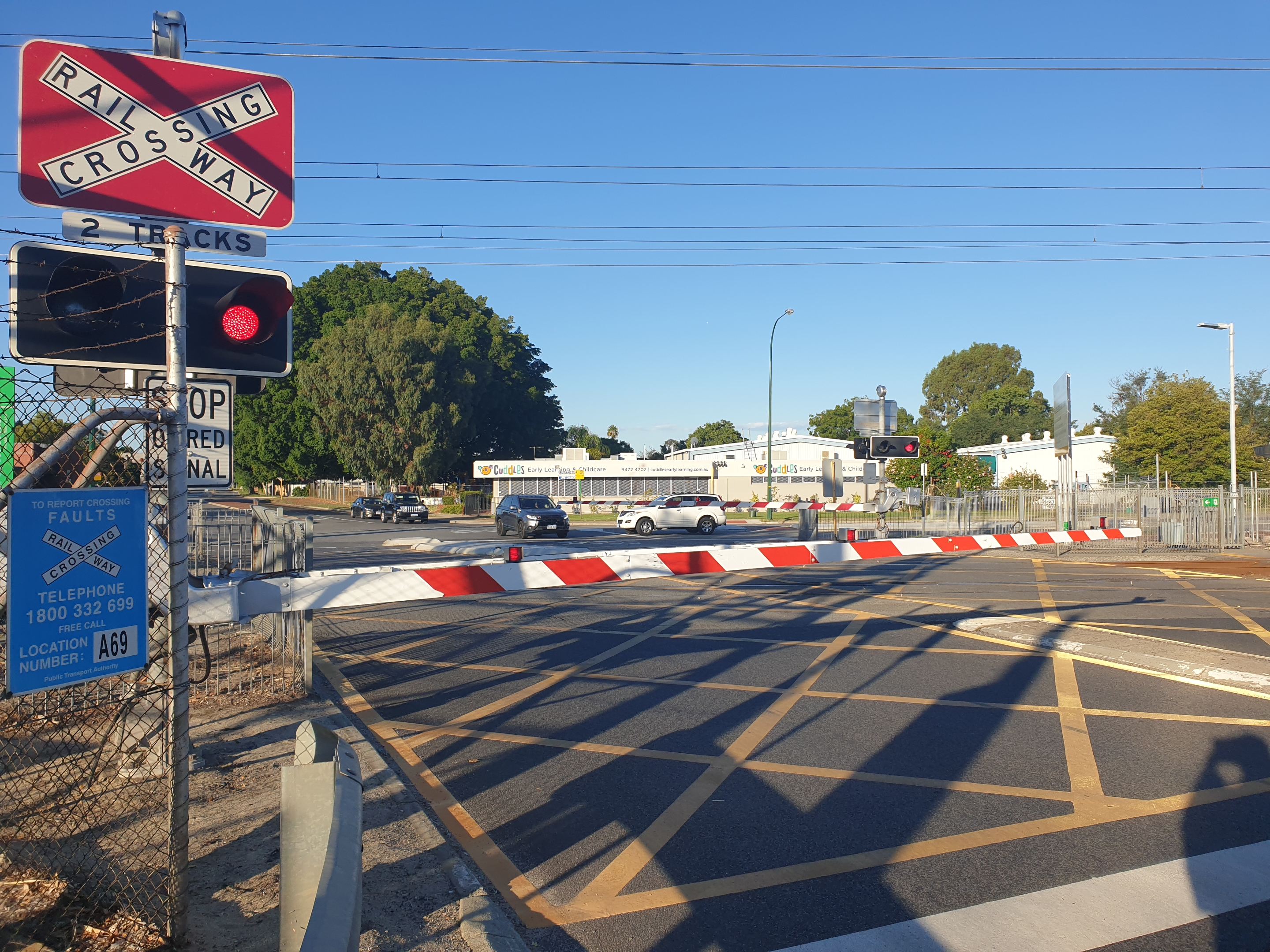
Oats Street level crossing with the boom gates down, 2021

Before the 2017 state election, the Labor Party promised to remove the Oats Street level crossing if they were elected. Following the Labor Party's successful election, Metronet was formed to manage upgrades to Perth's rail network. More level crossings were added to the project in 2019, forming the Victoria Park-Canning Level Crossing Removal Project, which removed six level crossings on the Armadale line. The decision to go with an elevated solution was announced in June 2020. The railway was elevated all the way from Mint Street near Carlisle station to south of Oats Street, a distance of 1.4 kilometres (0.87 mi). Town of Victoria Park mayor Karen Vernon criticised the decision to go with an elevated railway, instead wanting it to be underground. She said elevated rail "would be a blight on our area" and "it doesn't enhance the character of an area like Victoria Park".

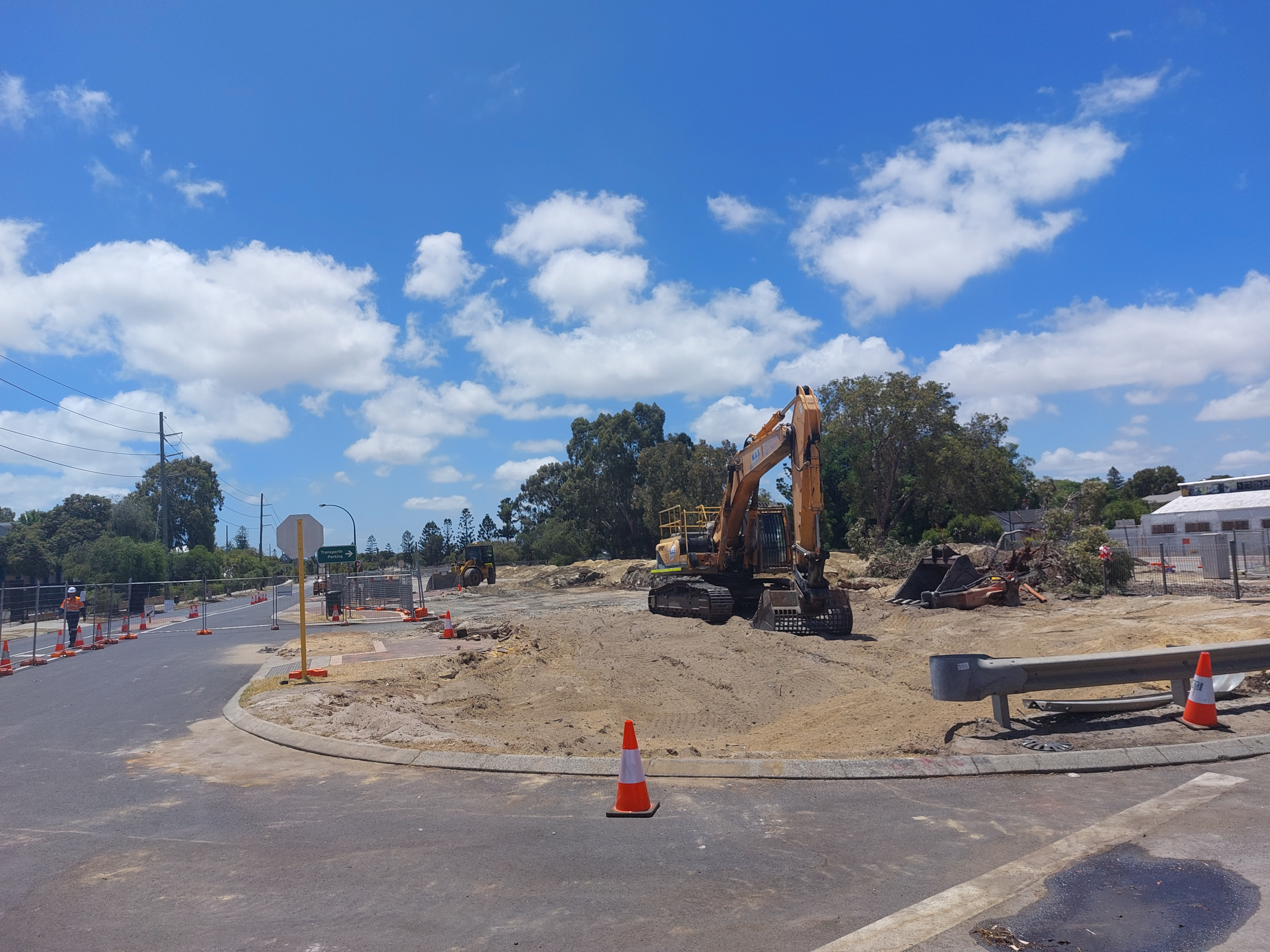
Oats Street station post demolition, December 2023

It was announced in February 2022 that to build the elevated railway, the Armadale and Thornlie lines would have to shut down for 18 months. In August 2022, the A$701 million contract was signed with the Armadale Line Upgrade Alliance, a consortium of Acciona Construction, BMD Constructions, WSP and AECOM. The 18 month shutdown commenced on 20 November 2023. Services recommenced between Perth, Beckenham and Thornlie on 8 June 2025.

The new Oats Street station straddles Oats Street, with entrance buildings on both sides of the road. The station has 150-metre (490 ft) long side platforms. Each entrance building has one lift and one set of stairs to each platform, with provisions for escalators in the future. The station is staffed, unlike before the rebuild. There are two bicycle storage rooms with capacity for 78 bicycles in total, and a car park with approximately 100 bays. The new bus interchange is on the southern side of the station, and it has eight bus stands and four layover bays. The station is positioned on the southern side of the rail corridor, which will allow for expansion to four tracks in the future.

== Services ==
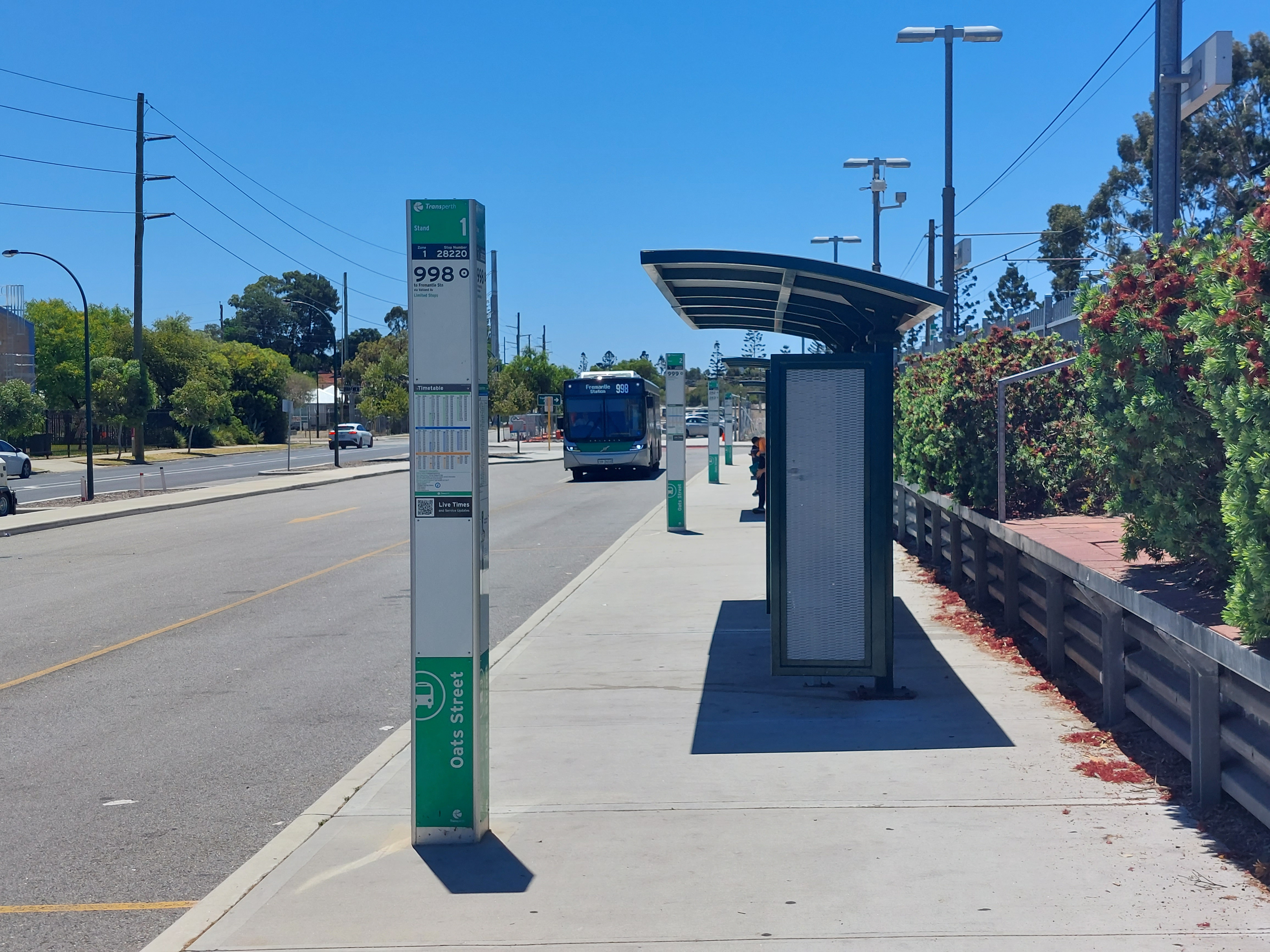
The upgraded Oats Street station bus interchange, November 2023

Armadale and Thornlie line trains stopped at Oats Street station, making it a transfer point between the two lines. These services formed part of the Transperth system and were operated by the PTA. The Armadale line operated between Perth station and Armadale station along the South Western Railway. The Thornlie line operated between Perth station and Thornlie station, branching off at Kenwick.

Thornlie line trains stopped at all stations between Cannington and Claisebrook stations, whereas Armadale line trains generally skipped all stations between Cannington and Claisebrook stations. The Armadale line had 15 minute headways all week, with three extra trains during peak hour. Frequency at night was every half an hour. The Thornlie line had 15 minute headways from Monday to Saturday, dropping to every half an hour on Sundays and at night. Service hours were between approximately 5 am and midnight, extending to 2 am on Saturday and Sunday mornings.

=== Bus routes ===
Seven regular bus routes serve Oats Street station. Route 37 runs to Airport Central station via Belmont. Route 176 runs to Elizabeth Quay bus station. Routes 282 and 283 run to Kalamunda bus station. Route 285 runs to Kewdale. Routes 999 and 998, also known as the CircleRoute, travel in a loop around Perth, and link Oats Street station to Curtin University bus station and Belmont.

In the 2013–14 financial year, Oats Street station had 704,498 boardings, making it the third most used station on the Armadale and Thornlie lines, below Cannington and Perth stations. In 2019, the station had an average of 1,766 boardings per weekday. This is expected to rise to 3,916 boardings per weekday in 2031.
