= Queens Park railway station, Perth =

Railway station in Perth, Western Australia

Queens Park
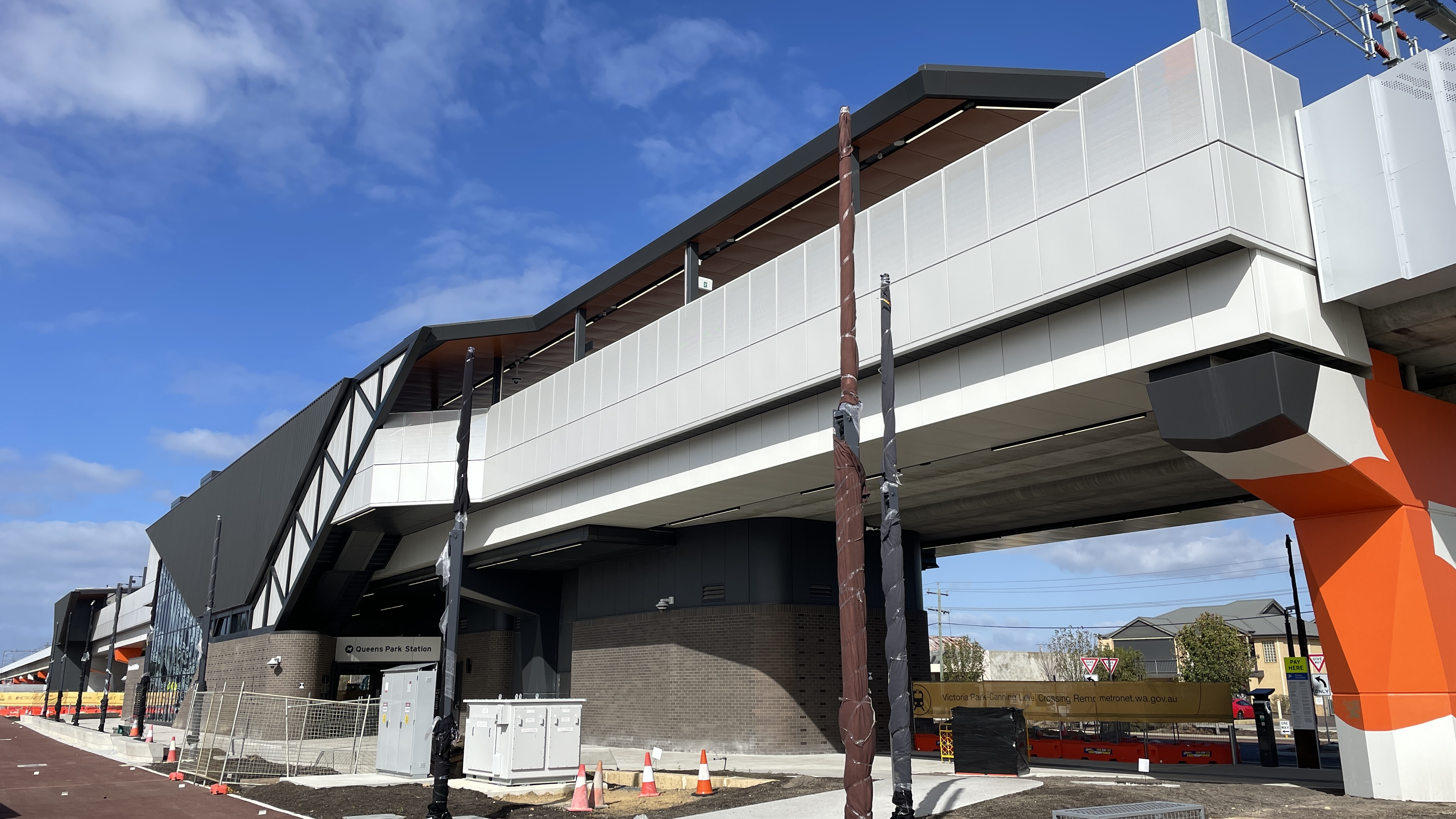
- Station exterior in July 2025

General information
- Location: Sevenoaks Street, Queens Park Western Australia; Australia
- Coordinates: 32°00′27″S 115°56′19″E
- Owner: Public Transport Authority
- Operator: Transperth Train Operations
- Lines: Armadale line; Thornlie–Cockburn line
- Distance: 11.4 kilometres (7.1 mi) from Perth
- Platforms: 2 (1 island)
- Tracks: 2

Construction
- Structure type: Ground

Other information
- Station code: AQP; 99091 (platform 1); 99092 (platform 2)
- Fare zone: 2

History
- Opened: 1899
- Closed: 1990, 20 November 2023
- Rebuilt: 1997, mid-2025
- Former names: Woodlupine

Passengers
- 2013–14: 238,960

Services
Preceding station	Transperth	Following station
Oats Street towards Perth	Armadale line	Cannington towards Byford
Oats Street towards Perth	Thornlie–Cockburn line	Cannington towards Cockburn Central
Former services
Preceding station	Transperth	Following station
Welshpool towards Perth	Armadale line	Cannington towards Armadale
Welshpool towards Perth	Thornlie Line	Cannington towards Thornlie
Location
- Location of Queens Park railway station

Queens Park Station is a suburban railway station on the Transperth network. It is located on the Armadale and Thornlie-Cockburn lines, 11.4 kilometres from Perth Station serving the suburb of Queens Park, Western Australia.

== History ==
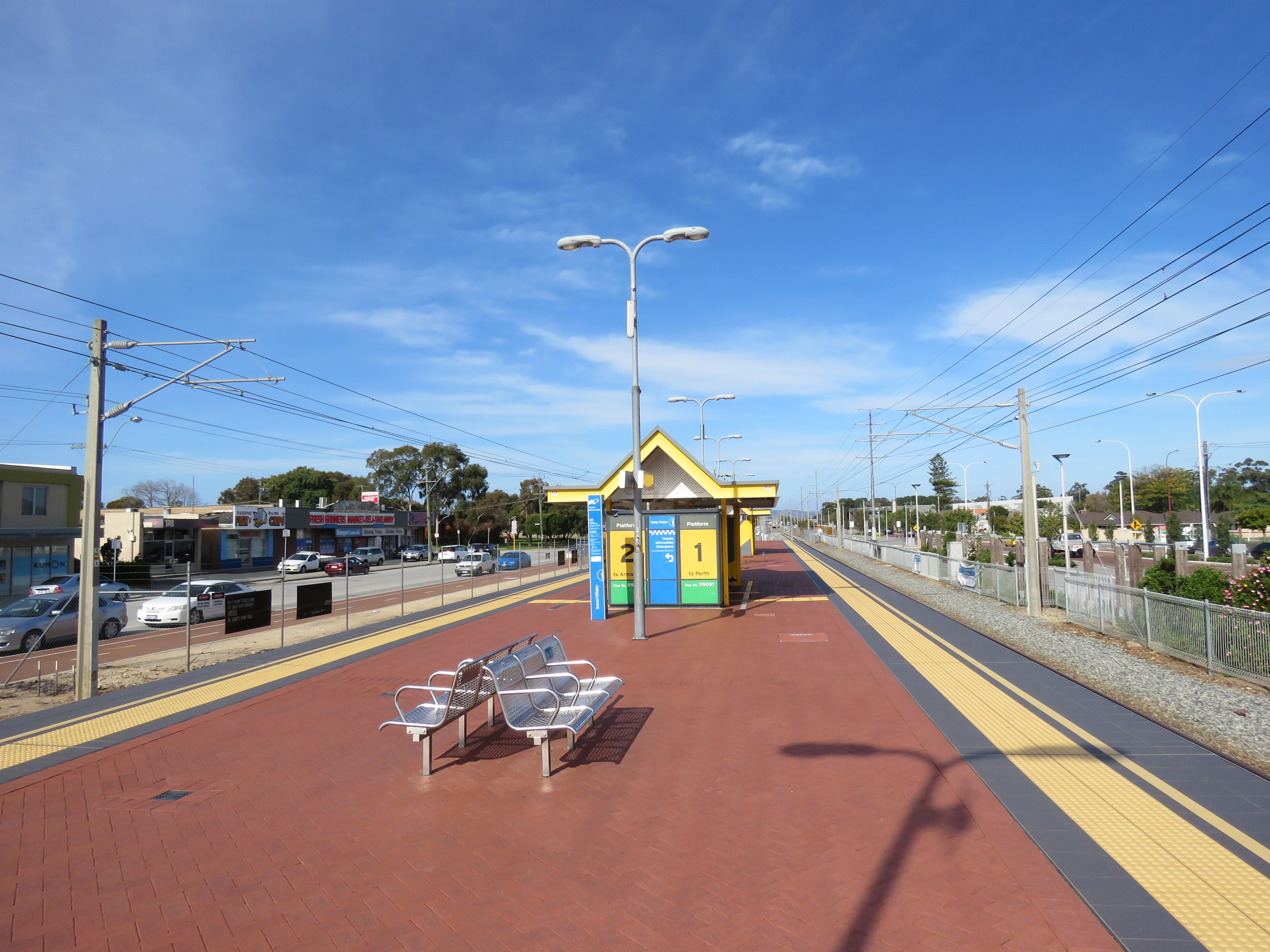
Platforms in June 2021, prior to rebuild

Queens Park Station opened in 1899 as Woodlupine, being renamed Queens Park on 16 April 1912.

In 2012, the station was refurbished.

Rebuild

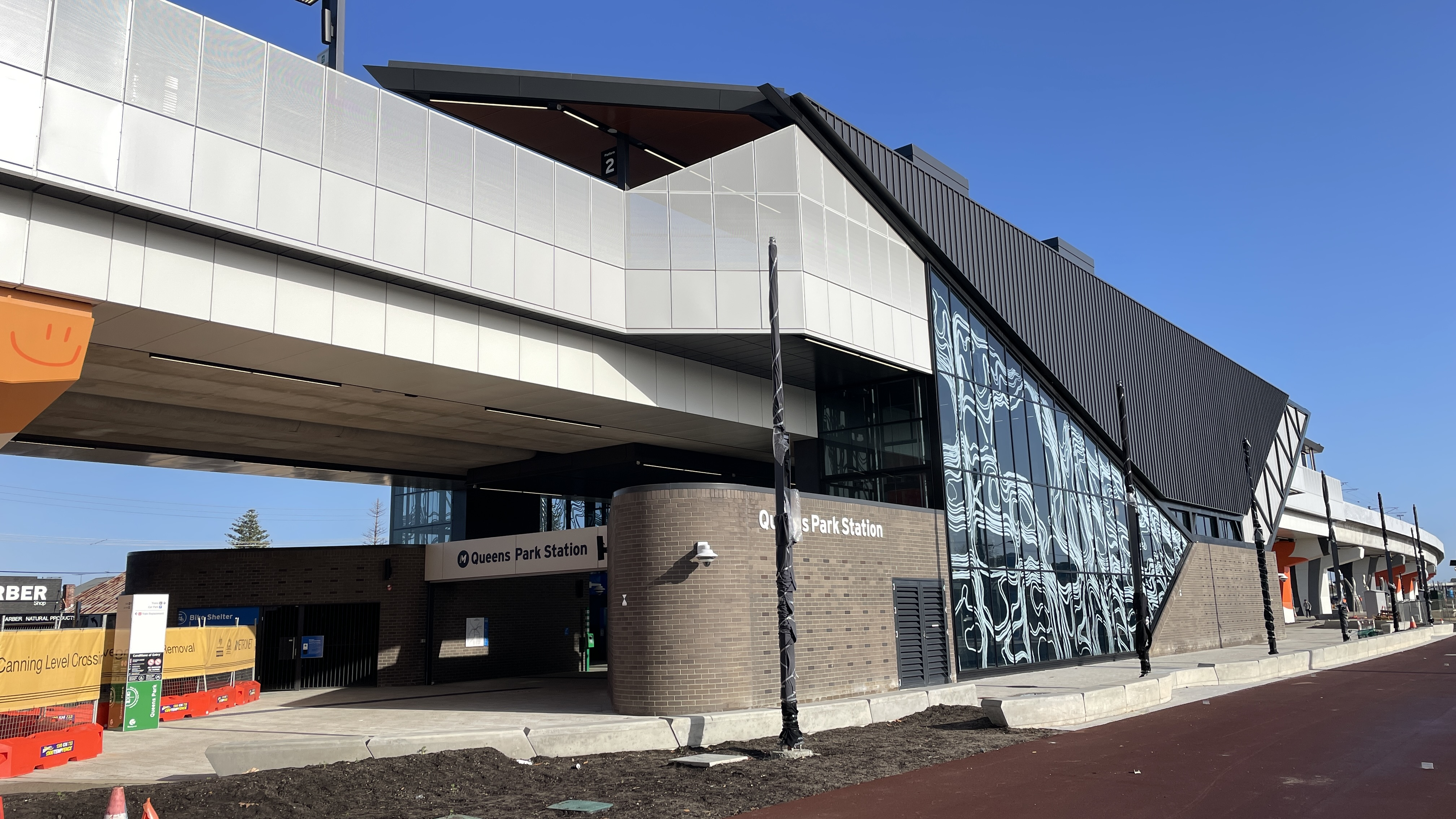
Station building

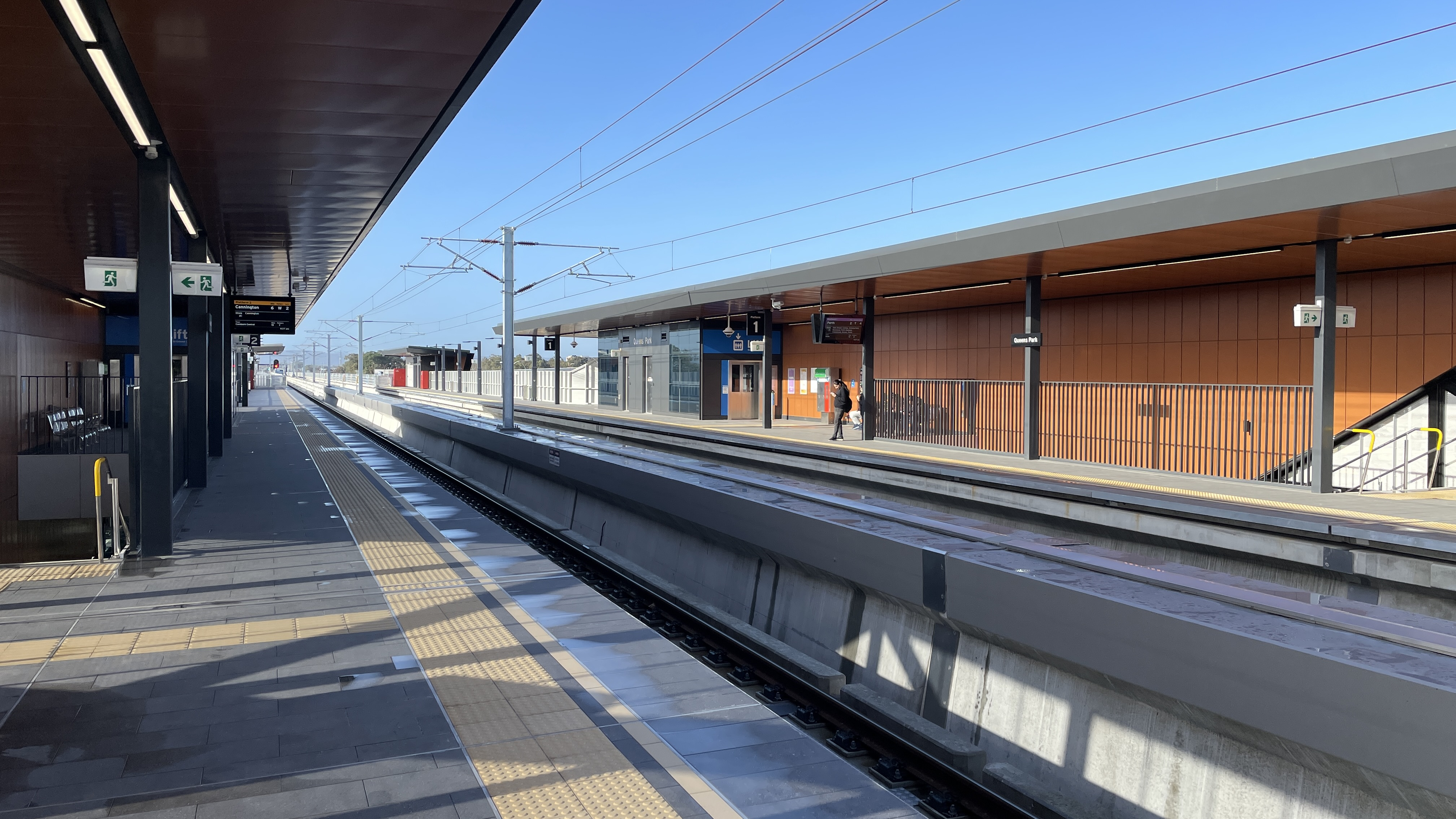
Platforms

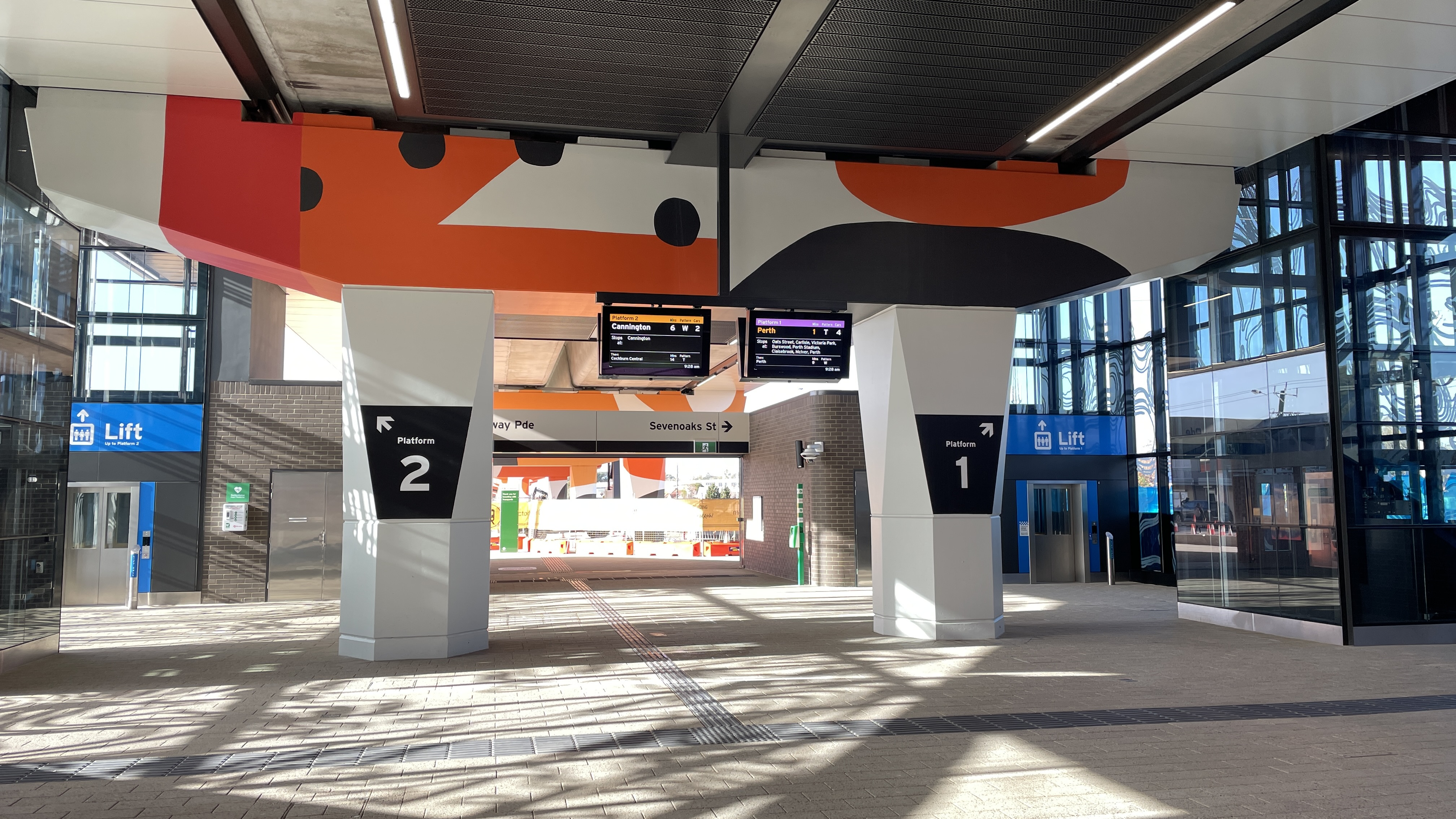
Concourse

As part of a Metronet project for several level crossing removals on the Armadale line, Queens Park Station was rebuilt as an elevated station and the Hamilton Street and Wharf Street level crossings were replaced with elevated rail. The design saw Queens Park Station moved about 100 metres (300 ft) closer to Hamilton Street, with a new passenger car park underneath the elevated railway. The new station features stairs and lifts, with future proofing to allow escalators and fare gates to be added in the future. The new station platforms are side platforms as opposed to the previous island platform design in order to reduce the impact of the bridge structure on the surrounding area. The platforms are also to length of a six-car train (150m), as opposed to the previous station which only had a length of a four-car train (100m).

== Services ==
Queens Park Station is served by Transperth Armadale and Thornlie–Cockburn line services. Thornlie-Cockburn line services operate between Perth and Cockburn Central, every 15 minutes during the day and every 30 minutes at night. Armadale line services operate between Perth and Cannington, running every 7.5 minutes during the day and every 15 minutes at night. This results in an overall frequency of 12 trains per hour during the day and 6 per hour at night. Each line usually operates with A Series trains in 4 or 2 car sets or a 3 car B Series train, however on event days the station is served by special event services on the Thornlie-Cockburn line which run as 6 car B or C Series sets and skip McIver, Claisebrook, Burswood and Victoria Park stations. Passengers travelling to those stations can instead use the Armadale line.

The station saw 238,960 passengers in the 2013-14 financial year.

Prior to the 2023 closure, the station was also served by the twice daily B pattern which was intended as a school special for the nearby St Joseph's School and St Norbert College. It was skipped by Armadale line C Pattern services.

== Platforms ==
Queens Park platform arrangement
Stop ID	Platform	Line	Destination	Via	Stopping Pattern	Notes
99091	1	Armadale line	Perth		All stations	
99091	1	Thornlie-Cockburn line	Perth		All stations, TP	
99092	2	Armadale line	Byford		All stations	
99092	2	Thornlie-Cockburn line	Cockburn Central		All stations	
