= Kalamunda bus station =

Bus station in Perth, Western Australia

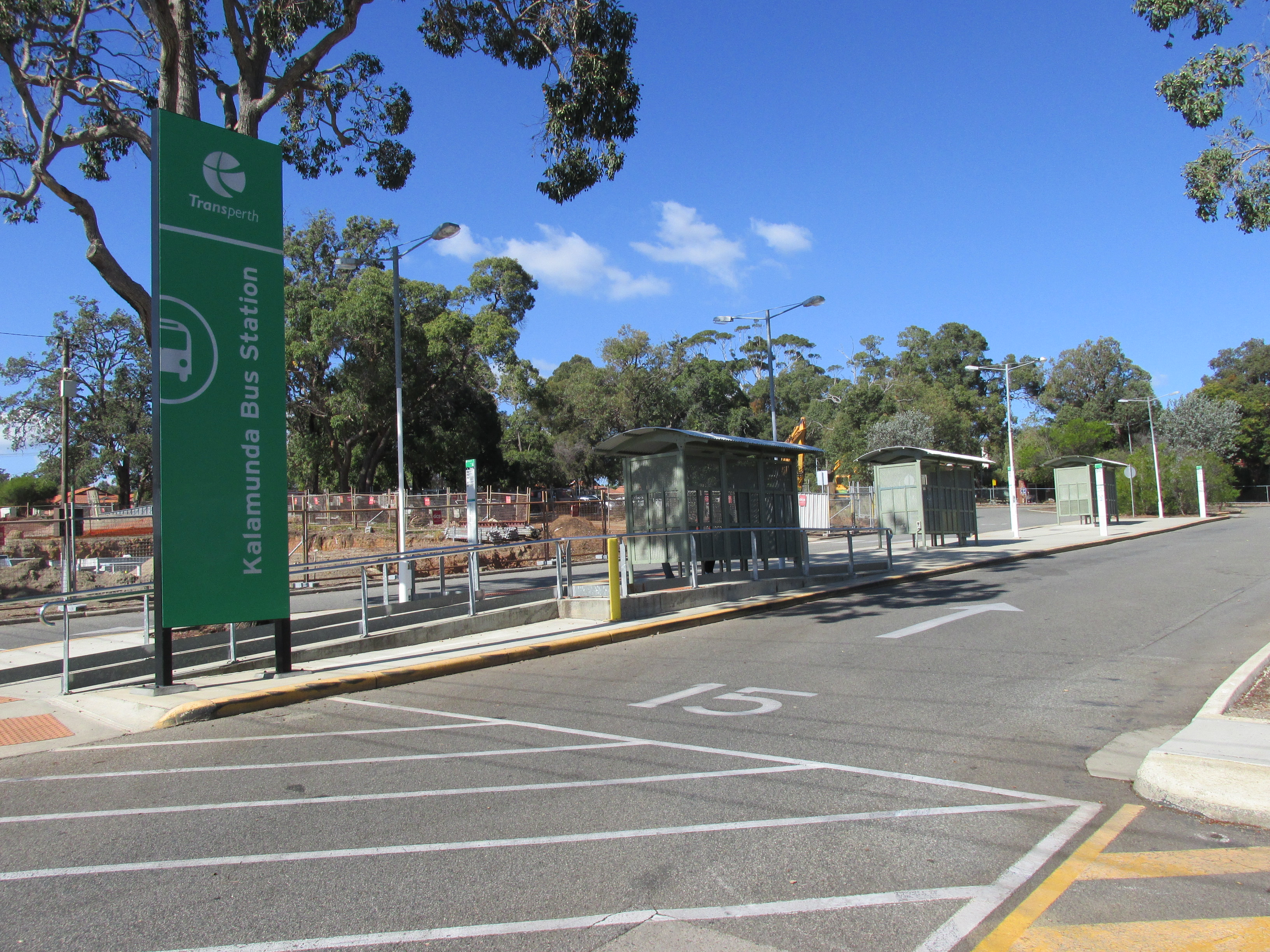
- Bus station before its redevelopment

General information
- Location: Mead Street, Kalamunda; Western Australia; Australia
- Coordinates: 31°58′25″S 116°03′28″E
- Owner: Public Transport Authority
- Operator: Transperth
- Bus routes: 8
- Bus stands: 4

Other information
- Fare zone: 3
Location

Kalamunda bus station is a Transperth bus station located next to the Kalamunda Central shopping centre in Kalamunda, Western Australia. It has four stands and is served by eight Transperth routes operated by Path Transit and Swan Transit.

Kalamunda bus station opened in September 1982.

In 2009, the bus station was redeveloped with more modern bus shelters, new stands, full accessibility, improved lighting and better signage.

== Bus routes ==
Stop	Route	Destination / description	Notes
Stand 1	279	Maddington Central via Kelvin Road & Lesmurdie Road	
Stand 1	282	Oats Street Station via Grove Road	extending as route 176 to Elizabeth Quay Bus Station
Stand 1	283	Oats Street Station via Lesmurdie Road	extending as route 176 to Elizabeth Quay Bus Station
Stand 2	273	Kalamunda via Cotherstone Road	Circular service
Stand 2	275	Walliston	
Stand 3	274	Gooseberry Hill via Peoples Avenue	
Stand 3	276	High Wycombe station via Gooseberry Hill	
Stand 3	307	Midland station via Helena Valley	
Stand 3	655	Perth Stadium bus station via High Wycombe station	Special event service
Stand 3		School Specials	
Stand 4	275	High Wycombe station via Kalamunda Road	
