= Clackline Nature Reserve =

Nature reserve in Western Australia

- IUCN category Ia (strict nature reserve)
- Location within Western Australia
- Location: Western Australia
- Nearest city: Clackline
- Coordinates: 31.71°S 116.51°E
- Area: 703 ha (1,740 acres)
- Established: 1973
- Governing body: Department of Biodiversity, Conservation and Attractions

Clackline Nature Reserve is the largest nature reserve in the Shire of Northam. It is located approximately one kilometre (0.62 mi) north of Clackline, in Western Australia's Wheatbelt region. The reserve is extends east to Clackline–Toodyay Road, south to one kilometre (0.62 mi) before Great Eastern Highway, and west to an unnamed road that runs north-west from Refractory Road. In March 2005, the reserve was 693.7 hectares (1,714 acres) in size, with an additional 45 hectares (110 acres) added in 2008/09. It is listed on the non-statutory Register of the National Estate.

== Description ==
External image
- View of Clackline Nature Reserve from Refractory Road, 1995 (Australian heritage photographic library)

Clackline Nature Reserve has two distinct landforms. To the west is a gently undulating terrain and in the east the land is dissected into steep sided valleys and ridges. Vegetation is chiefly woodland with variation in trees with soil type. They include jarrah, marri wandoo, powderbark wandoo, brown mallet, rock sheoak, Christmas tree and bull banksia. A rare species of orchid not known in any other reserve occurs, Caladenia × triangularis .

=== Vegetation ===
There are a range of soil types across Clackline Nature Reserve, with clays, sandy clays and loamy soils in the lower sections of the topography, while pallid zone clays are exposed on erosional slopes, and gravely soils occur at the top of breakaways. There is a similar diversity of vegetation, with wandoo at the low points, powderbark on the slopes, and jarrah or marri woodland on the breakaway tops. There are five general patterns of vegetation based around these species:

#Wandoo (Eucalyptus wandoo) WOODLAND, 15-18 m in height, with some marri (E. calophylla) and jarrah (E. marginata) and patches of sheoak (Allocasuarina huegeliana). The understorey is generally open and dominated by blackboys (Xanthorrhoea preissii), parrot bush (Dryandra sessilis) and pingle (D. carduacea). Patches of pingle THICKET, 2-3m. in height, occur occasionally.

1. Powderbark (Eucalyptus accedens) FOREST/WOODLAND, 15-18 m in height, with a variable component of wandoo, marri and jarrah. The percentage cover of the undetstorey is highly variable, ranging from very sparse to dense. Dominant species include blackboys, parrot bush, Hakea trifurcata and bullock poison (Gastrolobium trilobum).
2. Jarrah/marri WOODLAND/OPEN WOODLAND, 1.5-20 m in height, over a highly diverse understorey. Much of this diversity is a direct response to changes in soil type, from laterite-gravel loams to sand. A pingle and Hakea trifurcata dominated SCRUB/THICKET occurs on the gravelly surfaces, while the understorey on the sandplain areas varies from Eremaea pauciflora and mountain kunzea (Kunzea recurva) TPICKET/DENSE THICKET, 2-3 m in height, to Leptospermum erubescens and Hakea trifurcata dominated THICKET/SCRUB to 2.5 m.
3. Marri WOODLAND, 15-17 m in height, over jam (Acacia acuminata) and sheoak LOW WOODLAND A over LOW GRASS.
4. Sheoak LOW WOODLAND A/LOW FOREST A, 6-8 m in height, with an open understorey. Jam appears occasionally

The reserve contains the rare plant species Acacia aphylla (leafless rock wattle) and the priority two flora species Papistylus grandiflorus (also known as Stenanthemum grandiflorum).

=== Fauna ===
Clackline Nature Reserve is home to a variety of different species. Typical mammals in the reserve are the western grey kangaroo (Macropus fuliginosus), western brush wallaby (M. irma), euro (M. robustus), echidna (Tachyglossus aculeatus) and rabbit. A variety of reptiles are present, including at least five frogs, four geckos, three legless lizards, one dragon, two goarina, five skink, and five snake species; and there are more than fifty species of bird, notably the wedge-tailed eagle and dusky woodswallows.

== History ==
=== Background ===
Though part of a north-south ridge system, the Clackline area has been easily accessed for many years due to the gap through which Clackline Brook, Great Eastern Highway, and the former Eastern Railway passed. While the southern area was released for agriculture and settlement, the area to the north was too rugged, postponing its release. In 1928, an application was made to purchase land in the area. However, as the block was "carrying good stands of Wandoo" according to the Conservator of Forests, on 6 January 1929 a timber reserve was created, with an area of 544 acres (220 ha). Over the next 44 years, however, the area decreased to 130 hectares (320 acres).

=== Establishment ===
A nearby resident, botanist Ray Paynter, coordinated an effort to protect the Clackline area for conservation purposes in the 1960s and 70s. The Department of Mines opposed the idea, even though the operators of Clackline Refractory, which mined in the area, were supportive. Paynter and the Clackline community continued to push for the creation of a reserve. On 3 March 1973, she wrote to Northam MLA Ken McIver, citing the species of birds, orchids, and kangaroos that would benefit. Nine months later, on 21 December 1973, a reserve "was set aside for the Conservation of Flora and Fauna".

=== Expansion ===
Recommendations from the Department of Environment and Conservation in 1983 proposed increasing the area of Clackline Nature Reserve by 278 hectares (690 acres).

One of the conditions for environmental approval for clearing for construction of Fiona Stanley Hospital was that "41.2 hectares [102 acres] ... of breeding and limited foraging habitat for Carnaby's Black-Cockatoo has been secured for purchase as is to be included in the Clackline Nature Reserve". Approximately 45 hectares (110 acres) of suitable vegetation was purchased in 2008/09 for inclusion into the reserve. The process of including the purchased land in the reserve had commenced by May 2009.
