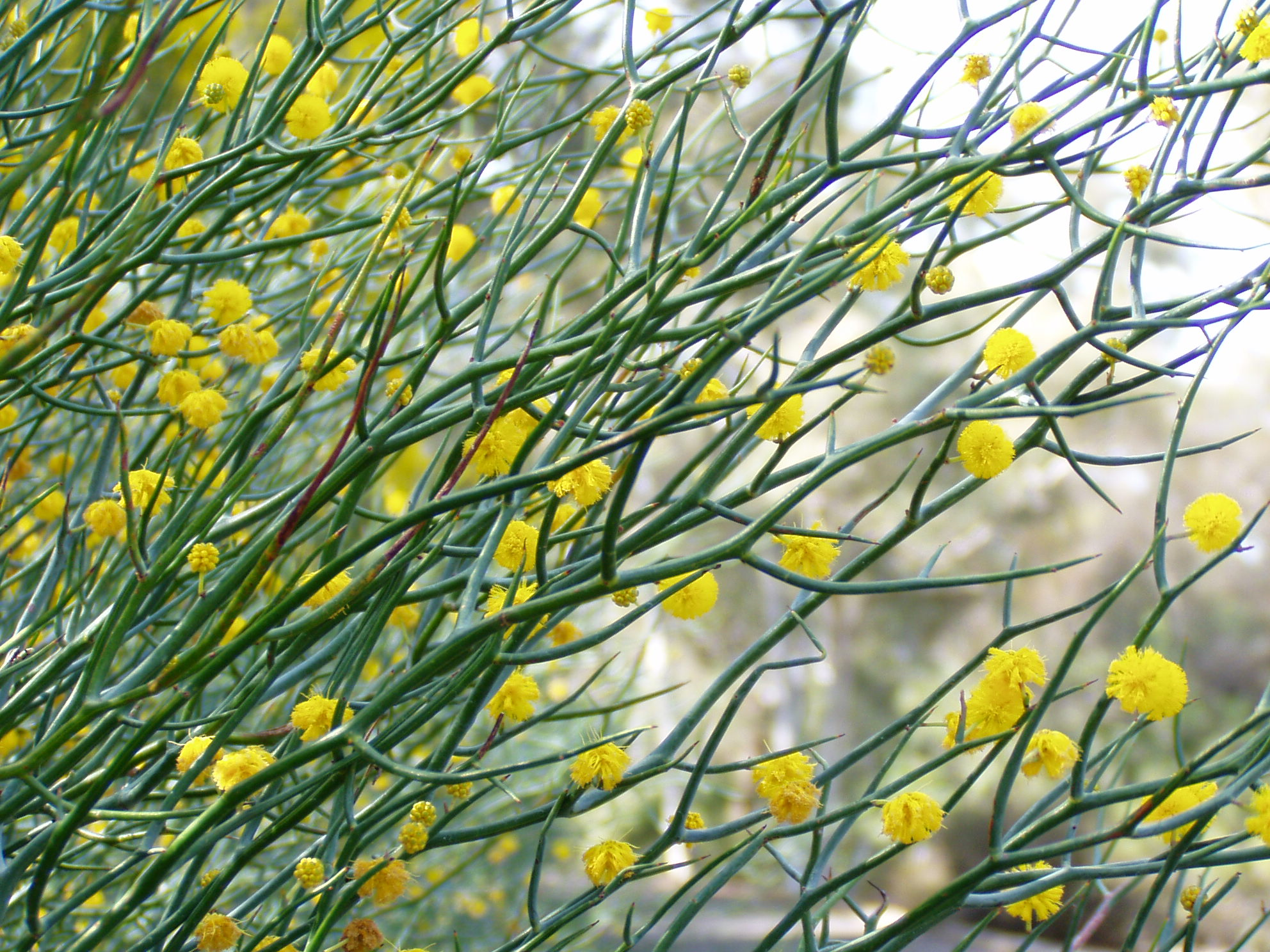

Conservation status
- Vulnerable (EPBC Act)

- Vulnerable (IUCN 3.1)

Scientific classification
- Kingdom: Plantae
- Clade: Tracheophytes
- Clade: Angiosperms
- Clade: Eudicots
- Clade: Rosids
- Order: Fabales
- Family: Fabaceae
- Subfamily: Caesalpinioideae
- Clade: Mimosoid clade
- Genus: Acacia
- Species: A. aphylla

Binomial name
- Acacia aphylla Maslin
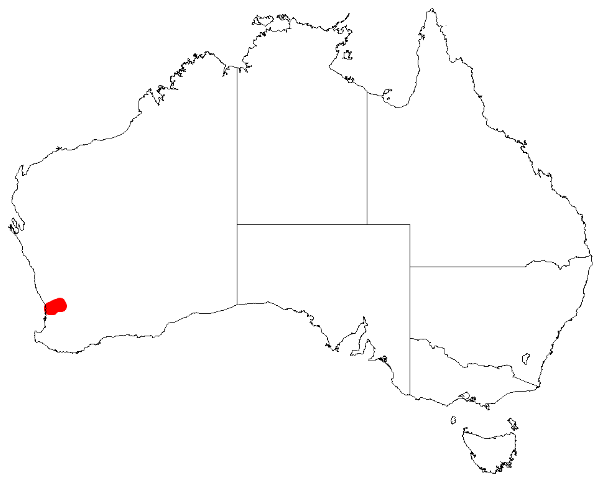
- Occurrence data from AVH

Synonyms
- Racosperma aphyllum (Maslin) Pedley

= Acacia aphylla =

Leafless rock wattle

Species of legume

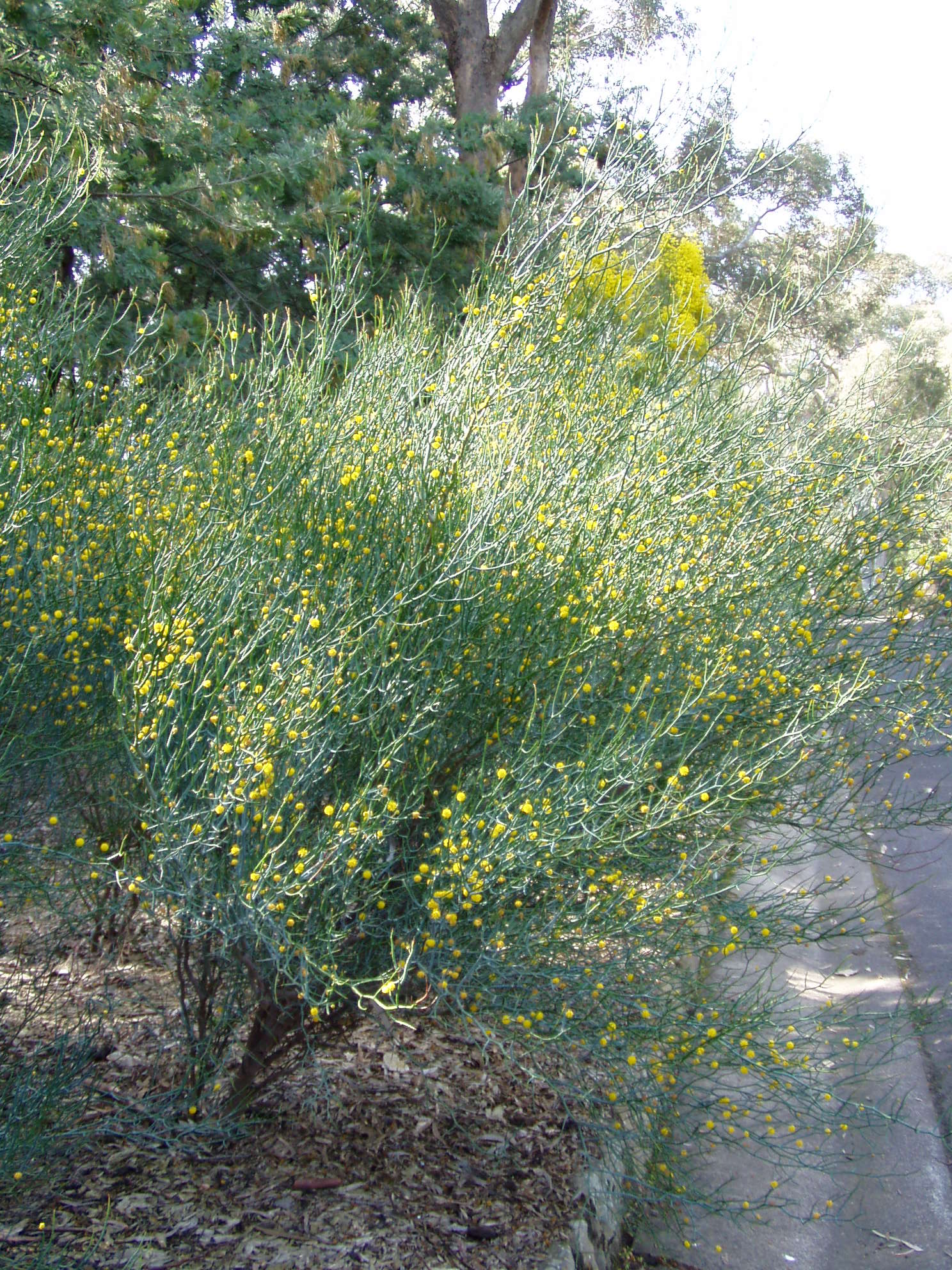
Habit

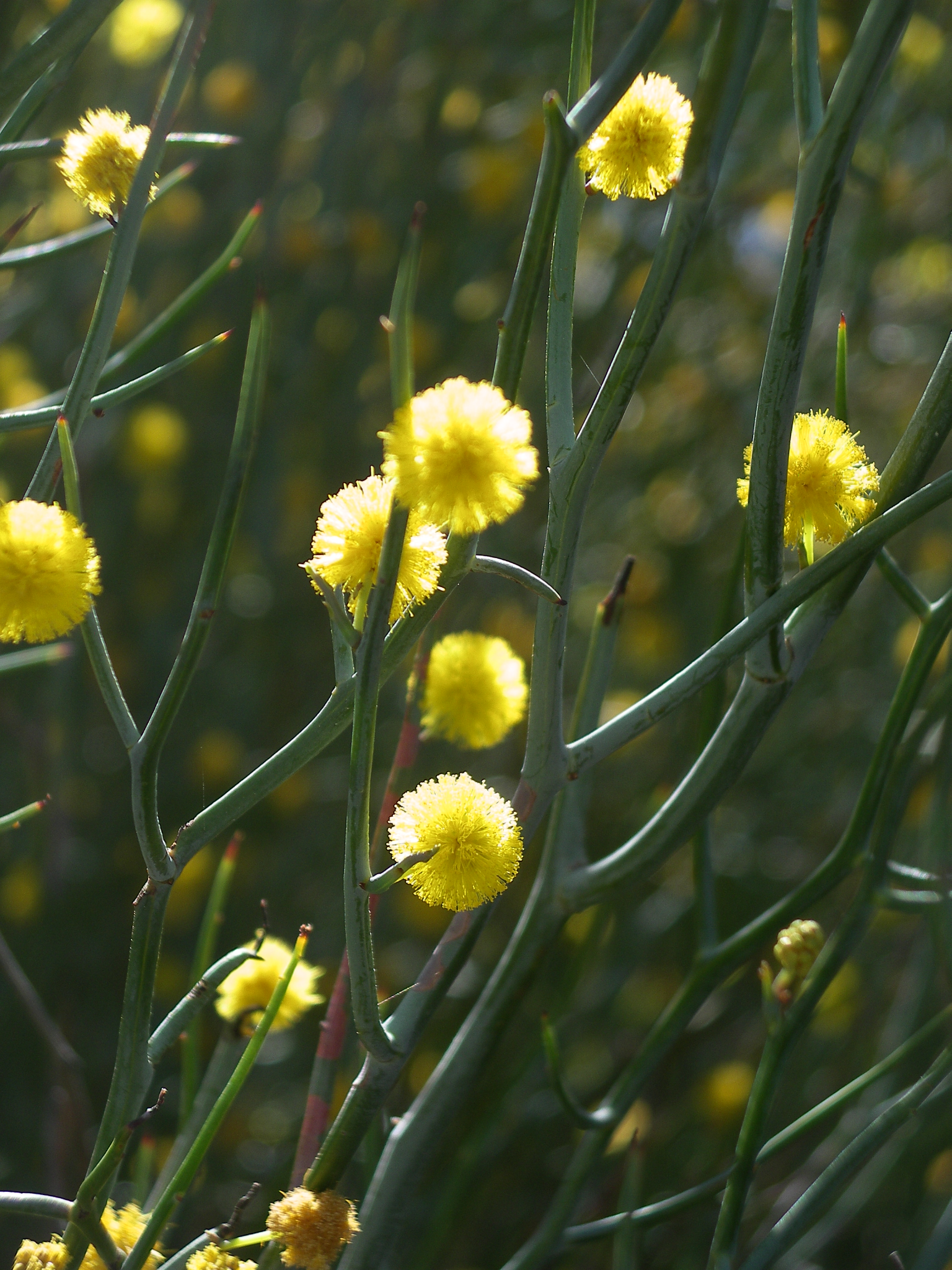
Flowers and spines

Acacia aphylla, commonly known as leafless rock wattle, is a species of flowering plant in the family Fabaceae and is endemic to an area around Perth in Western Australia. It is a widely branched shrub with glaucous, sharply-pointed branchlets, flowers arranged in spherical light golden heads, and leathery, linear pods.

== Description ==
Acacia aphylla is widely branched, spiny, glaucous, glabrous shrub that grows to a height of 0.9–3 m (2 ft 11 in – 9 ft 10 in) and has no leaves or phyllodes. The flowers are borne in spherical heads of 20 to 30 on a peduncle 7–10 mm (0.28–0.39 in) wide, and are bright, light golden. Flowering occurs from August to October, and the fruit is a leathery, linear pod 30–90 mm (1.2–3.5 in) long and 3–4 mm (0.12–0.16 in) wide containing seeds that are oblong, 4.0–4.5 mm (0.16–0.18 in) long.

== Taxonomy ==
Acacia aphylla was first formally described in 1974 by the botanist Bruce Maslin in the journal Nuytsia from specimens he collected downstream from Mundaring Weir in 1970. The specific epithet (aphylla) alludes to the lack of phyllodes, a characteristic of the species.

== Distribution and habitat ==
Leafless rock wattle has a restricted range and is only found in two areas in the Darling Range about 60 kilometres (37 mi) apart from each other. The areas are both to the east of Perth with one population being found in Hidden Valley area in the Helena River and the other south of Northam in the Clackline Nature Reserve. The species is commonly found in open forest communities that are dominated by Eucalyptus marginata and Eucalyptus calophylla, or in woodlands where Eucalyptus loxophleba dominates. Species commonly found in the understorey include Grevillea endlicheriana, Hakea petiolaris, and Xanthorrhoea preissii. It is generally associated with areas of laterite and granite outcrops on hillsides, and will grow in rock crevices. It is mostly found to grow in soils that are sandy, loam, clay, or gravel and brown or yellow in colour.

Plants are mostly killed by fire but populations will regenerate from the soil seedbank.

== Conservation status ==
Acacia aphylla is listed as vulnerable under the Australian Government Environment Protection and Biodiversity Conservation Act 1999 and as "Threatened Flora (Declared Rare Flora — Extant)" by the Government of Western Australia Department of Biodiversity, Conservation and Attractions, meaning that it is in danger of extinction.

== See also ==
- List of Acacia species
