= Maddington railway station =

Railway station in Perth, Western Australia

Maddington
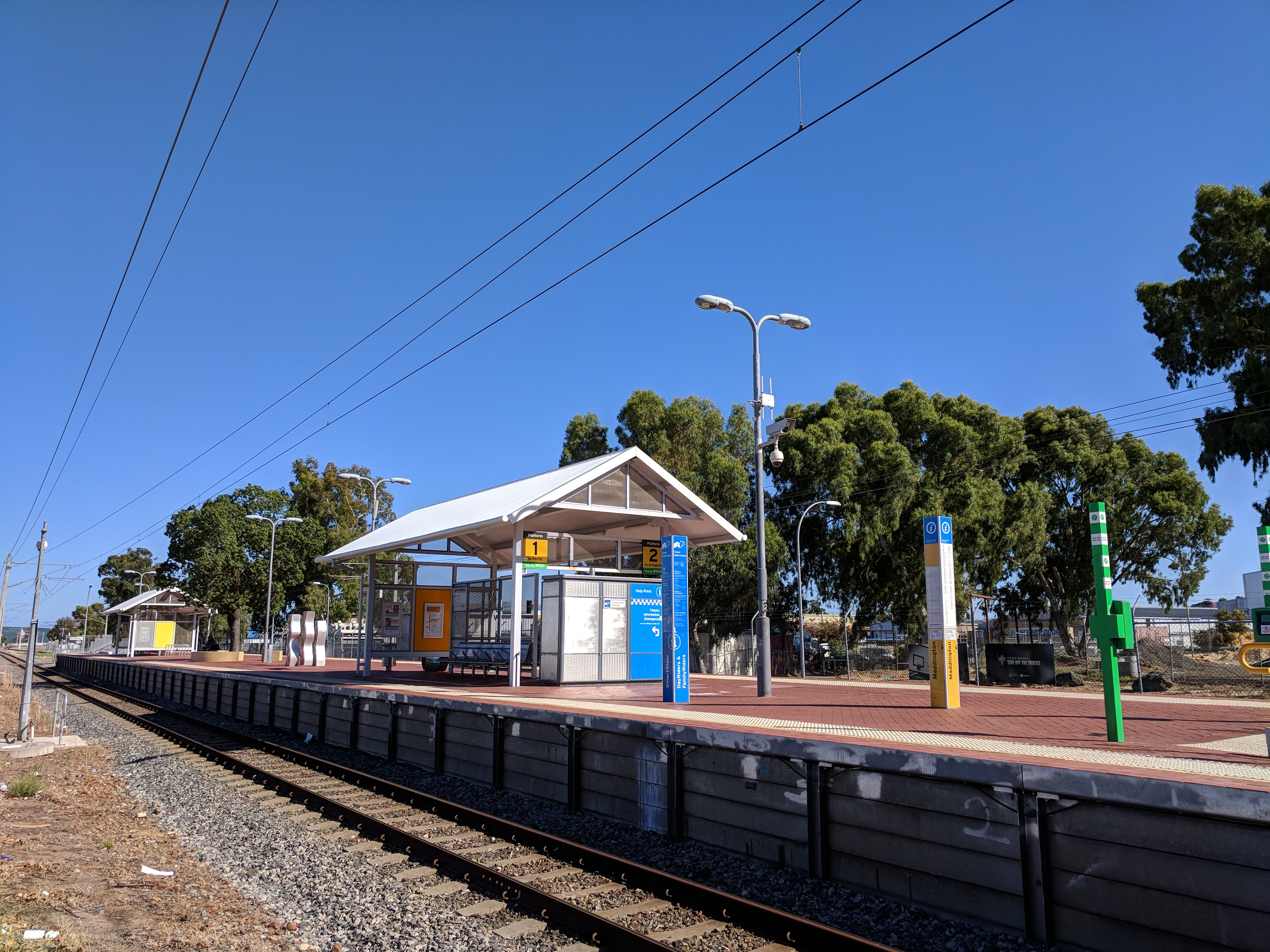
- Northbound view in February 2018

General information
- Location: Sampson Street, Maddington; Australia
- Coordinates: 32°02′59″S 115°58′58″E
- Owner: Public Transport Authority
- Operator: Transperth Train Operations
- Line: Armadale line
- Distance: 17.7 kilometres (11.0 mi) from Perth
- Platforms: 2 (1 island)
- Tracks: 2
- Bus routes: 6

Construction
- Structure type: Ground
- Accessible: Yes

Other information
- Station code: AMN; 99131 (platform 1); 99132 (platform 2)
- Fare zone: 2

Passengers
- 2013-14: 334,839

Services
Preceding station	Transperth	Following station
Kenwick towards Perth	Armadale line	Gosnells towards Byford
Former services
Preceding station	Transperth	Following station
Kenwick towards Perth	Armadale line	Stokely towards Armadale
Location
- Location of Maddington railway station

Maddington railway station is on the Transperth network. It is located on the Armadale Line, 17.7 kilometres from Perth Station serving the suburb of Maddington.

== History ==
From 26 December 1895 until February 1952, Maddington was the junction for a 700-metre branch line to Canning Racecourse.

In 2013, a major upgrade was completed to the station.

The station closed on 20 November 2023 for an 18 month shutdown to facilitate works on the Victoria Park-Canning Level Crossing Removal and Byford Rail Extension projects as part of Metronet. The station reopened on 12 October 2025 with the extension to Byford.

== Services ==
Maddington station is served by Transperth Armadale Line services.

The station saw 334,839 passengers in the 2013-14 financial year.

== Platforms ==
Maddington platform arrangement
Stop ID	Platform	Line	Destination	Via	Stopping Pattern	Notes
99131	1	Armadale line	Perth		All stations	
99132	2	Armadale line	Byford		All stations	

== Bus routes ==
Stop	Route	Destination / description	Notes
Albany Highway (north-west bound)	220	to Elizabeth Quay Bus Station via Albany Highway	
Albany Highway (north-west bound)	907	Rail replacement service to Perth Station	
Albany Highway (south-east bound)	220	to Armadale station via Albany Highway	
Albany Highway (south-east bound)	907	Rail replacement service to Armadale station	
Kelvin Road (north-east bound)	228	to Gosnells Station via Westfield Street	
Kelvin Road (north-east bound)	229	to Westfield Carousel via Kenwick & Cannington Station	
Kelvin Road (north-east bound)	279	to Kalamunda bus station via Kelvin Road, Lesmurdie Road & Canning Road	
Kelvin Road (south-west bound)	209	to Murdoch TAFE via Warton Road, Ranford Road Station & Murdoch Station	
Kelvin Road (south-west bound)	210	to Nicholson Road Station via Warton Road & Garden Street	
Kelvin Road (south-west bound)	228	to Thornlie Station via Thornlie Avenue	
Kelvin Road (south-west bound)	229	to Maddington Central	
