= Stokely railway station =

Railway station in Perth, Australia

Stokely
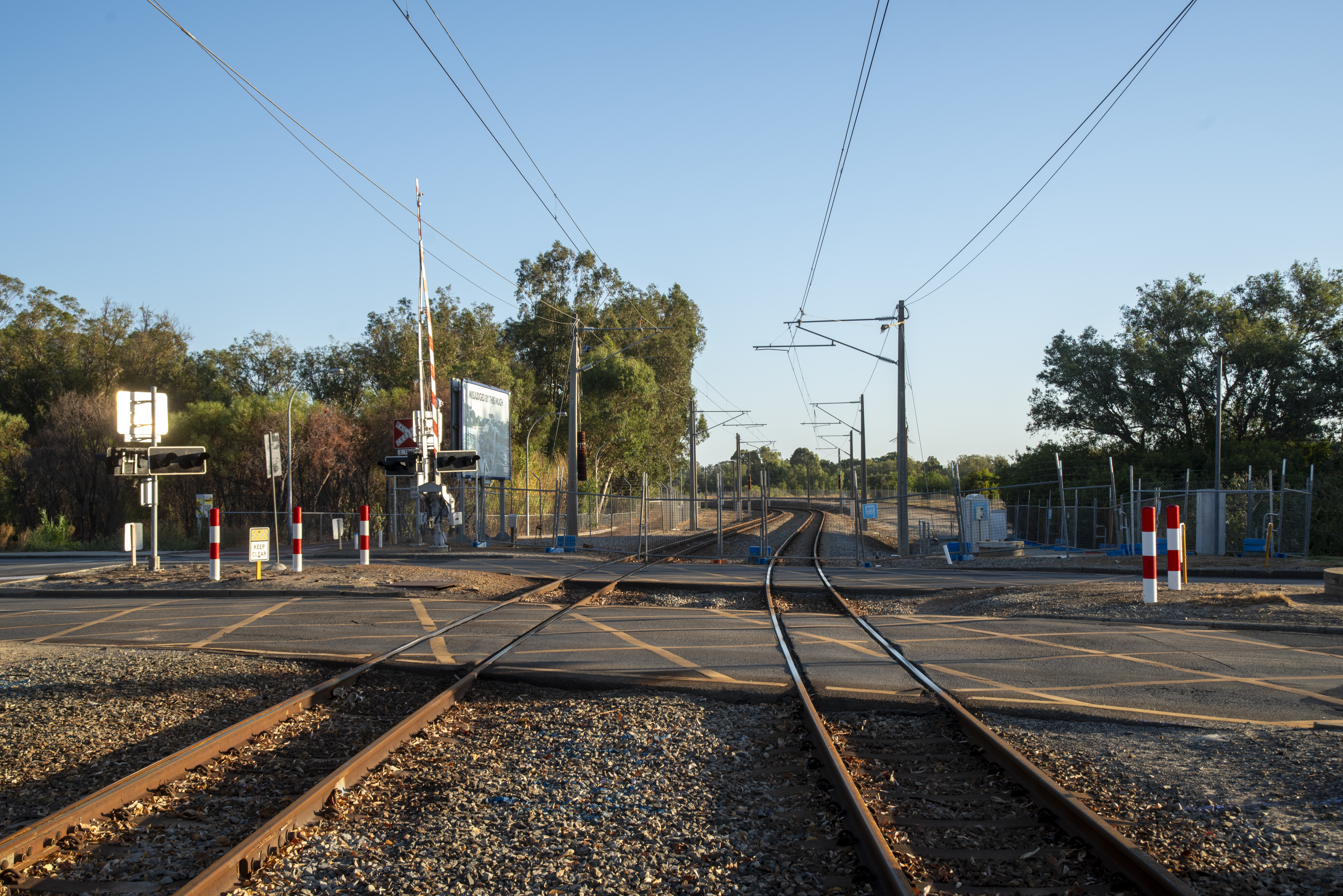
- Southbound view from the Albany Highway level crossing in March 2024, the outbound platform was on the left

General information
- Location: Albany Highway, Maddington, Western Australia; Australia
- Coordinates: 32°3′23.9″S 115°59′28.1″E
- System: Transperth
- Owner: Westrail
- Line: South Western
- Platforms: 2 side
- Tracks: 2

Other information
- Status: Demolished

History
- Opened: 28 November 1954
- Closed: 15 April 1989

Services
Preceding station	Transperth	Following station
Maddington towards Perth	Armadale line	Gosnells towards Armadale
Location

Stokely railway station was located on the South Western railway line in the suburb of Maddington, Perth, Australia. It was served by Armadale Line services as part of the Transperth network.

== History ==
Stokely station opened on 28 November 1954. It name came from suggestion by local residents derived from the nearby Stoke Farm. It had two staggered platforms on either side of the Albany Highway The adjacent level crossing was the first on the Western Australian Government Railways network to receive half boom gates when installed in 1958.

In 1983 the platforms were extended. It closed on 15 April 1989 due to low patronage and the electrification of the suburban network requiring greater distances between stations. It was demolished within weeks.
