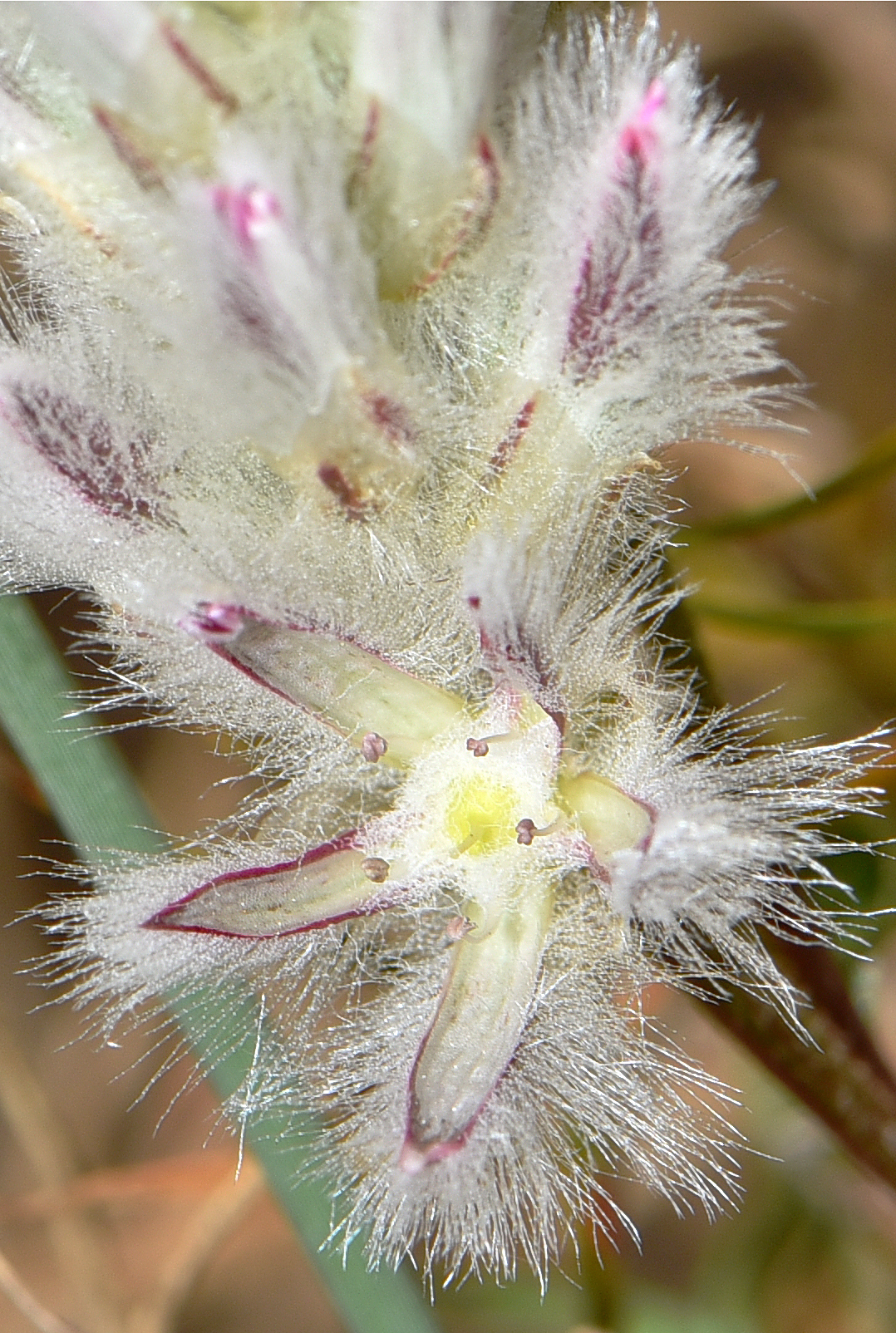

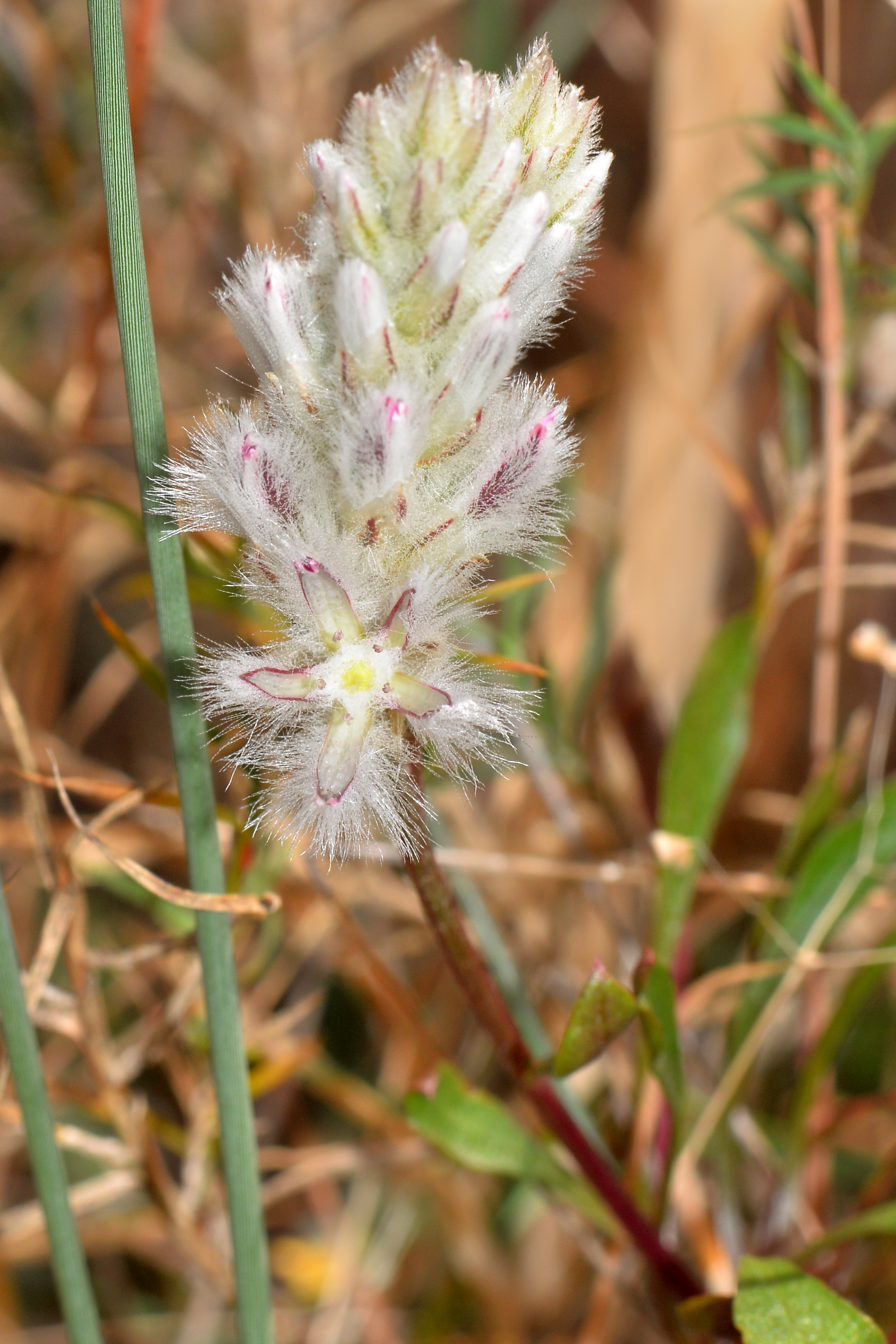

Conservation status
- Critically endangered (EPBC Act)

Scientific classification
- Kingdom: Plantae
- Clade: Embryophytes
- Clade: Tracheophytes
- Clade: Spermatophytes
- Clade: Angiosperms
- Clade: Eudicots
- Order: Caryophyllales
- Family: Amaranthaceae
- Genus: Ptilotus
- Species: P. pyramidatus

Binomial name
- Ptilotus pyramidatus (Moq.) F.Muell.

Synonyms
- Ptilotus christineae R.W.Davis & Tauss; Ptilotus sp. Brixton (C.Tauss 4136); Trichinium pyramidatum Moq.

= Ptilotus pyramidatus =

Species of herb

Ptilotus pyramidatus, commonly known as pyramid mulla mulla, is a species of flowering plant of the family Amaranthaceae and is endemic to the south-west of Western Australia. It is a perennial herb with a single stem, spoon-shaped leaves at the base of the plant, lance-shaped to spoon-shaped stem leaves and loosely cylindrical spikes of white and pink flowers.

== Description ==
Ptilotus pyramidatus is a perennial herb that typically grows to a height of 8 cm (3.1 in) and has a single, erect stem, sometimes with sparse white hairs or glabrous. The leaves at the base of the plant are spatula-shaped, 8–35 mm (0.31–1.38 in) long and 2–10 mm (0.079–0.394 in) wide, the stem leaves are lance-shaped with the narrower end towards the base, or spatula-shaped 8–15 mm (0.31–0.59 in) long and 2–5 mm (0.079–0.197 in) wide. The flowers are borne on short pedicels in egg-shaped spikes on the ends of the branches, maturing to loosely cylindrical spikes 30–45 mm (1.2–1.8 in) long and 18–25 mm (0.71–0.98 in) wide. The bracts are broadly egg-shaped with the narrower end towards the base, 4.2–5.0 mm (0.17–0.20 in) long with a pink to maroon midrib. The bracteoles are similar to the bracts, 5–6 mm (0.20–0.24 in) long with slightly curved tips. The outer tepals are lance-shaped, concave, 9.0–9.4 mm (0.35–0.37 in) long, white with pink edges and glabrous on the upper surface, pink and densely hairy on the lower surface. The inner tepals are similar to the outer tepals but narrower and 8.5–8.7 mm (0.33–0.34 in) long. There are five white stamens that age to pinkish and the style is straight, 1.8–2 mm (0.071–0.079 in) long and the ovary is stalked, glabrous and green.

== Taxonomy ==
This species was first formally described in 1849 by Alfred Moquin-Tandon who gave it the name Trichinium pyramidatum in de Candolle's Prodromus Systematis Naturalis Regni Vegetabilis. In 1868, Ferdinand von Mueller transferred the species to Ptilotus as P. pyramidatus in his Fragmenta Phytographiae Australiae.

In 2012, examination of the type material of P. pyramidatus confirmed that it is conspecific with P. christineae, reducing P. christineae to synonymy. The collection of P. christineae in Perth in 2010 represent the first collections of P. pyramidatus for more than 160 years.

== Distribution and habitat ==
Ptilotus pyramidatus is only known from one small population near Kenwick in a seasonally inundated floodplain at an elevation of about 6.5 m (21 ft) above sea level, in an area estimated to be less than 0.2 ha (0.49 acres).

== Conservation status ==
Pyramid mulla mulla is listed as "critically endangered" under the Australian Government Environment Protection and Biodiversity Conservation Act 1999 and as "threatened" by the Government of Western Australia Department of Biodiversity, Conservation and Attractions, meaning that it is in danger of extinction.
