= Kenwick railway station =

Railway station in Perth, Western Australia

Kenwick
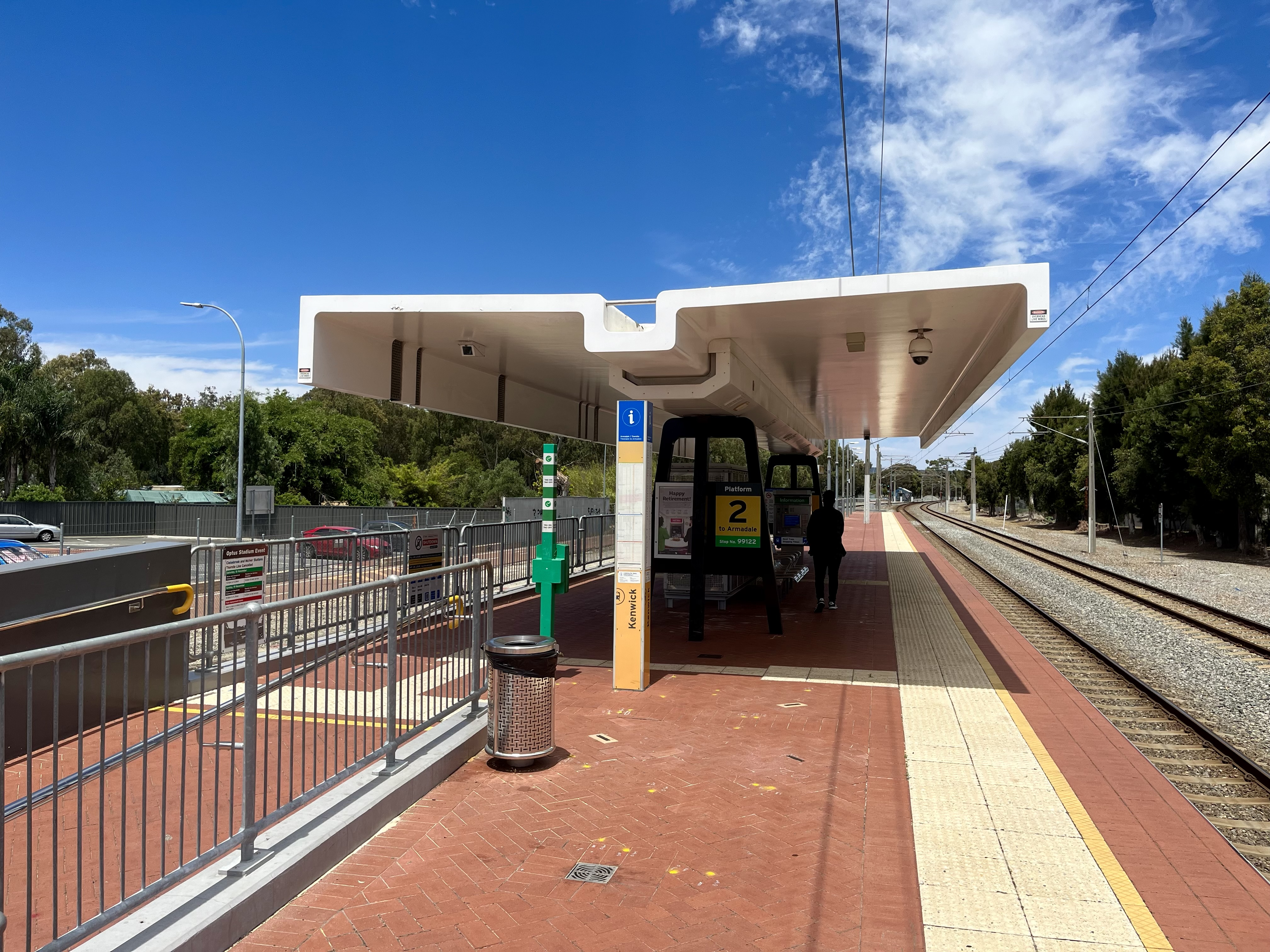
- Kenwick station in November 2023

General information
- Location: Wanaping Road, Kenwick; Western Australia; Australia
- Coordinates: 32°02′11″S 115°58′12″E
- Owner: Public Transport Authority
- Operator: Transperth Train Operations
- Line: Armadale line
- Distance: 15.8 km (9.8 mi) from Perth
- Platforms: 2 side
- Tracks: 2

Construction
- Structure type: Ground
- Accessible: Yes

Other information
- Fare zone: 2

History
- Opened: 1914

Passengers
- 2013–14: 148,340

Services
Preceding station	Transperth	Following station
Beckenham towards Perth	Armadale line	Maddington towards Byford
Location
- Location of Kenwick railway station

Kenwick railway station is located on the Transperth network. It is located on the Armadale Line, 15.8 kilometres from Perth Station serving the suburb of Kenwick.

== History ==
Kenwick station opened in 1914. In 1982–83, the platforms were extended. The station closed on 31 March 2014 for a six-month upgrade. It reopened on 27 October 2014.

The station was closed on 20 November 2023 for 18 months to facilitate works on the Victoria Park-Canning Level Crossing Removal and Byford Rail Extension projects, as well as major rail maintenance work along the section of line where construction wasn't taking place. The station reopened with the remainder of the line from Cannington to Byford on 12 October 2025.

Opposite the station lies a connection to the Kwinana freight line.

== Services ==
Kenwick station is served by Transperth Armadale Line services.

The station saw 148,340 passengers in the 2013-14 financial year.

== Platforms ==
Kenwick platform arrangement
Stop ID	Platform	Line	Destination	Via	Stopping Pattern	Notes
99121	1	Armadale line	Perth		All stations	
99122	2	Armadale line	Byford		All stations	
