= Kenwick Pioneer Cemetery =

Heritage site and cemetery in Kenwick, Western Australia

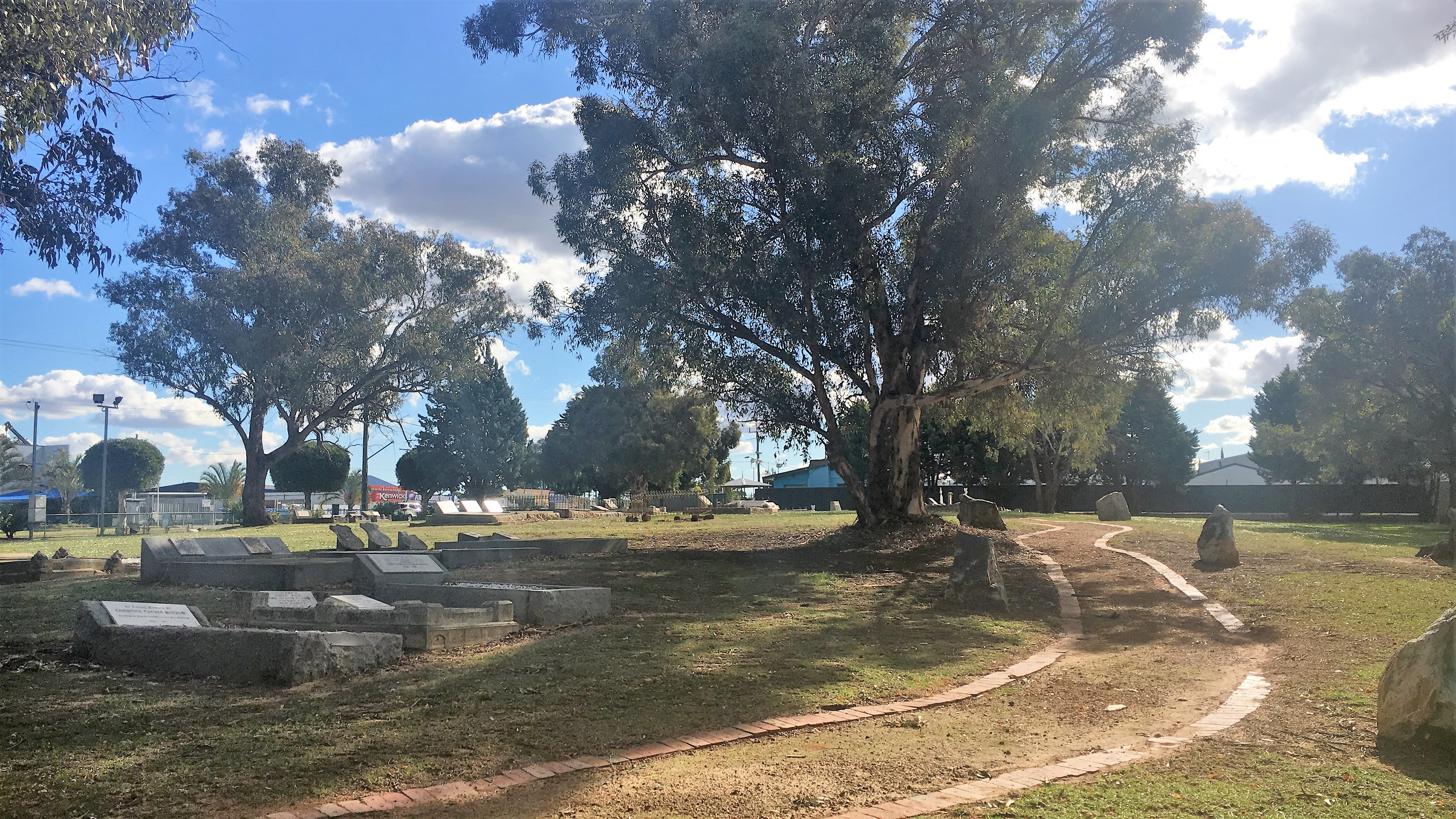

- Location within Perth
- Interactive map of Kenwick Pioneer Cemetery

Details
- Established: 1866
- Closed: 2001
- Location: Kenwick, Western Australia
- Country: Australia
- Coordinates: 32°02′32″S 115°58′23″E
- Owned by: City of Gosnells
- Find a Grave: Kenwick Pioneer Cemetery

Western Australia Heritage Register
- Official name: Kenwick Pioneer Cemetery
- Type: Municipal Inventory
- Designated: 9 May 2017
- Reference no.: 3248
- Municipality: City of Gosnells

Register of the National Estate
- Official name: Kenwick Pioneer Cemetery
- Type: Historic
- Criteria: A.4, D.2, F.1
- Designated: 30 June 1992
- Reference no.: 18075
- Place File Number: 5/13/011/0002

Kenwick Pioneer Cemetery is located in Kenwick, Western Australia adjacent to Albany Highway. It is part of the 1.2 hectares (3 acres) of land donated by Wallace Bickley for a school for the children of the Canning in 1863.

In 1865 a rammed earth building with shingle roof was constructed by convicts. Kenwick School, sometimes referred to as Canning School, opened with six pupils and was the district's only school for 20 years. The school, with accommodation for a school teacher and police constable, served as school, courthouse, church, post office and social centre for many years.

The first meeting of the Canning Roads Board met in the school room in 1870. Members were

- W.L. Gibbs,
- E. Powell,
- T. Buckingham Jnr,
- J. White,
- E.M. Marsh,
- F. Watts, and
- F. Bird.

A church, St Michael and All Angels, was built on a site next to the school and served the district until the end of the century.

The school closed in 1896 and in 1900 the school and church were demolished. Only the cemetery remains. Over 200 people were buried at the cemetery during its use, however few grave stones remain.
