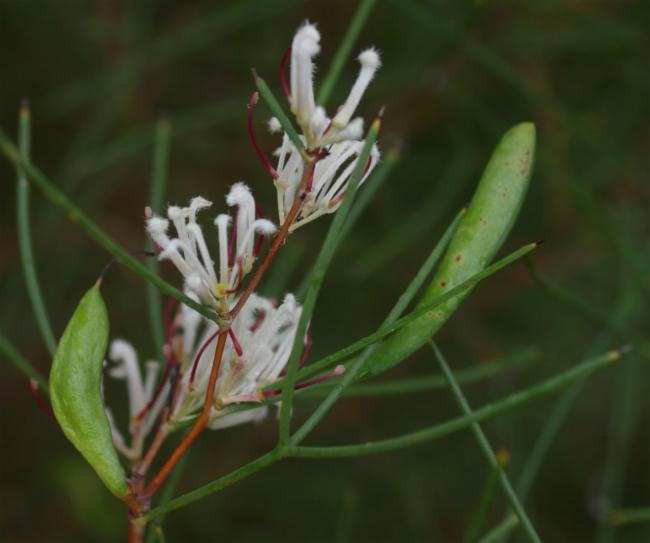
- Hakea trifurcata growing near Perth

Scientific classification
- Kingdom: Plantae
- Clade: Tracheophytes
- Clade: Angiosperms
- Clade: Eudicots
- Order: Proteales
- Family: Proteaceae
- Genus: Hakea
- Species: H. trifurcata

Binomial name
- Hakea trifurcata (Sm.)R.Br.

= Hakea trifurcata =

Two-leaved hakea

Species of shrub endemic to Western Australia

Hakea trifurcata, commonly known as two-leaf, two-leaved hakea, or kerosene bush, is a shrub, endemic to the south-west of Western Australia. The species has two leaf forms, needle-like or oblong egg-shaped. Unlike most hakea species the fruit remain green at maturity and resemble the broader leaf form. The mimicry creates a camouflage, reducing predation of the seed by granivores in particular cockatoos.

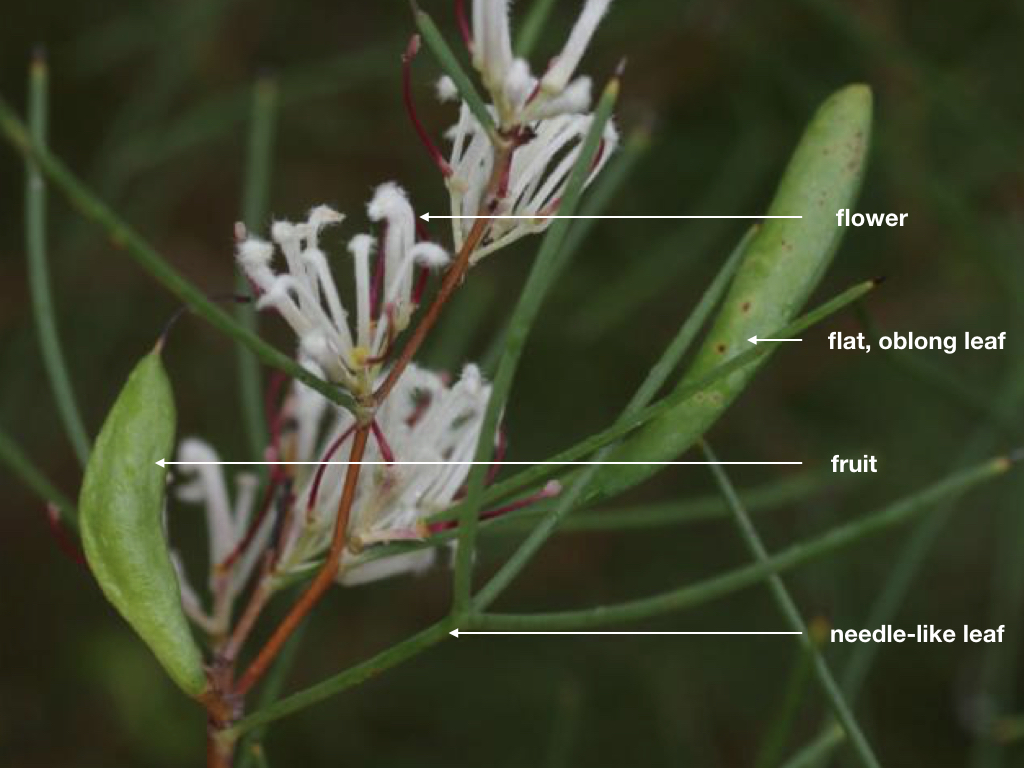
Labelled image showing fruit and dimorphic leaves

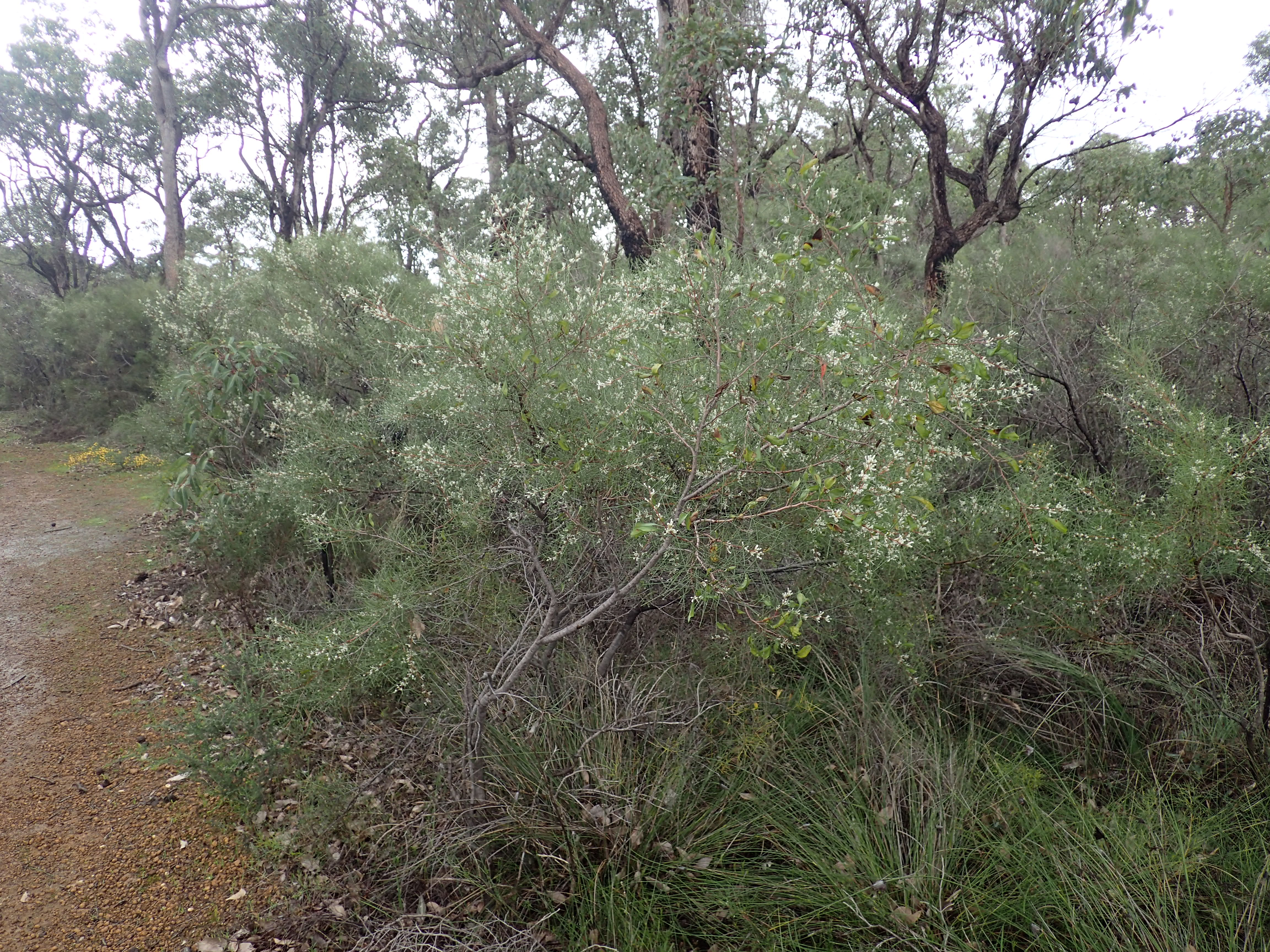
Habit in the Brixton Street Wetlands

== Description ==
Hakea trifurcata is an open or dense shrub 0.4–3 m (1 ft 4 in – 9 ft 10 in) high and about 3.5 m (11 ft) wide. It does not form a lignotuber. The branchlets have white or rusty coloured flattened, short soft silky hairs or are densely covered in soft hairs and quickly become smooth. The shrub has two forms of leaves usually needle-like, curved, straight or may be divided in segments, 2.2–7.5 cm (0.87–2.95 in) long and 0.8–1.3 mm (0.031–0.051 in) wide, grooved below and ending in a sharp point. The second form is wider, oblong to egg-shaped 2–5 cm (0.79–1.97 in) long, 6–19 mm (0.24–0.75 in) wide with a central vein and is either wedge-shaped at the apex or narrows gradually. Both leaf shapes have flattened, dense, silky rusty or white hairs but quickly become smooth. The inflorescence consists of between one and ten sweetly, strongly scented cream, white or pink flowers often with red styles. The clusters of flowers appear in leaf axils, producing nectar attractive to bees and birds. However the flower scent is conversely described by editors in Flora of Australia as "a strong smell, sometimes described as fetid". The flowers are surrounded by overlapping bracts 4.5–5.5 mm (0.18–0.22 in) long. The pedicels are 3–4 mm (0.12–0.16 in) long and covered with cream or rusty coloured hairs that are either short, soft and thickly matted or with flattened silky hairs, both forms extending onto the 6.5–10 mm (0.26–0.39 in) long perianth. The green fruit are smooth, obliquely egg-shaped and appear to resemble flat leaves, 1.5–2.5 cm (0.6–1 in) long and 0.5–0.8 mm (0.020–0.031 in) wide. The fruit of this Hakea species are not beaked or woody. Flowering occurs between April and October.

== Taxonomy and naming ==
Hakea trifurcata was first formally described by Robert Brown in 1810 and published the description in Transactions of the Linnean Society of London. Hakea trifurcata is named from the Latin tres, referring to the three forked leaves.

== Distribution and habitat ==
Two-leaf hakea is a widespread species growing from north of Geraldton to east of Esperance. Two-leaved hakea grows in a variety of soils including sand or laterite in mallee or low heathland.

== Ecology ==
Hakea trifurcata has two distinct leaf forms, either needle-shaped or a broader oblong leaf visually similar to the fruit. The broader leaves only form when the shrub reaches sexual maturity and produces fruit. Unlike that of most other hakeas the fruit of Hakea trifurcata remain green at maturity and resemble the broader leaves of the species in shape and colour. Trials were conducted at the Perth Zoo to determine whether the broad leaves deterred granivores from foraging the fruit by the short-billed black cockatoo (Calyptorhynchus funereus latirostris) . A paper by Groom, Lamont and Duff suggested the leaves adjacent to the fruit, create camouflage protecting and shielding the fruit from predation. The broader leaf tends to double over shielding the fruit, the mimicry making it difficult to distinguish by the white-tailed cockatoo the most frequent predator of hakea fruit. The broader leaves increase in size the further away from the fruit, again possibly diverting the cockatoos from consuming the follicles. It is believed these adaptations evolved as a mechanism to reduce the destruction of seeds by granivores. It was noted by botanist and ornithologist Richard Schodde "that the short-billed black cockatoo and the yellow-tailed black cockatoo (Calyptorhynchus funereus) actively predate Hakea species, perching in the bushes to open up 'green' follicles with their bills". This species grows in fire-prone locations and does not resprout after fire, therefore continued populations require a "seed bank" to maintain numbers.

== Conservation status ==
Hakea trifurcata is classified as "not threatened" by the Western Australian Government Department of Parks and Wildlife.
