= Brixton Street Wetlands =

Wetland area in Perth, Western Australia

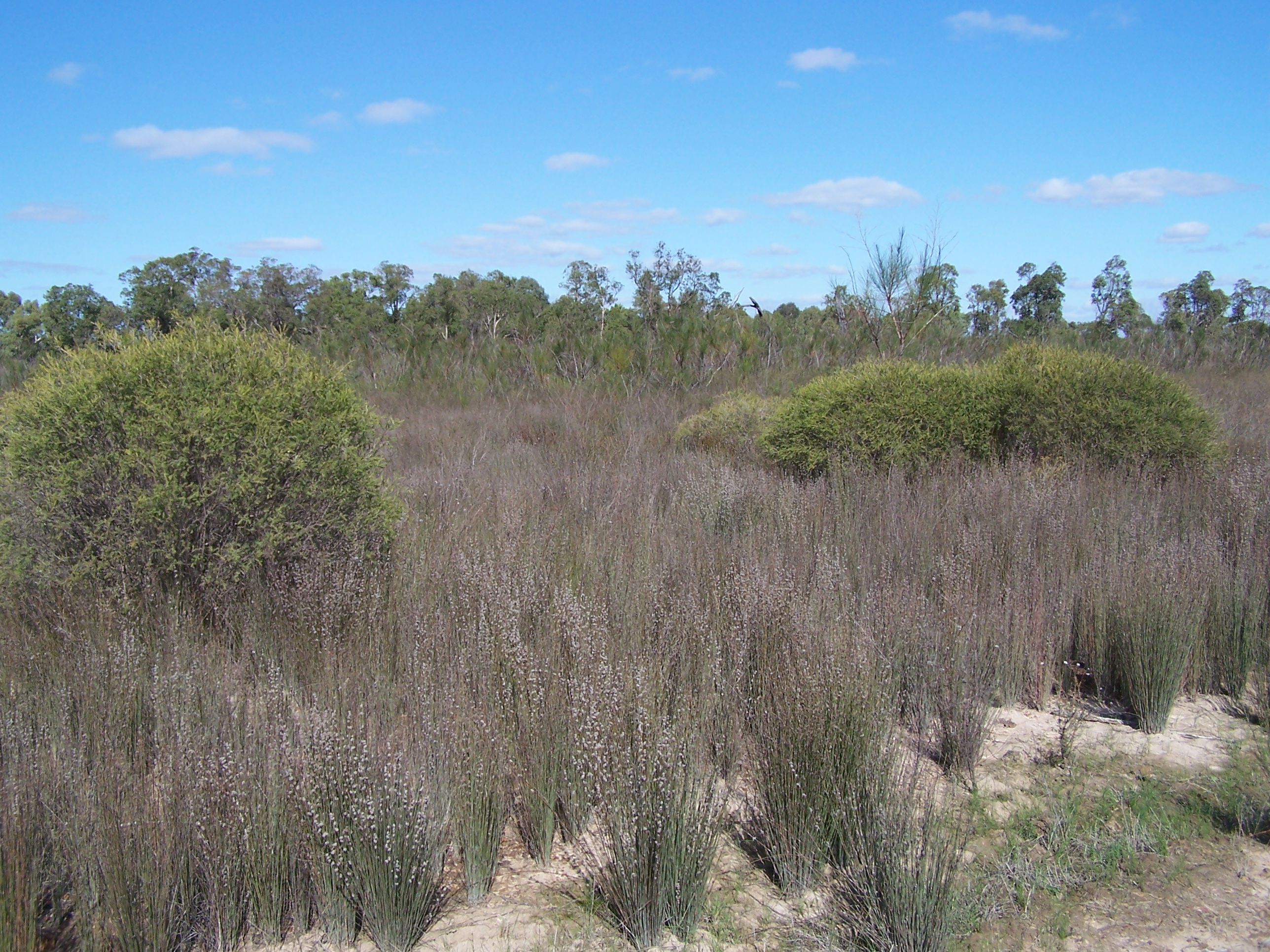
- Looking south from centre of wetlands
- Interactive map of Brixton Street Wetlands
- Location: Kenwick, Western Australia
- Coordinates: 32°02′S 115°58′E

Register of the National Estate
- Official name: Brixton Street and Associated Wetlands
- Type: Natural
- Designated: 21 November 2000
- Reference no.: 19538
- Place File Number: 5/13/011/0004

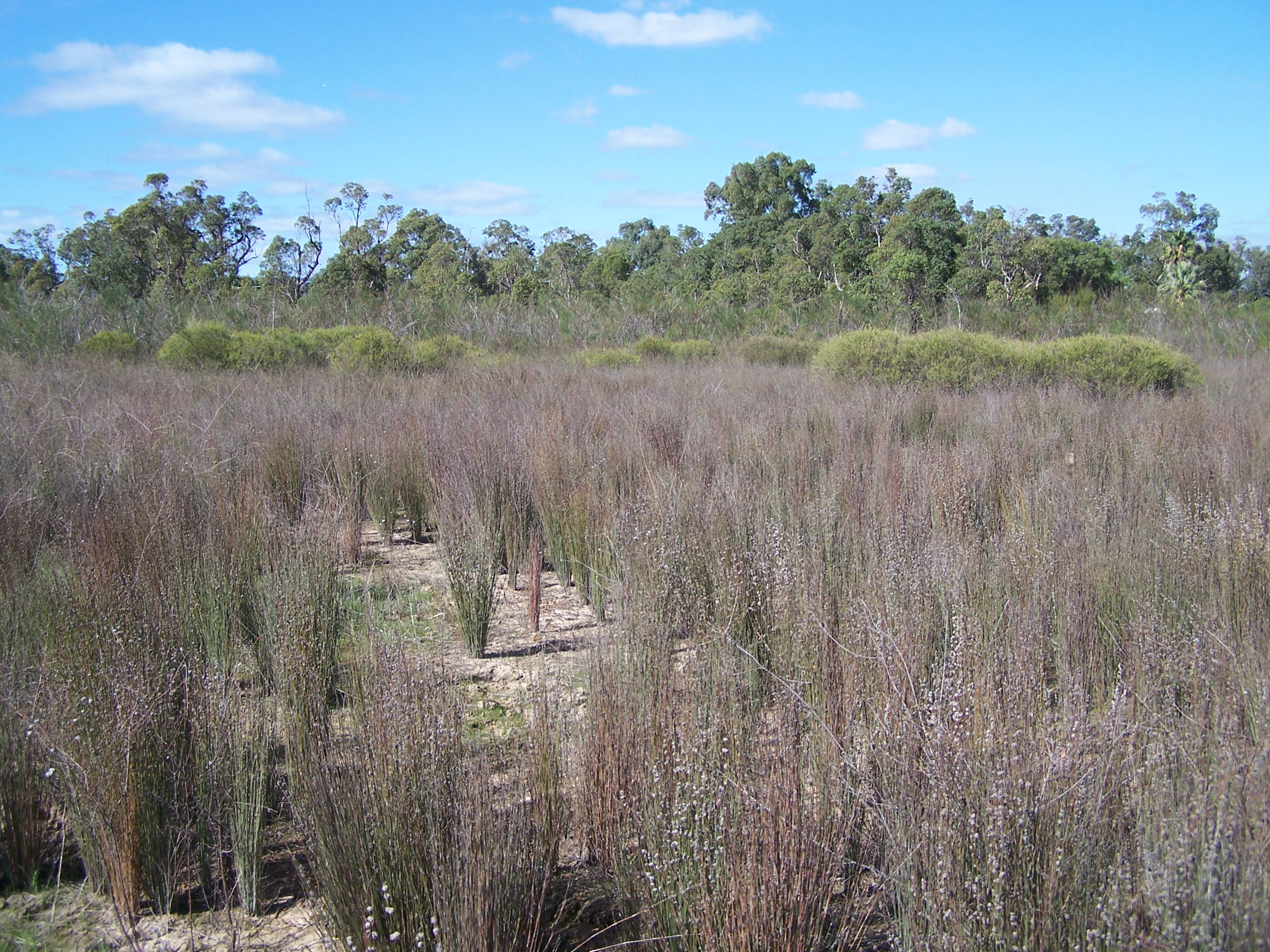
Looking south from centre of wetlands

The Brixton Street Wetlands is an environmentally significant wetland area in the city of Perth, Western Australia. The wetlands are located in the suburb of Kenwick, in the south-east of the city not far from the foot of the Darling Scarp. The Brixton Street Wetlands occupies 126 hectares (310 acres) adjoining urban residential developments, schools and remnant semi-rural properties in an area which is rapidly urbanising. Roe Highway, a major transport artery, runs along one boundary of the wetlands, together with a parallel railway line.

The wetlands contain a huge number of plant species for such a small area, some of which are rare and endangered. Over 400 plant species, comprising some 20% of the flora species of the Perth area, can be found in the wetlands. Of these, about 80 flowering plants are considered endangered and are not commonly found on the Swan Coastal Plain on which Perth is located, and the plant communities located here are in fact the last substantial wetland plant communities on the plain's claypans. Four of the species are classified as Declared Rare Flora, including Purdie's donkey orchid (Diuris purdiei).

Fauna include frogs, snakes and insects, but the wetlands are especially important as a habitat for the rare southern brown bandicoot (Isoodon obesulus), often known by its Nyoongar Aboriginal name of quenda.

The wetlands were entered into A Directory of Important Wetlands in Australia in 1992 (recorded there as the Brixton Street Swamps), and were placed on the Register of the National Estate of the Australian Heritage Commission on 21 November 2000.
