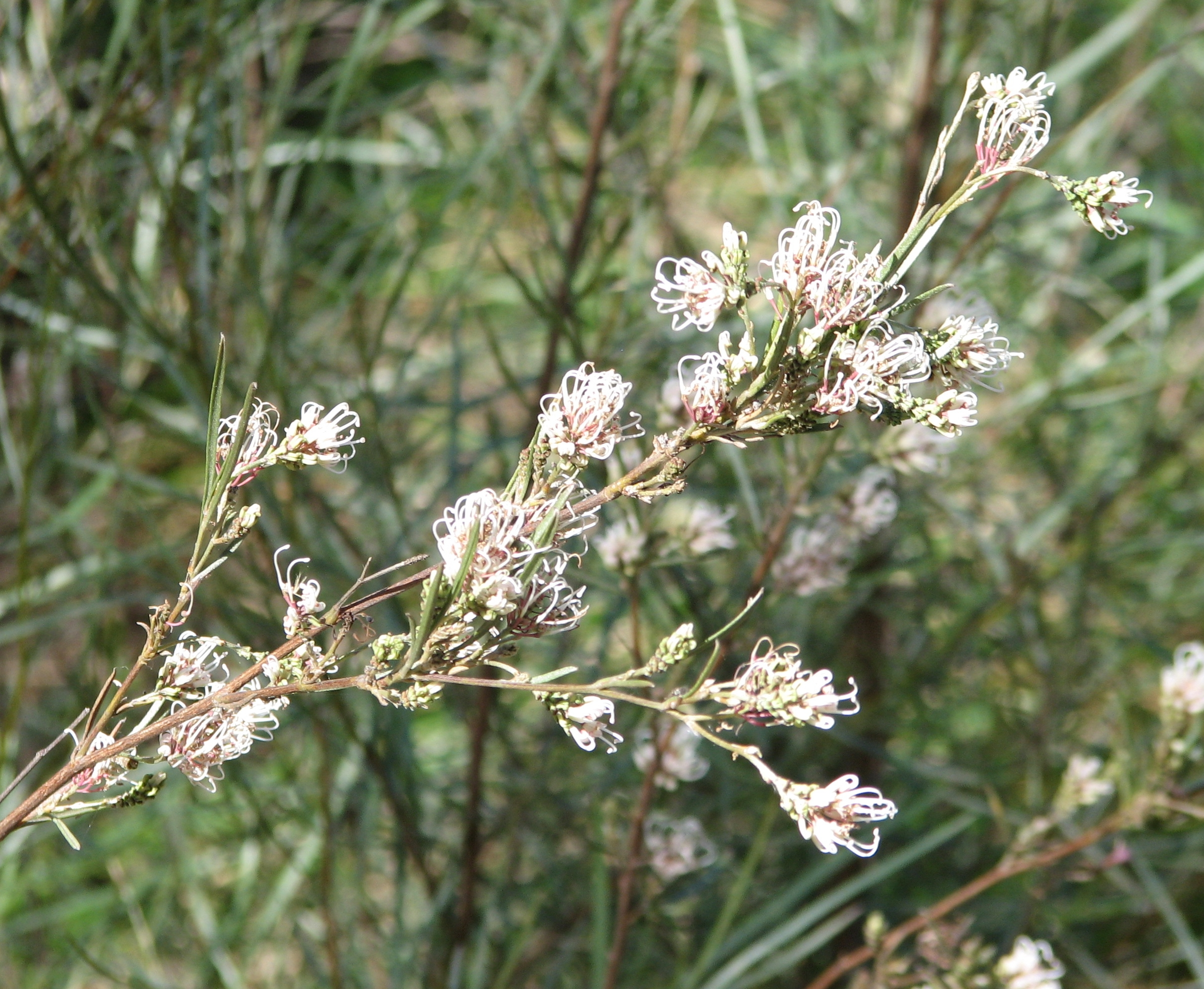
- Grevillea endlicheriana in Burnley Gardens

Conservation status
- Least Concern (IUCN 3.1)

Scientific classification
- Kingdom: Plantae
- Clade: Embryophytes
- Clade: Tracheophytes
- Clade: Spermatophytes
- Clade: Angiosperms
- Clade: Eudicots
- Order: Proteales
- Family: Proteaceae
- Genus: Grevillea
- Species: G. endlicheriana

Binomial name
- Grevillea endlicheriana Meisn.

Synonyms
- Grevillea filifolia Meisn.

= Grevillea endlicheriana =

Spindly grevillea

Species of shrub endemic to Western Australia

Grevillea endlicheriana, commonly known as spindly grevillea, is a species of flowering plant in the family Proteaceae and is endemic to the south-west of Western Australia. It is an erect shrub with linear leaves, and groups of white, pink tinged flowers.

== Description ==
Grevillea endlicheriana is an erect shrub that typically grows to a height of 1–2.5 m (3 ft 3 in – 8 ft 2 in). Its leaves are usually linear, 30–130 mm (1.2–5.1 in) long and 0.5–3 mm (0.020–0.118 in) wide. Both surfaces of the leaves are covered with silky hairs. The flowers are arranged on flowering branches on a rachis 5–20 mm (0.20–0.79 in) long and are white with a pink tinge to pale pink, the pistil 7.5–12 mm (0.30–0.47 in) long. Flowering occurs from July to November and the fruit is an elliptic to more or less spherical follicle 8.0–8.5 mm (0.31–0.33 in) long.

== Taxonomy ==
Grevillea endlicheriana was first formally described in 1845 by Carl Meissner in Plantae Preissianae, based on plant material collected from the Darling Scarp in 1839. The specific epithet (endlicheriana) honours Stephan Endlicher.

== Distribution and habitat ==
Spindly grevillea grows in woodland or shrubland between Mogumber and Kelmscott with a disjunct population near Wongan Hills, in the Avon Wheatbelt, Jarrah Forest, Mallee and Swan Coastal Plain biogeographic regions of south-western Western Australia.

== Conservation status ==
This grevillea is listed as least concern on the IUCN Red List of Threatened Species and as not threatened by the Western Australian Government Department of Biodiversity, Conservation and Attractions. Despite its relatively limited distribution, it is locally common and its population appears largely stable. There are no major threats affecting this species, either currently or in the near future.
