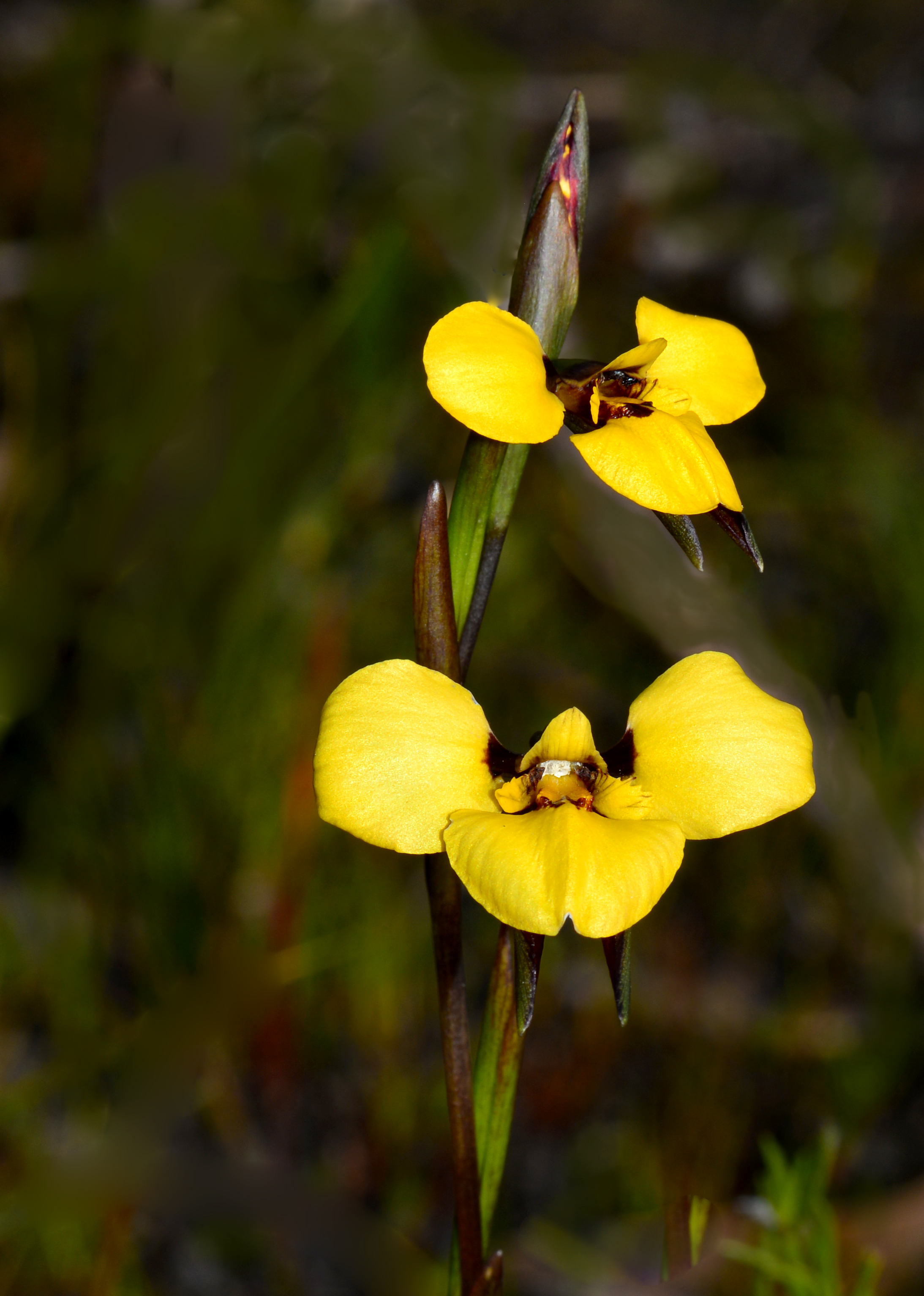
- Near Armadale

Conservation status
- Endangered (EPBC Act)

Scientific classification
- Kingdom: Plantae
- Clade: Embryophytes
- Clade: Tracheophytes
- Clade: Angiosperms
- Clade: Monocots
- Order: Asparagales
- Family: Orchidaceae
- Subfamily: Orchidoideae
- Tribe: Diurideae
- Genus: Diuris
- Species: D. purdiei

Binomial name
- Diuris purdiei Diels

= Diuris purdiei =

Purdie's donkey orchid

Species of orchid

Diuris purdiei, commonly known as Purdie's donkey orchid, is a species of orchid that is endemic to the south-west of Western Australia. It has between five and ten leaves at its base and up to eight pale yellow flowers with reddish-brown or purplish markings. It mainly grows in swampy areas and only flowers after fires the previous summer.

== Description ==
Diuris purdiei is a tuberous, perennial herb with between five and ten spirally twisted leaves in a tuft near its base. Each leaf is 50–100 mm (2–4 in) long, 2–3 mm (0.08–0.1 in) wide. Up to eight pale yellow flowers with reddish brown or purplish markings near the centre, 20–30 mm (0.8–1 in) long and 20–35 mm (0.8–1 in) wide are borne on a flowering stem 150–350 mm (6–10 in) tall. The dorsal sepal is more or less erect or curved backwards, 10–12 mm (0.4–0.5 in) long and 4–5 mm (0.16–0.20 in) wide. The lateral sepals are 14–17 mm (0.6–0.7 in) long, about 2 mm (0.08 in) wide and turned downwards. The petals spread widely apart from each other, almost held horizontally with an egg-shaped blade 8–10 mm (0.3–0.4 in) long and 7–9 mm (0.3–0.4 in) wide on a reddish brown stalk 4–5 mm (0.16–0.20 in) long. The labellum is 15–18 mm (0.6–0.7 in) long and has three lobes. The centre lobe is heart-shaped, 10–12 mm (0.4–0.5 in) wide and the side lobes are 4–5 mm (0.16–0.20 in) long and about 2 mm (0.08 in) wide with serrated edges. There are two ridge-like calli 6–7 mm (0.2–0.3 in) in the centre of the labellum near its base. Flowering occurs in September and October.

== Taxonomy and naming ==
Diuris purdiei was first formally described in 1903 by Ludwig Diels from a specimen collected near Cannington, and the description was published in Journal and Proceedings of the Mueller Botanic Society of Western Australia. The specific epithet (purdiei) honours the New Zealand born academic, Alex Purdie who collected the type specimen.

== Distribution and habitat ==
Purdie's donkey orchid grows in winter-wet swamps under dense shrubs and is found between Perth and Yarloop in the Jarrah Forest and Swan Coastal Plain biogeographic regions.

== Conservation ==
Diuris purdiei is classified as "endangered" under the Australian Government Environment Protection and Biodiversity Conservation Act 1999 and as "Threatened Flora (Declared Rare Flora — Extant)" by the Department of Environment and Conservation (Western Australia). The population of this orchid has been fragmented by urbanisation and the current threats to the species are habitat loss and weed invasion.
