= Clackline Refractory =

Brickworks site in Western Australia

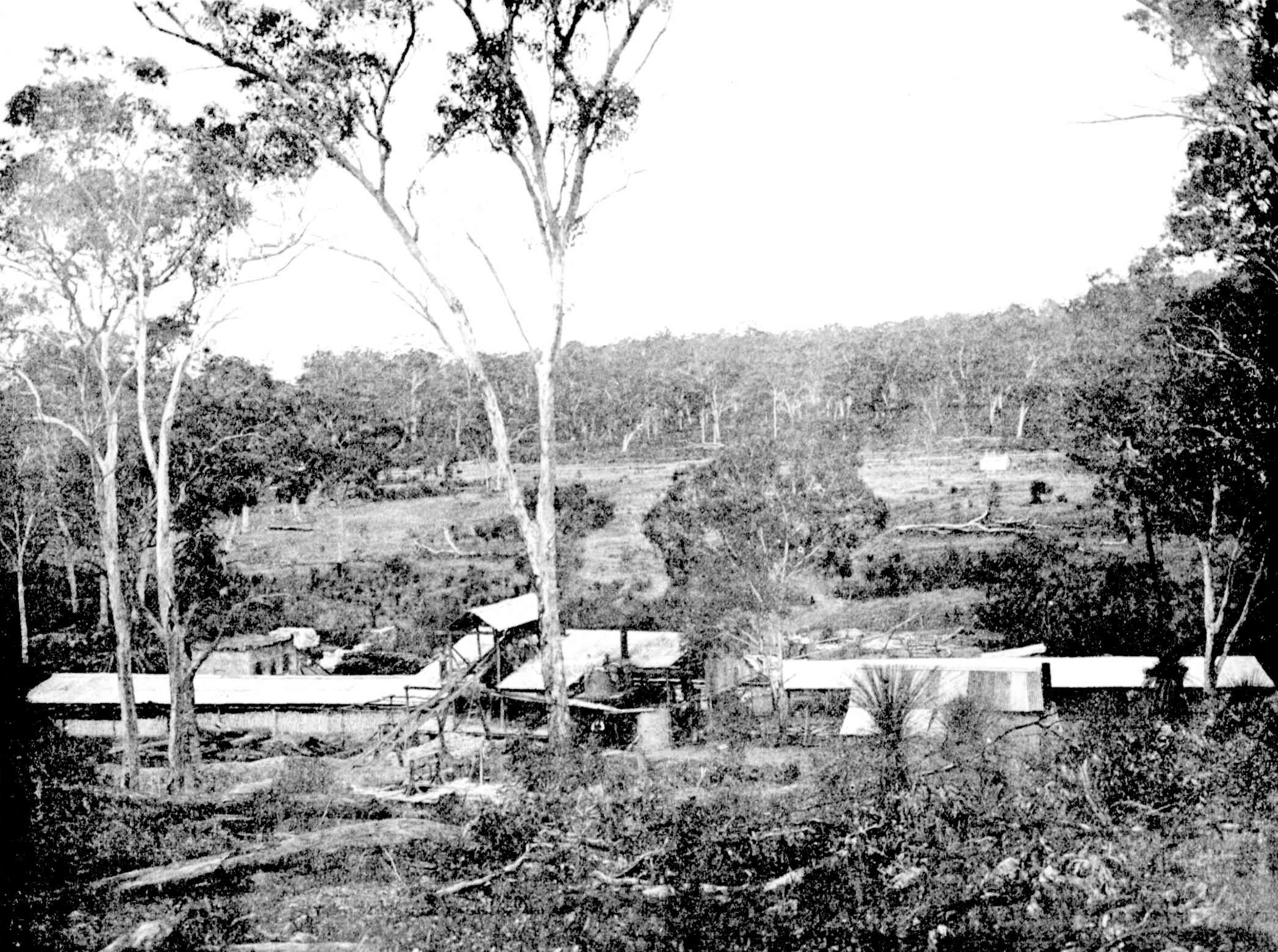
Clackline Firebrick Company area and works at the Clackline Refractory in 1901

The Clackline Refractory, also known as Clackline Clay and Brick, is a heritage listed brickworks site in Clackline, Western Australia.

== Description ==
Clackline Refractory is located on Refractory Road, Clackline, Western Australia in a valley near Great Eastern Highway. As of 2012, the site is in poor condition and mostly deserted, apart from stacks of various ceramic products. As well as kilns suitable for modern day production, the site has older kilns constructed from bricks, with corrugated iron roofs supported by metal poles. Alongside these structures is a large brick chimney.

== History ==
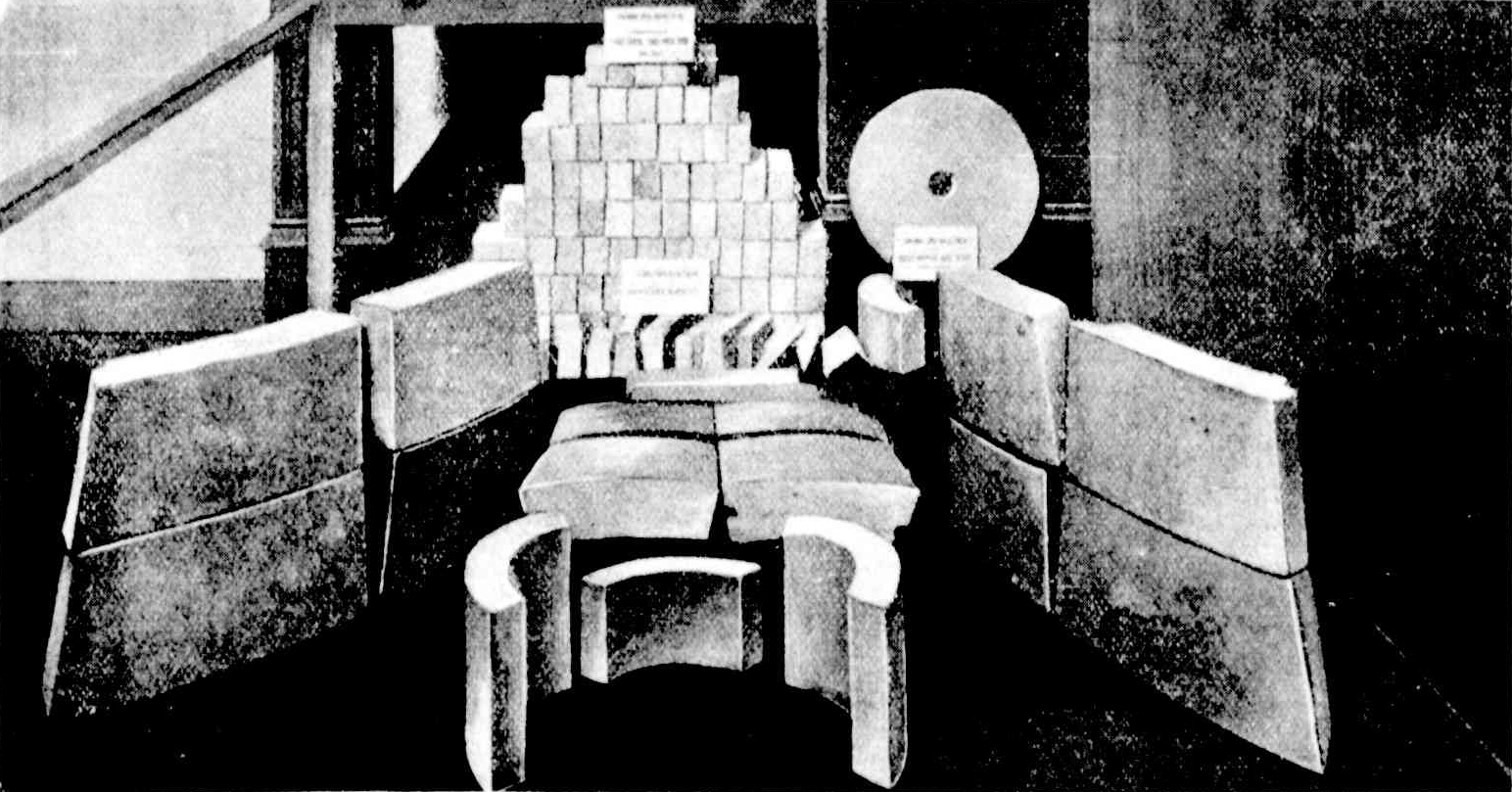
Clackline Firebrick Company display at the 1905 Perth A.N.A. Exhibition

Fine quality clay was discovered in the Clackline area in 1898 by John Ford and James Murray, while prospecting for gold. Out of several shafts sunk, no gold was discovered, but one appeared to show an abundant quantity of fire-clay. Ford and Murray formed the Clackline Firebrick Company in 1900 to test the deposit, and henceforth began operating an extensive quarry. The quarry had a practically limitless supply of clay. The quality of bricks produced by the refractory was at least comparable to those imported from England and Scotland, and at least one test showed that the imported bricks would fail before the local ones.

In 1901, the industry was important to Western Australia, with the brick products from Clackline used by multiple government departments, the Fremantle Gas Company, and many goldmines. Other users of the bricks included the Railway Department, the Perth Gas Company, the Fremantle smelter, and the Great Boulder Perseverance Company. Testimonials from users was positive.

The initial firebrick company operated for only two years, before it was taken over by the Bunnings until 1903, and the Hunter Family from then until the 1950s. In 1905, the Clackline Firebrick Company exhibited its products at the Perth Australian Natives' Association (A.N.A.) exhibition. These included firebox arches, as used on the railways; fire bricks similar to those used at the Perth gasworks; and foundry fire lunks, as used at the Midland Junction Railway Workshops.

By 1908, thousands of tonnes of clay had been mined "without making any appreciable impression upon the enormous deposit". The works had the latest machinery of that time, with drying sheds for the weeks-long process of drying large fire-lumps that occurs after they are removed from the furnace. Products the company started to make c. 1908 included paving bricks, garden tiles, and surface drain blocks. The 9-by-9-by-4-inch (230 by 230 by 100 mm) paving bricks were used by the Perth City Council along Wellington Street.

In the late 1960s, Clackline Refractory underwent an expansion, and reportedly had difficulty recruiting workers due to a shortage of accommodation in the area.
