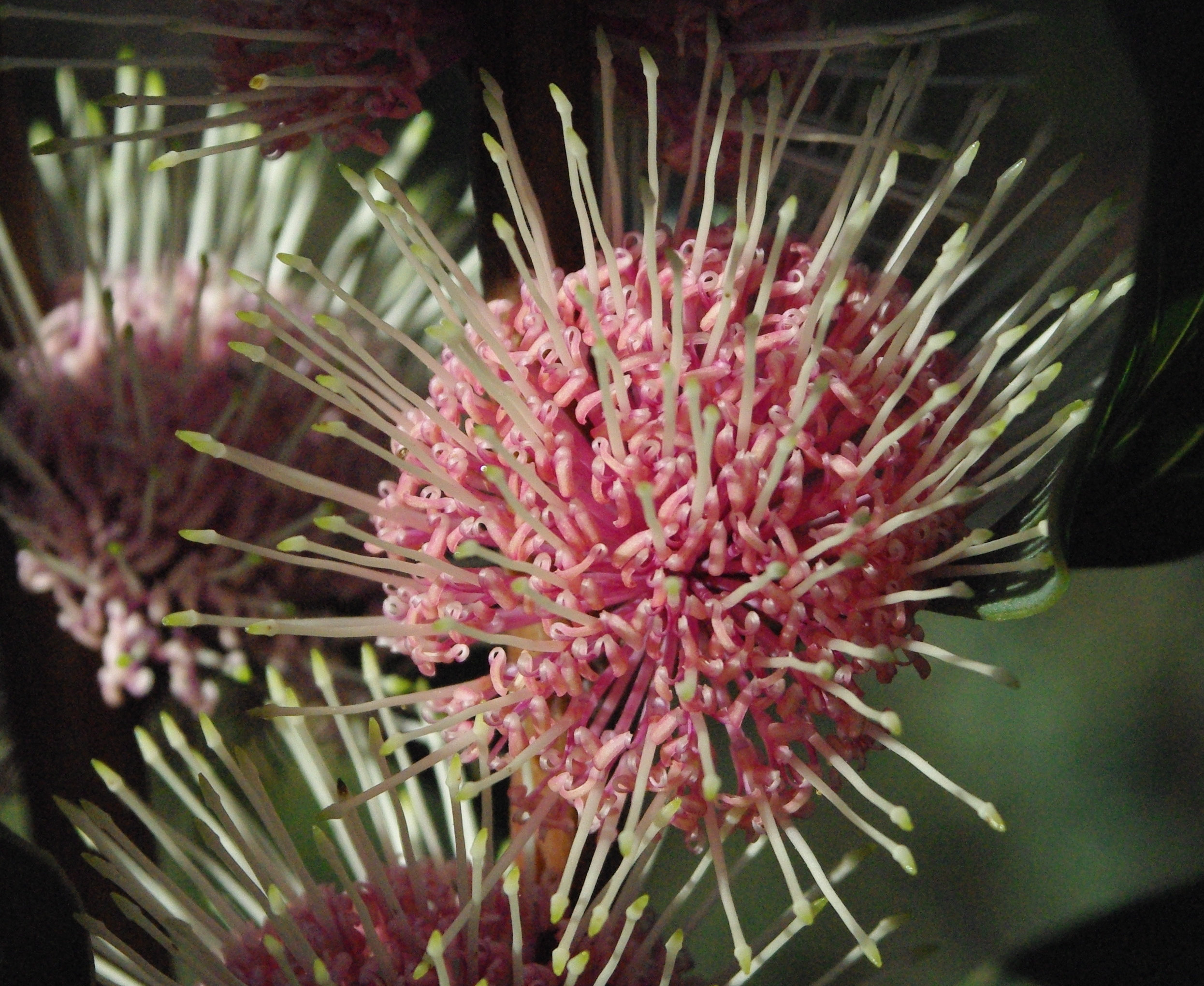

Scientific classification
- Kingdom: Plantae
- Clade: Tracheophytes
- Clade: Angiosperms
- Clade: Eudicots
- Order: Proteales
- Family: Proteaceae
- Genus: Hakea
- Species: H. petiolaris

Binomial name
- Hakea petiolaris Meisn.
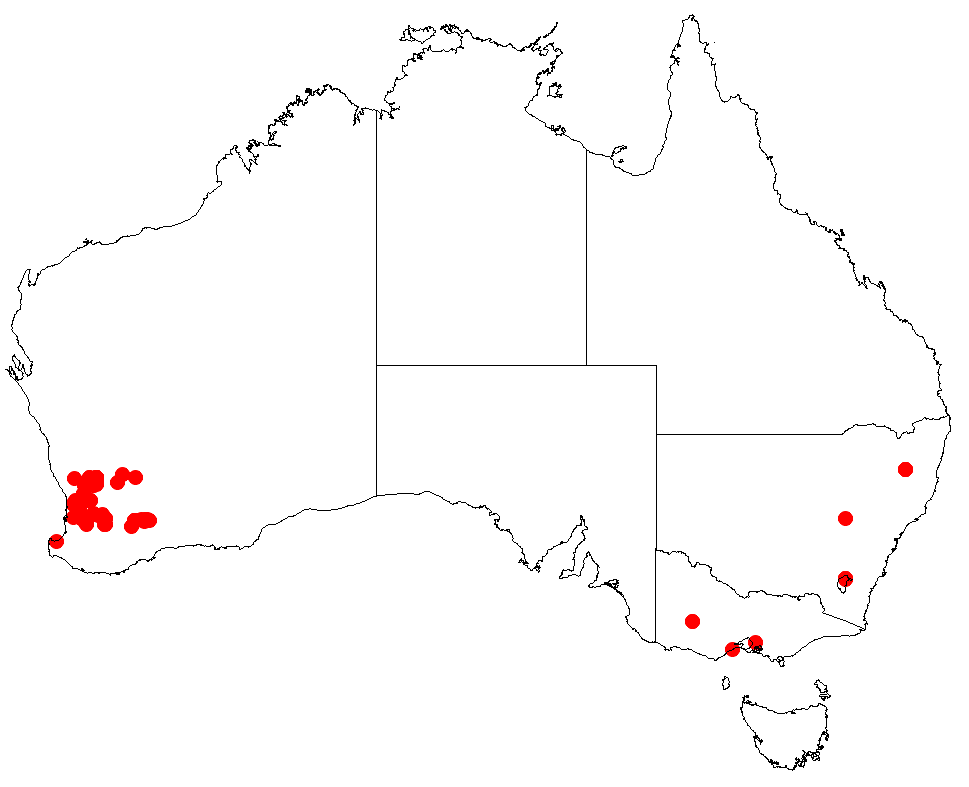
- Occurrence data from AVH

= Hakea petiolaris =

Sea urchin hakea

Species of plant endemic to Australia

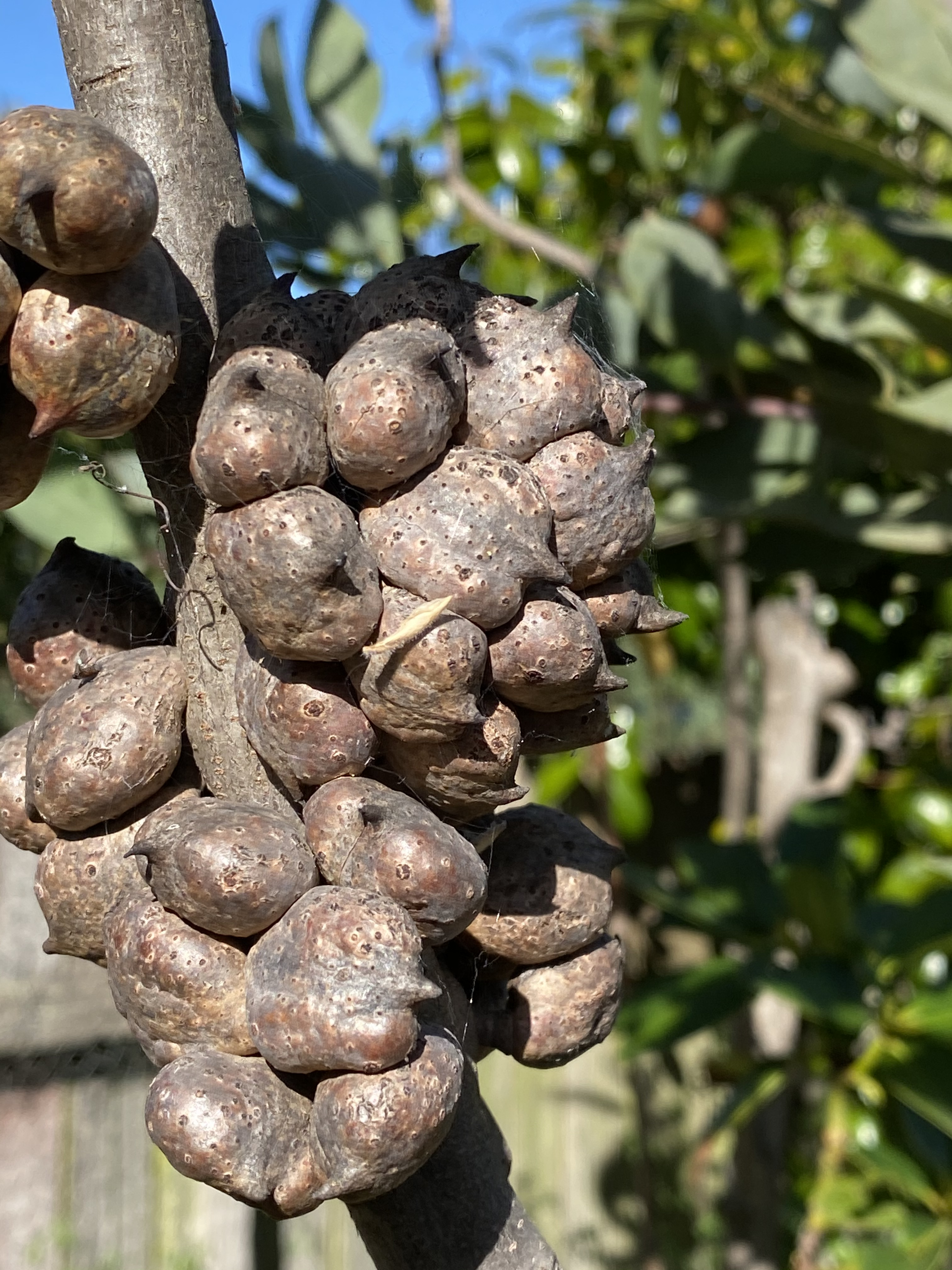
Fruit

Hakea petiolaris, commonly known as the sea-urchin hakea, is a shrub or small tree with cream-coloured and pink or purple flowers and woody fruit. It is endemic to the south west of Australia, occurring at the coastal plain, jarrah forest and wheatbelt regions, often at the ancient granite outcrops of Western Australia.

== Description ==
Hakea petiolaris grows as an erect shrub or tree up to 9 m (30 ft) in height. The leaves have a distinctive pale-grey colour and are 5.5–15 cm (2–6 in) long and 2.5–6 cm (1–2 in) wide. The flowers are arranged in groups that appear on small branches or in the forks of branches. The groups are roughly spherical and contain 120 to 200 individual flowers. Each flower is 1.4–1.8 cm (0.6–0.7 in) long and white or cream in colour with the perianth (the non-reproductive part of the flower) ranging in colour from pink to purple. Flowering is followed by woody seed capsules which are 2–3.5 cm (0.8–1 in) long and 1–2 cm (0.4–0.8 in) wide. Each capsule splits into valves and releases 2 dark brown or black winged seeds.

== Taxonomy ==
Hakea petiolaris was first described by Carl Meissner in 1845, using a collection made at York by Ludwig Preiss. The specific epithet (petiolaris) is derived from the Latin word petiolus meaning "small, slender stalk". The Latin epithet petiolaris refers to the leaves presentation on conspicuous stalks.

There are three subspecies, differing in the sizes of their leaves and the colour of the perianth as it ages.

- Hakea petiolaris Meisn. subsp. petiolaris has flowers that darken to mauve and then pink and has smaller leaves than those of the other subspecies. It is a shrub or small tree, one to two metres high, possesses a lignotuber and flowers in June.
- Hakea petiolaris subsp. trichophylla Haegi flowers darken to mauve and then maroon. It is a large shrub or tree, greater than three metres in height and sometimes attaining nine metres. It releases seed stored in its capsules rather than regenerating from a lignotuber in response to fire and flowers from April to June. The hairs on the leaves, that shine grey-green during flowering, are persistent; this is referred to in the epithet trichophylla, that is derived, according to Haegi from the Greek trichos (θρίξ, gen. τριχός; 'hair') and phyllon (φύλλον; 'leaf').
- Hakea petiolaris subsp. angusta Haegi which has flowers that darken to mauve and then pinkish mauve. A shrub or small tree, 1–2 m high, it flowers from March to May. The epithet angusta is a Latin word meaning "narrow".

== Distribution and habitat ==
- Subspecies petiolaris grows in jarrah forest, usually near granite outcrops between the Darling Range and York in the Avon Wheatbelt, Jarrah Forest and Swan Coastal Plain biogeographic regions.
- Subspecies trichophylla grows near granite outcrops in shrubland near Wongan Hills and with disjunct populations near Kununoppin and Tuttanning Nature Reserve east of Pingelly in the Avon Wheatbelt, Jarrah Forest and Mallee biogeographic regions.
- Subspecies angusta is only known from a few small populations growing around granite outcrops near Pingaring in the Mallee biogeographic region.

== Conservation ==
All three subspecies of H. petiolaris are listed as "not threatened" by the Western Australian Government Department of Parks and Wildlife.

== Cultivation ==
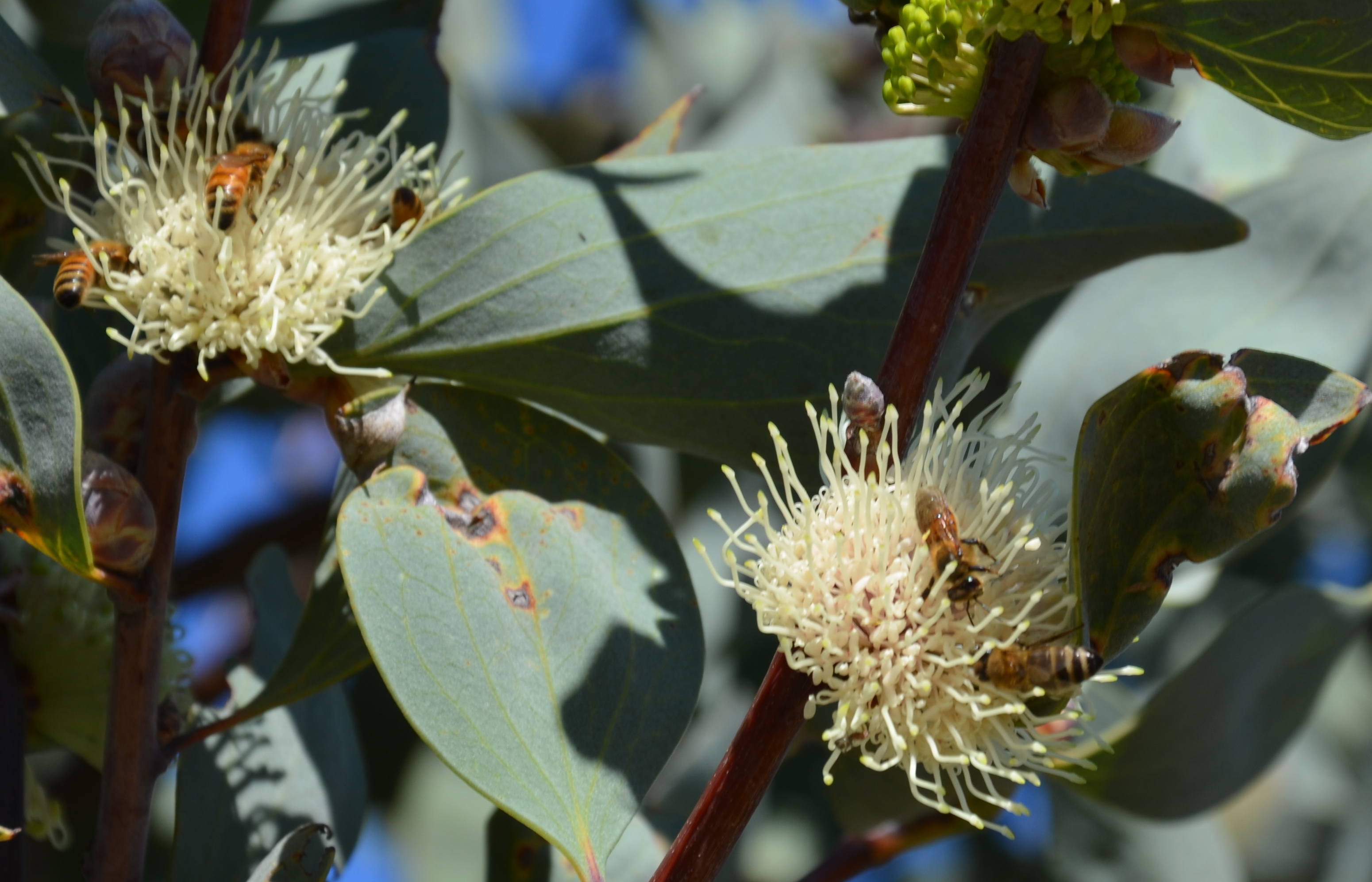
Bees in Hakaea petiolaris flowers, cultivars in Swan Valley, Western Australia

The species is propagated from seed, establishing itself as a large shrub, or a tree to around ten metres, the width is around two metres. The horticultural applications include use as a screening plant or hedge, or displayed as individual specimens. It is a fast growing and hardy species, frost resistant, bird attracting and has good potential as a feature plant.

Hakea petiolaris is recommended for the attractive appearance of its flowers and attraction for birds. Clusters of dullish red flowers, contrasted by white styles, are presented at the leaf axis in the austral autumn or winter. The plant is successfully grown in the urbanised sub-coastal regions of southern Australia.

The most common subspecies in cultivation is H. petiolaris subsp. trichophylla.

== Ecology ==
The presentation of flowers at the stem (cauliflory) may be a relictual characteristic of a time when tall forest dominated the region and pollinators such as birds moved within the dense leaf canopy of under-storey species.
