= Maddington, Western Australia =

Maddington
- Suburb
- Interactive map of Maddington
- Coordinates: 32.049°S 115.990°E
- Country: Australia
- State: Western Australia
- City: Perth
- LGA: City of Gosnells
- Location: 20 km (12 mi) SE of Perth

Government
  - State electorates: Forrestfield; Thornlie
  - Federal division: Burt

Area
  - Total: 10.7 km^{2} (4.1 sq mi)

Population
  - Total: 12,419 (SAL 2021)
- Postcode: 6109
Suburbs around Maddington
Kenwick	Wattle Grove, Orange Grove	Orange Grove
Kenwick, Thornlie	Maddington	Orange Grove
Thornlie	Gosnells	Martin

Maddington is a suburb 20 kilometres (12 mi) southeast of the central business district of Perth, the capital of Western Australia, within the City of Gosnells local government area. Maddington is a mixed-use suburb containing major residential, retail and industrial sections as well as some semi-rural areas.

Unusual amongst the surrounding suburbs Maddington still retains several vineyards and orchards from when the locality was used for agricultural purposes. Maddington has a railway station and like numerous other centres, has been engaging in transit-oriented development planning.

== History ==
During the 19th century, Maddington was owned by John Randall Phillips, one of the wealthier colonists to arrive in Perth during the 1830s. Maddington Park, which Phillips named after a town in Wiltshire, England, was subdivided 70 years later as Perth dealt with the population explosion following the gold rush. Maddington Park became "Maddington" – an area of varied agricultural uses including market gardens, poultry and orchards. In the 1950s and 1960s, Maddington and surrounding suburbs were further subdivided and developed into residential suburbs.

During the 1960s the Canning Park race course, located in Maddington, was abandoned. William Davison, an English property developer bought up the land and developed the area into an industrial estate, a light industrial area that can be seen along Albany Highway and the train line today. The suburb also was the site of one of 24 new Australian Technical Colleges proposed by the Howard government in 2005.

== Maddington Central ==
Formerly known as Centro Maddington and Maddington Metro, the centre was built in two stages from the early 1980s to 1992. Main tenants include Coles, Woolworths, Kmart and Best & Less. Other stores include ANZ Bank, Red Dot stores, National Australia Bank, Telstra, numerous small shops in the food court and the Maddington post office.

Maddington Central is located 20 kilometres from the Perth central business district between Olga Road, Burslem Drive and Attfield Street in Maddington. It is also accessible by public transport.

== Transport ==
=== Bus ===
- 204 and 205 Maddington Station to Murdoch University – serve Kelvin Road, Attfield Street and Burslem Drive
- 220 Perth Busport to Armadale Station – serves Albany Highway and Maddington Station
- 221 Perth Busport to Armadale Station (limited stops) – serves Albany Highway and Maddington Station
- 228 Gosnells Station to Thornlie Station – serves Gosnells Road, Westfield Street, Kelvin Road, Maddington Station, Attfield Street and Burslem Drive
- 229 Maddington Central to Westfield Carousel – serves Attfield Street, Kelvin Road, Maddington Station, Alcock Street, Dellar Road, Maddington Road, Eva Street, Emerald Road and Bickley Road
- 279 Maddington Central to Kalamunda Bus Station – serves Attfield Street, Kelvin Road and Maddington Station
- 907 Perth Busport to Armadale Station (high frequency / limited stops) – serves Albany Highway and Maddington Station

=== Rail ===
- Armadale Line
  - Maddington Station

== Gallery ==
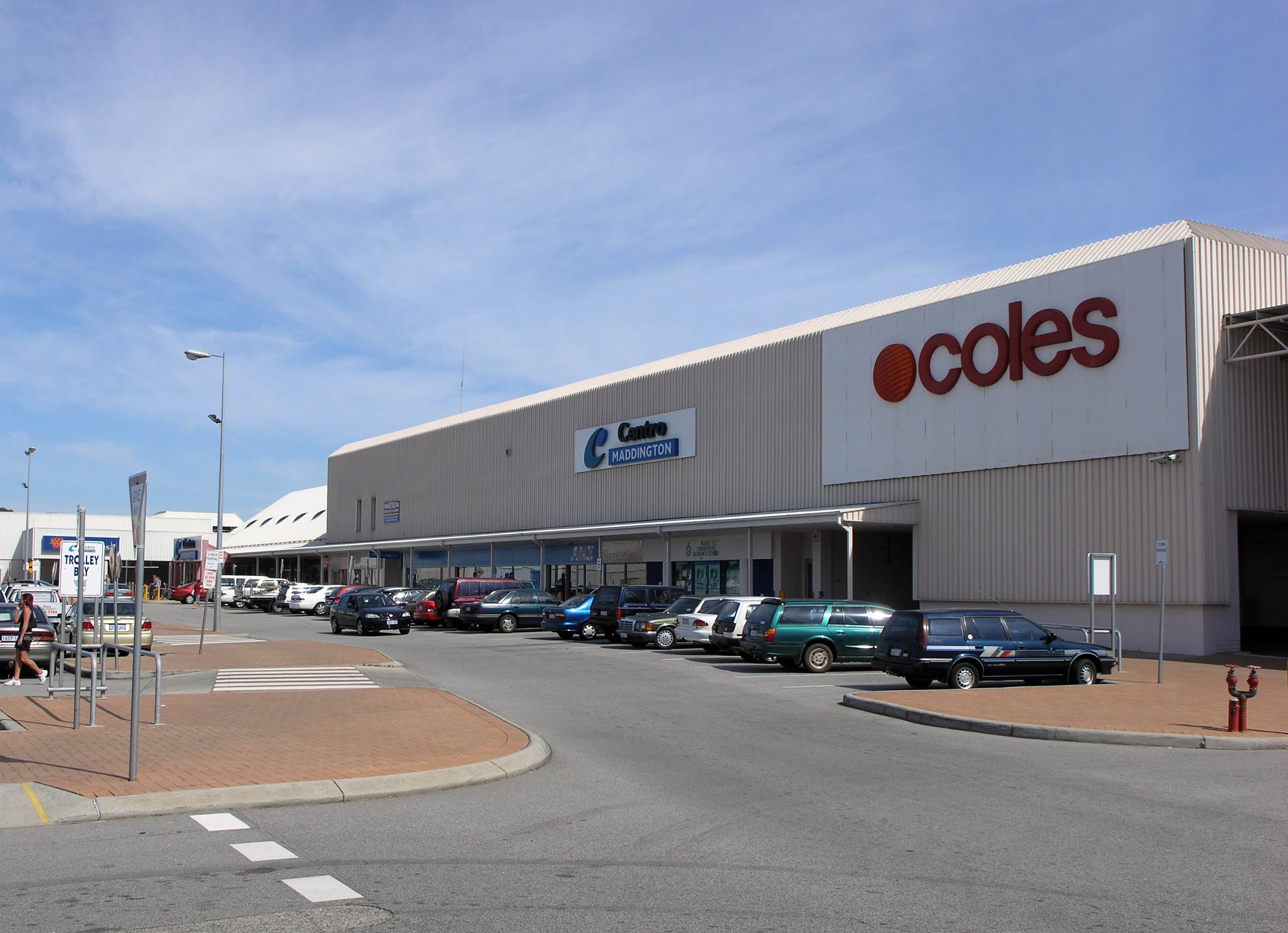
Maddington shopping centre
