= Kenwick, Western Australia =

Kenwick
- Suburb
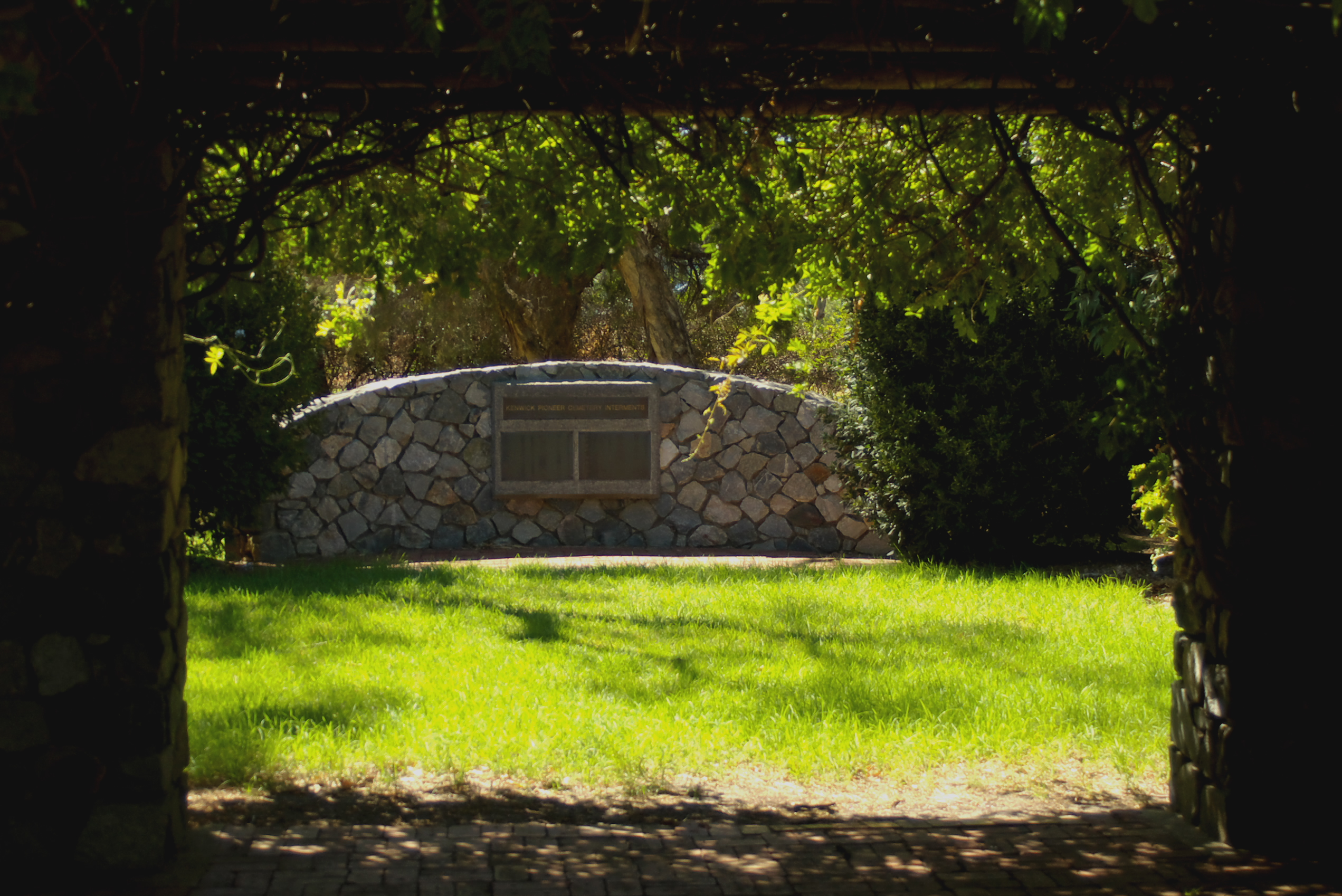
- Memorial at Kenwick Pioneer Cemetery
- Interactive map of Kenwick
- Coordinates: 32.029°S 115.982°E
- Country: Australia
- State: Western Australia
- City: Perth
- LGA: City of Gosnells
- Location: 18 km (11 mi) from Perth, Western Australia

Government
  - State electorate: Cannington
  - Federal division: Burt

Area
  - Total: 9.8 km^{2} (3.8 sq mi)

Population
  - Total: 5,684 (SAL 2021)
- Postcode: 6107
Suburbs around Kenwick
Beckenham	Wattle Grove	Wattle Grove
Cannington	Kenwick	Orange Grove
Langford	Maddington	Maddington

Kenwick is a mixed residential, light industrial and semi-rural suburb located in the south-east of Perth, Western Australia, located within the City of Gosnells. A large portion of the suburb is composed of remnant agricultural land organised as smallholdings of several acres, as well as relatively pristine native wetlands, including the Brixton Street Wetlands which are of significant conservation value. It also contains several sites of historical significance relating to its status as one of the early farming communities of the Swan River Colony.

Kenwick is bounded on the south-west by the Canning River and on the north-west by the Roe Highway. Albany Highway, the main south-east arterial transport route, runs through the western part of the suburb.

== Amenities ==
=== Historic sites ===
- Kenwick Pioneer Cemetery
- Liddelow Homestead

=== Commercial and retail ===
Kenwick contains a small local shopping centre in the main residential area, a mixed retail and commercial centre at the major highway intersection adjacent to the railway station, and numerous light industrial businesses located along Albany Highway.

=== Sporting and community ===
Lawn bowls, tennis courts, a skate park, a library and community centre, and an oval for cricket and football are all available for community usage. A significant sporting complex incorporating most of these activities is located at Mills Park in the north-west of the suburb.

=== Schools ===
- East Kenwick Primary School
- Kenwick School
- Rehoboth Christian College

== Transport ==
=== Bus ===
- 220 Perth Busport to Armadale Station – serves Albany Highway and Kenwick Station
- 229 Westfield Carousel to Maddington Central – serves Brixton Street, Wanaping Road and Kenwick Road

=== Rail ===
- Armadale Line
  - Kenwick Station

== See also ==
Kenwick railway station
