= Challis railway station =

Railway station in Perth, Western Australia

Challis
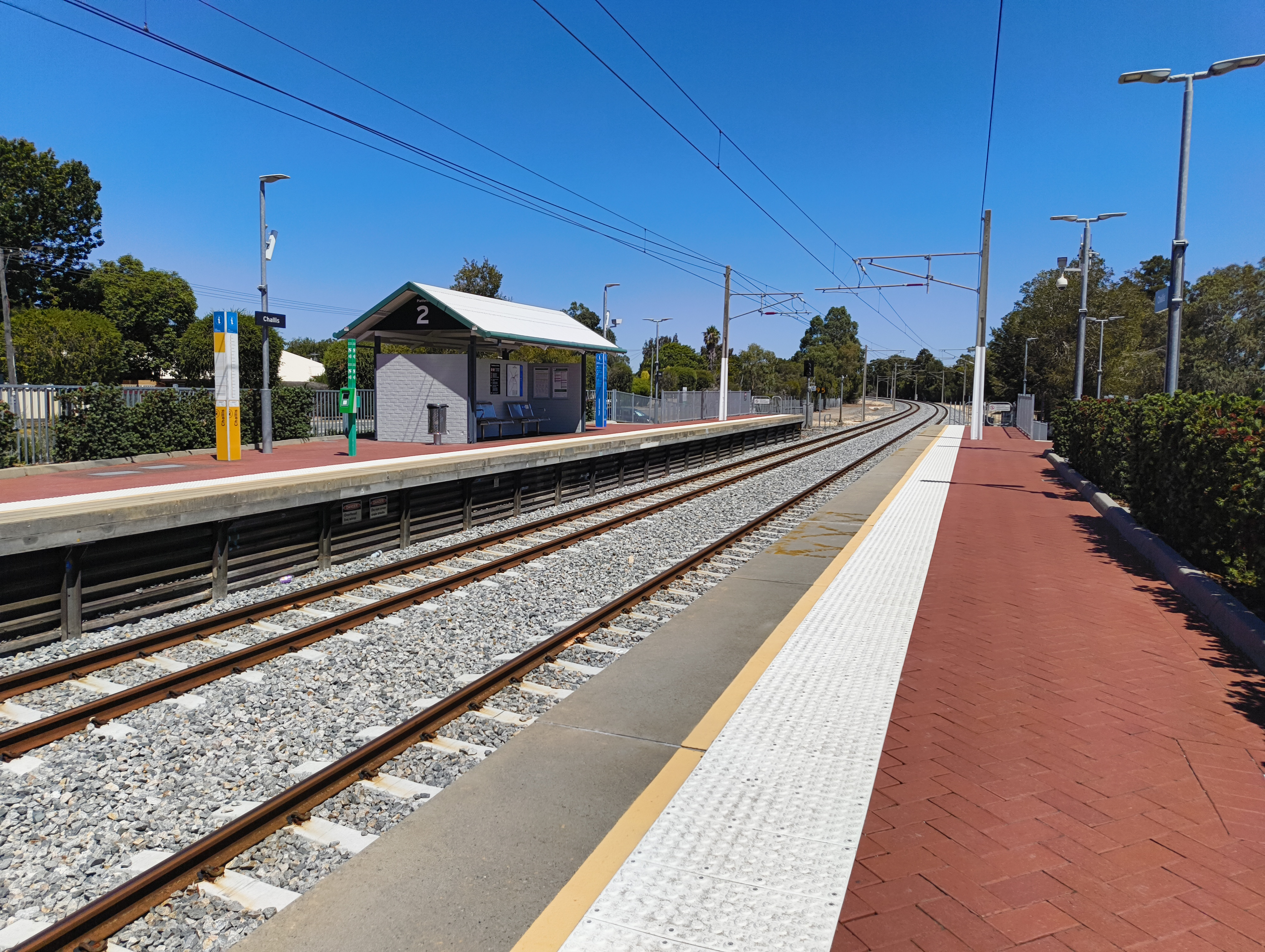
- View of both platforms, including the shelter on Platform 2, in March 2026

General information
- Location: Railway Avenue & Streich Avenue, Kelmscott, Western Australia; Australia
- Coordinates: 32°07′36″S 116°00′46″E
- Owner: Public Transport Authority
- Operator: Transperth Train Operations
- Line: South Western Railway
- Distance: 27.3 kilometres (17.0 mi) from Perth
- Platforms: 2 side platforms
- Tracks: 2

Construction
- Structure type: Ground
- Accessible: Partial

Other information
- Fare zone: 3

History
- Opened: 29 October 1973

Passengers
- 2017: 259 daily

Services
Preceding station	Transperth	Following station
Kelmscott towards Perth	Armadale line	Sherwood towards Byford
Location
- Location of Challis railway station

Challis railway station is a suburban railway station in Kelmscott, a suburb of Perth, Western Australia. It is on the Armadale line which is part of the Transperth network, and is 27.3 kilometres (17.0 mi) southwest of Perth station and 3.1 kilometres (1.9 mi) north of Armadale station. The station opened on 29 October 1973, as did the adjacent Sherwood station, filling the large gap between Armadale station and Kelmscott station. It consists of two side platforms with a pedestrian level crossing. It is not fully accessible due to steep ramps and wide gaps at the pedestrian level crossing.

Services are operated by Transperth Train Operations, a division of the state government's Public Transport Authority. Peak services reach seven trains per hour in each direction, whilst off-peak services are four trains per hour. The station is one of the least used ones on the Transperth network, with just 259 boardings per day in October 2017. The City of Armadale rezoned nearby land in the 2010s with the goal of increasing patronage.

== Description ==
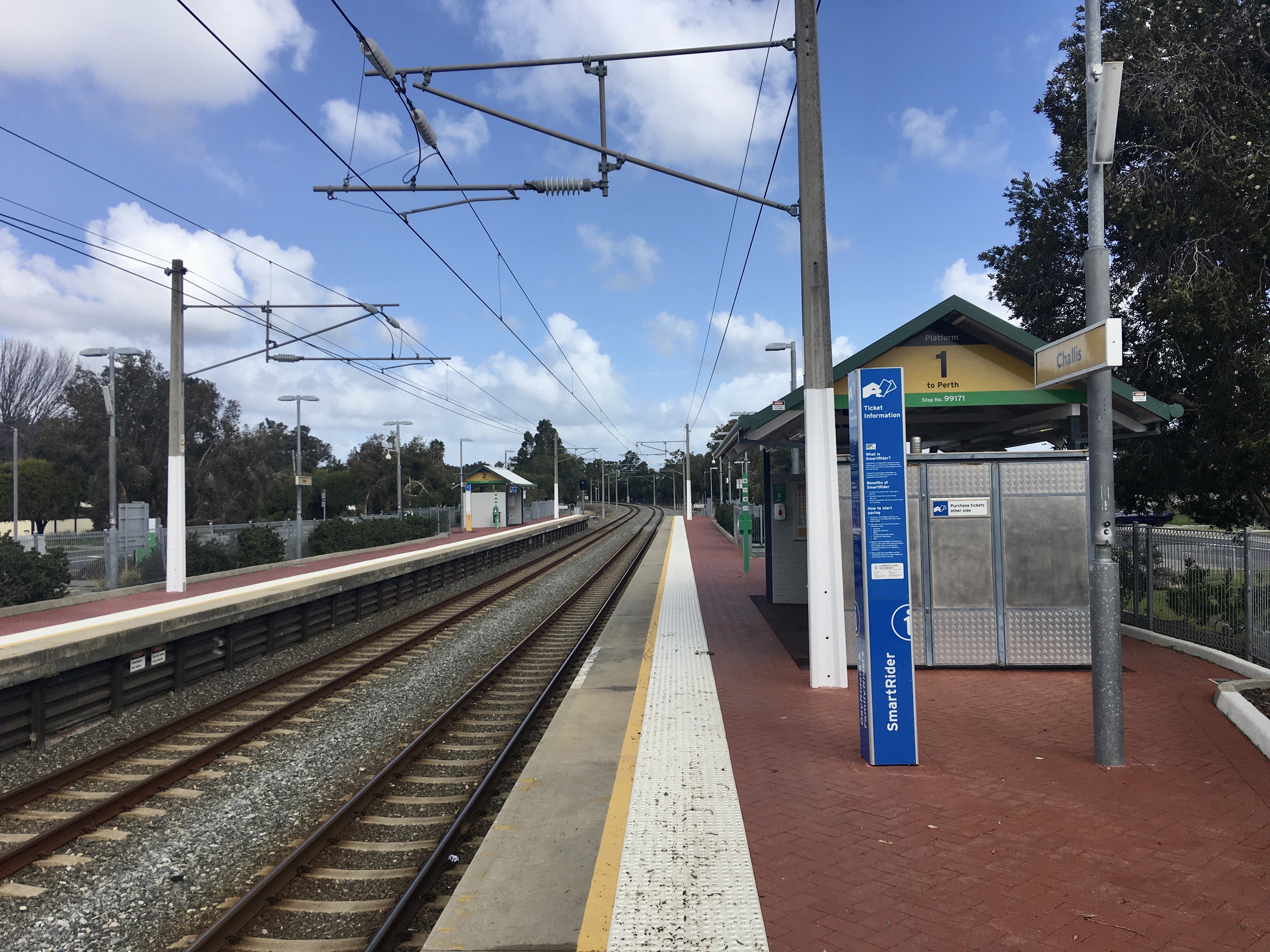
Challis station platforms in August 2022

Challis station is on the South Western Railway, which links Perth to Bunbury. The northern 30.4 kilometres (18.9 mi) of this railway, between Perth and Armadale, is used by Armadale line suburban rail services as part of the Transperth network. The line and the station are owned by the Public Transport Authority (PTA), an agency of the Government of Western Australia. (Note: The PTA succeeded the Western Australian Government Railways as the owner and operator of the rail network in 2003.) Challis station is located between Kelmscott station to the north and Sherwood station to the south, within the suburb of Kelmscott, Western Australia. The station is between Streich Avenue to the east and Railway Avenue to the west, 27.3 kilometres (17.0 mi), or a 30-minute train journey, (Note: 30-minute train journey on a "C" pattern service, the most common service. 34-minute train journey on an all stops service.) from Perth station, and 3.1 kilometres (1.9 mi), or a 5-minute train journey, from Armadale station. This places the station in Transperth fare zone three.

Challis station consists of two side platforms which are approximately 100 metres (330 ft) long, enough for a four-car train but not a six-car train. Eventually, as part of the PTA's efforts to make all stations compatible with six-car trains, the platform will be lengthened to 150 metres (490 ft). The only way to cross the tracks is at a pedestrian level crossing at the northern end of the station. Two car parks with 32 bays in total are on either side of the station, and there are bike racks as well. Challis station is not fully accessible due to the ramps to the platforms being too steep and the pedestrian crossing containing large gaps.

== History ==
With the 1970 Corridor Plan for Perth, new areas between Armadale and Kelmscott were opened up for development. The Armadale–Kelmscott Shire Council began lobbying the state government for new stations within the large gap between Armadale and Kelmscott stations. Plans were completed by May 1973 for two new stations, with construction commencing soon afterwards. Originally planned to open on 20 October 1973, Challis station opened on 29 October, as did the adjacent Sherwood station (then known as Kingsley station). The shire council wanted the station to be named "Streich" after a well known local doctor, but the Western Australian Government Railways decided on "Challis", which came from the nearby Challis Primary School. The school was named after Challis Road, which was named after a family who had established an orchard in the area in the 1910s.

Shelters were added in 1982–83. The City of Armadale rezoned nearby land for higher densities in the late 2010s, with the goal of increasing patronage.

The station closed on 20 November 2023 for an 18 month shutdown to facilitate works on the Victoria Park-Canning Level Crossing Removal and Byford Rail Extension projects as part of Metronet. The station reopened on 12 October 2025 with the extension to Byford.

== Services ==
=== Train services ===
Challis station is served by Armadale line services operated by Transperth Train Operations, a division of the PTA. Trains run between Perth and Byford every 7.5 minutes on peak, every 15 minutes off peak and every 30 minutes at night, stopping all stations.

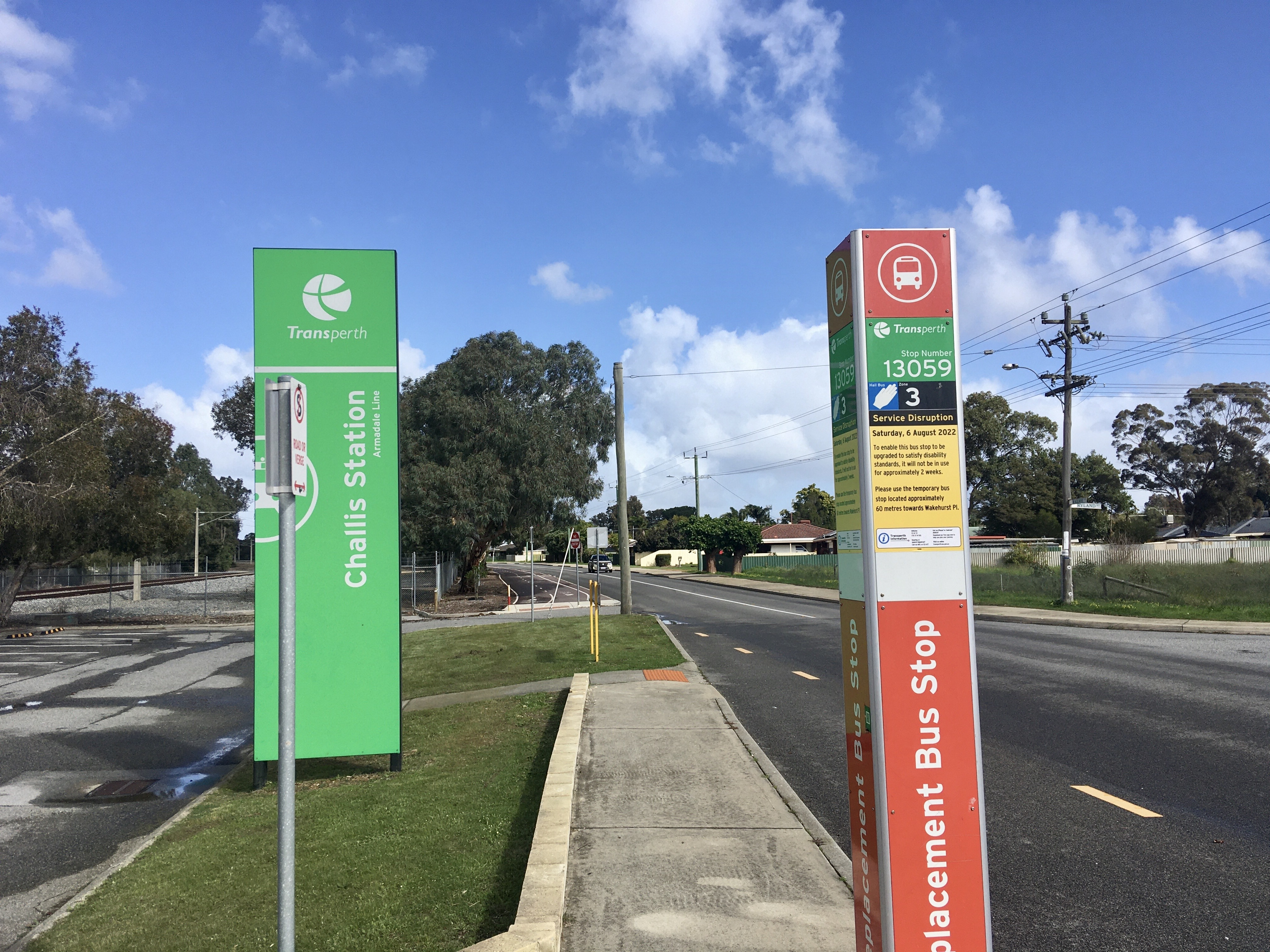
Rail replacement bus stop at Challis station in August 2022

Before the shutdown, Armadale line services reached seven trains per hour during peak, dropping to four trains per hour between peaks. At night, there were two trains per hour, dropping to one train per hour in the early hours of the morning. Apart from at night and on Sundays/public holidays, most train services followed the "C" stopping pattern, which skipped Burswood, Victoria Park, Carlisle, Welshpool and Queens Park stations. There were also two "B" stopping pattern services which ran southbound during the afternoon, stopping the same as the "C" pattern with the addition of Queens Park. Starting at night, trains stopped at all stations. On Sundays and public holidays, half of all trains were "C" pattern trains and half all stops trains.

In the 2013–14 financial year, Challis station had 73,805 boardings, making it the second least used station on the Armadale and Thornlie lines behind Seaforth station. (Note: Aside from Belmont Park station, which closed on 13 October 2013 and only operated during certain events.) On an average weekday in October 2017, the station had 259 boardings, making it the third least used Transperth station behind Seaforth station (136) and Success Hill station (139). The weekend average number of boardings was 209 in October 2018, the third lowest after Success Hill (124) and Seaforth (170).

==== Platforms ====
Challis platform arrangement
Stop ID	Platform	Line	Destination	Via	Stopping Pattern	Notes
99171	1	Armadale line	Perth		All stations	
99172	2	Armadale line	Byford		All stations	

=== Bus routes ===
On Railway Avenue is a pair of bus stops for route 907, the rail replacement bus service.
