= Sherwood railway station, Perth =

Railway station in Perth, Western Australia

Sherwood
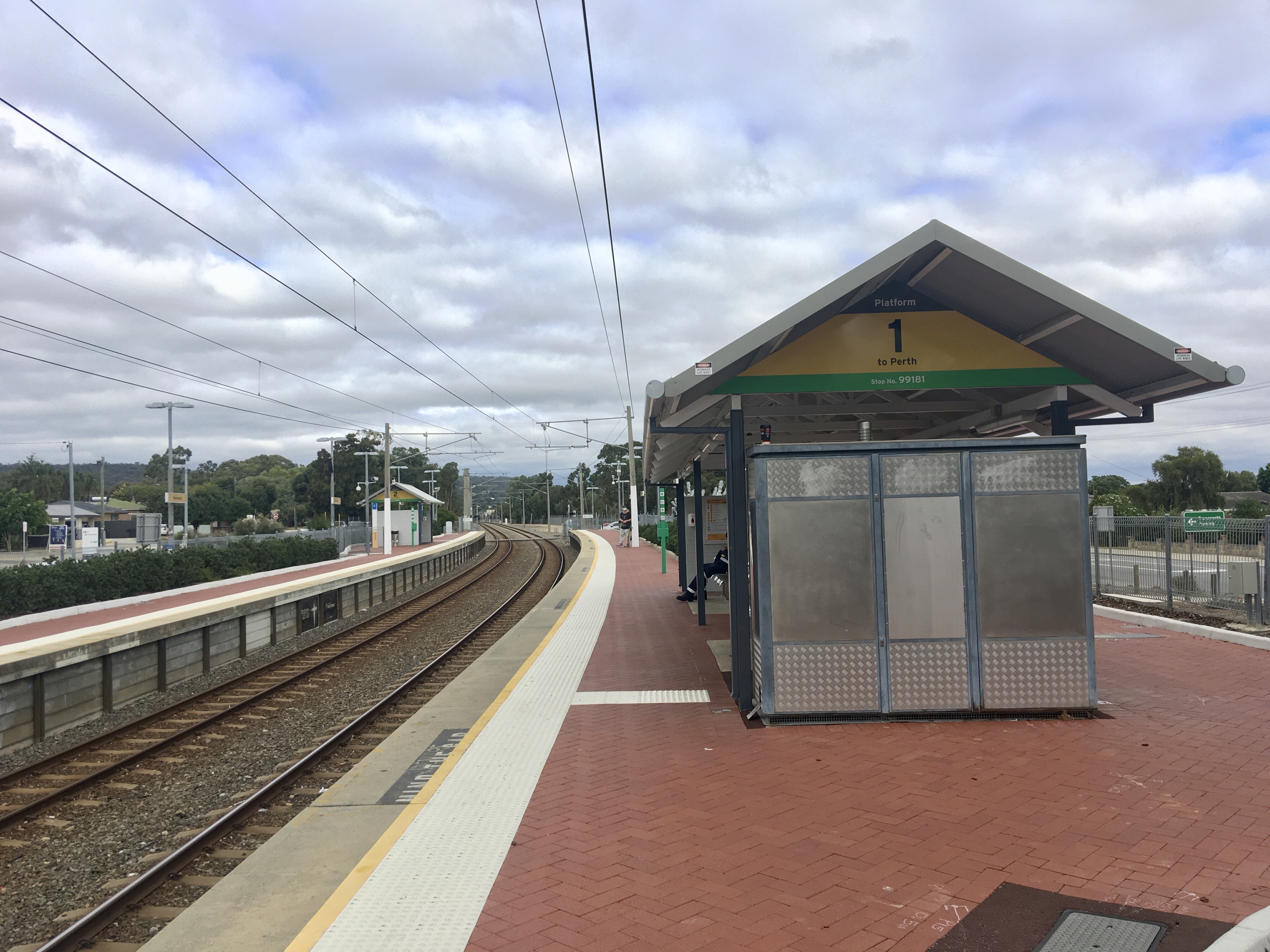
- Southbound view from Platform 1, April 2022

General information
- Location: Railway Avenue & Streich Avenue, Armadale, Western Australia; Australia
- Coordinates: 32°08′16″S 116°00′39″E
- Owner: Public Transport Authority
- Operator: Transperth Train Operations
- Line: South Western Railway
- Distance: 28.6 kilometres (17.8 mi) from Perth
- Platforms: 2 side platforms
- Tracks: 2

Construction
- Structure type: Ground
- Accessible: Partial

Other information
- Fare zone: 3

History
- Opened: 1973

Passengers
- 2013–14: 136,158

Services
Preceding station	Transperth	Following station
Challis towards Perth	Armadale line	Armadale towards Byford
Location
- Location of Sherwood railway station

Sherwood railway station is a suburban railway station in Armadale, a suburb of Perth, Western Australia. It is on the Armadale line which is part of the Transperth network, and is 28.6 kilometres (17.8 mi) southwest of Perth station and 1.8 kilometres (1.1 mi) north of Armadale station. The station opened in 1973 as Kingsley, but was renamed to Sherwood in 1989. It consists of two side platforms with a pedestrian level crossing. It is not fully accessible due to steep ramps, wide gaps at the pedestrian level crossing, and wide gaps between the platform and train. Services are operated by Transperth Train Operations, a division of the state government's Public Transport Authority. The station was temporarily closed for 18 months from November 2023 to allow upgrade works on the Armadale Line to take place. It reopened in October 2025.

== Description ==
Sherwood station is along the South Western Railway, which links Perth to Bunbury. The northern 30.4 kilometres (18.9 mi) of this railway, between Perth and Armadale, is used by Armadale line suburban rail services as part of the Transperth network. The line and the station are owned by the Public Transport Authority (PTA), an agency of the Government of Western Australia. Sherwood station is located between Challis station to the north and Armadale station to the south, within the suburb of Armadale. The station is between Streich Avenue to the east and Railway Avenue to the west, 28.6 kilometres (17.8 mi), or a 32-minute train journey, (Note: 32-minute train journey on a "C" pattern service, the most common service. 36-minute train journey on an all stops service.) from Perth station, and 1.8 kilometres (1.1 mi), or a 3-minute train journey, from Armadale station. This places the station in Transperth fare zone three.

Sherwood station consists of two side platforms which are approximately 100 metres (330 ft) long, enough for a four-car train but not a six-car train. The only way to cross the tracks is at a pedestrian level crossing at the southern end of the station. There is a car park on both sides of the station, with a total of 47 bays. Sherwood station is not fully accessible due to the ramps to the platforms being too steep, the pedestrian crossing containing 75-millimetre (3.0 in) gaps, and the platform gap being as much as 130 millimetres (5.1 in).

== History ==
With the 1970 Corridor Plan for Perth, new areas between Armadale and Kelmscott were opened up for development. The Armadale–Kelmscott Shire Council began lobbying the state government for new stations within the large gap between Armadale and Kelmscott stations. Plans were completed by May 1973 for two new stations, with construction commencing soon afterwards. Sherwood station opened later that year, as did the adjacent Challis station. Sherwood was originally named Kingsley station after the nearby Kingsley Primary School. It was renamed on 27 July 1989 to avoid confusion with Kingsley in the northern suburbs of Perth. The name "Sherwood" comes from a nearby housing estate developed in the early 20th century. In 1982–83, shelters were built at the station. On 20 November 2023, the station closed for 18 months to allow work on the Victoria Park-Canning Level Crossing Removal, Thornlie–Cockburn Link and Byford Rail Extension projects to take place. It reopened with the Byford extension on 12 October 2025.

== Services ==
Sherwood station was served by Armadale line services operated by Transperth Train Operations, a division of the PTA. Trains run between Perth and Byford every 7.5 minutes on peak, every 15 minutes off peak and every 30 minutes at night, stopping at all stations.

Before the shutdown began, Armadale line services reached seven trains per hour during peak, dropping to four trains per hour between peaks. At night, there were two trains per hour, dropping to one train per hour in the early hours of the morning. Apart from at night and on Sundays/public holidays, most train services followed the "C" stopping pattern, which skipped Burswood, Victoria Park, Carlisle, Welshpool and Queens Park stations. There were also two "B" stopping pattern services which ran during the afternoon Armadale-bound. Those services were the same as the "C" pattern except they stopped at Queens Park. Starting at night, trains stopped at all stations. On Sundays and public holidays, half of all trains were "C" pattern trains and half all stops trains.

On Railway Avenue are a pair of bus stops for rail replacement route 907, which operates a limited stop service between Perth Busport and Armadale when trains are not running.

In the 2013–14 financial year, Sherwood station had 136,158 boardings. The City of Armadale rezoned nearby land for higher densities in the late 2010s, with the goal of increasing patronage.

Sherwood platform arrangement
Stop ID	Platform	Line	Destination	Via	Stopping Pattern	Notes
99181	1	Armadale line	Perth		All stations	
99182	2	Armadale line	Byford		All stations	
