= Burswood railway station =

Railway station in Perth, Western Australia

Burswood
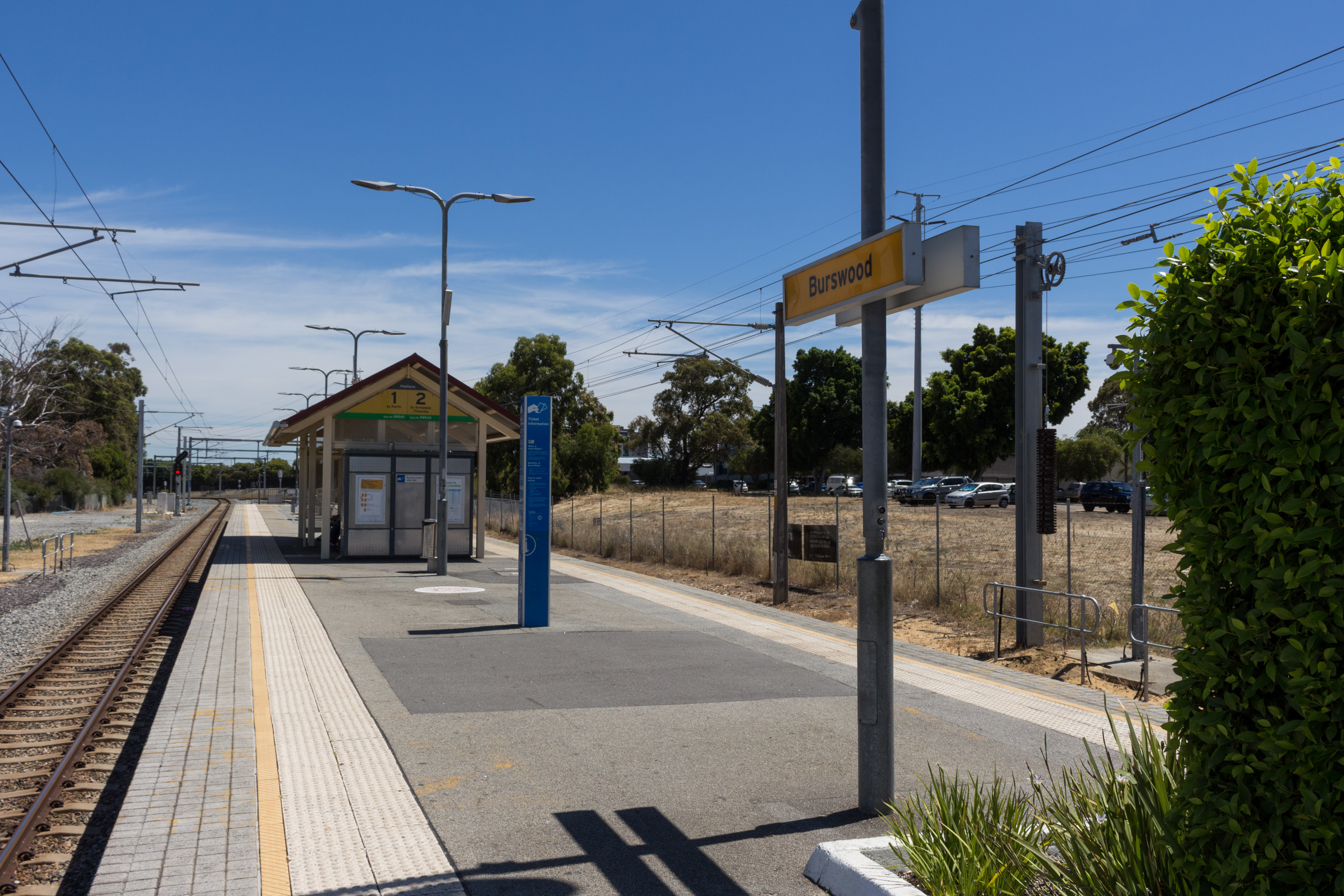
- Southbound view from Platform 2, December 2017

General information
- Location: Victoria Park Drive, Burswood; Australia
- Coordinates: 31°57′36″S 115°54′00″E
- Owner: Public Transport Authority
- Operator: Transperth
- Lines: Armadale line; Thornlie–Cockburn line
- Distance: 4.8 km (3 mi) from Perth
- Platforms: 2 (1 island)
- Tracks: 2

Construction
- Structure type: Ground
- Parking: Yes
- Cycle facilities: Yes
- Accessible: Yes

Other information
- Status: Unstaffed
- Station code: ABD; 99041 (platform 1); 99042 (platform 2)
- Fare zone: 1

History
- Opened: 1893
- Former names: Rivervale

Passengers
- 2013-L–14: 399,398

Services
Preceding station	Transperth	Following station
Perth Stadium towards Perth	Armadale line	Victoria Park towards Byford
Perth Stadium towards Perth	Thornlie–Cockburn line	Victoria Park towards Cockburn Central
Location
- Location of Burswood railway station

Burswood railway station is a railway station on the Transperth network. It is located on the Armadale line, 4.8 kilometres (3 mi) from Perth station serving the suburbs of Burswood, Lathlain and Rivervale.

== History ==
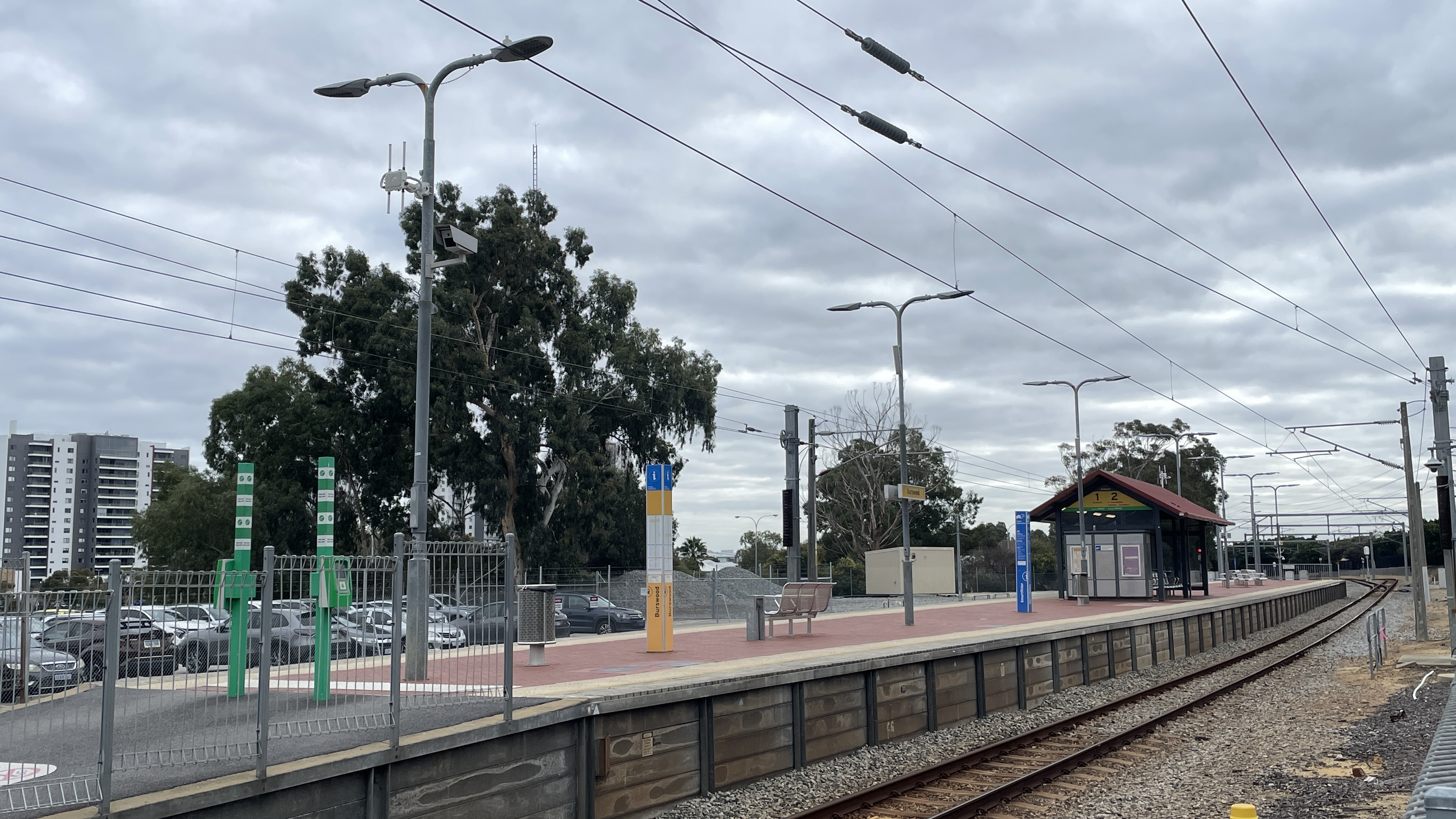
Platforms viewed from railway crossing

The station was originally to be named Burrswood, however it became Burswood after being misspelt by the station sign's painters when it opened in 1893. The station was renamed Rivervale on 30 May 1923, mirroring that of the suburb that was renamed in 1921 in part due to the public's association of Burswood with sewage processing; On 31 March 1968, a new platform opened.

However, after the Burswood Resort and Casino was built, the name reverted on 1 May 1994. Rivervale has survived as a suburb 600 metres (2,000 ft) east of the station.

== Station location ==
The station lies between Goodwood Parade and Victoria Park Drive. There are entrances to the station from either side of the tracks at the southern end of the platform, requiring passengers to cross the tracks at grade level.

== Services ==
Burswood railway station is served by Transperth Armadale and Thornlie-Cockburn line services.

The station saw 399,398 passengers in the 2013–14 financial year.

Platform 1 is used by services to Perth and Platform 2 is used by services to Byford and Cockburn Central.
