= Lathlain railway station =

Former railway station in Perth, Western Australia

Lathlain
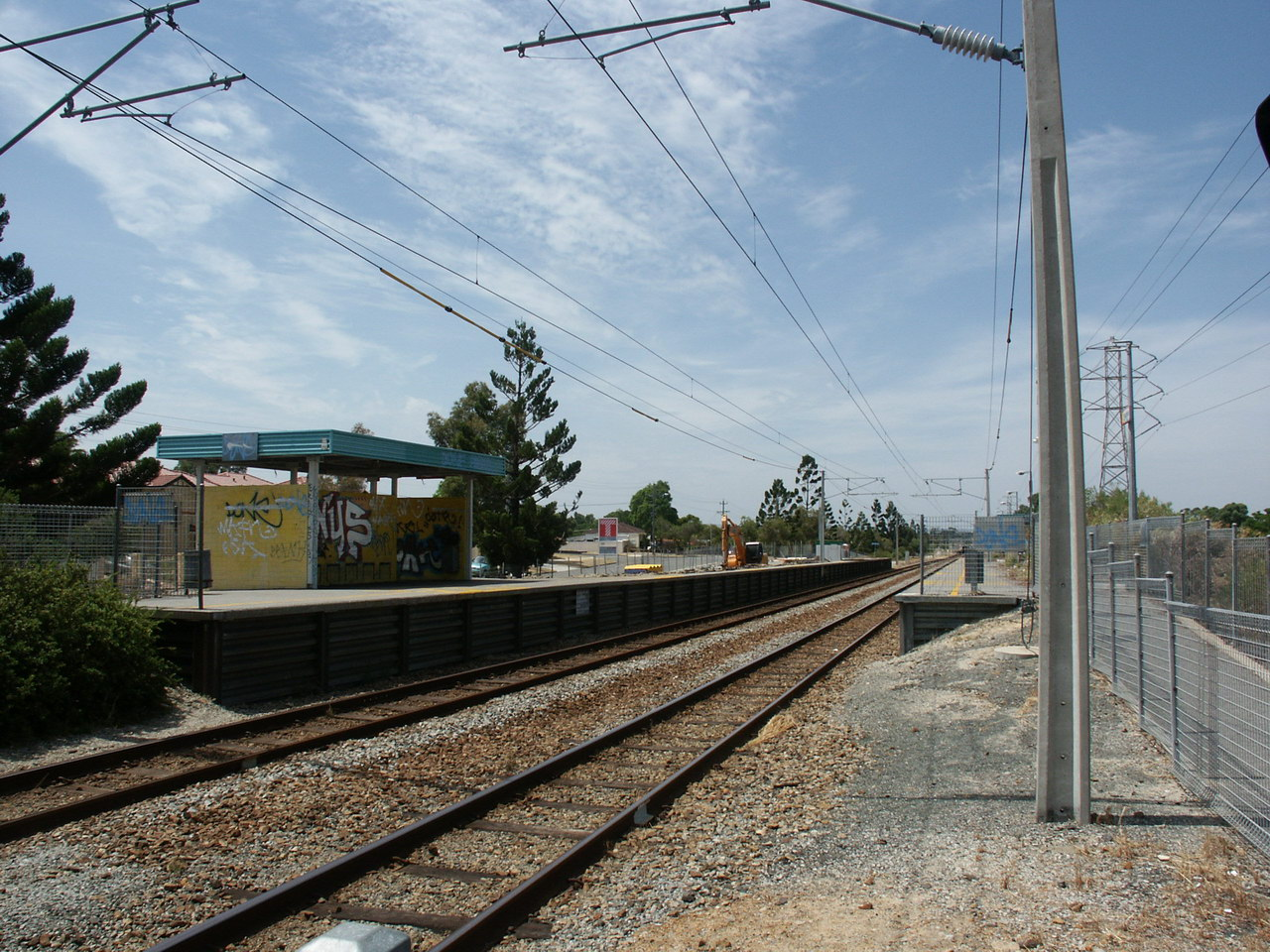
- Lathlain station after closure in February 2003

General information
- Location: Rutland Avenue, Lathlain / Victoria Park; Western Australia; Australia
- Coordinates: 31°58′32″S 115°54′21″E
- Owner: Public Transport Authority
- Operator: Western Australian Government Railways Commission
- Line: South Western Railway
- Distance: 6.5 kilometres (4.0 mi) from Perth
- Platforms: 2 side platforms
- Tracks: 2

Construction
- Accessible: No

Other information
- Status: Closed
- Fare zone: 1

History
- Opened: 2 May 1959
- Closed: 2 February 2003

Services
Preceding station	Transperth	Following station
Victoria Park towards Perth	Armadale line	Carlisle towards Armadale
Location
- Location of Lathlain station

Lathlain railway station was a suburban railway station on the Transperth network in Western Australia. It was on the Armadale line in the Perth suburbs of Lathlain and Victoria Park. The station opened on 2 May 1958 to serve Lathlain Park, the home ground of the Perth Football Club. The station closed on 2 February 2003 due to low patronage, its close distance to the adjacent Carlisle and Victoria Park stations, and the need to lower the railway line to build the Miller Street/Roberts Road bridge.

== History ==
Lathlain station opened on 2 May 1959 to serve Lathlain Park, an Australian rules football ground and home ground of the newly-relocated Perth Football Club. The station was in Victoria Park; Lathlain was not gazetted as an official place name until 1981. Lathlain station was closed on 8 October 1988 despite strong protest; it was reopened a month later on 7 November.

=== Closure ===
The original plans for the Mandurah line had it branch off the Armadale line at Kenwick. The South West Metropolitan Railway Master Plan, published in 2000, found that there were too many stations spaced closely together on the Armadale line between Perth and Kenwick. Lathlain station was 775 metres (2,543 ft) south of Victoria Park station and 580 metres (1,900 ft) north of Carlisle station. The master plan said that for Mandurah line services to integrate with Armadale line services, there would need to be fewer stations along the shared section of track and a change in the stopping patterns of Armadale line services. It was noted that patronage at Lathlain station was "extremely low for a heavy rail service. It was therefore decided to close Lathlain station, which would allow for the lowering of the tracks in the area for the replacement of the nearby Bishopsgate Street level crossing with a bridge across the railway at Miller Street/Roberts Road. Victoria Park station was also planned to be rebuilt 230 metres (750 ft) south of its existing location to make it closer to the former Lathlain station, among other reasons.

In 2001, a new state government was elected, who changed the route of the Mandurah line to be a more direct route from Perth rather than a branch of the Armadale line. Instead, the Thornlie line would be built as a one-station spur off the Armadale line at the same place as the previous Mandurah line route. A new master plan was released in August 2002. Although other planned upgrades to the Armadale line were cancelled, the Lathlain station closure, Victoria Park station rebuild, level crossing removal, and bridge construction were all planned to go ahead.

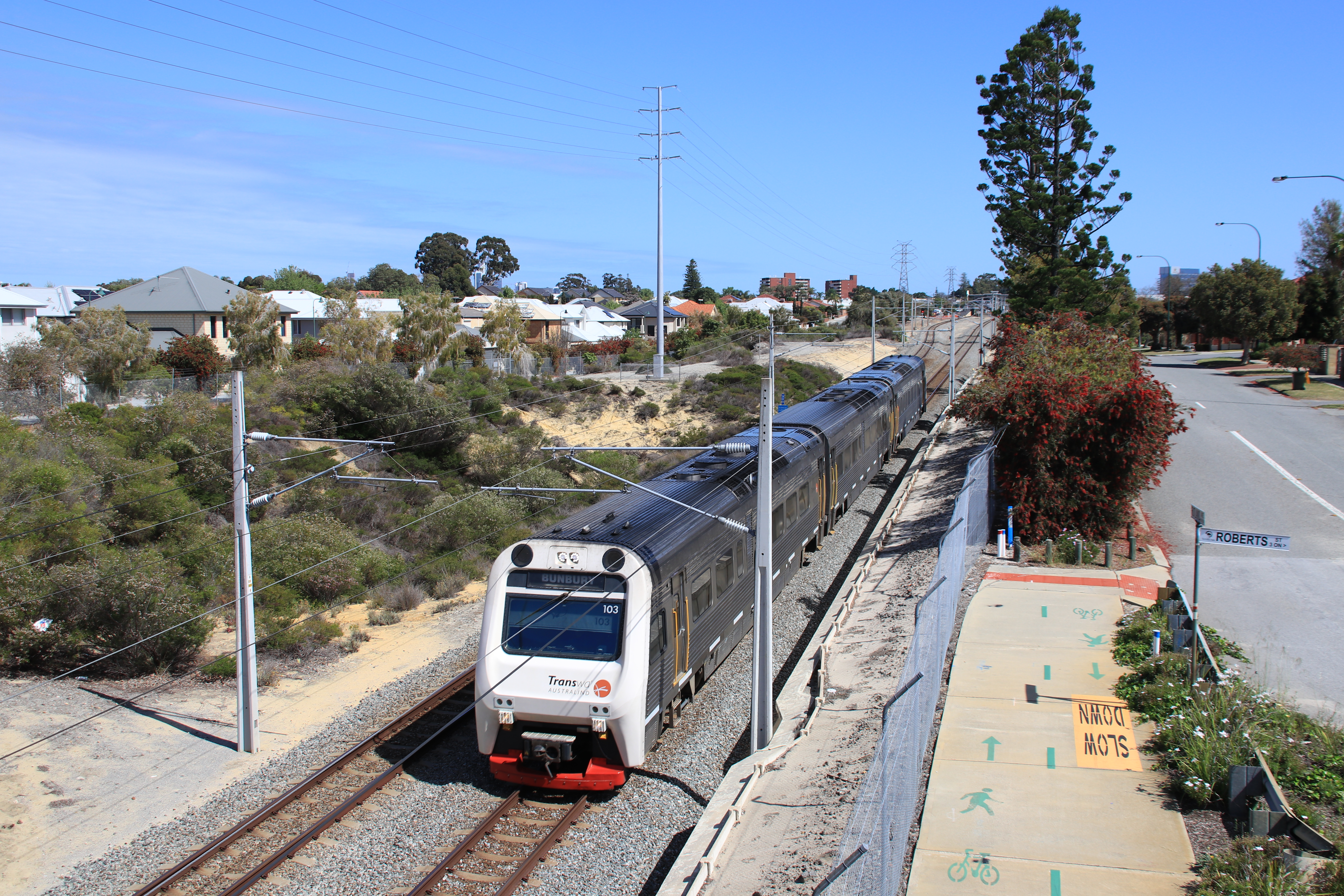
Australind ADP/ADQ diesel multiple unit passing the site of the former Lathlain station in October 2022 on a service from Perth to Bunbury. The southern (down) end of the Lathlain platform was at hard right on Rutland Ave in the distance at the intersection with Forster Ave.

Lathlain station had its last service on 2 February 2003, and it was demolished soon thereafter. The station was demolished with the illuminated station signs donated to the Perth Football Club.

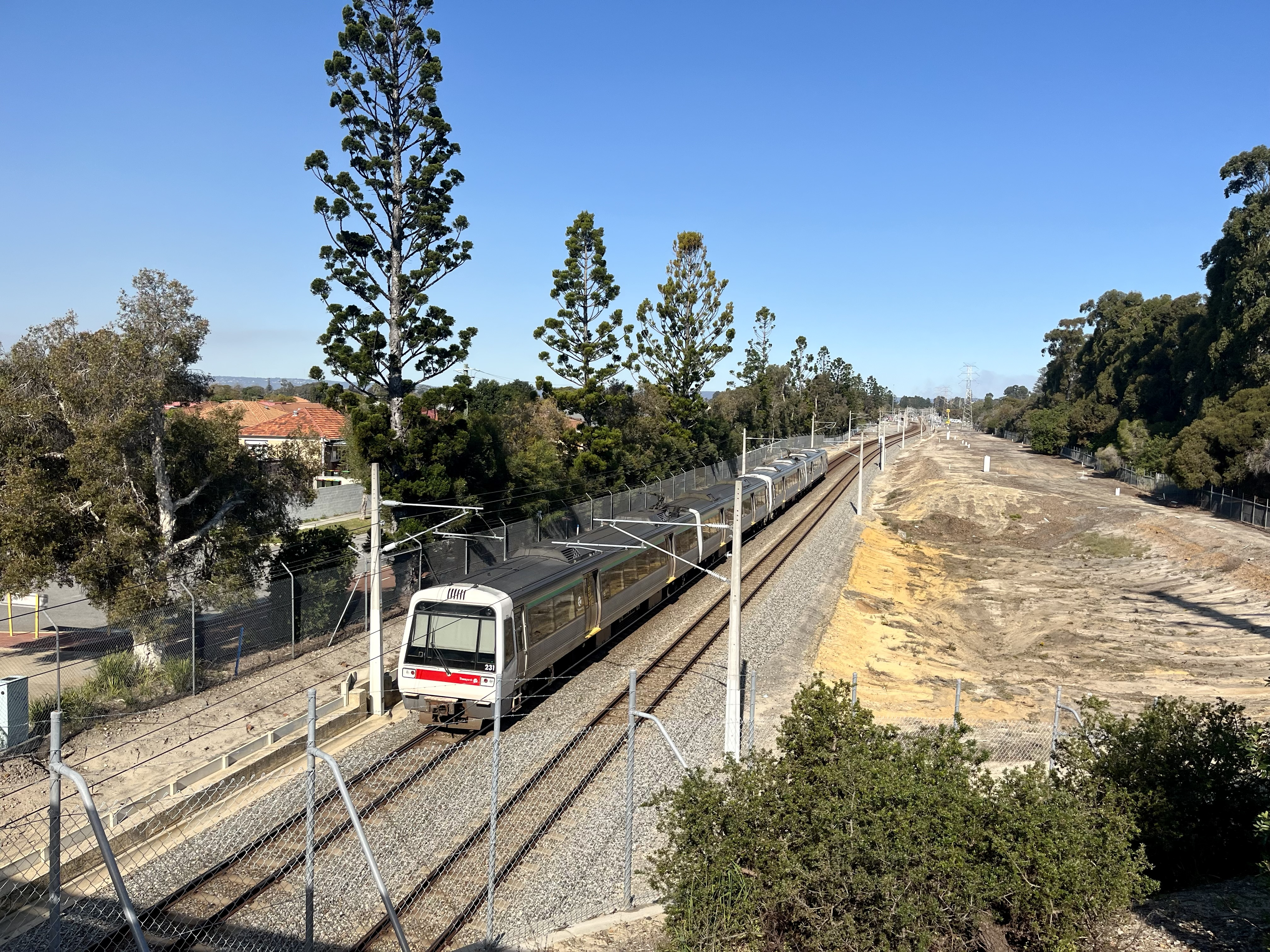
Southbound view from the Miller Street/Roberts Road bridge. The station was on the other, northern, side of this bridge, but this view shows the track deviation and lowering necessary to upgrade the line.

In September 2003, a contract worth $7.2 million was awarded to Works Infrastructure Pty Ltd for the deviation and lowering of tracks in the Victoria Park-Lathlain area, the construction of the Miller Street/Roberts Road bridge, and the construction of a pedestrian bridge at Howick Street. Two three-day shutdowns of the Armadale line occurred for the track realignment in January and March 2004. The Miller Street/Roberts Road bridge opened on 26 June 2004, after which the Bishopsgate Street level crossing closed. By that point, tenders for the construction of Victoria Park station had been delayed until the completion of the Mandurah line due to staff shortages in the construction industry. The new Victoria Park station eventually opened on 2 August 2008.

== Services ==
Lathlain station was served by Transperth's Armadale line services. At the time the station closed, they were operated by the Western Australian Government Railways Commission under an alliance agreement with the state's Department of Transport, later the Department for Planning and Infrastructure.
