= Rivervale, Western Australia =

Rivervale
- Suburb
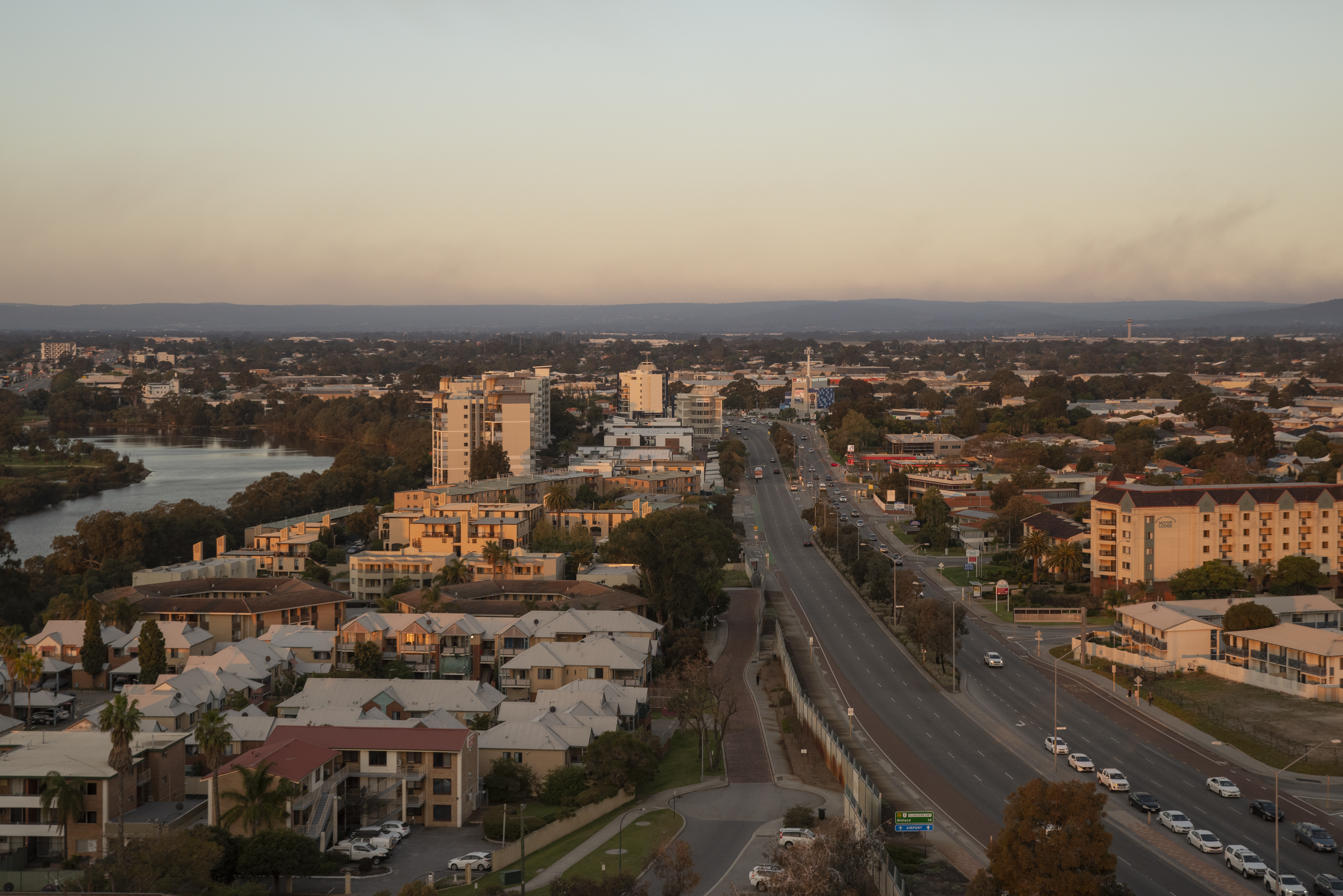
- Rivervale from the Aloft Hotel
- Interactive map of Rivervale
- Coordinates: 31.961°S 115.917°E
- Country: Australia
- State: Western Australia
- City: Perth
- LGA: City of Belmont
- Location: 5 km (3.1 mi) from Perth
- Established: 1843

Government
  - State electorate: Belmont
  - Federal division: Swan

Area
  - Total: 3.0 km^{2} (1.2 sq mi)

Population
  - Total: 10,897 (SAL 2021)
- Postcode: 6103
Suburbs around Rivervale
Burswood	Maylands	Belmont
Lathlain	Rivervale	Cloverdale
Carlisle	Carlisle	Kewdale

Rivervale is an inner eastern suburb of Perth, Western Australia. It is near the Swan River, 5 kilometres (3 mi) from the Perth central business district, and within the City of Belmont.

Rivervale was known as Barndon Hill until 1884.

== Transport ==
=== Bus ===
- 51 Perth Busport to Cannington Station – serves Orrong Road
- 270 Elizabeth Quay Bus Station to High Wycombe Station – serves Great Eastern Highway and Belmont Avenue
- 935 Kings Park to Redcliffe Station (high frequency) – serves Great Eastern Highway, Kooyong Road, Alexander Road and Belmont Avenue
- 940 Elizabeth Quay Bus Station to Redcliffe Station (high frequency) – serves Great Eastern Highway
