= Lathlain, Western Australia =

Lathlain
- Suburb
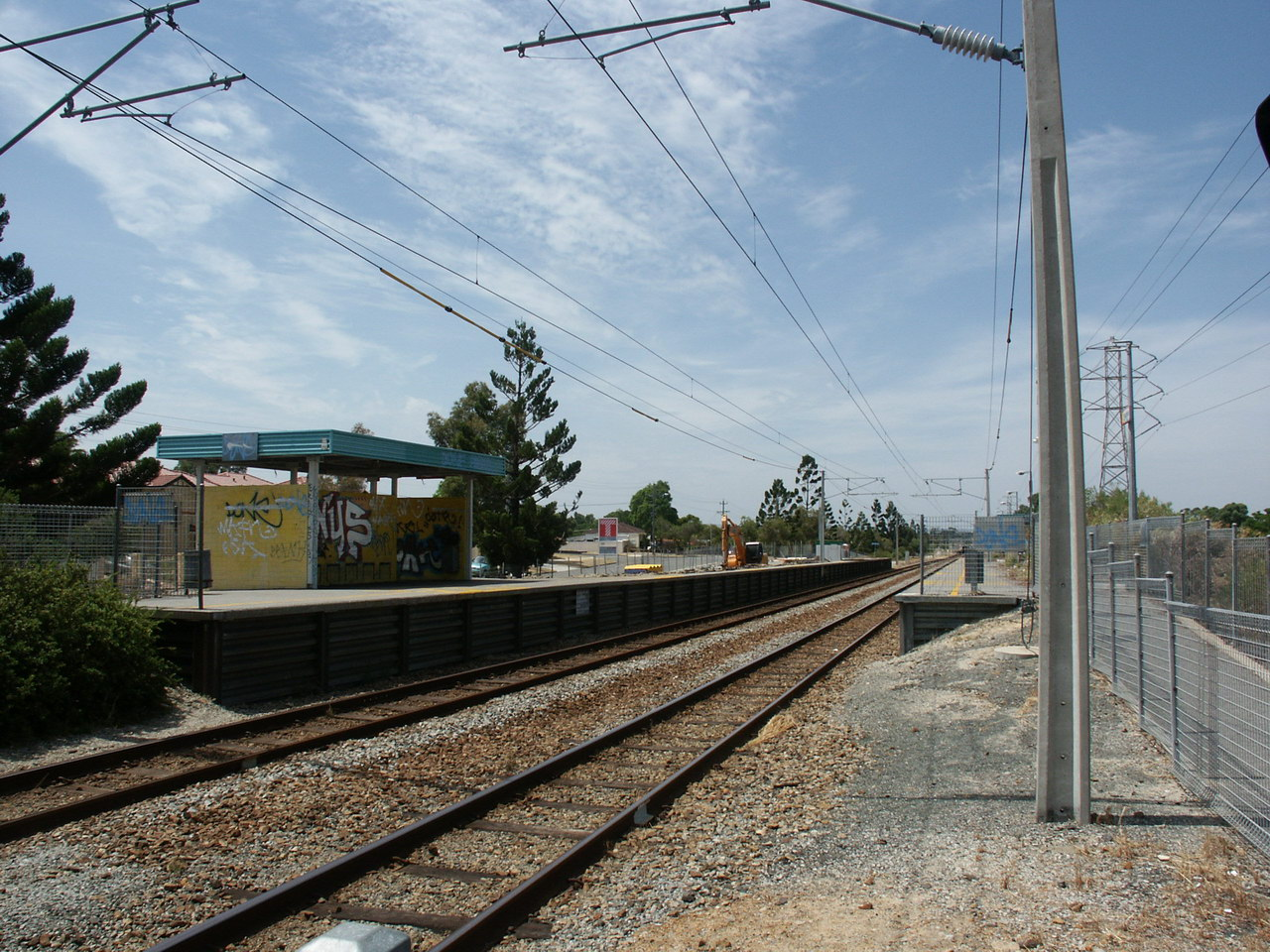
- Lathlain railway station, before it was closed and razed
- Interactive map of Lathlain
- Coordinates: 31.966°S 115.907°E
- Country: Australia
- State: Western Australia
- City: Perth
- LGA: Town of Victoria Park
- Location: 6 km (3.7 mi) from Perth
- Established: 1890s

Government
  - State electorate: Victoria Park
  - Federal division: Swan

Area
  - Total: 1.6 km^{2} (0.62 sq mi)

Population
  - Total: 3,699 (SAL 2021)
- Postcode: 6100
Suburbs around Lathlain
Burswood		Rivervale
Victoria Park	Lathlain	Kewdale
East Victoria Park		Carlisle

Lathlain is an inner south eastern suburb of Perth, Western Australia. Its local government area is the Town of Victoria Park.

== History ==
Lathlain's development commenced in the 1890s when Peet and Co subdivided and sold lots in the "Victoria Park Station Estate" east of the railway station, with quarter-acre blocks on sale for £25–30. A brochure advertising the state claimed the lots were "So near Perth, near the Station and so near the Trams" (although the tram service did not eventuate). Peet and Co's advertising for the Victoria Park Station Estate was elaborate and multifaceted. Much of the promotion centred on the "Oldest Settler", a tree in the shape of a standing figure, located on one of the lots. Would-be purchasers were invited to "Look for the Oldest Settler from the train and at the pictures." They were also assured that the new section of the Victoria Park estate was the "finest subdivision" in Western Australia, destined to be "up-to-date in 40 years time", and distinguished by "Childrens Playgrounds for every group of homes". Residential development was slow, and Geoff Gallop records in his historical notes that "bush land with some heavy timber and the occasional stray cow from Belmont greeted the post-war generation who built the suburb."

Lathlain was a "garden suburb" estate designed in 1920 by Carl Klem and brother-in-law and senior partner Percy Hope. There was much controversy surrounding the development, which was initially planned to have 16 internal reserves that provided open space to all allotments. Maintenance of these public open spaces was seen as problematic by the City of Perth (then the local government of the area), and the plan was scaled back to only two such reserves (bordered by Roberts Road, Rutland Avenue, Bishopsgate Street and Goddard Street) one of which has been sold to adjoining residents (Roberts, Rutland, Bishopsgate, Forster).

The suburb's name honours Sir William Lathlain, the Lord Mayor of Perth from 1918 until 1923. The name was in general use since the 1950s, after a park of this name was built there, but was not gazetted until 1981.

In November 1953, it was proposed that the Perth Football Club, an Australian rules football team in the West Australian Football League, be based at a new oval to be built on vacant land at Lathlain. The Perth City Council supported the scheme, and construction commenced. As residents started to move into the area, a primary school was constructed in 1956. On 11 July 1959, the club moved into the premises at the ground, known as Lathlain Park, and went on to win premierships in 1966-1968 and 1976-1977. The ground was renamed to Eftel Oval in 2003.

Demographics changed and during the early 1990s Lathlain's only civil structure, its local primary school, was earmarked for closure by the education minister at the time, Norman Moore, due to low student enrolments. Students, parents and locals fought successfully to keep the school open, and it now has a healthy enrolment aided by the on-site pre-primary and better facilities.

== Geography ==
Lathlain is bounded by Great Eastern Highway to the northwest, the Armadale railway to the southwest, Roberts Road to the southeast and Orrong Road and Graham Farmer Freeway to the northeast. The suburb is almost entirely residential, although a number of parks can be found – most notably Lathlain Park, which houses the home ground of the Phoenix Demons, and J. A. Lee Reserve. Rayment Park is a small community park located centrally within the suburb, adjacent to Lathlain Primary School, local shops situated in Lathlain Place, Carlisle/Lathlain Playgroup, Carlisle/Victoria Park Toy Library and scout hall.

Lathlain is zoned predominately R20. City and hill views can be found in the western end of the suburb, which is situated on a hill that extends as far north as Rivervale and as far south as Kensington.

== Facilities ==
Lathlain is a residential suburb containing two reserves, two hotels and Lathlain Primary School. Commercial and other services are provided by Victoria Park and Belmont.

== Transport ==
Lathlain is served by the Victoria Park train station on its southwestern edge, and by various bus services. All services are operated by Swan Transit.

The Lathlain railway station, built in 1959 and once located at the beginning of Goddard Street, was closed on 3 February 2003. Almost no trace of it exists today, although when the Lathlain railway station was decommissioned the "Lathlain" lighted signs were donated to the Perth Football Club to display in their clubroom due to their historical links with the station.

=== Bus ===
- 39 Elizabeth Quay Bus Station to Redcliffe Station – serves Great Eastern Highway, Cornwall Street, Gallipoli Street, Streatley Road, Goddard Street and Howick Street
- 51 Perth Busport to Cannington Station – serves Orrong Road

Bus routes serving Great Eastern Highway:

- 270 Elizabeth Quay Bus Station to High Wycombe Station
- 935 Kings Park to Redcliffe Station (high frequency)
- 940 Elizabeth Quay Bus Station to Redcliffe Station (high frequency)

=== Rail ===
- Armadale/Thornlie–Cockburn lines
  - Victoria Park railway station

== Politics ==
Lathlain's booth supports the Australian Labor Party at both federal and state elections, although less strongly than booths to the south and east – in the 1996 election it voted for the Liberal Party.
