= Victoria Park railway station, Perth =

Railway station in Perth, Western Australia

Victoria Park
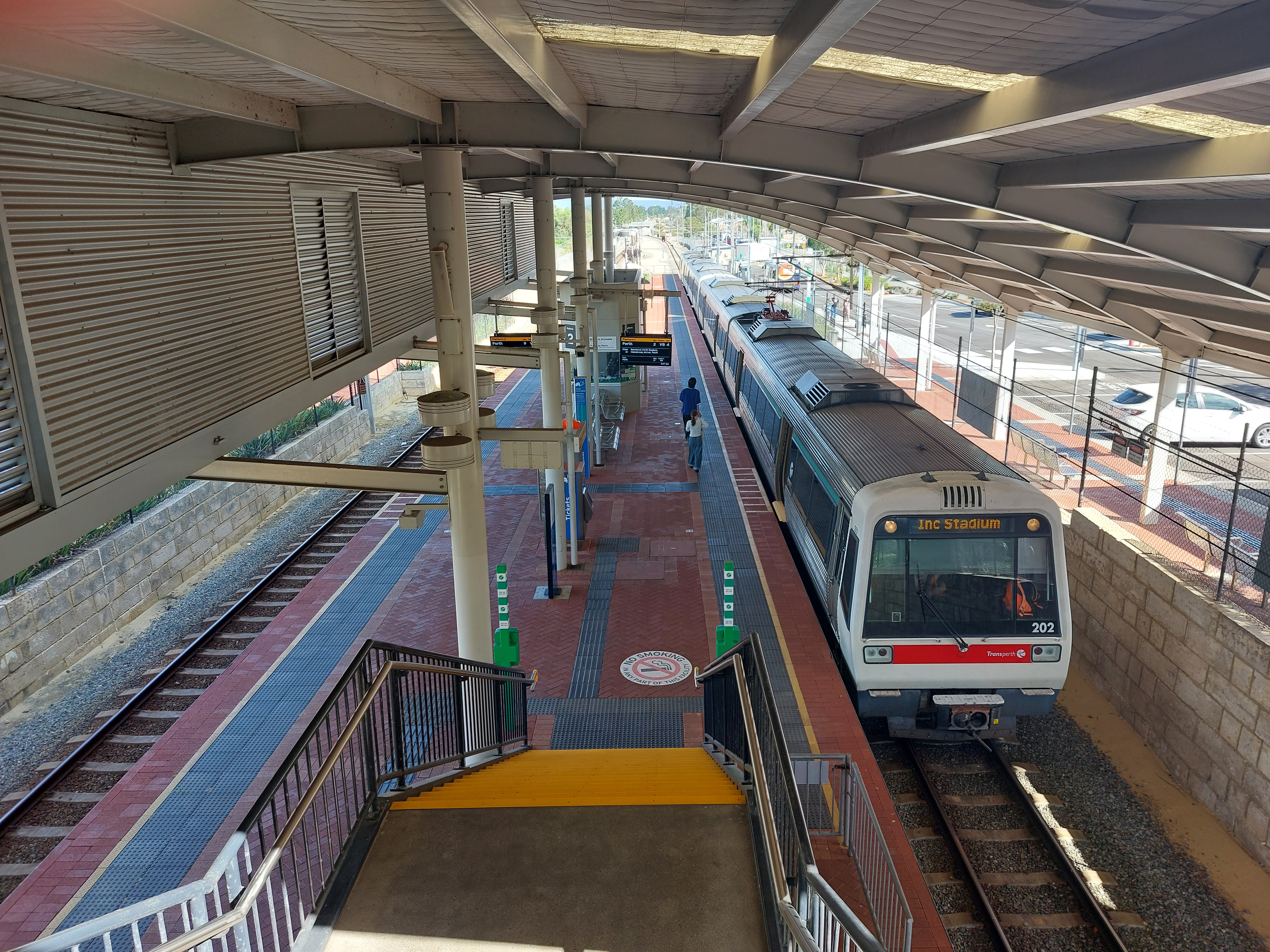
- Southbound view of the station platforms, with a Transperth A-series train at Platform 2, December 2023

General information
- Location: Kitchener Avenue & Rutland Avenue; Lathlain / Victoria Park; Western Australia; Australia
- Coordinates: 31°58′19″S 115°54′09″E
- Owner: Public Transport Authority
- Operator: Public Transport Authority
- Line: South Western Railway
- Distance: 6.1 kilometres (3.8 mi) from Perth
- Platforms: 1 island platform with 2 platform edges
- Tracks: 2

Construction
- Parking: 41 bays
- Accessible: Yes

Other information
- Fare zone: 1

History
- Opened: 1898
- Rebuilt: 2 August 2008

Passengers
- 2013–14: 258,580

Services
Preceding station	Transperth	Following station
Burswood towards Perth	Armadale line	Carlisle towards Byford
Burswood towards Perth	Thornlie–Cockburn line	Carlisle towards Cockburn Central
Location
- Location of Victoria Park station

Victoria Park railway station is a suburban railway station on the Transperth network in Western Australia. The station is in the Perth suburbs of Lathlain and Victoria Park. Between November 2023 and June 2025, the station was the terminus of the Armadale and Thornlie lines due to the Victoria Park-Canning Level Crossing Removal Project.

The first Victoria Park station opened in 1898 after lobbying by the Municipality of Victoria Park. It gained a station master in 1922, which lasted until 1969. The Victoria Park section of the Armadale line underwent several improvements in the 2000s. Lathlain station closed in 2003, and a nearby level crossing was removed and replaced with a bridge. The Thornlie line commenced services on 7 August 2005, enabling most Armadale services to skip the station. In 2007, construction started on a new Victoria Park station, 230 metres (750 ft) south of the original station and closer to the demolished Lathlain station. The new station had greater accessibility and was no longer on a curve, which allowed for a smaller platform gap. The new Victoria Park station opened on 2 August 2008, and the old one was demolished soon afterwards.

== History ==
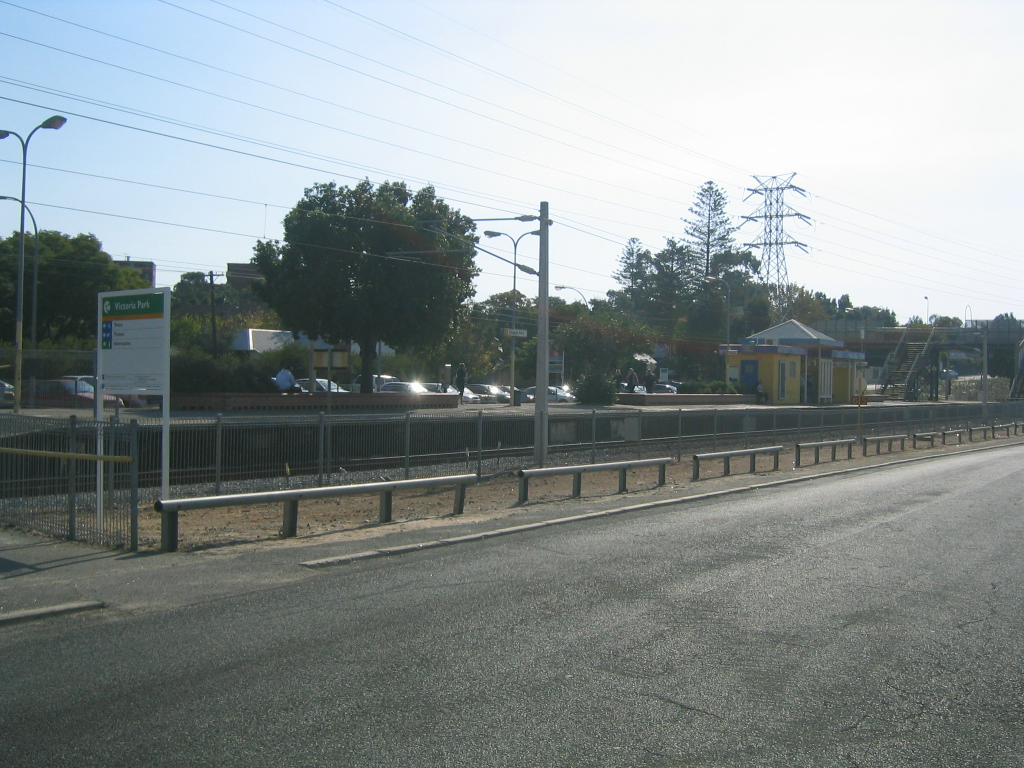
The now demolished Victoria Park station in April 2005

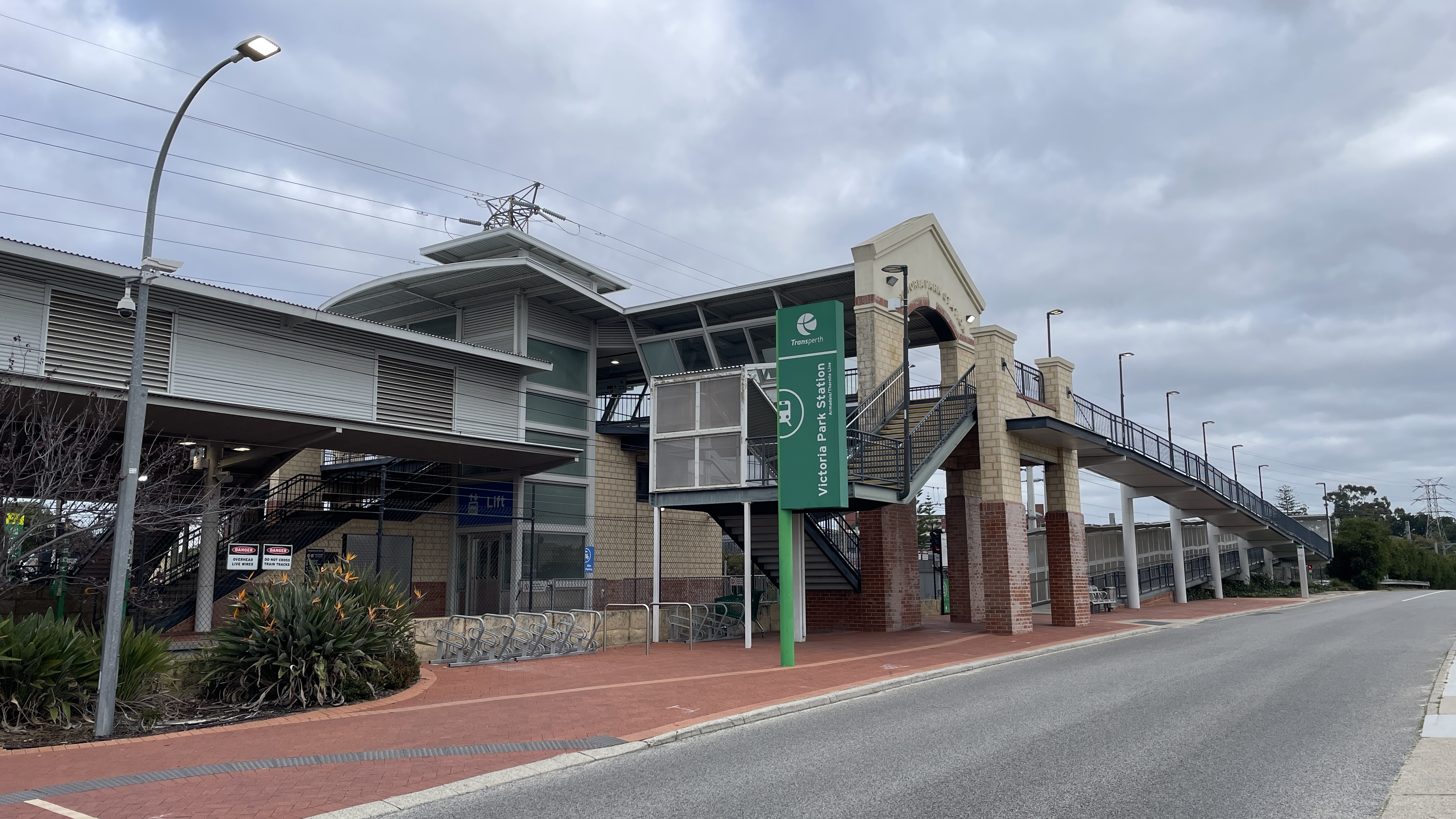
Entrance

The South Western Railway was opened between Perth and Pinjarra on 2 May 1893. By 1897, the closest station to Victoria Park was Burswood station, so the Municipality of Victoria Park sent a deputation to the commissioner of railways, Frederick Piesse, for the establishment of a railway platform at Victoria Park. The original Victoria Park railway station opened in 1898. According to the Town of Victoria Park Local History Collection, the first mention of Victoria Park station on timetables was on 11 April 1898. A footbridge was approved for the station in 1912, and it gained a station master on 1 September 1922. It became an unstaffed station again on 1 March 1969. Over the course of its history, Victoria Park station had four station masters, who were commemorated by a plaque at the station in 1997.

Westrail, the operator of railways in Perth at the time, planned to rebuild Victoria Park station in the late 1990s, but this was deferred pending the completion of planning for the Mandurah line. The original plans for the Mandurah line had it branch off the Armadale line at Kenwick. The first South West Metropolitan Railway Master Plan, published in 1999, found that there were too many stations spaced closely together on the Armadale line between Perth and Kenwick. Victoria Park station was 1,130 metres (3,710 ft) south of Burswood station and 775 metres (2,543 ft) north of Lathlain station. The master plan said that for Mandurah line services to integrate with Armadale line services, there had to be fewer stations along the shared section of track and a change in the stopping patterns of Armadale line services.

The master plan therefore called for the removal of the nearby Bishopsgate Street level crossing, the removal of Lathlain station, the construction of a bridge across the railway at Miller Street/Roberts Road, and the rebuild of Victoria Park station about 230 metres (750 ft) south of the original Victoria Park station. The relocation of Victoria Park station had several advantages: it would put the station closer to the Victoria Park retail area along Albany Highway; fill the gap left by the closure of Lathlain station; make the station distribution along the Armadale line more even; allow for a straight platform with a smaller platform gap than the old station, which was on a curve; and allow for minimal disruption to the old station while the new station was being constructed.

In 2001, a new state government was elected, who changed the route of the Mandurah line to be a more direct route from Perth rather than a branch of the Armadale line. Instead, the Thornlie line would be built as a one-station spur off the Armadale line at the same place as the previous Mandurah line route. A new master plan was released in August 2002. Although other planned upgrades to the Armadale line were cancelled, the Victoria Park station rebuild, Lathlain station closure, level crossing removal, and bridge construction were all planned to go ahead. Construction on the new station was planned to begin in October 2003 and be complete by July 2004.

New MetroRail was formed in 2003 to manage extensions and upgrades to Perth's rail network, including the Victoria Park station rebuild. By this point, the new station was planned to open in late 2004. Lathlain station was closed on 2 February 2003. In September 2003, a contract worth A$7.2 million was awarded to Works Infrastructure Pty Ltd for the deviation of tracks to make room for the island platform at Victoria Park station, the construction of the Miller Street/Roberts Road bridge, and the construction of a pedestrian bridge at Howick Street. Two three-day shutdowns of the Armadale line occurred for the track realignment in January and March 2004. The Miller Street/Roberts Road bridge opened on 26 June 2004, after which the Bishopsgate Street level crossing closed. By that point, tenders for the construction of Victoria Park station had been delayed until the completion of the Mandurah line due to staff shortages in the construction industry. The Thornlie line opened on 7 August 2005.

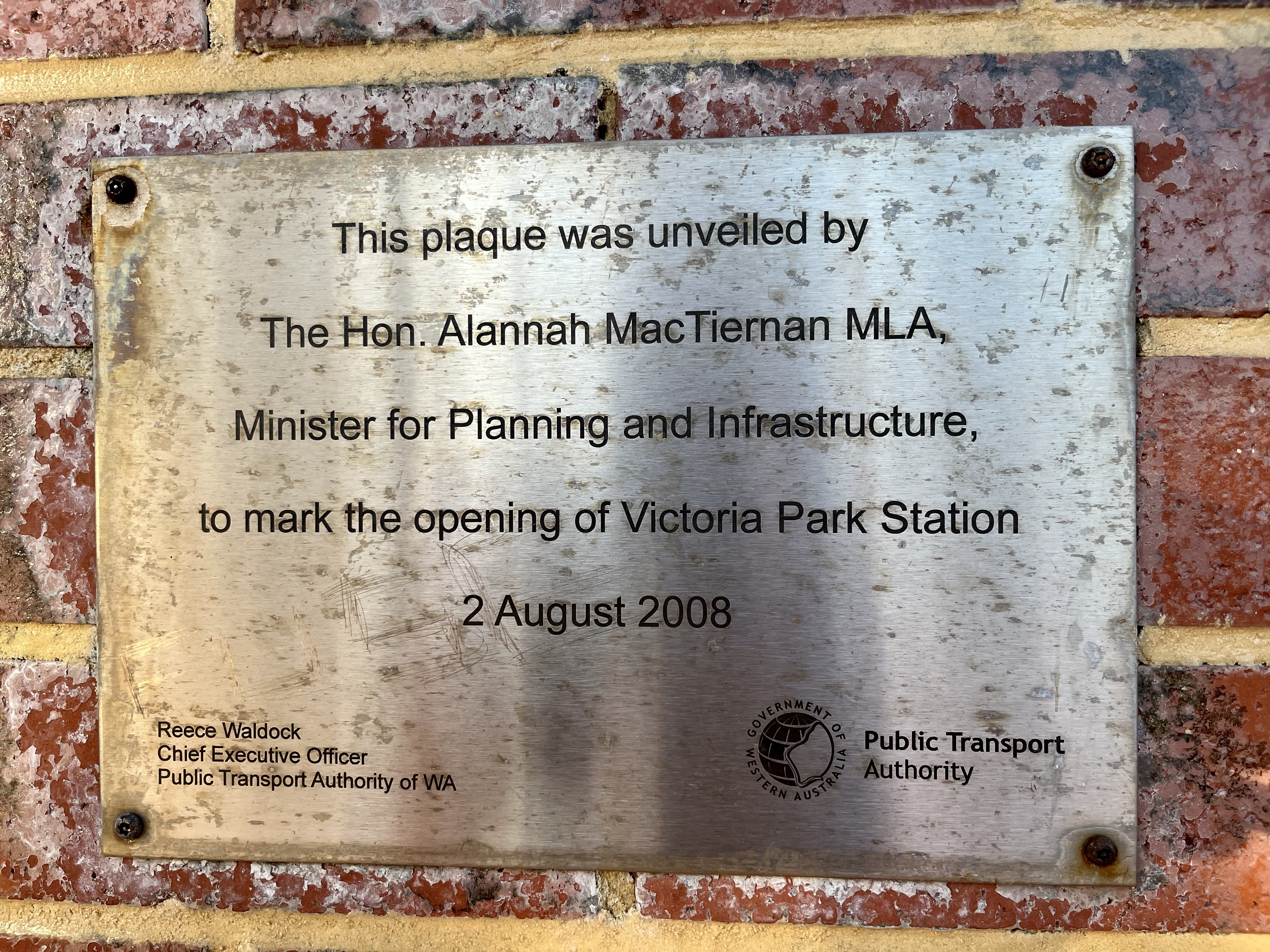
Plaque commemorating the opening of Victoria Park station on 2 August 2008

Broad Construction Services was awarded the $9.2 million contract to build the new Victoria Park station. Construction began in August 2007, and the station was officially opened on 2 August 2008 by Minister for Planning and Infrastructure Alannah MacTiernan. The old station was demolished soon after. The entire cost, including the realignment of the tracks, signalling, and demolition of the old station, was $12.1 million.

As part of construction for Perth Stadium station, stowage tracks for 24 railcars were built between Great Eastern Highway and Victoria Park station, which are used to provide extra services during events at Perth Stadium.

On 20 November 2023, the Armadale and Thornlie lines were shut down for the Victoria Park-Canning Level Crossing Removal Project. The first three days of the shutdown involved a full line closure in order to modify the infrastructure at Victoria Park station to allow for trains to be turned around. Following this, a new shuttle service commenced between Perth and Victoria Park, stopping all stations (except Perth Stadium outside of weekends and events) at 7.5 minute all day frequencies, reducing to every 15 minutes at night with additional late night trains on Friday and Saturday evenings. A temporary bus interchange was built for rail replacement bus services for passengers continuing their journey along the closed section of the line. Perth Stadium was added to the weekday timetable on April 2nd 2024, an addition that has continued since the line fully reopened. The shutdown ended on June 8th 2025 with the opening of the new Thornlie-Cockburn line and resumption of Armadale line services as far as Cannington.

== Description ==
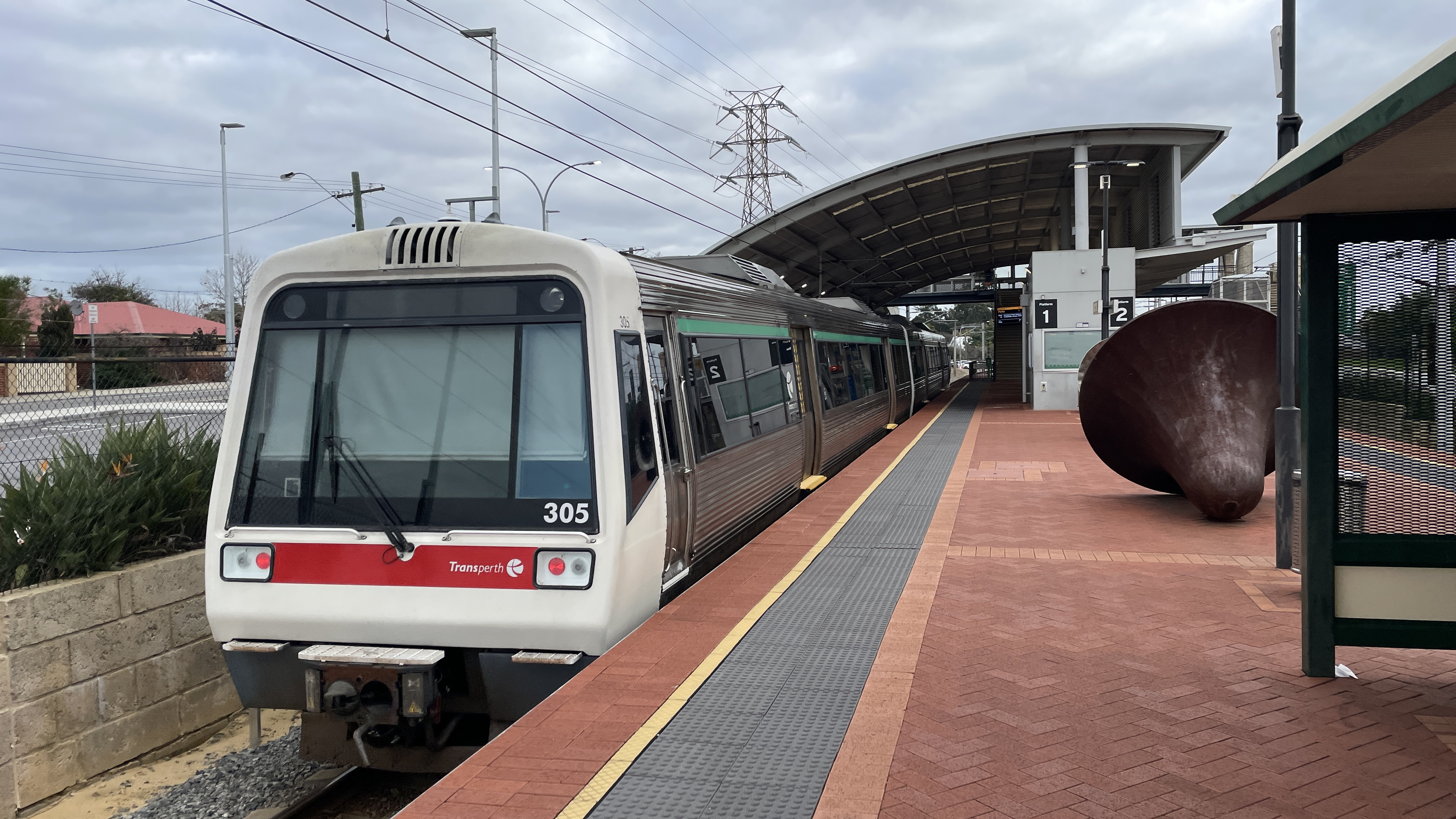
Transperth A-series train on Platform 1

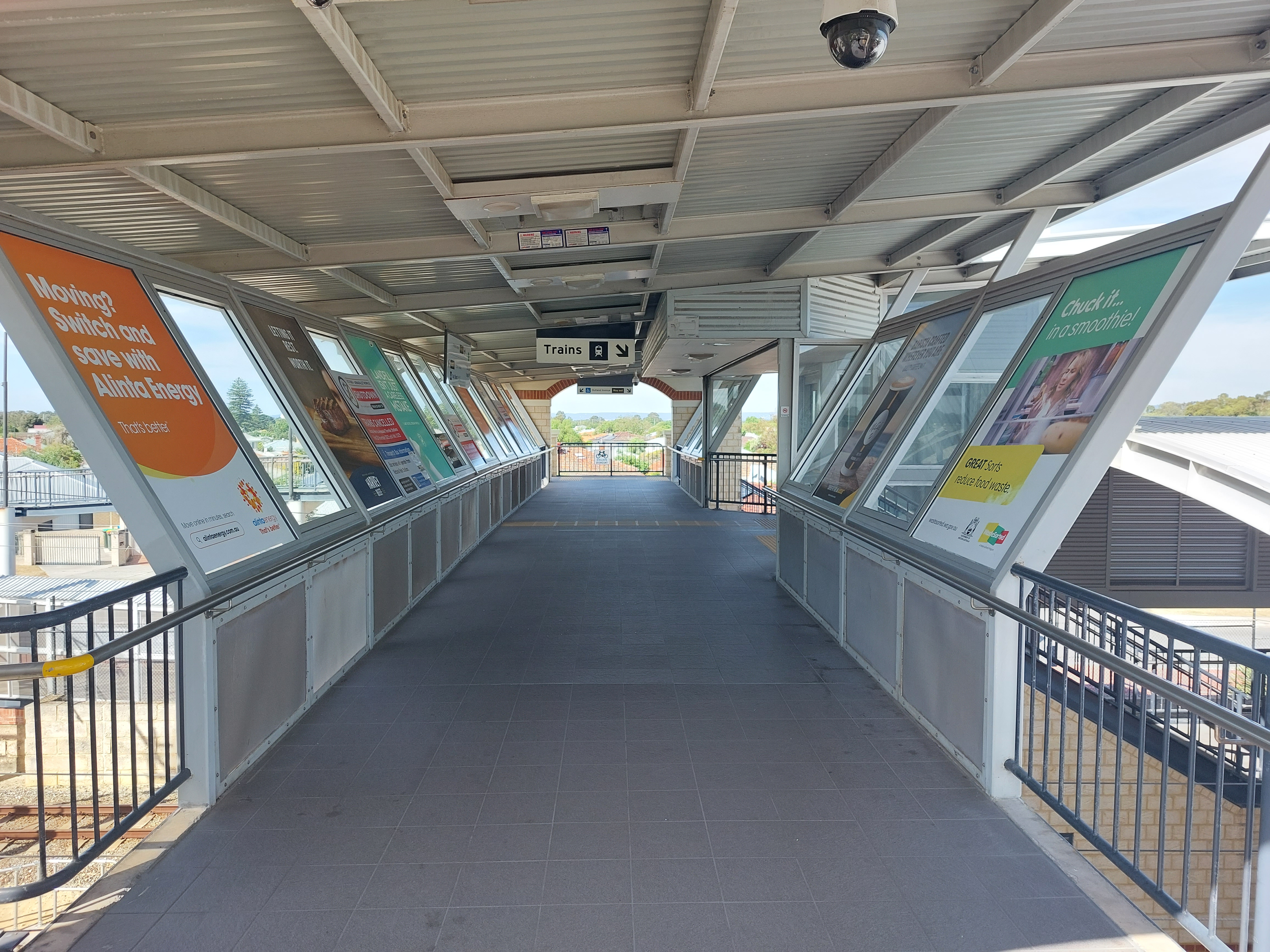
Victoria Park station footbridge

Victoria Park station is on the boundary of Victoria Park and Lathlain, which are suburbs of Perth. The station is on the South Western Railway, which links Perth and Bunbury, and is owned by the Public Transport Authority. The adjacent stations are Burswood station to the north and Carlisle station to the south-east. The station is 6.1 kilometres (3.8 mi) from Perth station and is in fare zone one.

The station itself consists of an island platform which is linked to either side of the railway by a pedestrian bridge. The platform is 100 metres (330 ft) long, which allows for four-car trains, and was designed to allow for extension to 150 metres (490 ft) for six-car trains. Victoria Park station has been identified as one of the stations to have its platform extended as part of phase two of the platform and signalling upgrade program, to allow for six-car trains on the Thornlie-Cockburn line. The platform links to the bridge by a lift and set of stairs. On both sides of the railway is a ramp and set of stairs to the bridge. There is a car park with 41 bays on the south-western side. Train replacement bus stops are on the north-eastern side.

Victoria Park station is fully accessible, and was designed with consultation from the nearby Association for the Blind, now known as VisAbility. The station's design was criticised by Victoria Park councillor Keith Hayes for a lack of shelter along the ramps, a lack of lifts on either side of the footbridge, and the lack of a ramp from the bridge to the platform, which is a problem when the lift is out of order. The length of the ramps was also criticised. Initial designs had lifts on both sides, but that was cut due to budget constraints.

The pre-2008 Victoria Park station had a curved island platform with a pedestrian level crossing on the south-east end and a footbridge accessed by stairs on the north-west end.

=== Art ===
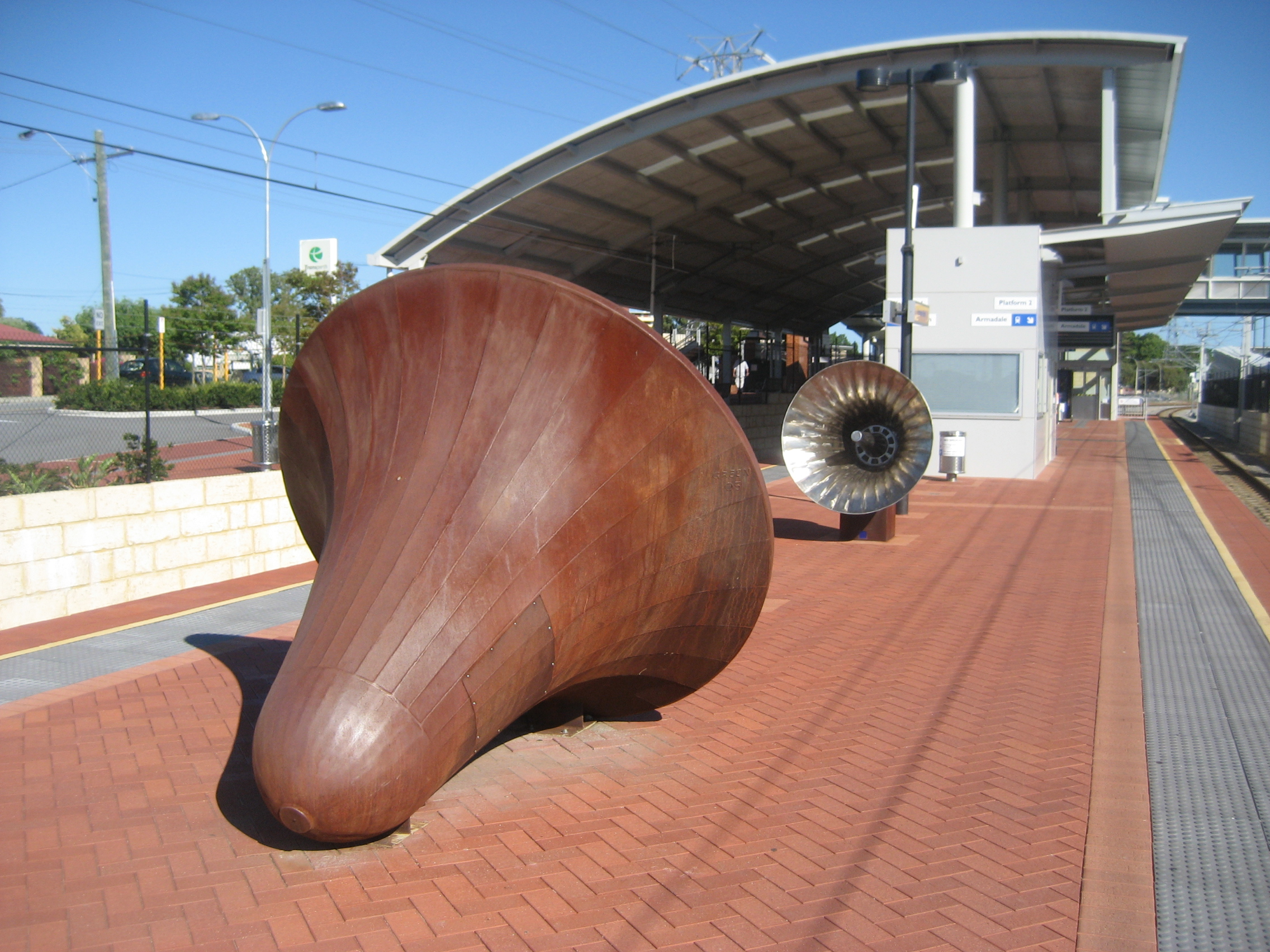
Mute and Bright

On the platform is an art installation named Mute and Bright. This consists of two large steel bells. The bells play sounds created by visually-impaired artist Rob Muir. The artist's statement was "the artworks offer a visual solidity while producing timed and interactive sampling and replaying of altered sounds. They create an ever-changing soundscape that can be both heard and felt."

== Services ==
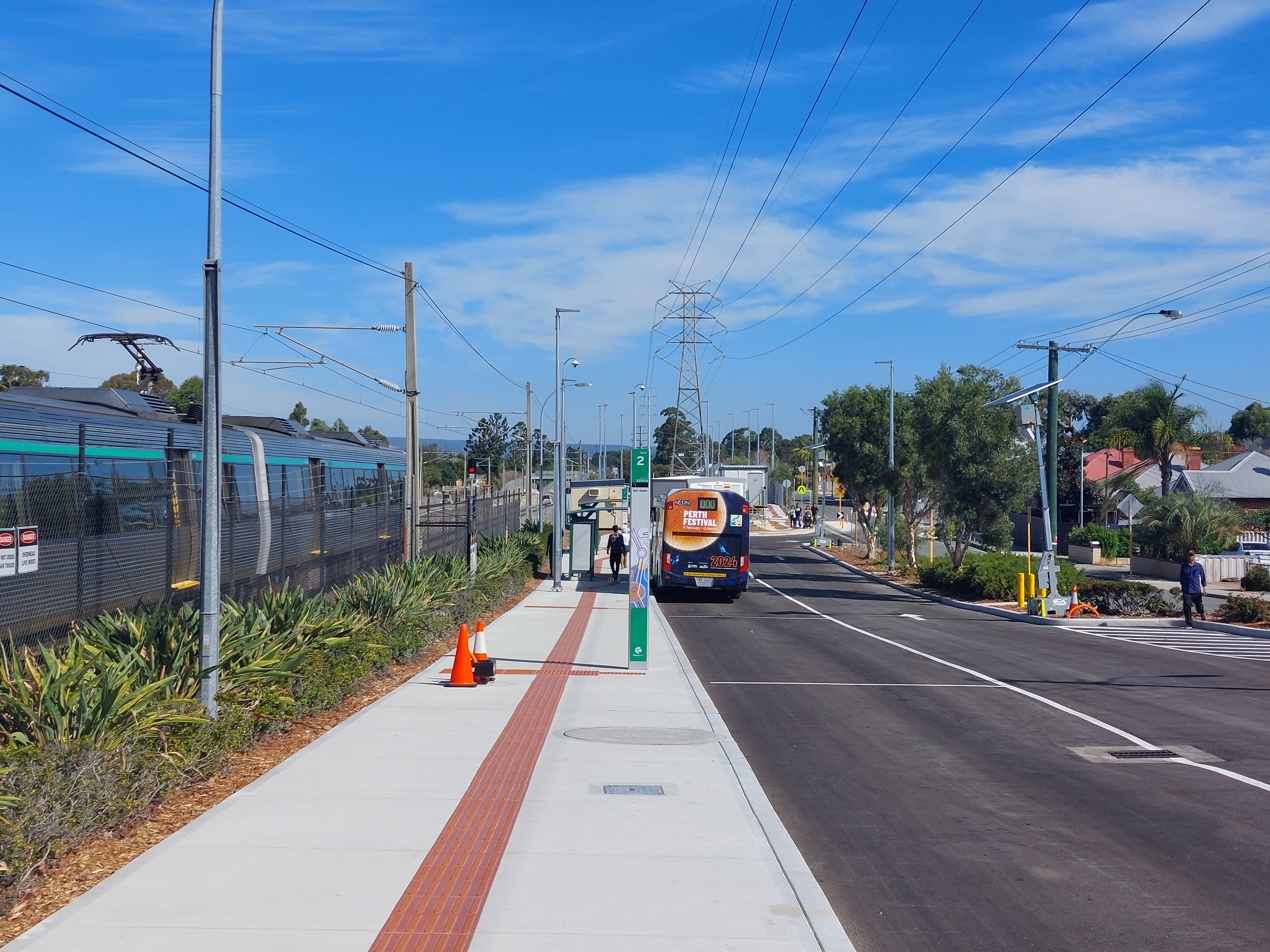
Temporary bus interchange at Victoria Park station

Victoria Park station is served by Armadale and Thornlie–Cockburn line services. These services form part of the Transperth system and are operated by the Public Transport Authority. Victoria Park station was skipped by some Armadale services before the shutdown, but now sees all trains stop. The Armadale line currently runs between Perth and Cannington every 7.5 minutes during the day and every 15 minutes at night. The Thornlie-Cockburn line operates between Perth and Cockburn Central (via Thornlie) and runs every 15 minutes during the day and every 30 minutes at night. Service hours are from approximately 5 am and midnight, extending to 2:40 am on Saturday and Sunday mornings.

Train replacement bus services operate out of stops on Bishopsgate Street, to the north of the station. Route 908 goes between Perth Busport and Cockburn Central station along the Thornlie-Cockburn line route.

In the 2013–14 financial year, Victoria Park station had 258,580 boardings, making it an average station for the Armadale and Thornlie lines.

Victoria Park platform arrangement
Stop ID	Platform	Line	Destination	Via	Stopping Pattern	Notes
99051	1	Armadale line	Perth		All stations	
99051	1	Thornlie-Cockburn line	Perth		All stations	
99052	2	Armadale line	Byford		All stations	
99052	2	Thornlie-Cockburn line	Cockburn Central		All stations	

== See also ==
- Causeway bus station, formerly known as Victoria Park transfer station
